= Gamba =

Gamba or Gambas may refer to:

== Geography ==
- Gamba, Gabon, a port
  - Gamba Airport in Gamba, Gabon
- Gamba, Chad, a town
- Gamba County, Tibet

== People ==
- Gamba (surname)
- Gamba (footballer) (Carlos Alberto Gambarotta; 1893–1944), Brazilian footballer

== Other uses ==
- Viol, any of a family of stringed musical instruments, informally called a gamba
- Gamba di Pernice or Gamba rossa, a variety of grape
- Gamba Osaka, Japanese football team
- Gambas (Spanish "prawns") programming language
- Gamba, title character of the Japanese novel Boukenshatachi: Gamba to 15-hiki no Nakama by Atsuo Saitō, as well as its anime adaptation Gamba no Bouken and film adaptation Gamba: Gamba to Nakama-tachi.
- "Gamba", a song by Brockhampton from Saturation II
- Gamba grass (Andropogon gayanus)
- Gamba, the Hebrew word for a red Bell pepper
