= Janusz Turowski =

Janusz Turowski may refer to:

- Janusz Turowski (footballer) (born 1961), Polish football coach and player
- Janusz Turowski (professor) (1927–2020), Polish engineer
