= University of Pavia =

Public university in Pavia, Italy

- Università di Pavia
- Coat of Arms of the University.
- Latin: Alma Ticinensis Universitas
- Motto: Par ingenio virtus
- Type: Public
- Established: 13 April 1361; 665 years ago
- Affiliations: Coimbra Group, EUA, Netval, EC2U
- Rector: Alessandro Reali
- Faculty: 981
- Students: 26,400 (2025)
- Location: Pavia, Lombardy, Italy; 45°11′12″N 9°9′23″E
- Campus: Urban/University town
- Colors: Crimson
- Website: unipv.eu

The University of Pavia (Italian: Università degli Studi di Pavia, UNIPV or Università di Pavia; Latin: Alma Ticinensis Universitas) is a university located in Pavia, Lombardy, Italy. There was evidence of teaching as early as 1361, making it one of the oldest universities in the world. It was the sole university in the greater Lombardy region until the end of the 19th century. Currently, it has 18 departments and 2 faculties. It does not have a main campus; its buildings and facilities are scattered around the city, which is in turn called "a city campus". The university caters to more than 20,000 students who come from Italy and all over the world.

The university offers more than 80 undergraduate programs; over 40 master programs, and roughly 20 doctoral programs (including 8 in English). About 1,500 students who enter the university every year are international students.

The university operates multiple cultural and scientific museums, including the University History Museum, a botanical garden, research centers, university libraries and a university press. The university is also affiliated with Policlinico San Matteo, at which hundreds of medical students from the university perform clinical rotations during their clinical years.

The University of Pavia is a member of the COIMBRA Group , EC2U and European University Association. It also participates in the Erasmus Programme, which allows student exchanges between the University of Pavia and various universities in Europe.

== History ==
=== Foundation and the Middle Ages ===
An edict issued by the Frankish king of Italy, Lothar I (ruled 818–55) mentions the existence of a higher education institution at Pavia as early as AD 825. This institution, mainly devoted to ecclesiastical and civil law as well as to divinity studies, was then selected as the prime educational centre for northern Italy.

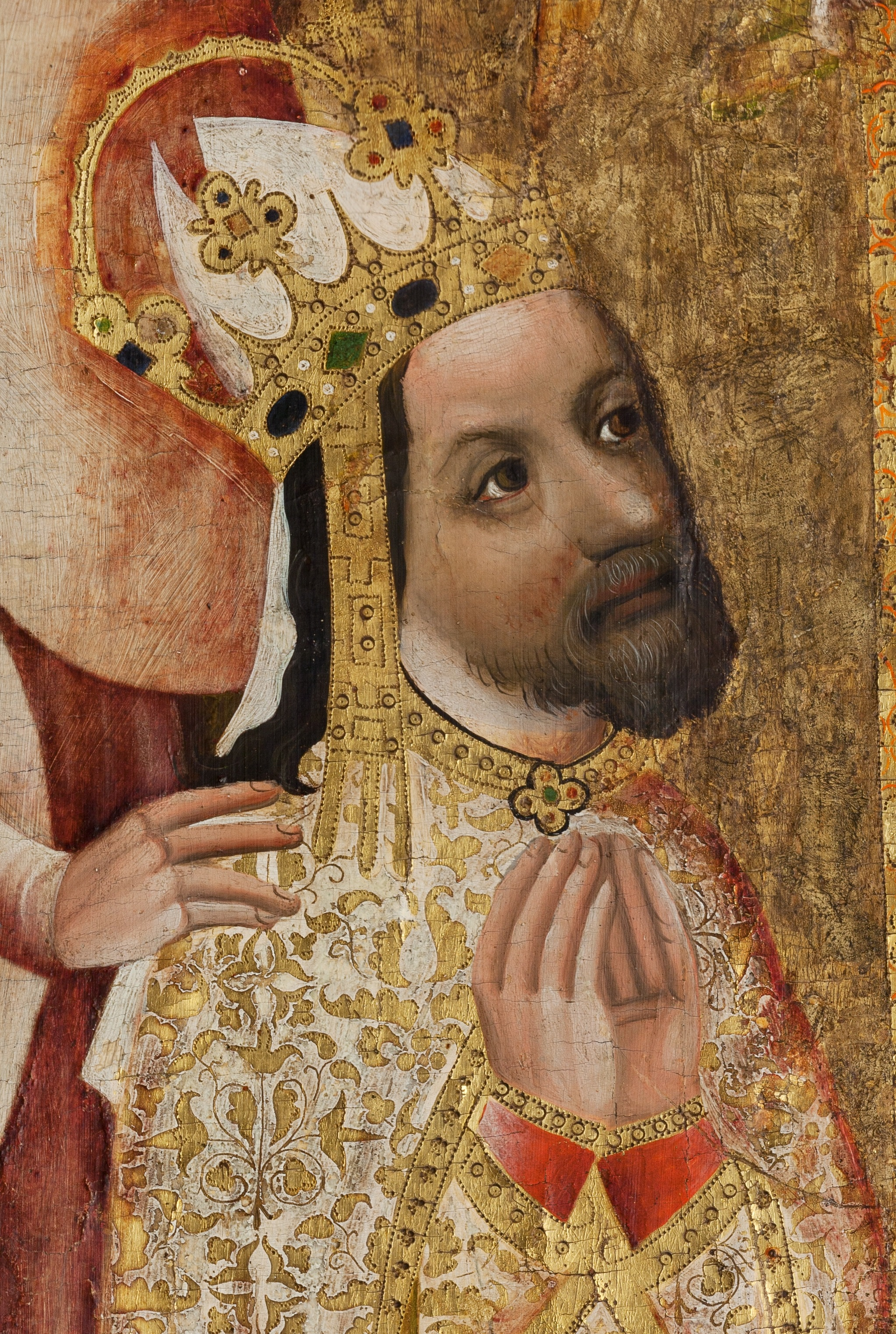
The University was officially established as a Studium Generale in 1361 by Gian Galeazzo Visconti, Lord of Milan and Pavia, who obtained the decree from Holy Roman Emperor Charles IV.

In 1361, the institution was officially established as a studium generale by the Holy Roman emperor Charles IV, who granted the same teaching privileges enjoyed by the University of Paris and Bologna, allowing the institution to teach canon and civil law, philosophy, medicine and liberal arts. It was then expanded and renovated by the duke of Milan, Gian Galeazzo Visconti, becoming the sole university in the Duchy of Milan until the end of the 19th century. Gian Galeazzo worked tirelessly to consolidate the institution and in 1389, he obtained a permission from Pope Boniface IX to teach advanced theology courses. It was divided into two distinct universities — of jurisprudence (teaching civil and canon law courses) and of arts (teaching medicine, philosophy and liberal arts courses). A rector was elected every year, normally a student who was over twenty years old. The institution offered bachelor, licentiate and doctoral degrees. Despite the politics and hardships due to wars and pestilence, it experienced great growth and the institution was considered to be prestigious as evidenced by the influx of foreign students at the time. In 1412, Filippo Maria Visconti further consolidated the universities, invited prominent scholars to teach there and declared an edict giving serious penalties aimed at preventing students from going elsewhere to study.

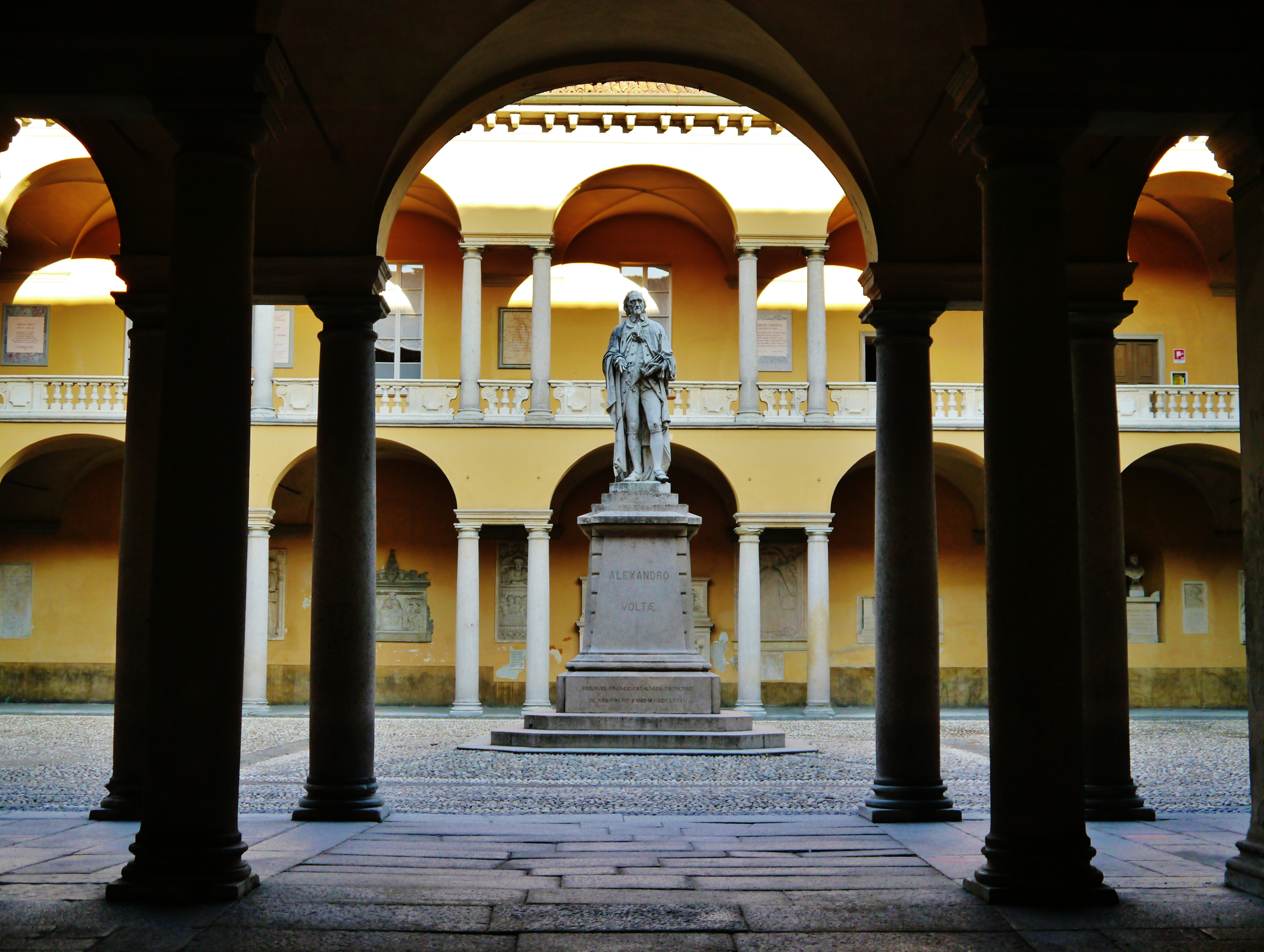
Statue of Alessandro Volta in the courtyard "Cortile Volta" of historic building

=== Renaissance and Modern Period ===
Towards the 15th century, prominent teachers such as Baldo degli Ubaldi, Lorenzo Valla, Giasone del Maino taught students in the fields of law, philosophy and literary studies. In the same years, Elia di Sabato da Fermo, personal doctor of Filippo Maria Visconti, was the first professor of medicine of the Jewish religion at a European university, while from 1490 a teaching of Hebrew was established at the university. Not many years later, probably in 1511, Leonardo da Vinci studied anatomy together with Marcantonio della Torre, professor of anatomy at the university.

During the ongoing Italian War of 1521–6, the authorities in Pavia were forced to close the university in 1524. However, during the 16th century, after the university was re-opened, scholars and scientists such as Andrea Alciato and Gerolamo Cardano taught here. During the period in which the duchy of Milan was governed by the kings of Spain, the research and educational activities of the university stagnated, but there were still prominent scholars such as Gerolamo Saccheri who was still involved with the university.

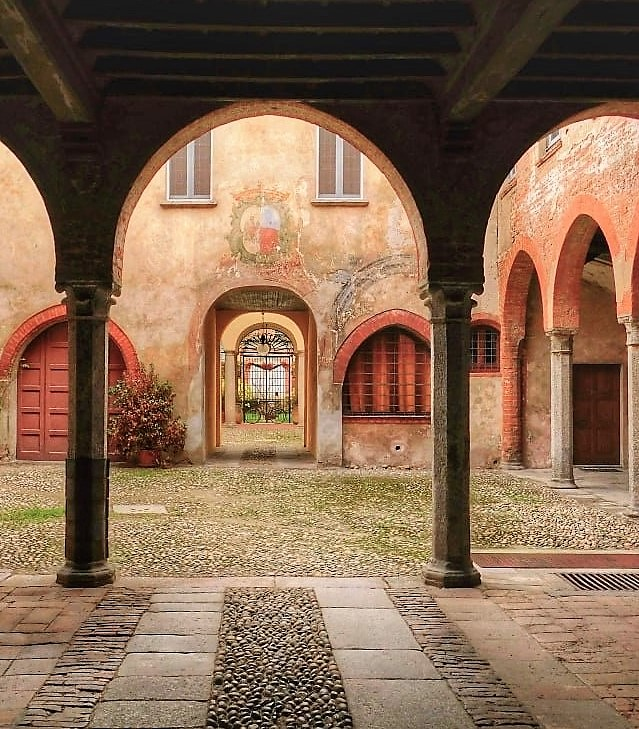
Palazzo Cornazzani, the residence of Ugo Foscolo , later inhabited by young Albert Einstein who stayed there with his family between 1895 and 1896, a period in which his father Hermann ran a factory manufacturing electric machines in Pavia.

The rebirth of the university was, in part, due to the initiatives led by Maria Theresa and Joseph II of the House of Austria, in the second half of the 18th century. The initiatives included massive renovations to the teaching programs, research and structure rehabilitations, which were still retained by the university until now.

Throughout its history, the university had benefited from the presence of many distinguished teachers and scientists who wrote celebrated works and made important discoveries — chemist Luigi Valentino Brugnatelli, mathematician Girolamo Cardano (born in Pavia, 1501–76), physicist Alessandro Volta (chair of natural philosophy 1769–1804), poet Ugo Foscolo (chair of eloquence 1809–10), playwright Vincenzo Monti, jurist Gian Domenico Romagnosi, naturalist Lazzaro Spallanzani (chair of natural history 1768-1799), mathematician Lorenzo Mascheroni and anatomist Antonio Scarpa.

In 1858, the university was the scene of intense student protests against Austrian rule in northern Italy (through the kingdom of Lombardy–Venetia). The authorities responded by ordering the university's temporary closure. The incidents at Pavia were typical of the wave of nationalist demonstrations all over Italy that immediately preceded the Unification (1859–66).

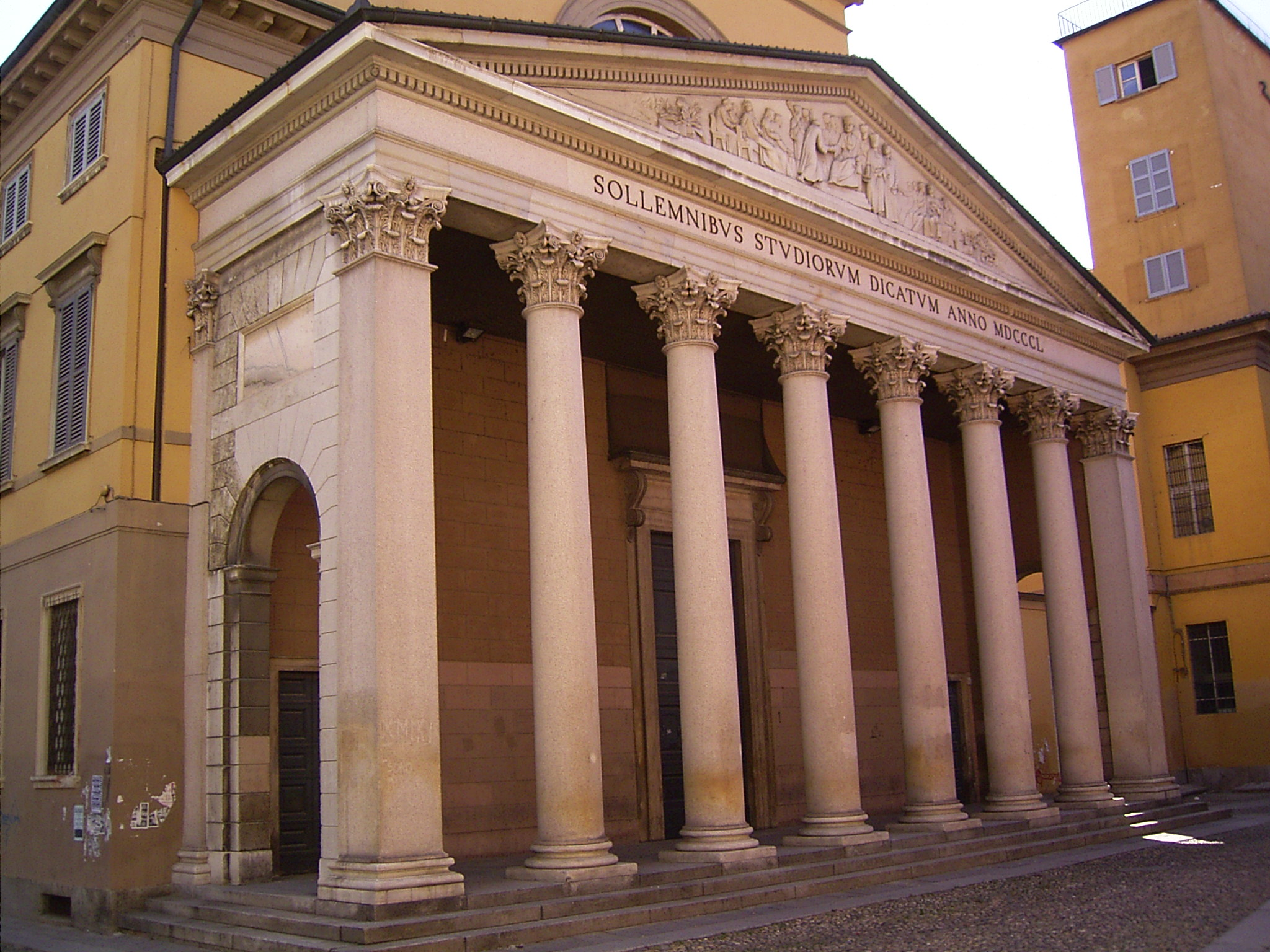
Giuseppe Marchesi, Aula Magna - Brugnatelli taught here from 1796 to 1818.

During the 19th century, the medical, natural science and mathematics schools were graced by prominent scientists who propelled the status of the university to new heights. Three Nobel Prize winners taught in Pavia — physician Camillo Golgi (at Pavia from 1861), who was awarded the Nobel Prize in Physiology in 1906 for his studies on the structure of the nervous system, chemist Giulio Natta (at Pavia between 1933 and 1935) and physicist Carlo Rubbia. In addition, distinguished mathematicians Eugenio Beltrami, Felice Casorati and Luigi Berzolari were regular teachers in Pavia. It was also in the University of Pavia, in 1912, Carlo Forlanini discovered the first successful cure for tuberculosis — artificial pneumothorax. In the 1960s, the Faculty of Economics and Commerce as well as Engineering were added to the current lineup of faculties.

During the 20th century, teaching and research activities were carried out by additional prominent scholars such as Pasquale Del Giudice and Arrigo Solmi for law history; Contardo Ferrini and Pietro Bonfante for Roman law; Luigi Cossa and Benvenuto Griziotti for economy, Giacinto Romano for medieval and modern history and Plinio Fraccaro for ancient history.

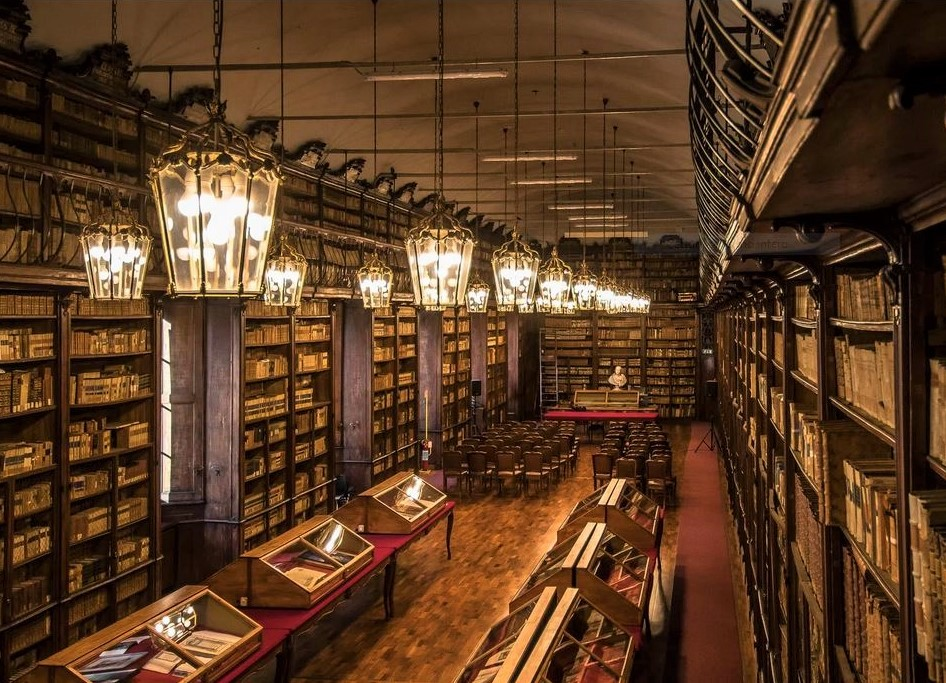
Giuseppe Piermarini, University Library of Pavia, 1772.

Also critical to the university's reputation was its distinguished record of public education, epitomized by the establishment of private and public colleges. The oldest colleges, the Collegio Borromeo and Collegio Ghislieri, were built in the 16th century, and in more recent times others were founded through both public and private initiatives — the Collegio Nuovo, the Collegio Santa Caterina and the other eleven colleges managed by EDiSU. In 1997 the IUSS, was established, a Higher Learning Institution(Italian: Istituto Universitario di Studi Superiori) similar to the Scuola Normale Superiore and Istituto Superiore Sant'Anna in Pisa. The IUSS is the federal body that links the colleges of Pavia which constitute the Pavia University System.

In 1989, Luca Bardi (violinist) and Franco Gerevini (pianist, oboist, and conductor) established the Camerata de' Bardi, the academic orchestra of the University of Pavia in Italy. As of 2016, Nicola Bisson served as the orchestra's conductor.

Today, the university continues to offer a wide variety of disciplinary and inter-disciplinary teaching. Research is carried out in departments, institutes, clinics, centres and laboratories, in close association with public and private institutions, enterprises, and factories.

== Organization ==
The university has eighteen departments and two faculties.

=== Departments ===
- Department of Clinical Surgery, Diagnostics and Pediatrics
- Department of Internal Medicine and Medical Therapy
- Department of Molecular Medicine
- Department of Public Health and Forensic Medicine
- Department of Neuroscience
- Department of Pharmacy
- Department of Biology and Biotechnology "Lazzaro Spallanzani"
- Department of Chemistry
- Department of Mathematics
- Department of Physics
- Department of Earth and Environmental Sciences
- Department of Civil Engineering and Architecture
- Department of Industrial and Information Engineering
- Department of Economics and Management
- Department of Law
- Department of Political and Social Sciences
- Department of Humanities
- Department of Musicology

=== Faculties ===
- Faculty of Engineering
- Faculty of Medicine and Surgery

== Campus ==
The city of Pavia is essentially a city campus, so the campus buildings are located all around the city. The campuses for Faculty of Political Science and Law are located at Old Campus at Via Strada Nuova, near Pavia Cathedral. The campuses for Faculty of Engineering, Pharmacy, Mathematics, Physics and Natural Sciences are located at Via Ferrata, about 3 km away from the city center, in a building complex called Polo Cravino. The campuses for Faculty of Economics, Department of Psychology and Department of Philosophy are located at the Monastery of San Felice. The campus for Department of Musicology is located at Palazzo Raimondi, Cremona. The campuses for Faculty of Pharmacy and Medicine and Surgery are located at Via Taramelli and Via Golgi, near Policlinico San Matteo.

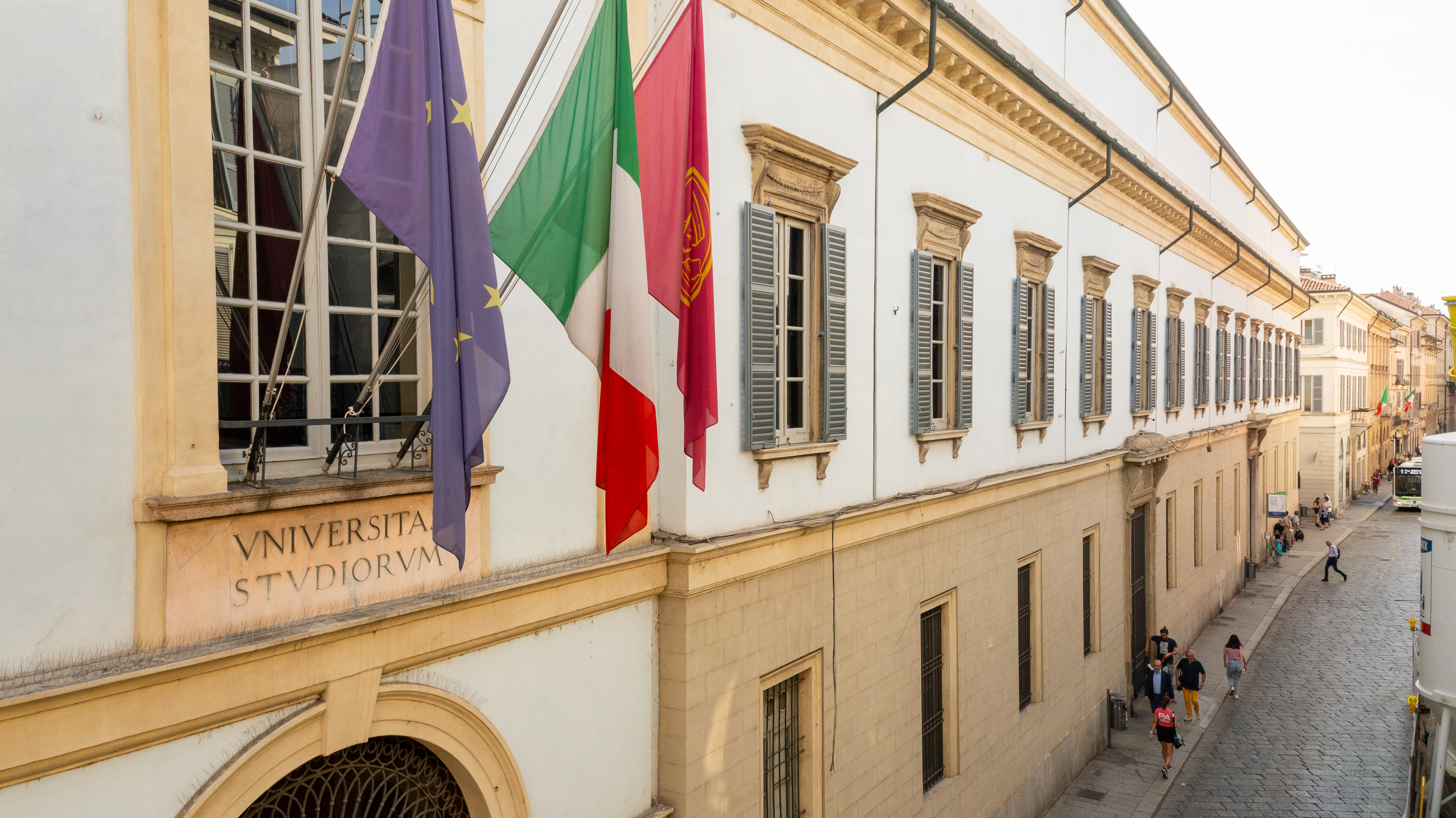
Giuseppe Piermarini, facade of the university, 1771–1773.

=== Palazzo Centrale ===
The entrance to the Old Campus, which hosts the Faculty of Political Science and Law, is located at Via Strada Nuova. The palace has 9 courtyards — Cortile dei Caduti, Cortile di Volta, Cortile delle Statue, Cortile di Atilia Secundina, Cortile del Miliario, Cortile delle Magnolie, Cortile dei Tassi, Cortile Sforzesco, Cortile Teresiano. The palace also hosts more than 40 lecture theatres, including 8 lecture theatres for Faculty of Law and 10 lecture theatres for the Faculty of Political Science. The largest lecture theatre in the university is called Aula Magna, where inauguration ceremonies for graduations, white coat ceremonies and conferment of Medaglio Teresiana are held.

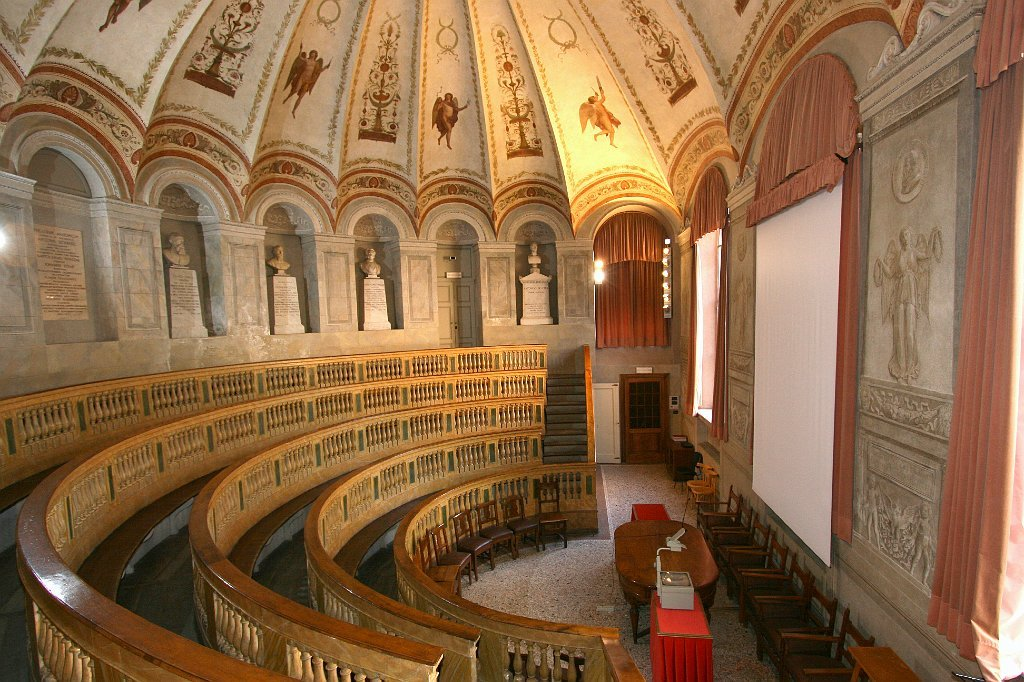
Leopoldo Pollack, Aula Scarpa, 1785–1786.

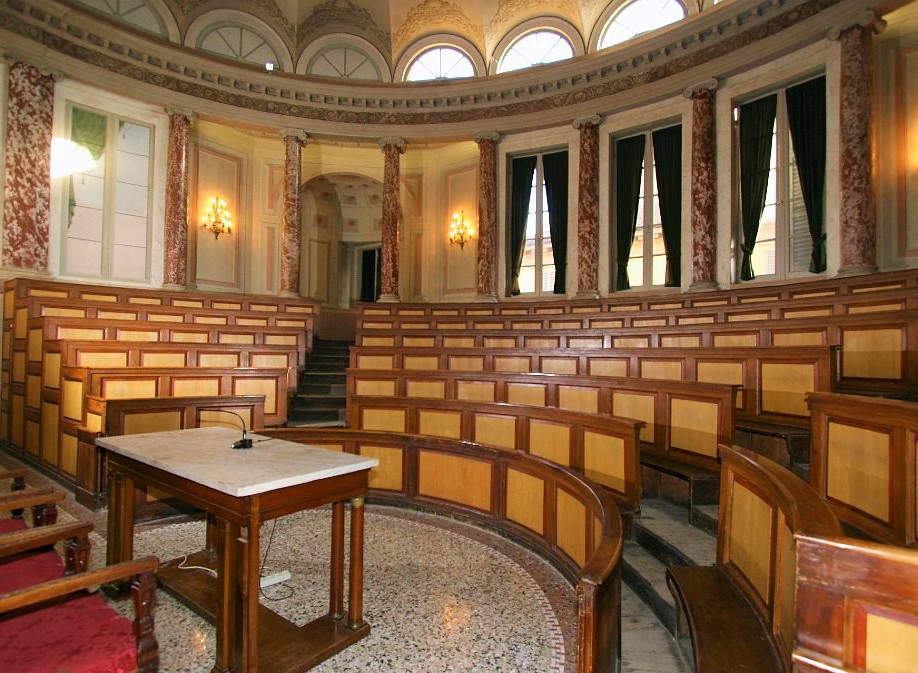
Leopoldo Pollack, Aula Volta, 1787.

The palace dates back all the way to the 15th century. Originally, lessons by the university were held in private houses, in convents which provide suitable premises or in the same place as the municipal building. At the end of the 15th century, Ludovico il Moro assigned a building in Strada Nuova that belonged to Azzone Visconti to the university. Between 1661 and 1671, a major renovation was carried out under the guidance of the architect Ambrogio Pessina. During the 18th century, Maria Theresa of Austria wanted to make some improvements both to the education system and the building, thus she assigned the architect Giuseppe Piermarini and Leopoldo Pollack to oversee the renovations. Giuseppe Piermarini was in charge of the building facade and the courtyards, while Leopoldo Pollack was in charge of the lecture halls.

During the 19th century, the university also incorporated the former monastery of Leano, which was donated by Joseph II of Lorena Habsburg and expanded to Via Mentana, these works were entrusted to the architect Giuseppe Marchesi, who also constructed the Aula Magna.

In 1932, the university acquired a vast 15th century complex which belonged to San Matteo Hospital, thus completing its expansion. This complex now houses the Department of Molecular Medicine, which is in charge of the health courses.

=== Polo Cravino ===
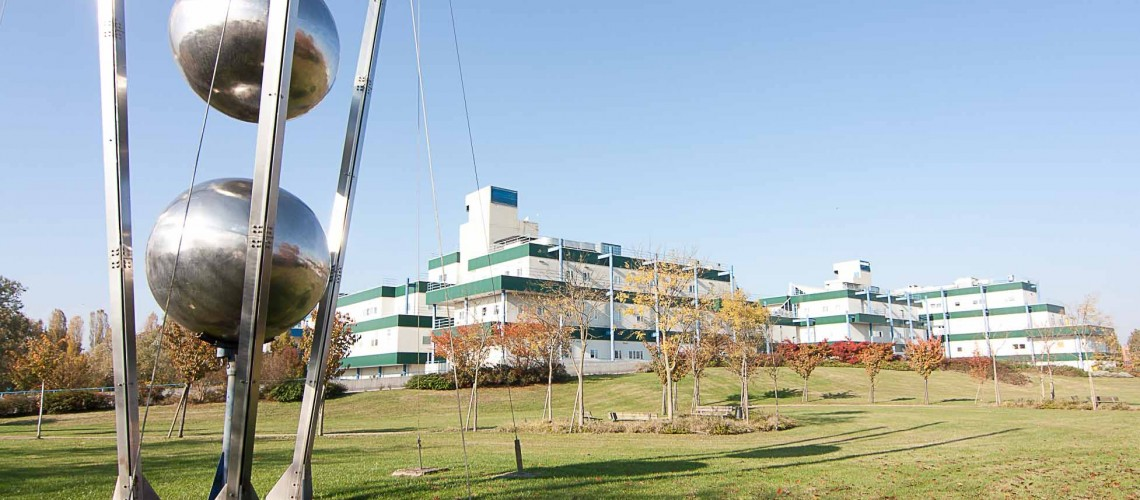
Polo Nave, Faculty of Engineering in Polo Cravino Complex.

The land where Polo Cravino was built was purchased by the university at end of 1960. The complex was designed by an architect Giancarlo De Carlo. In 1980, the buildings for Faculty of Engineering, Department of Genetics, lecture halls, laboratories as well as a complex for Institute of Molecular Genetics, under the National Research Council were completed. In 1990, buildings for Department of Mathematics, Department of Earth and Environmental Science and a Computer Center were added.

=== Health Campus "Campus Della Salute" ===
The Health Campus (Italian: Campus della Salute), inaugurated in September 2023, is a 13,000-square-meter facility that serves as the primary hub for the University of Pavia's Faculty of Medicine and Surgery. Located in the former Clinical Medicine pavilion of the San Matteo Hospital, the campus centralizes 22 degree programs and accommodates approximately 2,100 students.

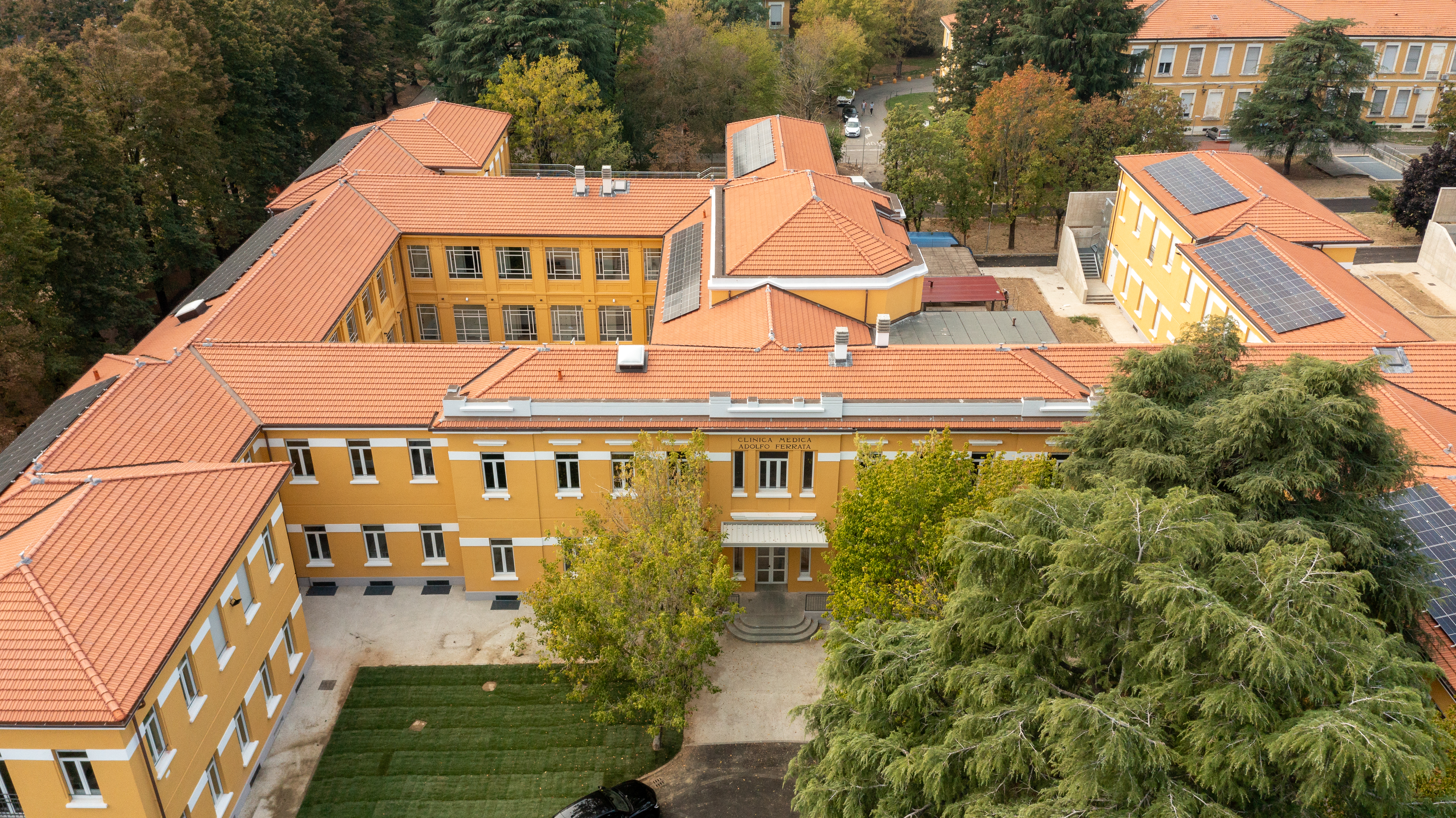
Campus Della Salute, inaugurated in September 2023.

The campus infrastructure includes 16 multimedia classrooms, 12 study rooms, and a health sciences library housing 200,000 volumes. A signature feature is the advanced Clinical Simulation Center, which utilizes 3D-printed organs, anatomical manikins, and virtual simulators to provide innovative practical training for future medical professionals. Clinical electives for medical students are held in nearby IRCCS San Matteo, Fondazione San Maugeri, Neurological Institute C. Mondino and other local hospitals in the Regional Hospitals Agency like Istituto di Cura Città di Pavia

University of Pavia's Medicine and Surgery course is ranked 269th globally and 10th in Italy in QS Ranking 2026. While 2026 ranking published by Research.com ranks it 187th in the world with total of 11,934 publications and 1950 D-index. The Faculty of Medicine and Surgery in Pavia is the 2nd best in Italy, as per Censis Ranking 2026/27.

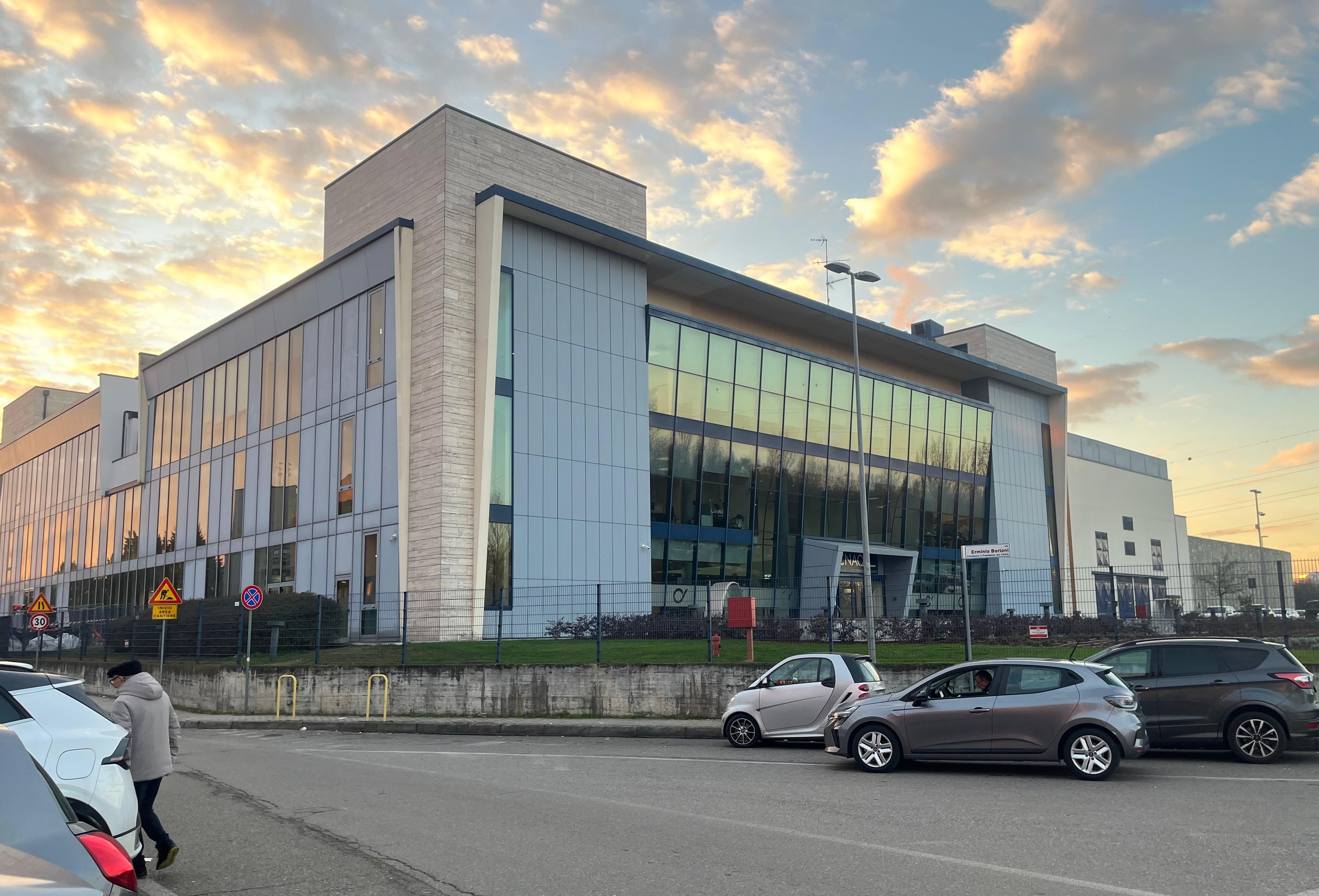
CNAO at Pavia, the only facility in Italy and one of six facilities in the world capable of Carbon Ion Hadrontherapy.

The Harvey(in English) Medicine and Surgery Course at the University of Pavia is the oldest medical program taught entirely in English in Italy, started in 2009. Admission to Medicine and Surgery program is based on yearly national entrance exam called IMAT for English course(Harvey) offering 103 spots for EU applicants and 40 for non-EU student, while the filter semester (Italian: Semestre Filtro) replaced the previous multiple-choice entrance test from 2025/26 for Golgi(in Italian) Medicine and Surgery course.. In IMAT 2025, 557 non-EU students applied out of which only 40 students got admitted, it had the highest cutoff with acceptance rate of just 7.18% for the non EU. Situated beside the Policlinico San Matteo and Health campus is the National Center of Oncological Hadrontherapy (CNAO in Italian; acronym for Centro Nazionale di Adroterapia Oncologica ), one of only six facilities in the world to be able to perform hadrontherapy with both proton and carbon ions. Under the impulsion of Ugo Amaldi,Geneva based CERN hosted and contributed to the Proton-Ion Medical Machine Study (PIMMS) which evolved into final CNAO accelerator whose design was later implemented to MedAustron centre in Wiener Neustadt, Austria. Also close to the Health campus is LENA (acronym for Laboratorio Energia Nucleare Applicata), a nuclear reactor produced by General Atomics, used primarily for medical research and inter-disciplinary training activities

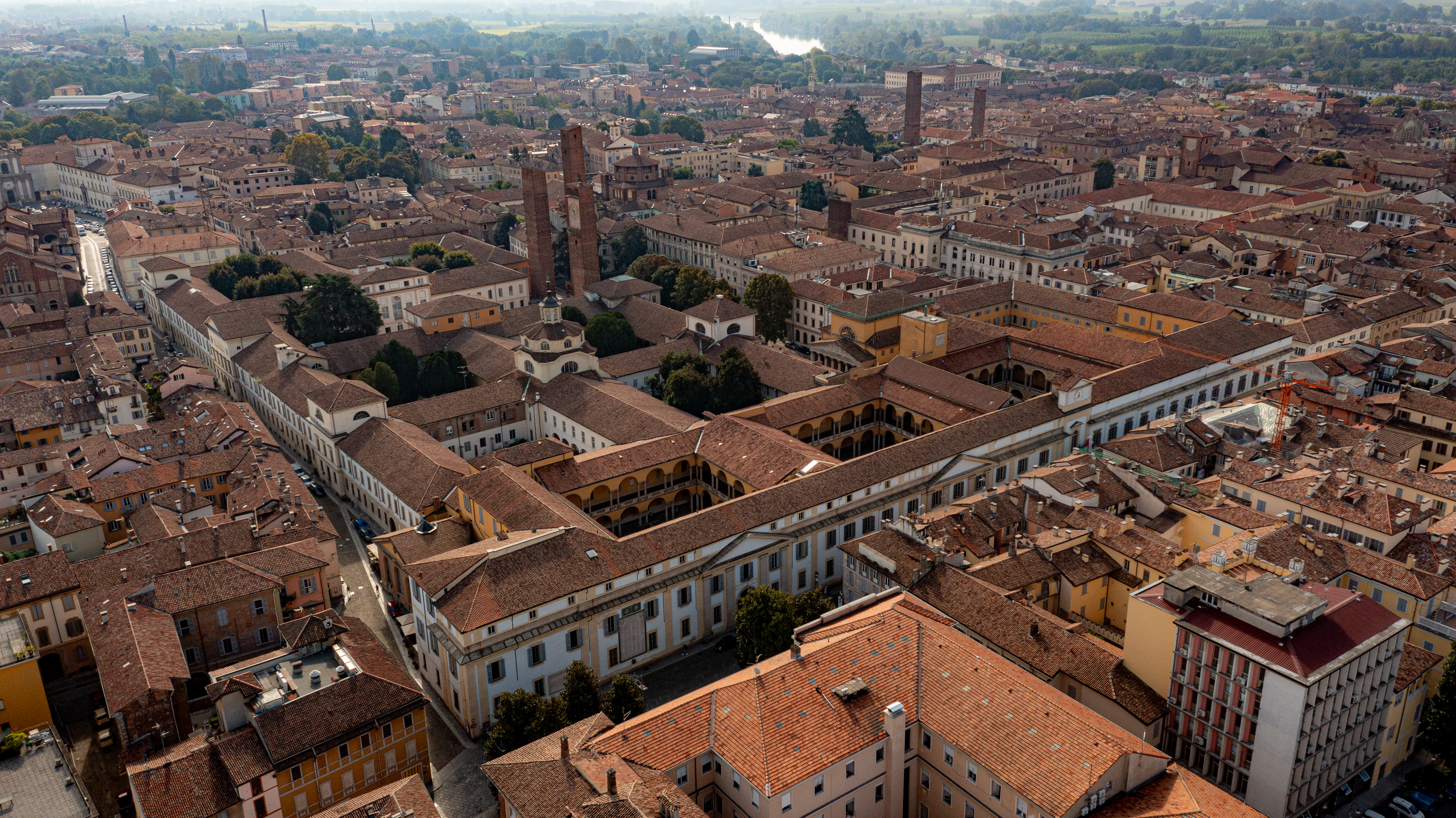
Aerial panaroma of the Central Campus, University of Pavia, with the Towers of Pavia "Torre di Pavia" visible in the distance.

=== Map ===
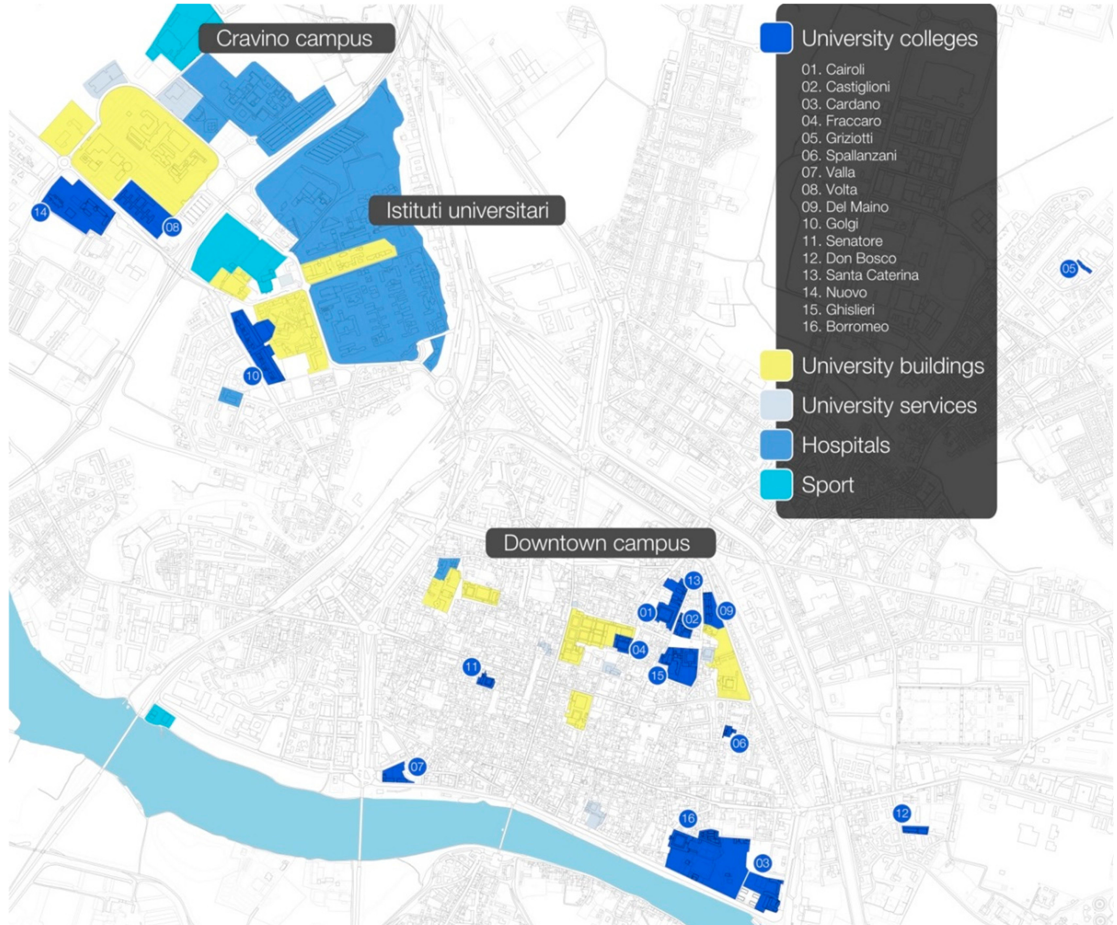
Map of Pavia, with university buildings, colleges, medical structures and university sport facilities. (Scale 1:20,000)

== Museums ==
The university also manages multiple points of interest:

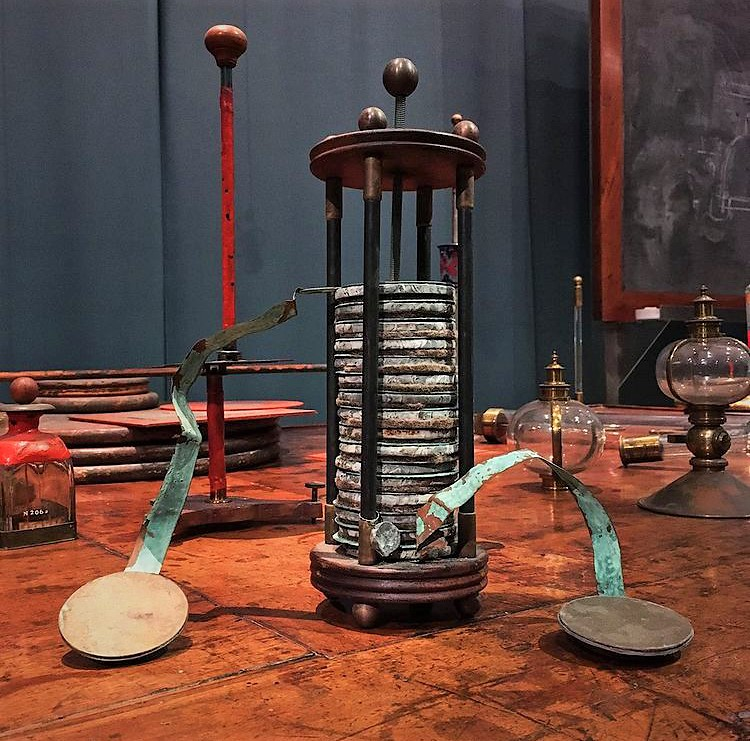
Voltaic pile, University History Museum of the University of Pavia.

=== University History Museum ===
The University History Museum (Italian: Museo per la Storia dell'Università) hosts a large number of scientific instruments, anatomical and pathological preparations and samples, historical documents and volumes which are part of the university's history. The museum has dedicated a hall to Golgi (Italian: Sala Golgi), where more than 80 certificates of honorary degrees, diplomas, Nobel prize and other awards are exhibited. The museum collection includes Antonio Scarpa's preserved severed head.

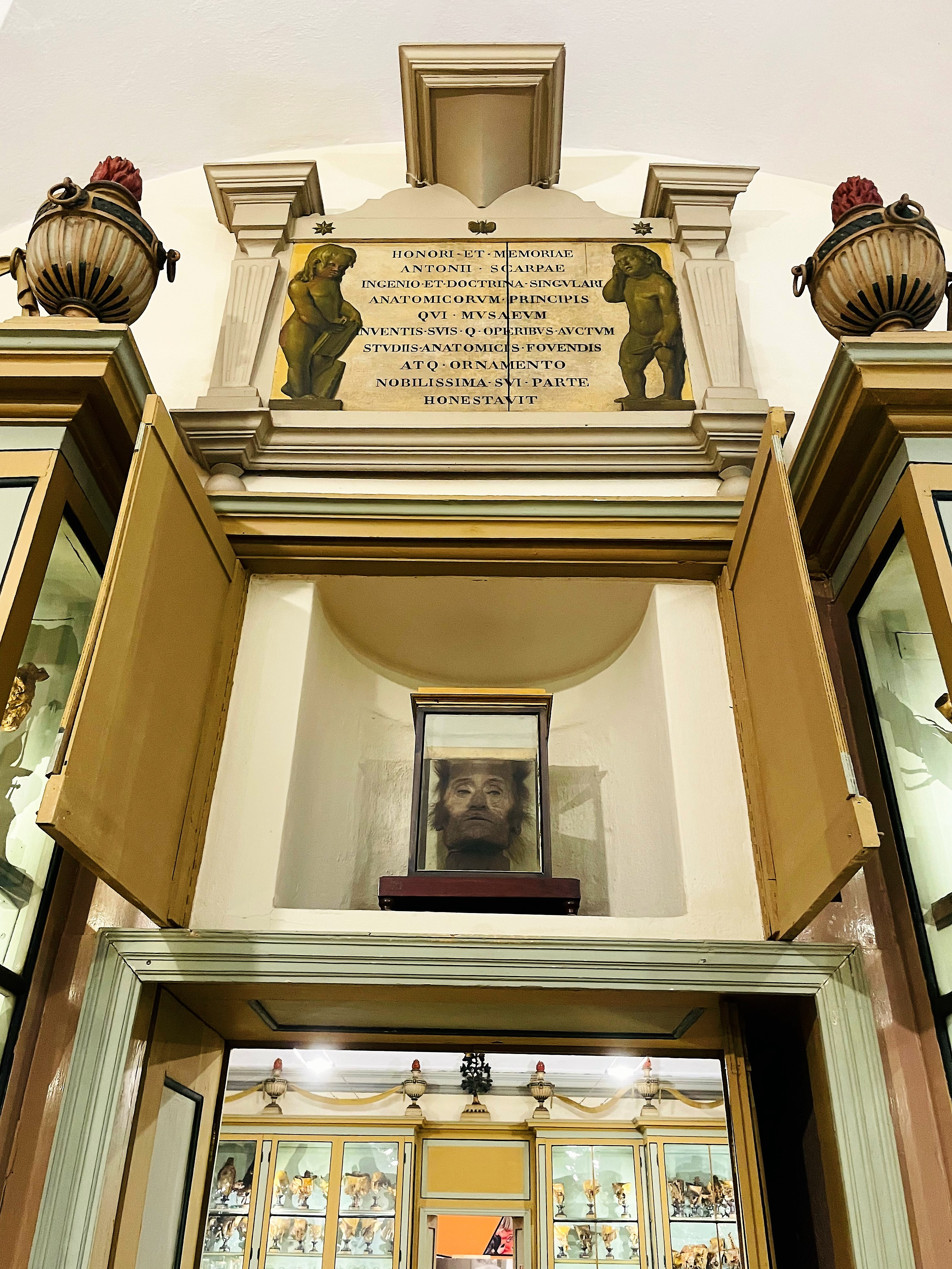
The head of Italian anatomist Antonio Scarpa, University History Museum.

In addition to Scarpa's head, the museum also displays his kidneys and four of his fingers. Other anatomical samples include the aneurysm that killed mathematician Vincenzo Brunacci in 1818, the bladder of naturalist Lazzaro Spallanzani, who died of kidney cancer in 1799 as well as a plaster cast of Alessandro Volta's unusually large skull.

Albert Einstein lived in Pavia from 1895, joining his family after leaving school in Munich, while his father Hermann and uncle Jakob ran the Einstein-Garrone electrotechnical factory; the family resided at Palazzo Cornazzani on Via Ugo Foscolo. There he prepared for the entrance exam to the ETH Zurich, which he entered in October 1895 (initially failing the general portion but excelling in mathematics and physics). In Pavia he also formed a lasting friendship with Ernestina Marangoni, documented by letters (1946–1952) held at the Pavia University museum, and reportedly had informal exchanges with her uncle, physicist Carlo Marangoni (of Gibbs–Marangoni effect fame) during holidays at the family's villa in Casteggio — a possible early influence on Einstein's interest in capillarity, the subject of his first published paper (1901).

Letters from Einstein, on display at the University History Museum.

=== Museum of Electrical Technology ===
The Museum of Electrical Technology (Italian: Museo della Tecnica Elettrica) is intended as a permanent tribute to Alessandro Volta. It has an area of 5,000 sqm, with 3,200 sqm reserved for visitors. It is divided into 5 sections, each section represents a different era of advancements in field of electricity and electronics.

The museum hosts over 4,000 pieces in its collections, including 300 pieces from the Enel collection, 3,028 pieces from the Sirti collection and over 1,000 pieces from the university's own collection. The collection contains devices such as radiotelephones, power supplies, amplifiers, horn loudspeakers, morse telegraphs, radio transmitters and receivers.

In 2017, the museum implemented a 3D tactile map for the blind and disabled. The museum also organizes exhibitions and projects with primary and secondary schools.

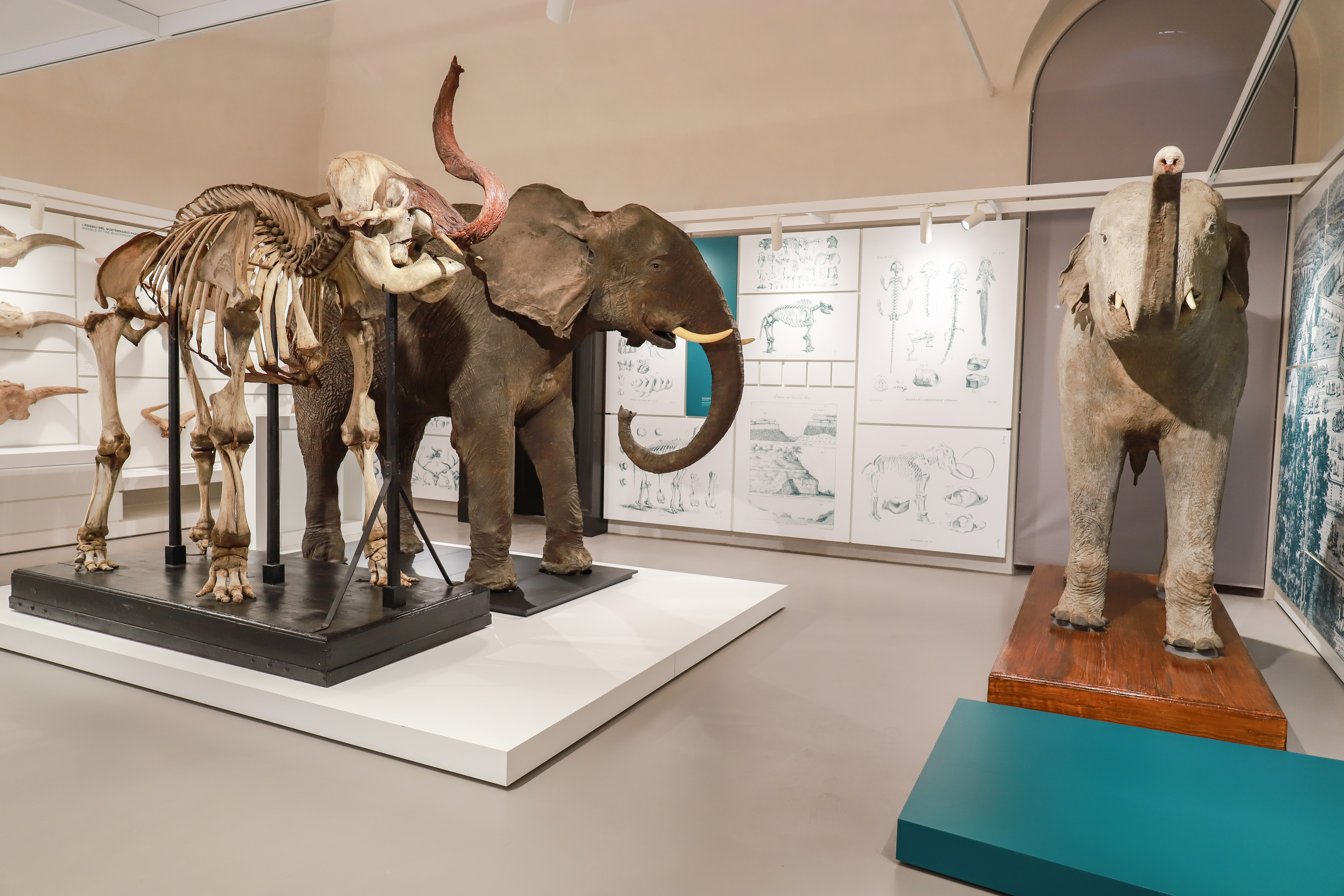
One of the rooms of the Natural History Museum, Pavia with the skeleton of an African elephant and a specimen of the same species in taxidermy and on the right the Asian elephant donated by Napoleon.

=== Museum of Natural History ===
The Museum of Natural History (Italian: Museo di Storia Naturale) dates back to 1769 when Lazzaro Spallanzani became professor on Natural History at the University of Pavia. The museum is divided into three sections — Comparative Anatomy, Zoology and Geopaleontology. The museum is currently located in Palazzo Botta Adorno.

The museum hosts multiple collections including:

- the Spallanzani collection which contains preserved specimens of the Nile crocodile (Crocodylus niloticus), hippopotamus (Hippopotamus amphibius), short-finned mako shark (Isurus oxyrhynchus), bottlenose dolphin (Tursiops truncatus), and small orangutan (Pongo pygmaeus).
- the Zoology collection which contains over 5,000 specimens of vertebrates and invertebrates.
- the Geopaleontology collection which contains over 30,000 fossil specimens, which date back the Pliocene and Miocene eras. The collections also includes 5,000 rocks and minerals and 65 slabs of fish from Bolca deposit.
- the Comparative Anatomy collection which contains more than 5,000 artifacts including skeletons, specimens and anatomical preparations of mainly vertebrates including an elephant, which underwent restoration in 2014.

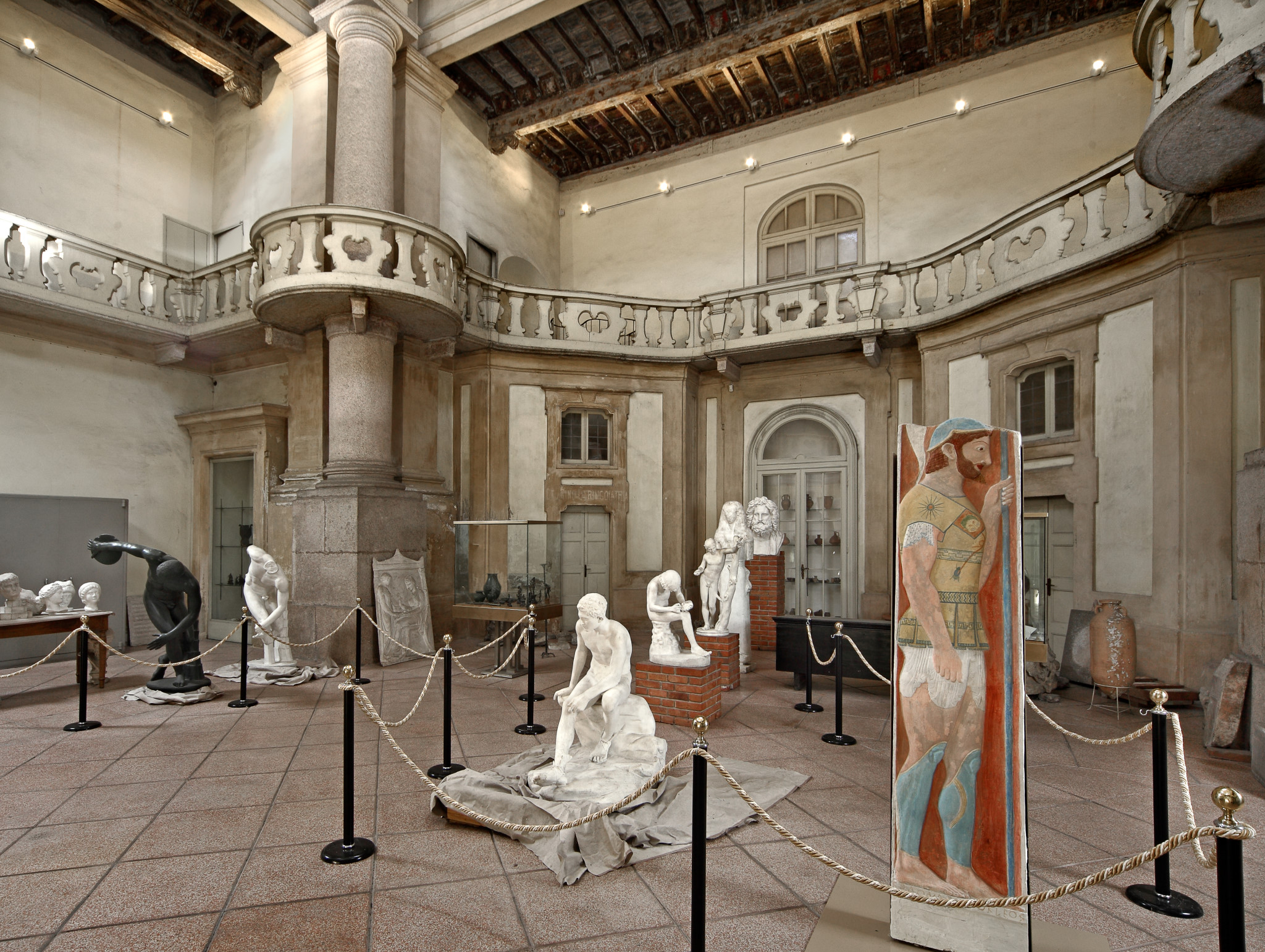
Museum of Archeology, University of Pavia

=== Museum of Archeology ===
The Museum of Archeology (Italian: Museo di Archeologia) had its first collection funded by Pietro Vittorio Aldini in 1819 for education purposes. Now, it houses different collections such as engraved coins and gems from the late Roman empire, Celtic and Byzantine eras, potteries, figurines dating back to 2000 BC and a pair of mummies.

=== Museum Camillo Golgi ===
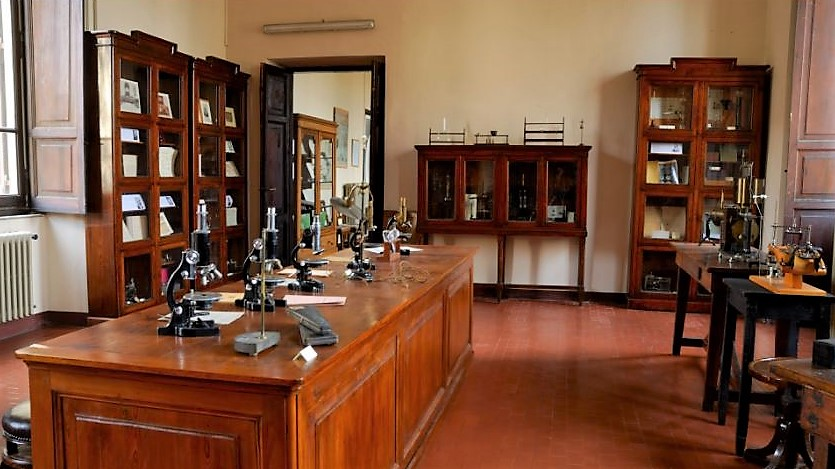
Museum Camillo Golgi, the laboratory, with the original tools, used by Camillo Golgi and his students

The Museum Camillo Golgi (Italian: Museo Camillo Golgi) was built in honor of Camillo Golgi and his most important discoveries, the black reaction to visualize neurons as well as his studies on malaria. The museum hosts a collection of his scientific publications and instruments used such as syringes, microtomes, microscopes, original photographic plates of histological preparations, all dating back to the 1900s. The museum was set in the same building where he conducted most of his experiments via the Institute of General Pathology.

=== Pavia Botanical Garden ===
The Pavia Botanical Garden (Italian: Orto Botanico), which was established at the end of the 18th century, covers an area of 2 hectares. The botanical gardens host a seed and herbarium bank at its educational center, Bosco Siro Negri Park Reserve. The garden hosts a variety of plant collections including roses, orchids as well as other plant species native to Lombardy.

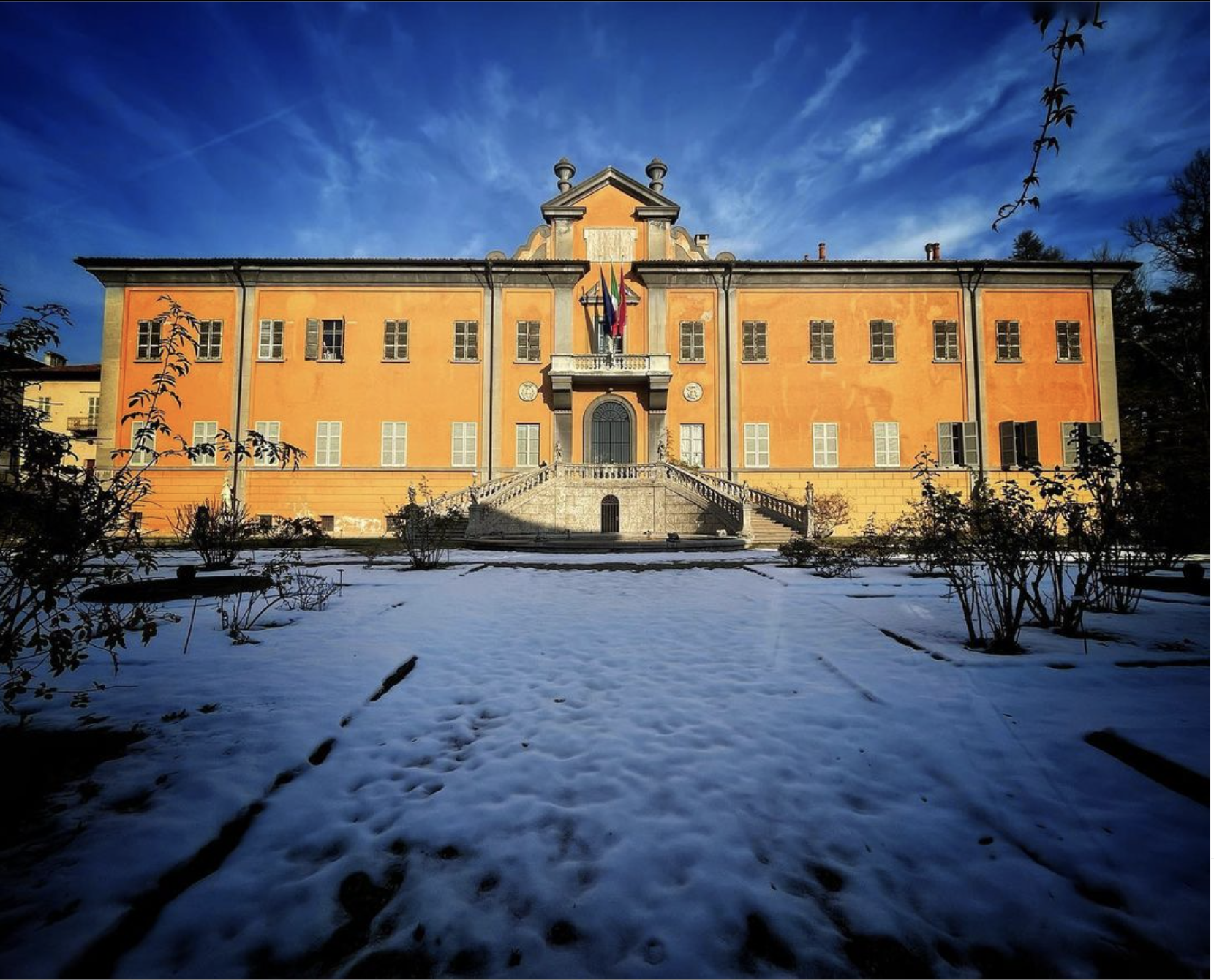
Pavia Botanical Garden, 1773

=== Museum of Mineralogy ===
The Museum of Mineralogy (Italian: Museo di Mineralogia) originated from a section dedicated to minerals in the Museum of Natural History. The museum hosts a large collection of rocks and minerals, categorized systematically. The collection also includes minerals from different Italian regions. In 1923. Professor Angelo Bianchi donated rock samples which he had collected earlier in his career. Each sample was meticulously described in details in his various scientific publications.

The museum also displays a collection of meteorites which fell around Siena at the end of the 18th century and were collected by Lazzaro Spallanzani.

=== Center of Manuscripts ===
The Center of Manuscripts (Italian: Centro di ricerca sulla tradizione manoscritta di autori moderni e contemporane or Italian: Centro Manuscritto) was formally established on 24 January 1980; however, in 1969, Maria Corti, a professor at the University of Pavia, had an idea to set up a Manuscript Fund (Italian: Fondo Manoscritti), dedicated to preserving writings and manuscripts from twentieth-century authors. The center hosts a collection of writings and manuscripts from writers of the last two centuries including manuscripts and papers handwritten by the poet Eugenio Montale, as well as various autographed editions of the novel the Philosophy of Madonna (Italian: La Madonna dei filosofi) by Carlo Emilio Gadda, and an annotated edition of the manuscript for My Cousin Andrea (Italian: Mio cugino Andrea) by Romano Bilenchi. The collection preserved by the center covers more than 200 authors.

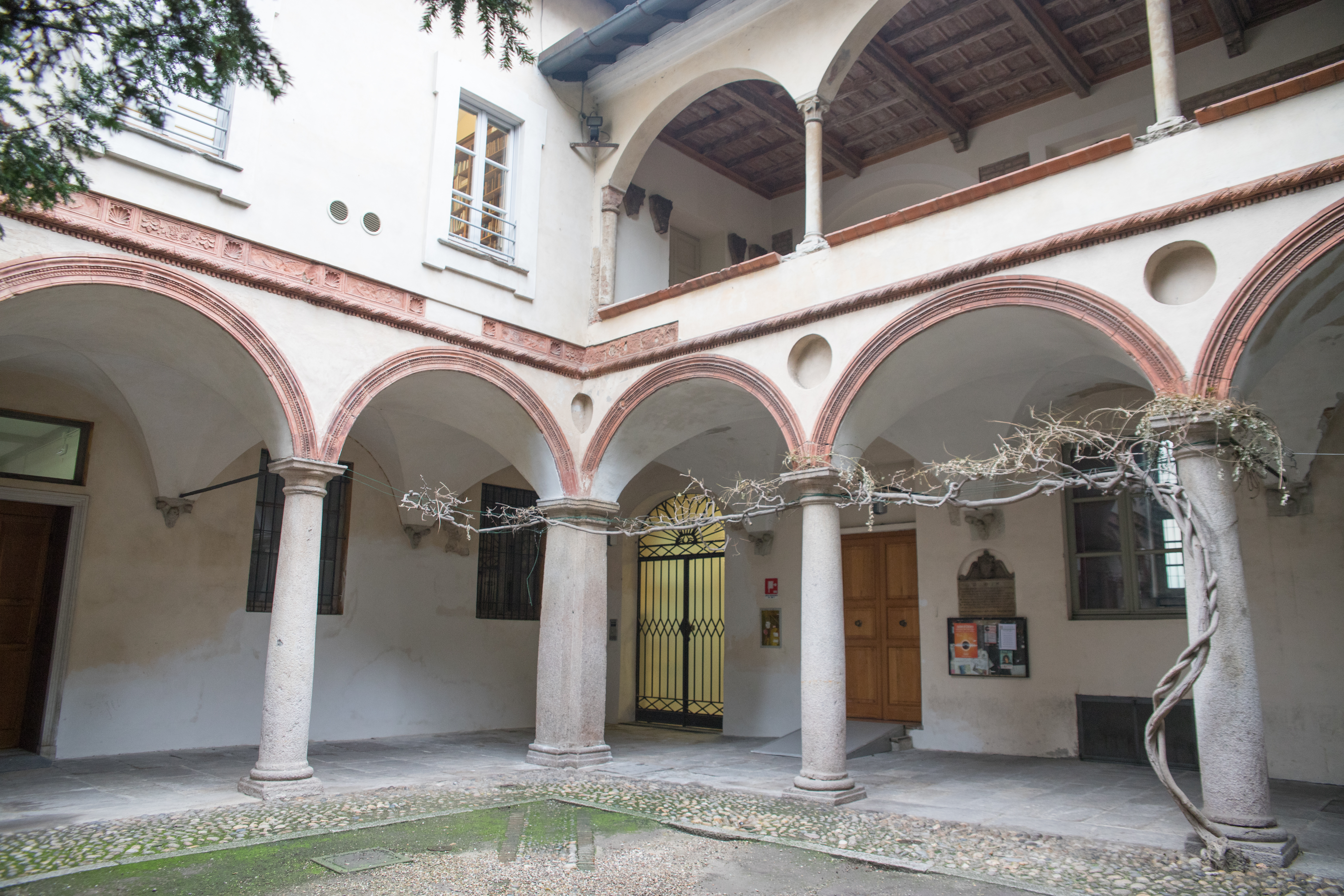
Center of Manuscripts

The center is located at the Palazzo Centrale of the University of Pavia, and a branch is recently added to one of the university's sites at Via Luino.

=== Other collections ===
The university also hosts special collections which are accessible only by appointments. These collections are not accessible by the public:

- Physiology collections covers 300 various instruments used in physiological research, such as galvanometers, scales, devices for measuring tactile sensation and pain sensitivity and so on. The collection is hosted by the Department of Molecular Medicine.
- Histology and embryology collections covers over 10,000 histological slides of different tissues and organs, embryological models in wax as well as microscopes and other instruments. The collection is hosted by the Department of Experimental Medicine.
- Musicology collections covers about 1,100 works including 80 musical instruments such as aerophones, chordophones and idiophones, as well as thousands of perforated rolls for antique pianos. The collection is hosted by the Department of Music.
- Cattaneo collection covers preserved anatomical and histological preparations in the fields of osteology, angiology, splanchnology, esthesiology, neurology and topographic anatomy. The collection is hosted by the Public Health, Neurosciences, Experimental and Forensic Medicine.

== Academics ==
The university offers degree programmes in two languages:

- Italian – Most of the courses in the University of Pavia are taught in Italian.
- English – One single-cycle master's degree, one undergraduate degree and eight master's degrees are offered in English. These degrees are:

1. Three-year undergraduate degree in Artificial intelligence
2. Six-year degree in Medicine and Surgery
3. Master's degree in Molecular Biology and Genetics (MBG)
4. Master's degree in Electronic Engineering
5. Master's degree in Computer Engineering
6. Master's degree in Industrial Automation Engineering
7. Master's degree in International Business and Entrepreneurship (MIBE)
8. Master's degree in Economics, Finance and International Integration (MEFI)
9. Master's degree in World Politics and International Relations
10. Master's degree in Psychology, Neuroscience and Human Sciences

== Colleges ==
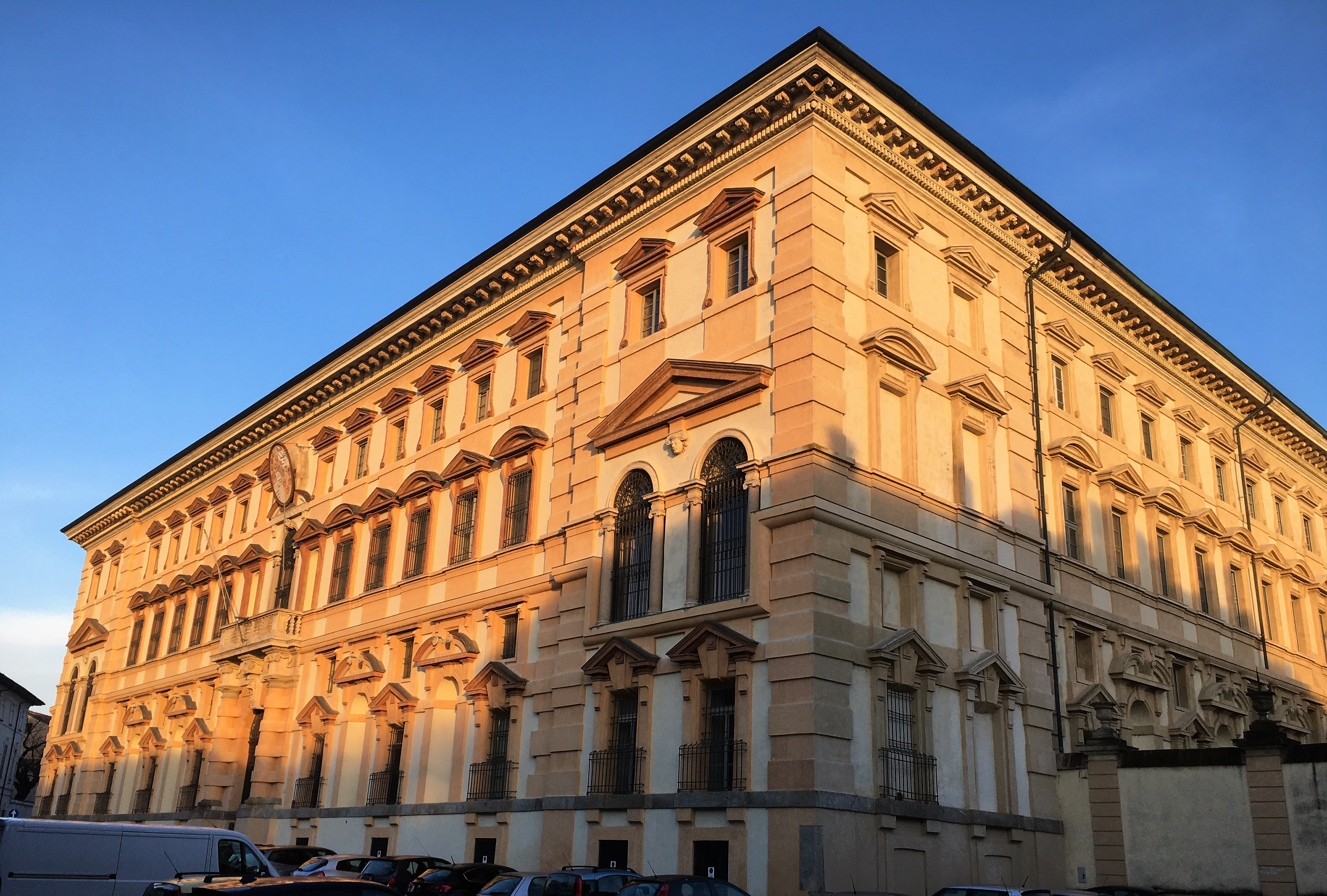
Collegio Borromeo

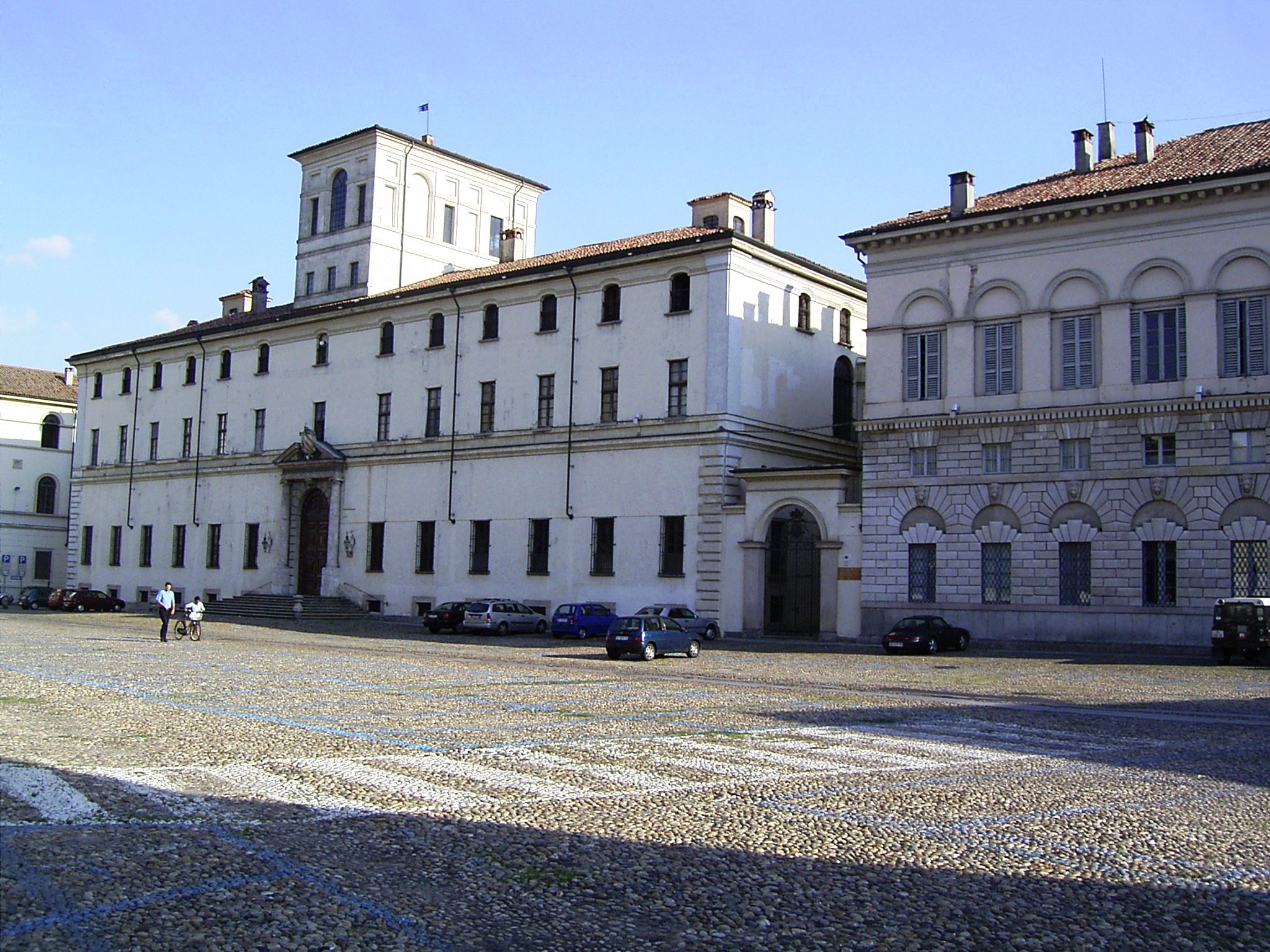
Collegio Ghislieri

The university has one of the most extensive colleges and residence halls in Italy, which house the majority of its students. These colleges are:

=== EDISU public colleges ===
EDISU Pavia is an agency established by the university in order to manage activities and services related to the right of study. It manages 4 refectories and 12 public colleges, which are:

- Collegio Fratelli Cairoli (male)
- Collegio Gerolamo Cardano (male and female)
- Collegio Lazzaro Spallanzani (male)
- Collegio Lorenzo Valla (mixed)
- Collegio Castiglioni-Brugnatelli (female)
- Collegio Plinio Fraccaro (male)
- Collegio Benvenuto Griziotti (male and female)
- Residenze Golgi I and II (male and female)

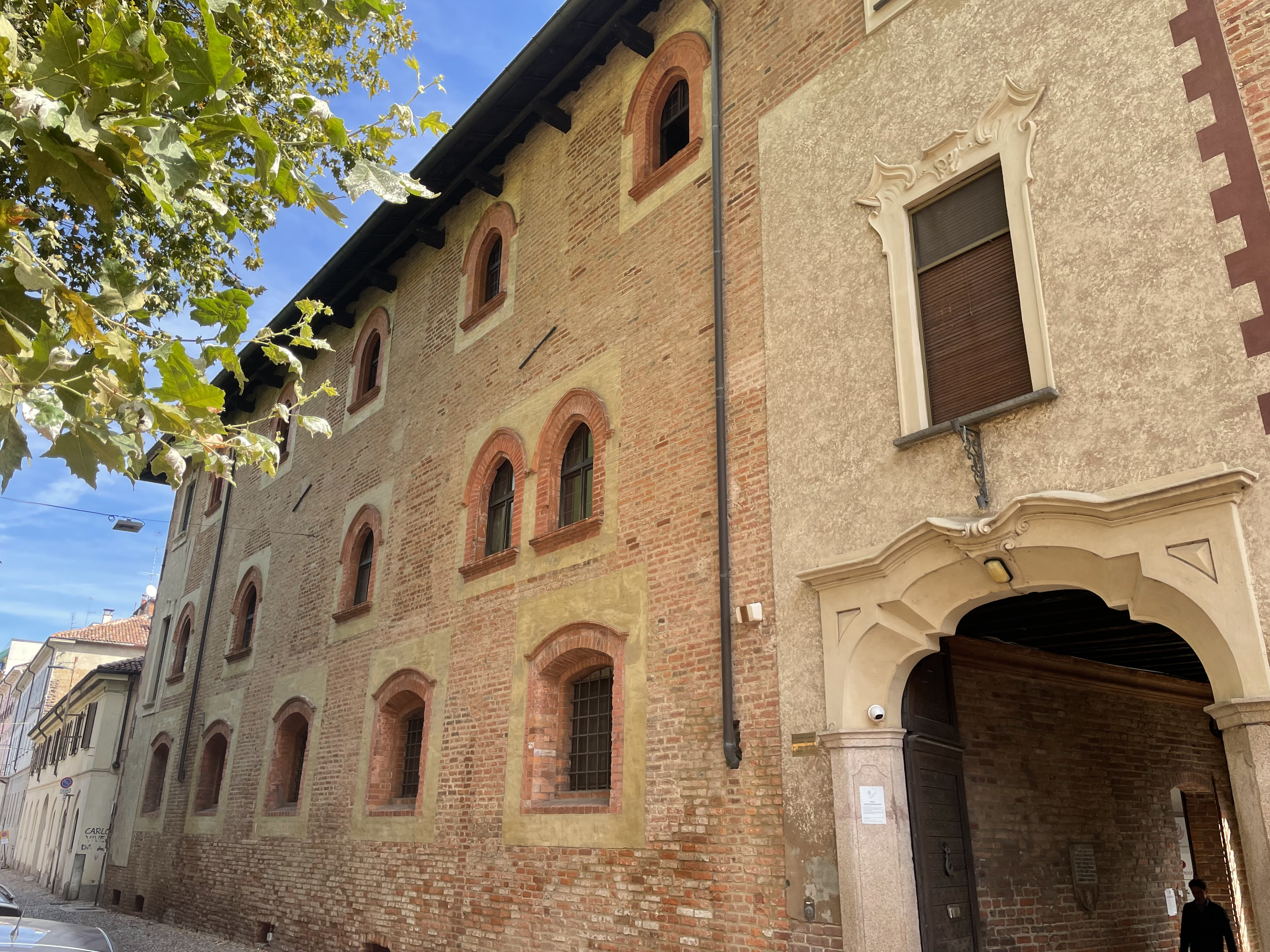
Collegio Castiglioni Brugnatelli

- Collegio Alessandro Volta (male and female)
- Collegio Giasone del Maino (male and female)
- Collegio Universitario Quartier Novo

=== Private and public colleges ===
- Collegio Borromeo (male and female)
- Collegio Ghislieri (male and female)
- Collegio Nuovo (female)
- Collegio Santa Caterina da Siena (female)

== Notable alumni and academics ==
- Luigi Cremona, mathematician
- Giovanni Antonio Scopoli, naturalist
- Marco Fraccaro, geneticist
- Agostino Bassi, entomologist
- Edoardo Storti, hematologist
- Leopoldo Maggi, zoologist
- Charles Borromeo, archbishop
- Michele Ghislieri, Pope Pio V
- Cesare Beccaria, jurist and philosopher
- Eugenio Beltrami, mathematician and physician
- Sigismondo Boldoni, writer, philosopher, physician
- Gerolamo Cardano, mathematician, physician, astrologer and gambler
- Luigi Luca Cavalli-Sforza, population geneticist
- Anthony William Fairbank Edwards, geneticist
- Paolo Ettore Gamba, 2013 Fellow of the Institute of Electrical and Electronics Engineers (IEEE)
- Alfonso Giacomo Gaspare Corti, physician and scientist
- Baldus de Ubaldis, jurist
- Contardo Ferrini, jurist
- Ugo Foscolo, writer, revolutionary and poet
- Guglielmo Gasparrini, botanist and mycologist
- Camillo Golgi, Nobel prize in Physiology or Medicine
- Giulio Natta, Nobel prize in Chemistry
- Otto Ohlendorf (1907–1951), SS general and Holocaust perpetrator, executed for war crimes
- Gian Domenico Romagnosi, jurist, philosopher and economist
- Carlo Rubbia, Nobel prize in Physics
- Antonio Scarpa, physician and scientist
- Dionysios Solomos, poet
- Lazzaro Spallanzani, biologist
- Lorenzo Valla, humanist and philologist
- Alessandro Volta, scientist, developer of the first electric cell
- Marcantonio della Torre, anatomy mentor of Leonardo da Vinci
- Angela Agostini, botanist and mycologist
- Giulio Tremonti, politician and lawyer
- Paolo Giudici, data scientist
- Antonio Lanzavecchia, immunologist
- Carlo Marangoni, physicist
- Luigi Valentino Brugnatelli, chemist
- Ruggiero G. Boscovich, mathematician, astronomer
- Giulio Bizzozero, pathologist
- Simone Stratico, engineer
- Giuseppe Sanarelli, hygienist
- William Sharpey, anatomist
- Enrico Caffi, priest
- Giuseppe Antonio Borgnis, engineer
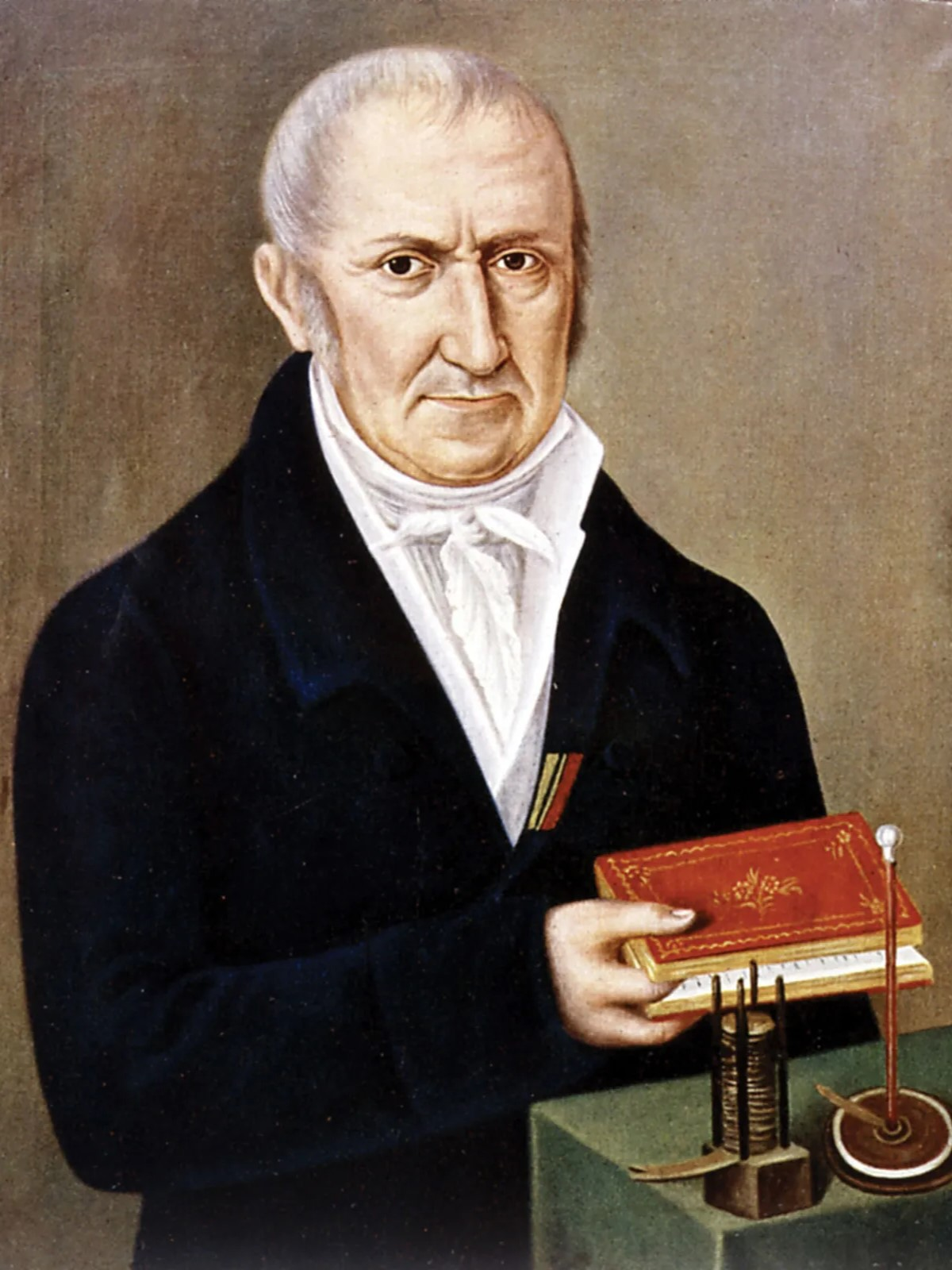
Alessandro Volta, Chair of Experimental Physics, (1778–1804); Elected as Rector in 1785. Inventor of the electric battery and discovered methane.

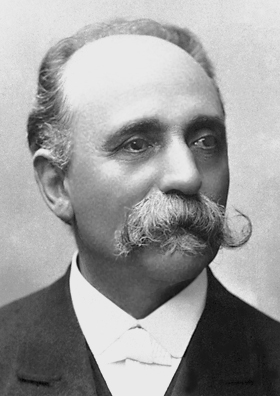
Camillo Golgi, First Italian to receive Noble Prize in 1906, for his works on the central nervous system. He studied medicine at Pavia and served as rector twice, between (1893-1896) and (1901-1909).

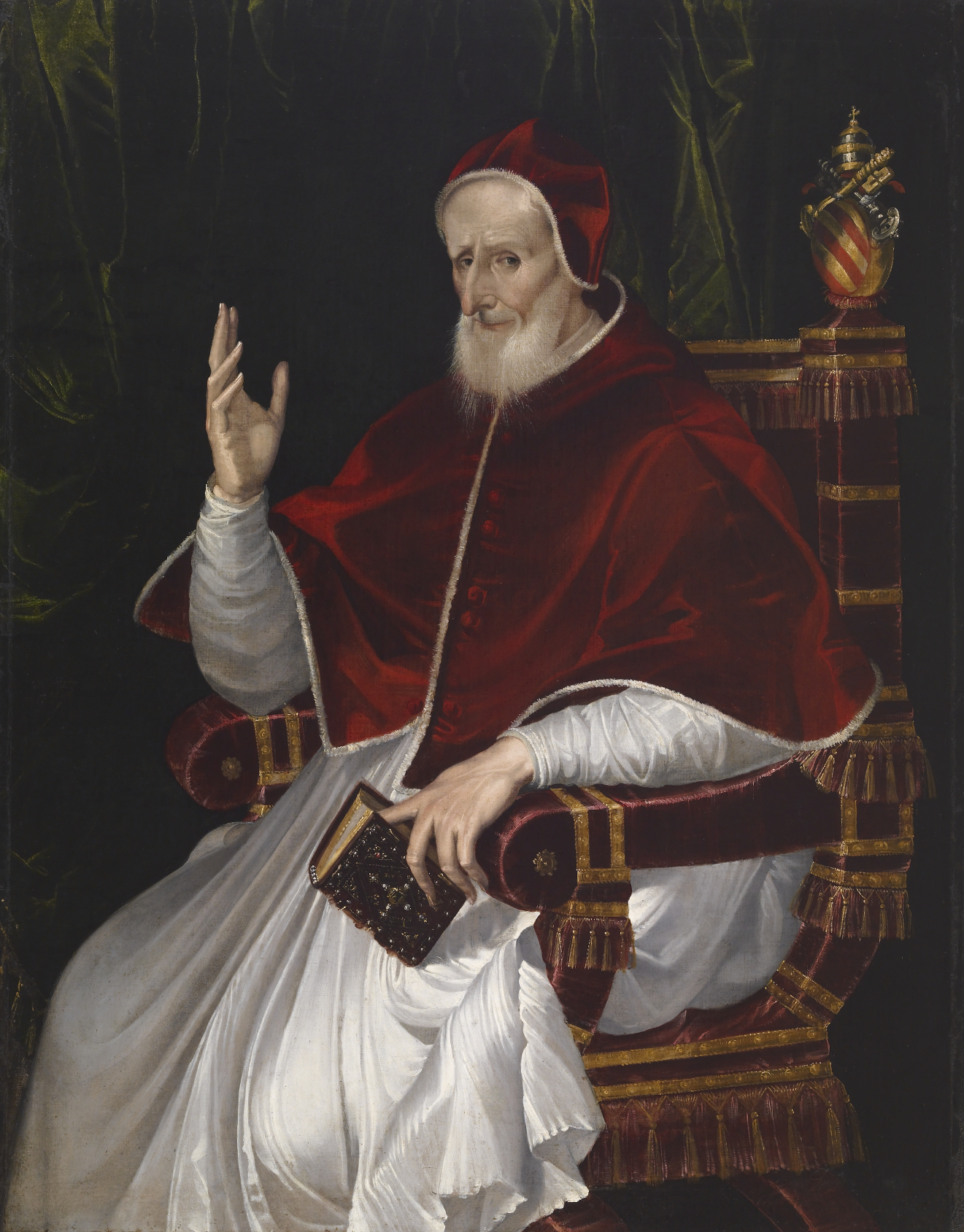
Pope Pius V (born Antonio Ghislieri, 1504–1572) was the 225th pope of the Catholic Church, serving from 1566 until his death on May 1, 1572.

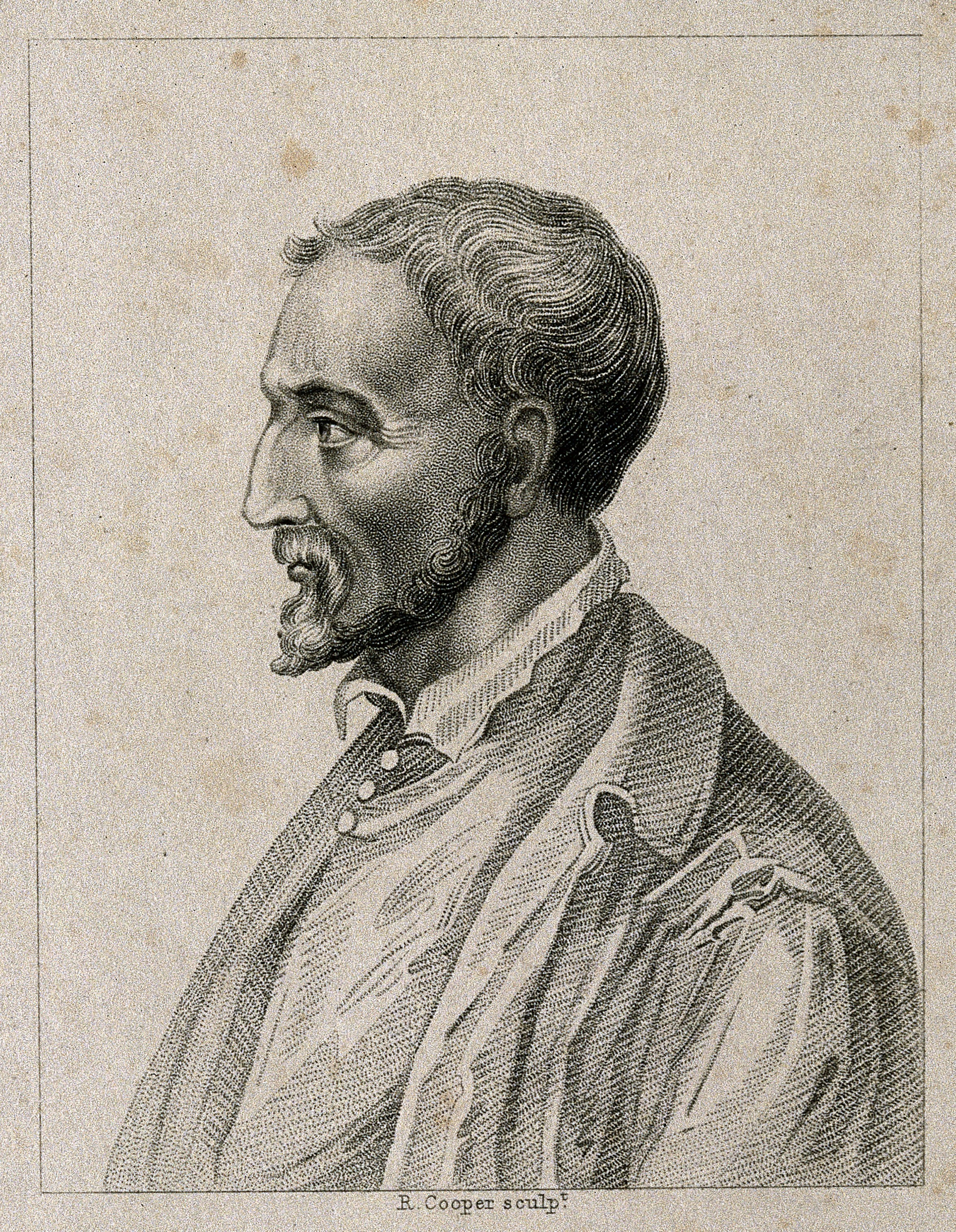
Gerolamo Cardano (1501–1576) was an Italian Renaissance polymath renowned for his contributions to mathematics, medicine, and astrology.

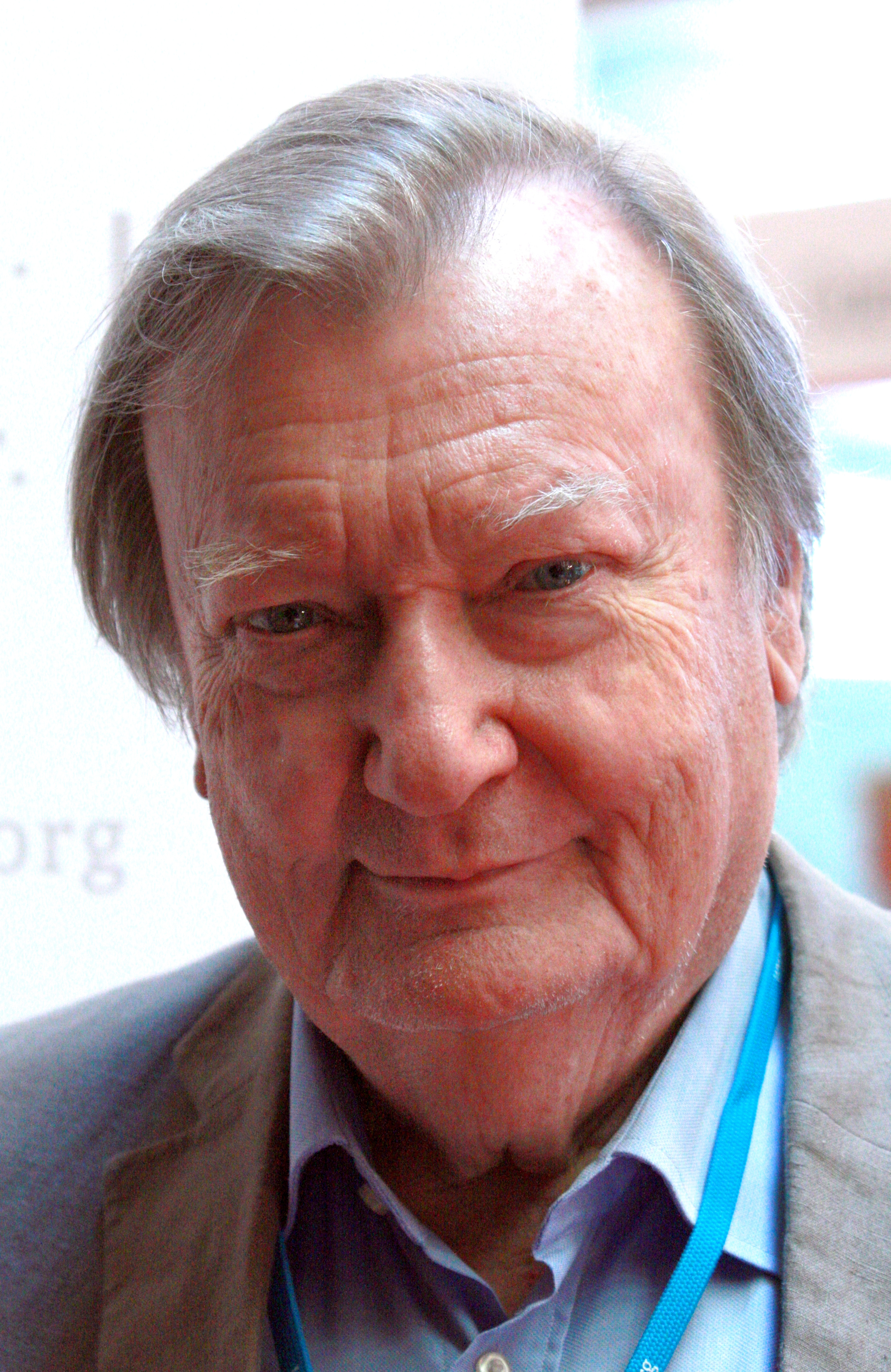
Carlo Rubbia, the Nobel Prize-winning Italian particle physicist, has been Full Professor of Physics at until 2006. He is closely associated with the ICARUS experiment which was developed and operated at the University of Pavia before its transfer to the Gran Sasso National Laboratory.

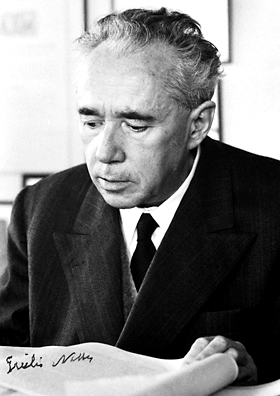
Giulio Natta, the Italian Nobel Prize-winning chemist, was appointed as a full professor and the director of the Institute of General Chemistry of Pavia University in 1933, where he stayed until 1935.

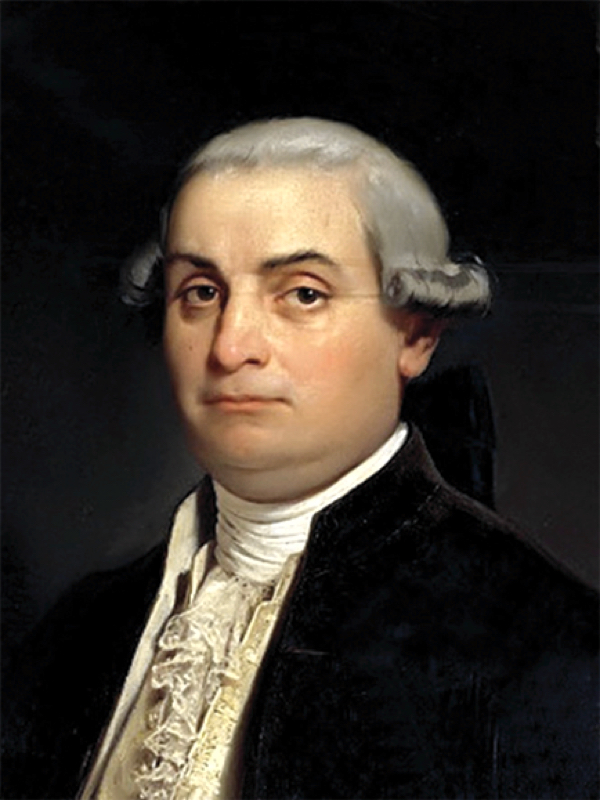
Cesare Beccaria graduated in law from the University of Pavia in 1758. Beccaria is considered the father of modern criminal law and the father of criminal justice. He was also the maternal grandfather of Alessandro Manzoni.

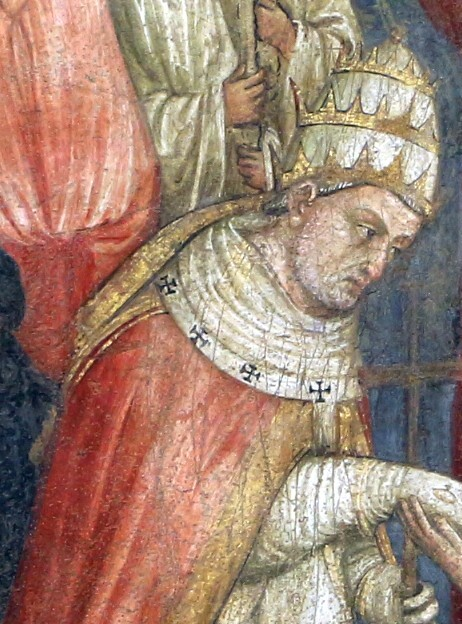
Pope Martin V, born Oddone Colonna, was the 206th pope of the catholic church, from 11 November 1417 to his death in February 1431.His election effectively ended the Western Schism of 1378–1417.

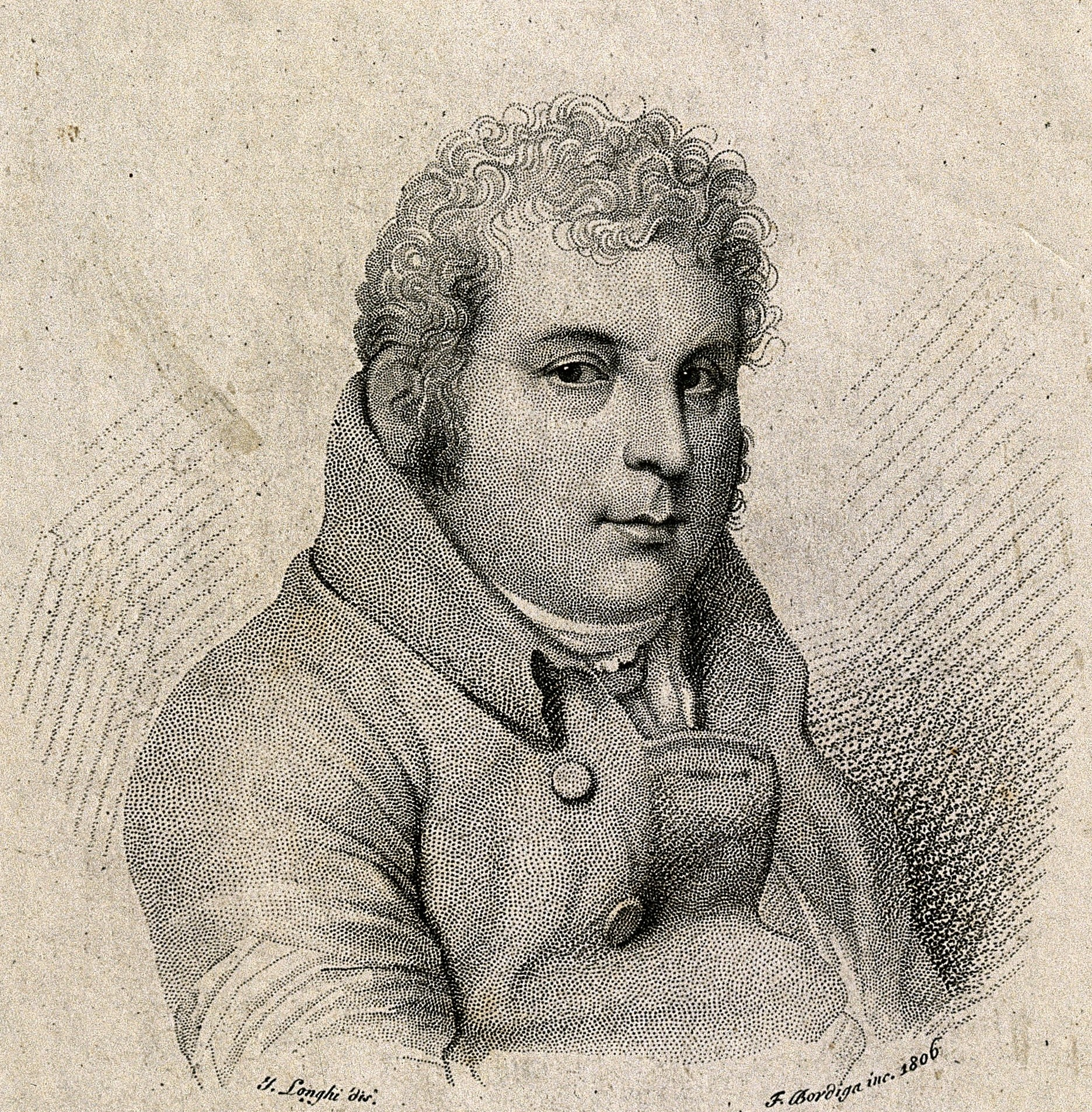
Luigi Valentino Brugnatelli was an Italian chemist and inventor who discovered the process for electroplating in 1805.

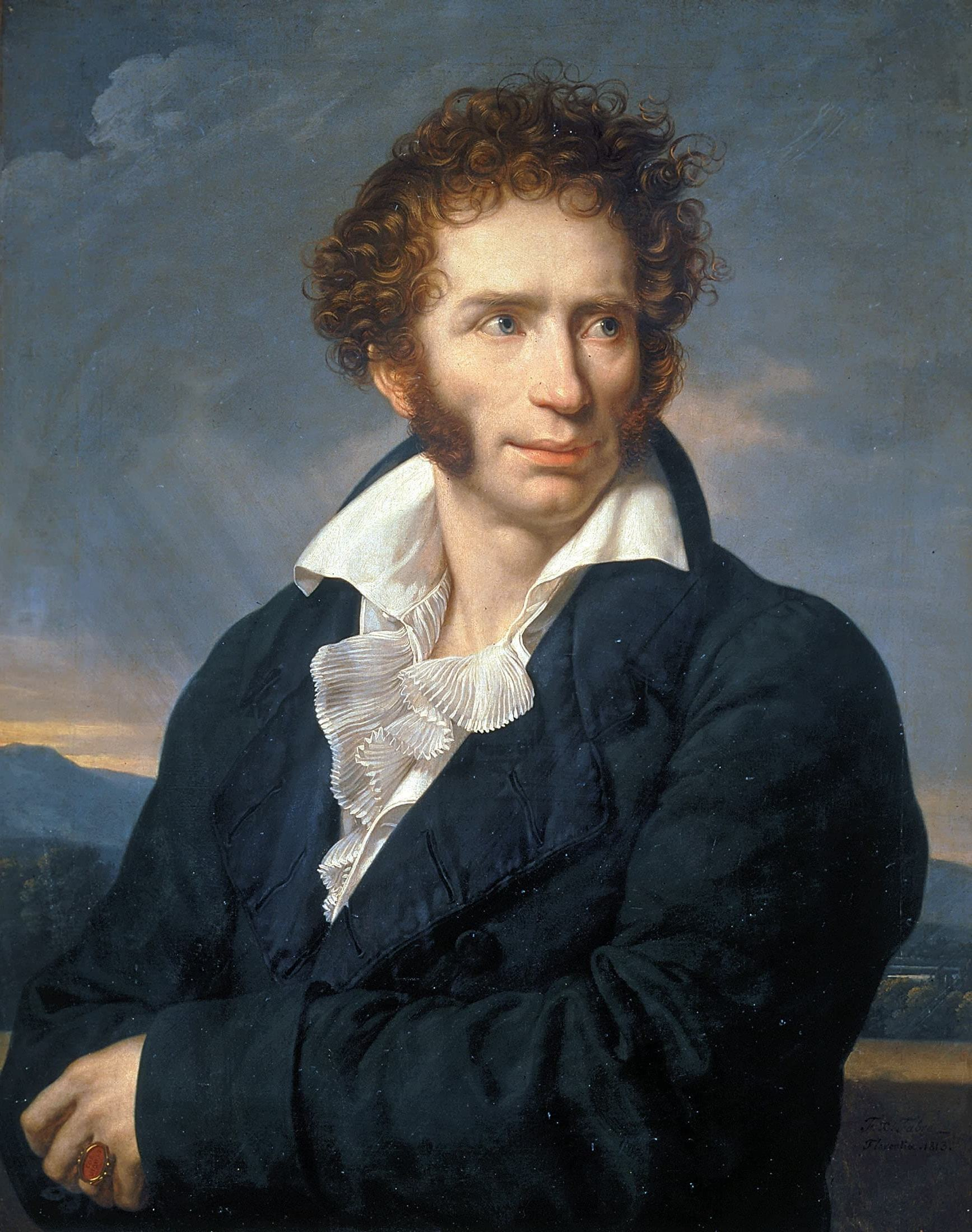
Ugo Foscolo, was an Italian writer, revolutionary and poet. In January 1809, Foscolo was appointed to the chair of Italian rhetoric at the University of Pavia.

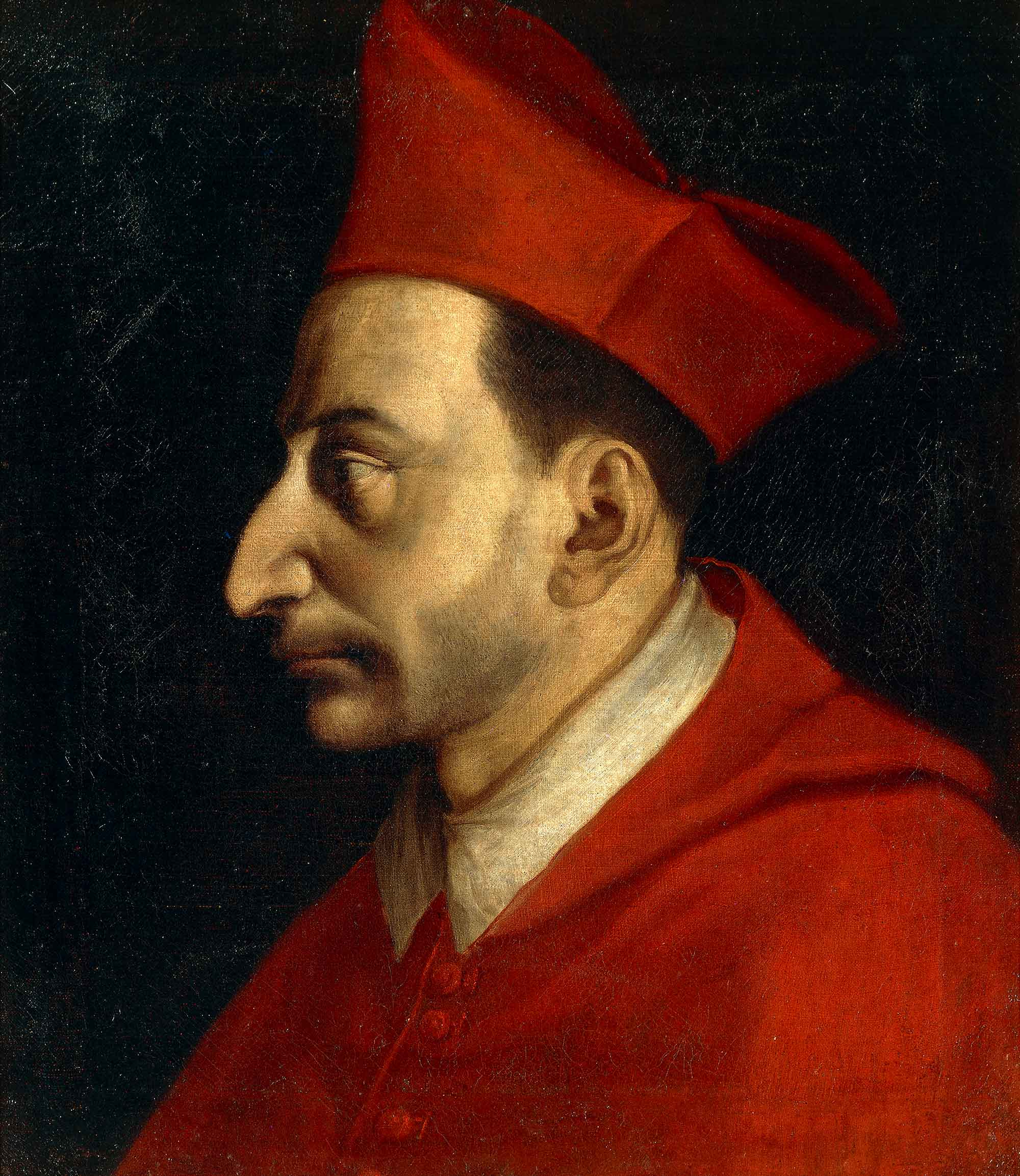
Carlo Borromeo was a leading figure of the Counter-Reformation together with Ignatius of Loyola and Philip Neri. he was responsible for significant reforms in the Catholic Church, including the founding of seminaries for the education of priests. He was canonized in 1610.

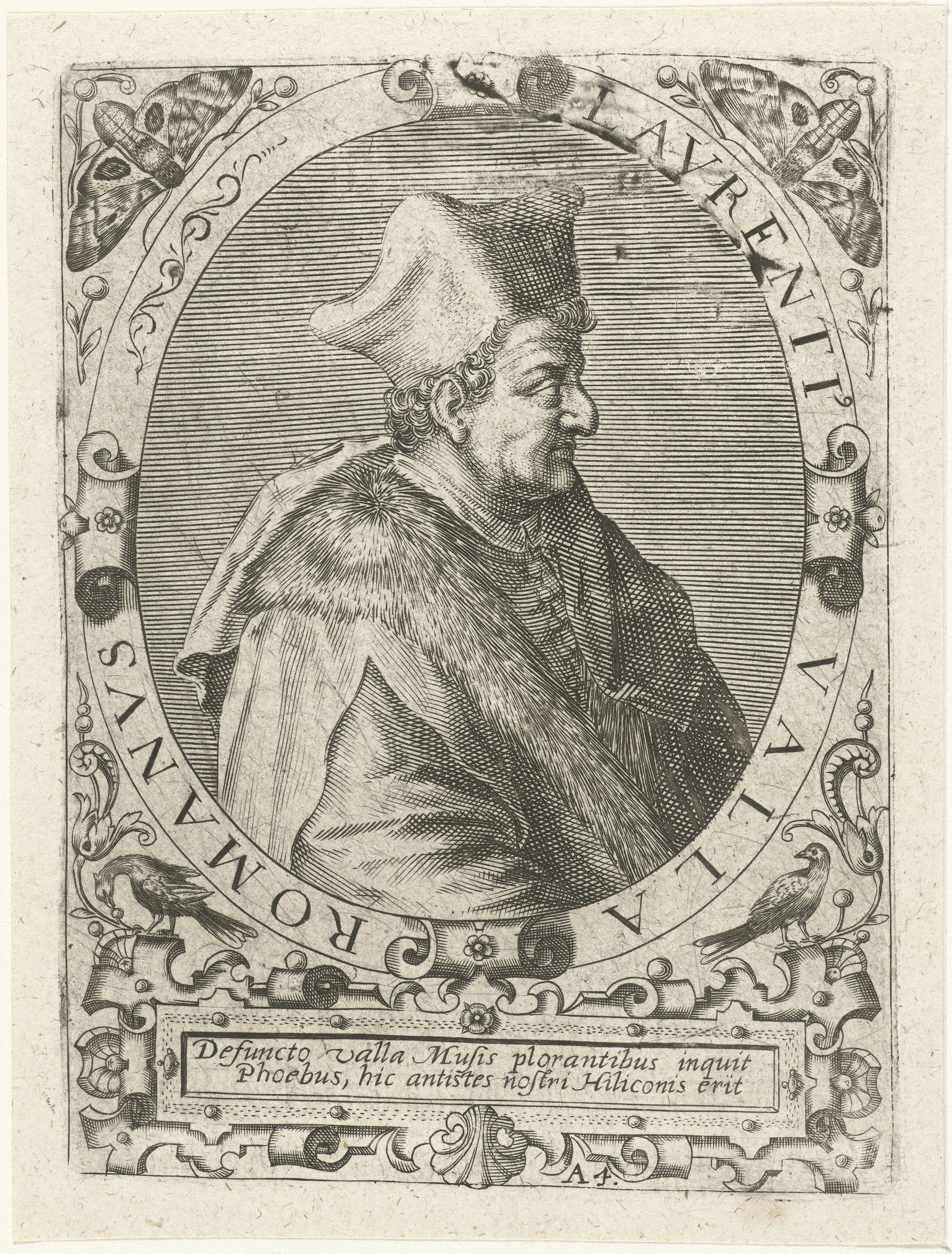
Lorenzo Valla demonstrated that the Donation of Constantine, often cited in support of the temporal power of the Papacy, was a forgery. He is often regarded as one of the fore-runners of Reformation.

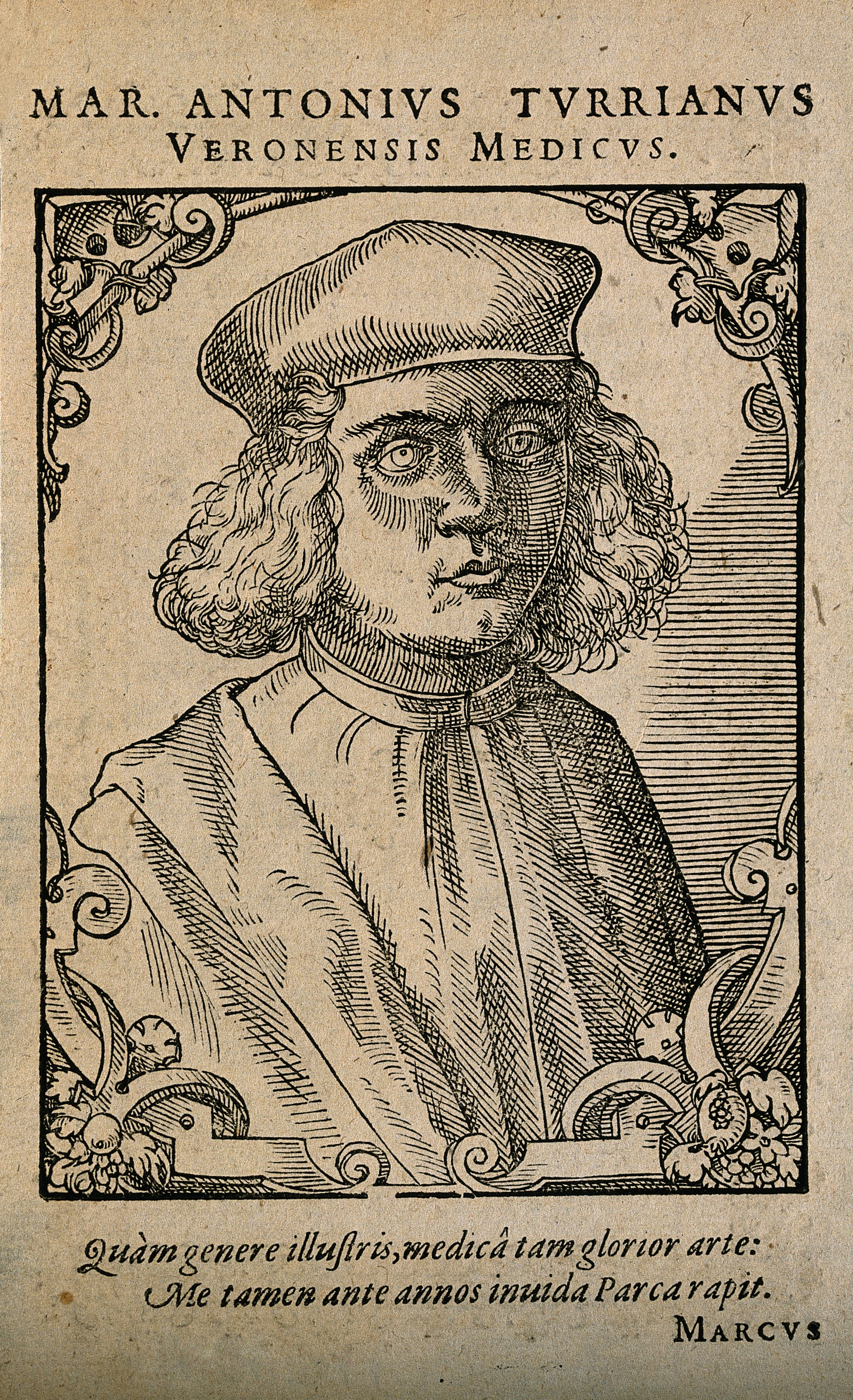
Marcantonio della Torre was a Renaissance Professor of Anatomy. During the winter of 1510-11, Leonardo da Vinci was working alongside him. He may have dissected as many as 20 corpses that winter. These drawings are now known as the 'Anatomical Manuscript A'.

Lazzaro Spallanzani is remembered for having refuted the theory of spontaneous generation with an experiment that will later be taken up and perfected by Louis Pasteur. The first recorded case of artificial insemination was also performed by him in 1784.

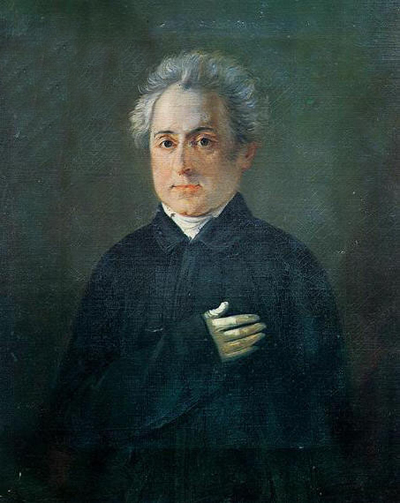
Dionysios Solomos is regarded as the National Poet of Greece for writing "Imnos eis tin Eleftherían" ("Hymn to Liberty"), the first two stanzas of which became the national anthem of Greece.

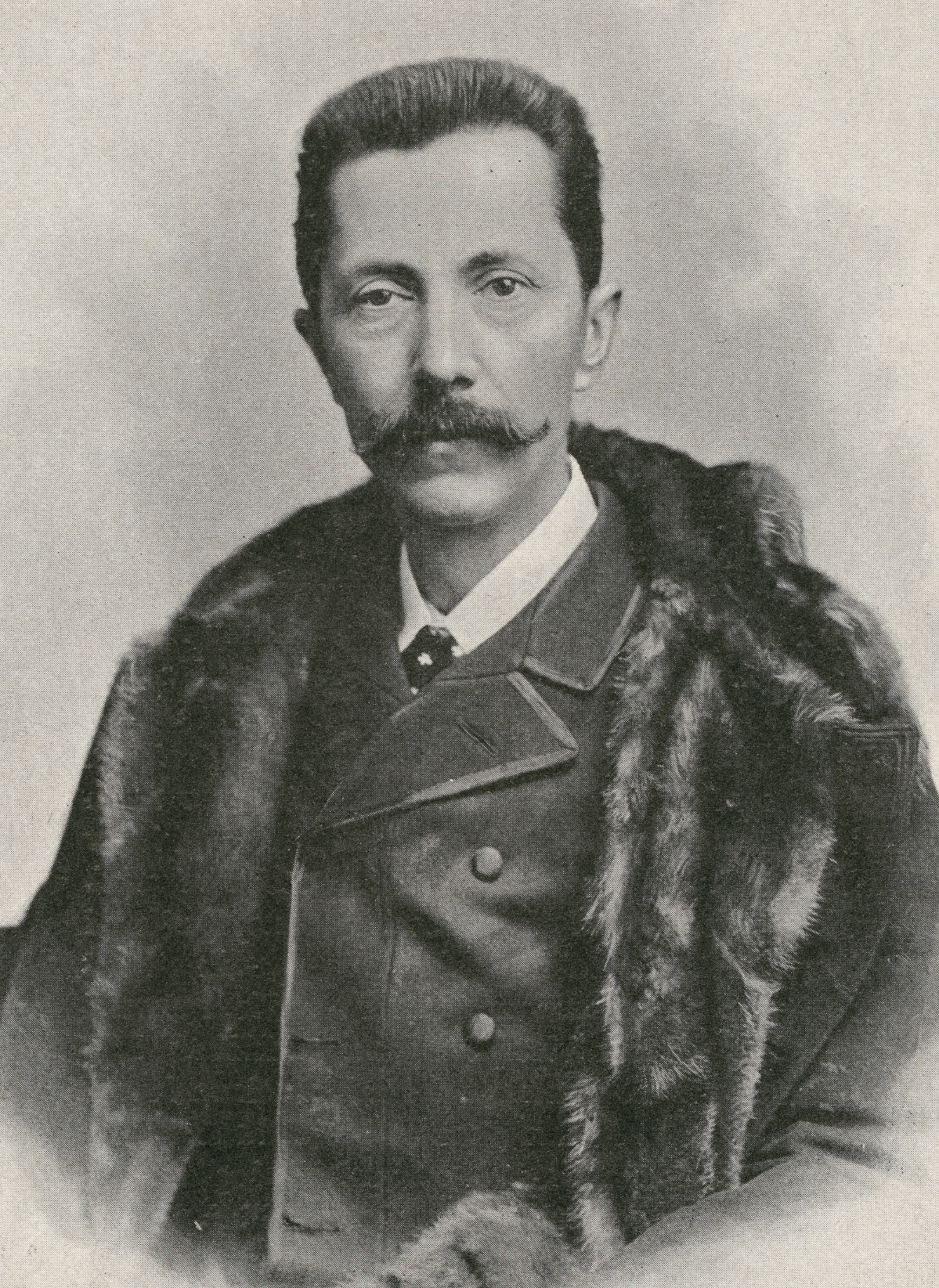
Giulio Bizzozero, a medical doctor, was a pioneer of histology and is credited with the coining of the term platelets and identifying their function in coagulation.

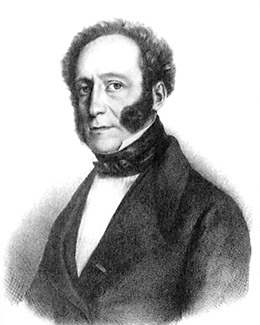
Bartolomeo Panizza, was a highly renowned anatomist, known for being the first physician to attribute the vision function to the posterior cortex. His pupils were, among others, Camillo Golgi, Cesare Lombroso, Andrea Verga and William Sharpey.

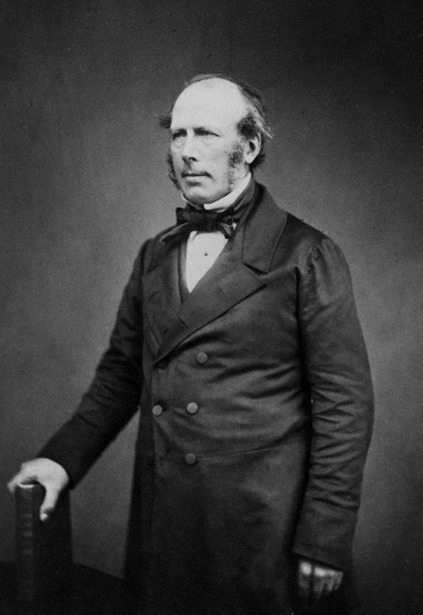
William Sharpey FRS FRSE LLD, was a Scottish physician, regarded as "father of British physiology". He traveled extensively in Europe, training under leading figures such as Dupuytren and Lisfranc in Paris, Panizza in Pavia and Padua, Rudolphi in Berlin, and Tiedemann in Heidelberg.

== Honorary degrees ==
- Agustino Gemelli, psychologist
- Paolo Conte, pianist and composer
- Warren Irkendale, American musicologist
- Roger Bannister, athlete and neurologist
- Kenneth William, Lord Wedderburn of Charlton;
- Pierre Darriulat, physicist
- Karl Alex Müller, 1987 Nobel Prize winner in Physics
- Graham John Hills, physical chemist
- Jerzy Kroh, chemist
- Herbert A. Simon, economist
- Agostino Casaroli, priest
- Richard von Weizsäcker, politician
- Robert Triffin, economist
- Carlo Azeglio Ciampi, politician and banker
- Sandro Molinari, economist
- Carlo M. Cipolla, historian
- Federico Faggin, engineer
- Thomas J. R. Hughes, engineer
- Alvaro Siza Vieira, architect
- Richard Stallman, programmer
- Irene Hijmans-Tromp, linguist
- Giovanni Berlucchi, neurologist
- Theodore Lowi, political scientist
- Salvatore Ruggeri, economist
- Otmar Issing, economist
- Paul Janssen, physician
- Giorgio Strehler, director
- Torsten Wiesel, neurophysiologist
- Marc Tessier-Lavigne, researcher
- Rodolfo Llinas, neuroscientist
- John Eliot Gardiner, conductor
- Christopher G.A. McGregor, physician,
- A. Bernard Ackerman, physician
- Mirjan Damaška, jurist
- Gordon Shepherd, neuroscientist
- Altiero Spinelli, politician
- Gianfranco Acchiappati, physician
- Umberto Mortari, pharmacist
- Alessandro Rigamonti, chemist
- Robert E. Kahn, programmer
- Fritz Leonhardt, structural engineer
- Pasquale Pistorio, engineer
- John Heilbron, historian
- Tomaso Poggio, neuroscientist
- Diana Bracco, chemist
- Aldo Poli, economist

== Medaglia teresiana ==
The Medaglia teresiana is an academic recognition that establishes the entry of a full professor in the University of Pavia. This award can also be conferred by the Rector of the University of Pavia to people who are particularly distinguished, traditionally hosted at the inauguration of the academic year or the day of the graduates:

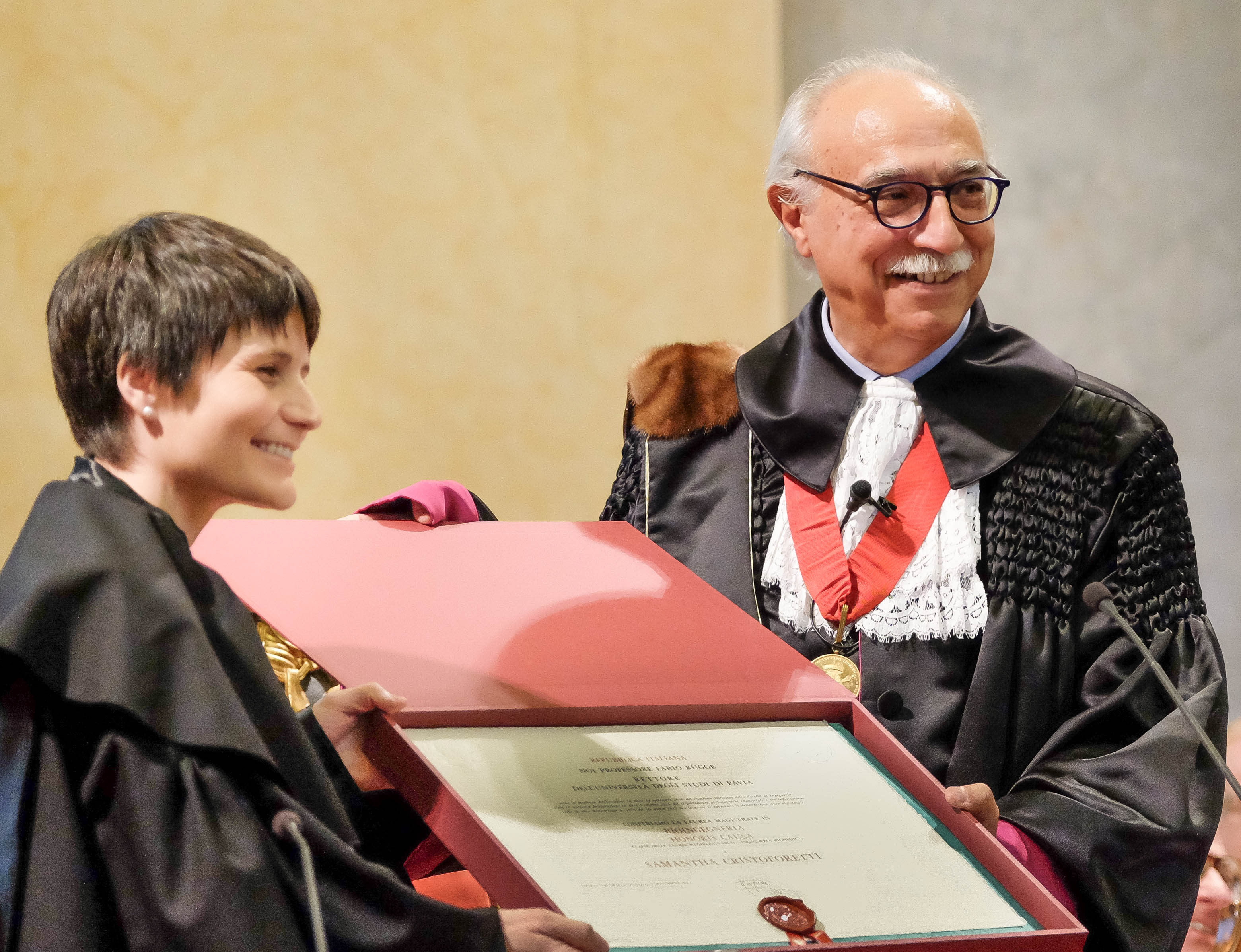
Samantha Cristoforetti was presented with honorary doctorate

- Massimo Inguscio, physicist
- Salomone Ovadia, actor
- Manuel Cardona, physicist
- Barbara Casadei, cardiologist
- Janusz Turkowski, engineer
- Martin M. Block, physicist
- Francesco Lissoni, economist
- Ben Feringa, 2016 Nobel Prize in Chemistry
- Samantha Cristoforetti, astronaut
- Herbert Freeman, computer scientist
- Fabrizio Capobianco, entrepreneur
- Paul Alivisatos, chemist
- Renato Balduzzi, politician
- Beppe Severgnini, journalist
- Eliot Forster, entrepreneur
- Andrea Cavalleri, physicist
- Elena Cattaneo, researcher
- Pietro Grasso, politician
- Jacques Le Goff, historian
- Gerardo Marotta, lawyer and philosopher
- Salvatore Ruggeri, politician
- Iain Mattaj, British biochemist

2016 Nobel Prize in Chemistry, Ben Feringa awarded with the Medaglia teresiana.

== See also ==
- Policlinico San Matteo
- Coimbra Group (a network of leading European universities)
- European University Association
- List of Italian universities
- List of medieval universities
