= Gamba (surname) =

Gamba is an Italian surname. Notable people with the surname include:

- Enrico Gamba (1831–1883), Italian painter
- Ezio Gamba (1958), Italian-Russian judoka and judo coach
- Fran Gamba, 18th century Slovenian politician
- Francesco Gamba (1818–1887), Italian painter, mainly of seascapes
- Giuseppe Gamba (1857–1929), Cardinal of the Roman Catholic Church and an Archbishop of Turin
- Irene M. Gamba (born 1957), Argentine mathematician
- Lucas Gamba (born 1987), Argentine footballer
- Marina Gamba (1570–1612), mother of Galileo Galilei's illegitimate children
- Matteo Gamba (born 1979), Italian rally driver
- Paolo Ettore Gamba, Italian engineer
- Piero Gamba (1936–2022), Italian orchestral conductor and pianist
- Rumon Gamba (born 1972), English conductor
- Sandro Gamba (born 1932), Italian basketball coach and player
- Vincenzo Gamba (1606–1649), Italian musician, son of Galileo Galilei and Marina Gamba
- Virginia Gamba (born 1954), Argentine diplomat
