= Janusz Turowski (professor) =

Polish engineer and professor (1927–2020)

Professor Janusz Turowski (born 30 October 1927 in Kovel, Poland (now in Ukraine), died 18 November 2020 in Łódź) was a Polish engineer. In 1940-46 deported by Soviets to Siberia. Graduated from the TUL with a: MSc and Electr. Engineer 1951, PhD 1958, DSc 1963. Ass. Prof. 1964, Professor 1971 and Full Professor (since 1978) in Electr. Machines and Applied Electromagnetism.

Professor Turowski was Vice Dean (1964–69), Director of the Institute of Electrical Machines and Transformers (1973–92), and Vice-Rector TUL (1990–96) International Co-operation.

Professor Janusz Turowski, full professor (Retired in 2003) in Electrical Machines and Applied Electromagnetics, was Doctor Honoris Causa University of Pavia, Italy (1998), Full Member of the International Academy of Electrotechnical Sciences (1999-), Member of Ukrainian Engineering Academy, Senior Member IEEE (1988-2001), Member of CIGRE-Paris (1964-2001).
