= Paolo Ettore Gamba =

Italian engineer

Paolo Ettore Gamba from the University of Pavia, Pavia, Italy was named Fellow of the Institute of Electrical and Electronics Engineers (IEEE) in 2013 for contributions to very high resolution remote sending image processing of urban areas.
