= Augustine (disambiguation) =

Augustine of Hippo (354–430) was a Church Father.

Augustine may also refer to:

== People ==
- Augustine (actor) (1955–2013), Malayalam film actor
- Augustine of Canterbury (died 604), the first Archbishop of Canterbury
- Saint Augustine (disambiguation)
- Augustine (given name)
  - List of people with given name Augustine
- Augustine (surname), includes a list of people with the surname

== Places ==
- Augustine Volcano, a volcano on Augustine Island
- Augustine Heights, Queensland, a suburb in Ipswich, Australia
- Temple of the Augustinians, Brussels, a former Baroque-style church in Brussels, Belgium
- Les Augustins, a small group of rocks in the archipelago of Îles des Saintes, Caribbean Sea

== Other uses ==
- Augustine (film), a 2012 French film by Alice Winocour
- "Augustine", a song by Patrick Wolf from The Magic Position
- Augustine Band of Cahuilla Indians
- Augustinians, Catholic monastic order
- Enchiridion of Augustine
- Luhring Augustine Gallery, an art gallery in Chelsea, New York
- Musée des Augustins, a fine arts museum in Toulouse, France
- Ulmus americana 'Augustine', a species of American Elm tree

== See also ==
- Augustin (disambiguation)
- Augustino (disambiguation)
- Agostino (disambiguation)
- Agostinho (disambiguation)
- Agustin, a given name and surname
- Albert Augustine Ltd., originator of and currently a manufacturer of nylon classical guitar strings
- Augie (disambiguation)
- Augustine Commission (disambiguation)
- Augustinian (disambiguation)
- Augustinus (disambiguation)
- Saint-Augustin (disambiguation)
- Saint Augustine (disambiguation)
