= Agustina =

- Gender: female

Other names
- See also: Augustin

Agustina is a given name, a feminine version of Augustine. It is a name popular in Argentina, Indonesia, and Uruguay. It may refer to:

- Agustina de Aragón (1786–1857), Spanish heroine
- Agustina Bantiloc (born 1968), Filipino para-archer
- Agustina Bessa-Luís (1922–2019), Portuguese writer
- Agustina Cherri (born 1983), Argentine actress, dancer and model
- Agustina García (born 1981), field hockey player
- Agustina González López (1891-1936), writer and artist from the Generation of '27
- Agustina Palacio de Libarona (1825–1880), Argentine writer, storyteller, heroine
- Agustina Roth (born 2001), BMX rider

== See also ==
- Agustin
- Agustini
- Agustino
- Augustin
- Augustina
- Augustine
- Augustini
- Augustino
- Agustinia
