= Agustini =

Agustini is a surname. Notable people with the surname include:

- Delmira Agustini (1886–1914), Uruguayan poet
- Luis de Agustini (born 1976), naturalized Libyan football goalkeeper

== See also ==
- Agustin
- Agustina (disambiguation)
- Agustino
- Augustin (disambiguation)
- Augustina
- Augustine
- Augustini
- Augustino (given name)
- Megachile agustini
