= Augustin =

Augustin may refer to:

- Augustin (name), male name, variant of Augustine
- Augustin percussion musket M1842, was an Austrian/German tube lock system
- Augustin (typography), English or 14-point type
- Augustin, Brașov, a commune in Brașov County, Romania
- Dacian fortress of Augustin, ruined Dacian fortified town in modern Romania
- Palace of Augustin, a palace in Vitoria, Spain

== Film ==
- Augustin (film), a 1995 French film
- Augustin, King of Kung-Fu, 1999 French movie

== Music ==
- O du lieber Augustin ("Oh, you dear Augustin"), a popular Viennese song
- "Augustin" (song), Sweden's 1959 Eurovision Song Contest entry

== See also ==
- Augustine (disambiguation)
- Agustin
