= Augustina =

- Gender: Female

Other names
- See also: Agustin, Agustina, Agustini, Agustino, Augustin, Augustine, Augustini, Augustino

Augustina is a female given name, a recent coinage of Augustus. Notable people with the name include:

- Augustina (daughter of Heraclius), Byzantine princess
- Augustina López (1842–1932), Mexican actress
- Augustina Nkem Nwaokolo (born 1992), Nigerian weightlifter
- Augustina Stridsberg, Soviet spy
- Augustina Ebhomien Sunday (born 1996), Nigerian badminton player
- Enriqueta Augustina Rylands (1843–1908), founder of the John Rylands Library

== Other uses ==
- Augustina (grape), another name for the Italian wine grape Prié blanc

== See also ==
- Agustin
- Agustina
- Agustini
- Agustino
- Augustin
- Augustine
- Augustini
- Augustino
