= Augustian =

Augustian may refer to:

- Related to Caesar Augustus or his era
- Augustan (disambiguation)
- A misnomer for Augustinian religious orders associated with Saint Augustine
