= Augustin (name) =

- Pronunciation: French: [oɡystɛ̃] Romanian: [awɡusˈtin]

Origin
- Region of origin: France, Germany, Austria, Romania

Other names
- Variant form: Augustín
- Related names: Augustine, Augustus, Austin, August, Augusto, Sebastian

Augustin is a name, a variant of Augustine used in several languages, and may refer to:

== People ==
=== Surname ===
Notable persons with the surname of Augustin include:

- Aboobakar Augustin (born 1985), Mauritian footballer
- Anja Augustin (born 1974), German soprano
- Anneliese Augustin (1930–2021), German politician
- Basilio Augustín (1840–1910), Spanish Governor General of the Philippines
- Celestin Augustin (born 1971), Madagascan Olympic boxer
- D. J. Augustin (born 1987), American basketball player
- Eduard Augustin (born 1942), East German canoer
- Fernando Augustin (born 1980), Mauritian sprinter
- Ionel Augustin (born 1955), Romanian footballer
- Jean-Baptiste Jacques Augustin (1759–1832), French painter
- Jean-Kévin Augustin (born 1997), French professional football player
- Jean-Marc Augustin (born 1965), French boxer
- Jeremias Augustin (born 1985), Swedish ice hockey player
- Johan Samuel Augustin (1715–1785), German-Danish astronomical writer and civil servant
- Josef Augustin (1942–2022), Czech chess master
- Kristy Augustin (born 1979), German politician
- Larry Augustin, CEO of SugarCRM and venture capitalist
- Liane Augustin (1927–1978), German/Austrian singer and actress
- Ludovic Augustin (1902–?), Haitian Olympic sport shooter
- Marx Augustin (1643–1685), Austrian minstrel, bagpiper and poet
- Mary Ann Augustin (born 1954), Australian food chemist and dairy scientist
- Patrice Augustin (born 1955), French former footballer
- Radoslav Augustín (born 1987), Slovak footballer
- Virginie Augustin (born 1973), French comic book artist

See also

- Govert-Marinus Augustijn (1871–1963), Dutch potter
- Jonathan Joseph-Augustin (born 1981), French footballer
- Katrin Wagner-Augustin (born 1977), German canoer

=== Given name ===
Notable persons with the given name of Augustin include:

- Augustin Ahimana, Rwandan Anglican bishop
- Augustin Andriamananoro (born 1968), Madagascar politician
- Augustin Aubert (1781–1857), French painter
- Augustin Augier (1758–1825), French schoolteacher, a Catholic priest, and botanist
- Augustin Banyaga (born 1947), Rwandan-born American mathematician
- Augustin Barié (1883–1915), French composer and organist
- Augustin Botescu, Romanian football manager
- Augustin Buzura (1938–2017), Romanian novelist and short story writer
- Augustin Cabanès (1862–1928), French doctor, historian and author
- Augustin Călin (footballer) (born 1973), Romanian footballer
- Augustin Călin (football manager) (born 1980), Romanian football manager
- Antoine Augustin Calmet (1672–1757), French Benedictine monk
- Augustin-Louis Cauchy (1789–1857), French mathematician, engineer, and physicist
- Augustin Daly (1838–1899), American playwright
- Augustin Alexandre Darthé (1769–1797), French revolutionary
- Augustin Deleanu (1944–2014), Romanian footballer
- Augustin Pyramus de Candolle (1778–1841), Swiss botanist
- Augustin Joseph Dugas (known as Gus Dugas, 1907–1997), Canadian-born professional baseball player
- Augustin Dumay (born 1949), French violinist and conductor
- Augustin Eduard (born 1962), Romanian professional footballer
- Augustin Ehrensvärd (1710–1772), Swedish military officer, military architect, and artist
- Augustin Ehrensvärd (1887–1968), Swedish nobleman and civil servant
- Augustin Farah (1910–1983), archbishop in Tripoli
- Augustin-Jean Fresnel (1788–1827), French civil engineer and physicist
- Augustin Gallant (1916–1994), Canadian educator, lawyer, and political figure on Prince Edward Island
- Augustin Hacquard (1860–1901), French missionary
- Augustin Hadelich (born 1984), Italian-German-American violinist
- Augustín Hambálek (born 1957), Slovak politician
- Augustín Marián Húska (1929–2016), Slovak politician
- Augustin Iyamuremye (born 1946), Rwandan politician and academic
- Augustin Kambale, ranger in the Congo
- Augustin Landier (born 1974), French economist
- Augustin Langlade (1703 – c. 1771), French Canadian fur-trader who founded what became the city of Green Bay
- Augustin Lercheimer (pseudonym of Hermann Wilken, 1522–1603), German humanist and mathematician
- Augustin Lesage (1876–1954), French coal miner and painter
- Augustin Abel Hector Léveillé (1864–1918), French botanist and clergyman
- Augustin Maillefer (born 1993), Swiss rower
- Johan Augustin Mannerheim (1706–1778), Swedish artillery colonel and commandant
- Augustin Nadal (1659–1741), French author of plays
- Augustin Pacha (1870–1954), Romanian cleric
- Augustin Petrechei (born 1980), Romanian rugby union player
- Augustin Přeučil (1914–1947), Czech military pilot and spy
- Augustin Rabeasimbola (born 1988), Malagasy footballer
- Augustin Robespierre (1763–1794), French revolutionary and politician
- Augustin Royer (fl. 1679), French architect
- Augustin Sageret (1763–1851), French botanist
- Charles Augustin Sainte-Beuve (1804–1869), French literary critic
- Johann Martin Augustin Scholz (1794–1852), German Roman Catholic orientalist, biblical scholar, and academic theologian
- Augustin Theiner (1804–1874), German theologian and historian
- Augustin Viard (born 1984), French musician

== See also ==
- Augustine (given name)
  - List of people with given name Augustine
- Augustine (surname)
- Agustín, given name and surname
