= Jean-Baptiste Paulin Guérin =

French painter (1783–1855)

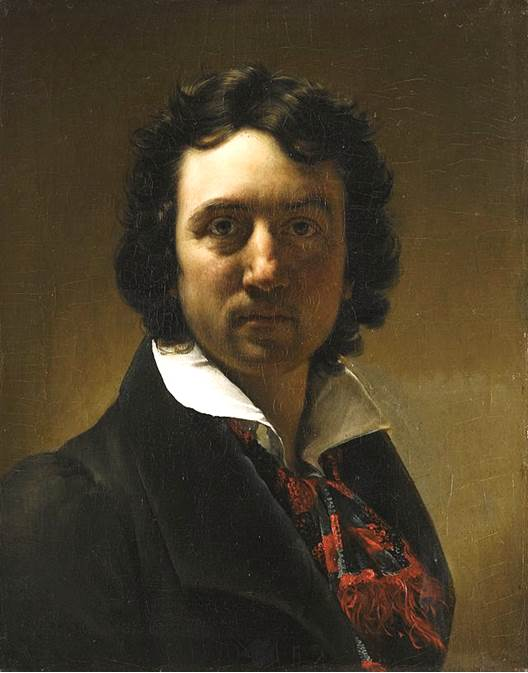
Self-portrait (c. 1817)

Jean-Baptiste Paulin Guérin (French: [ʒɑ̃ batist pɔlɛ̃ ɡeʁɛ̃]; 25 March 1783 – 19 January 1855) was a French painter who specialised in portrait painting.

== Biography ==
He was born into a working-class family that moved to Marseille when his father acquired a locksmithing business there in 1794. During his apprenticeship in that trade, he also studied drawing at a local school and displayed some talent for it. Soon, he was spending all of his free time painting. During this time he befriended another aspiring painter, Augustin Aubert, who he joined in Paris in 1802, financing the trip by selling works to a local Baron who was an amateur art enthusiast. After that point, he devoted himself exclusively to painting.

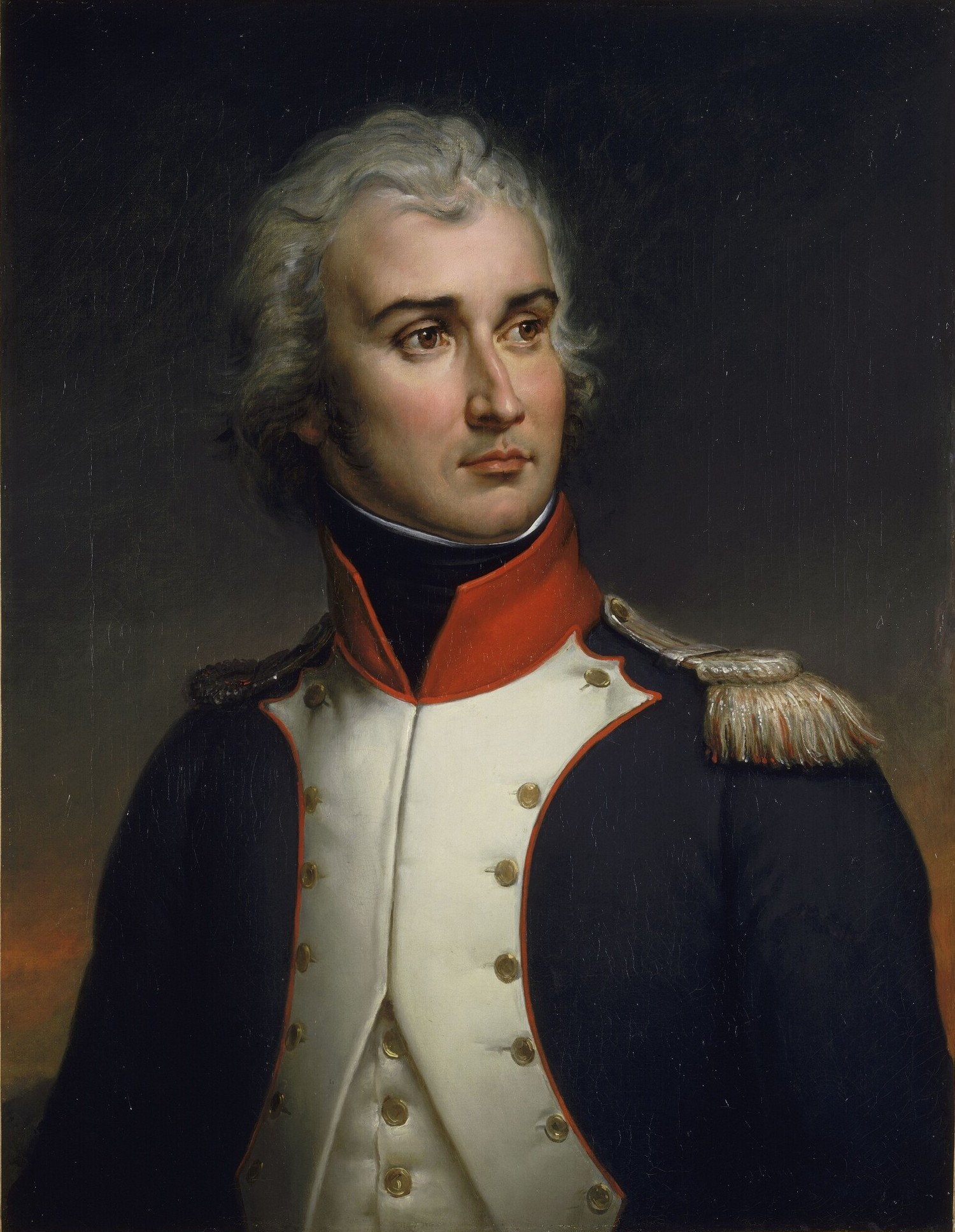
Portrait of Jean Lannes (1835)

For a short time, he was employed as an assistant to François Gérard while serving as an unpaid apprentice in the studios of François-André Vincent. In Gérard's studio, he prepared the canvases by painting clothing, drapery and miscellaneous items. Most of his earnings were sent home to help support his family. After a time, he became bored with such tedious work and, in 1810, submitted some of his paintings to the Salon where they were generally well received.

Vivant Denon asked him to help decorate the ceiling at the Tuileries Palace, but the project was never finished due to the Bourbon Restoration. After that, he helped to renovate the Palace of Versailles and restore the paintings there. In 1817, he won a gold medal for "Jésus mort et la Mère des douleurs" (Jesus who Died and the Mother of Sorrows), created for the Baltimore Basilica, the oldest major Catholic structure in the United States.

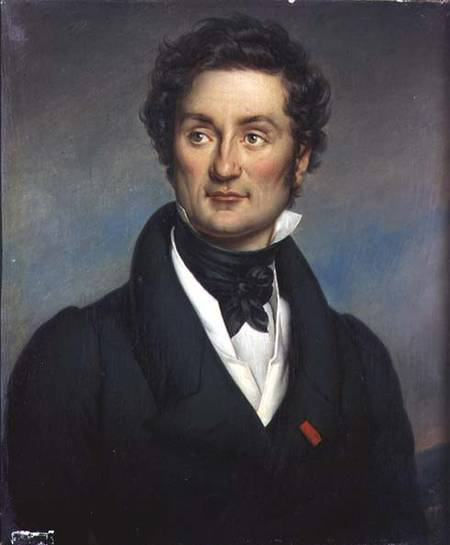
Portrait of Charles Nodier (1844)

In 1822 his tableau "Anchise et Vénus" attracted the attention of King Louis XVIII, which earned him the Légion d'honneur and, two years later, the honor of painting the King's portrait. In 1828, he was appointed the Director of drawing and painting at the Maison d'éducation de la Légion d'honneur. He also gave private lessons. During the reign of King Louis Philippe, he continued to receive numerous public commissions.

A few months after his death, a major exhibition of his paintings was given at the Exposition Universelle (1855). Some of his works have been mistakenly attributed to Pierre-Narcisse Guérin or Jean-Urbain Guérin, and vice versa. Neither of them were related to him.
