= François Pierre Barry =

French painter (1813–1905)

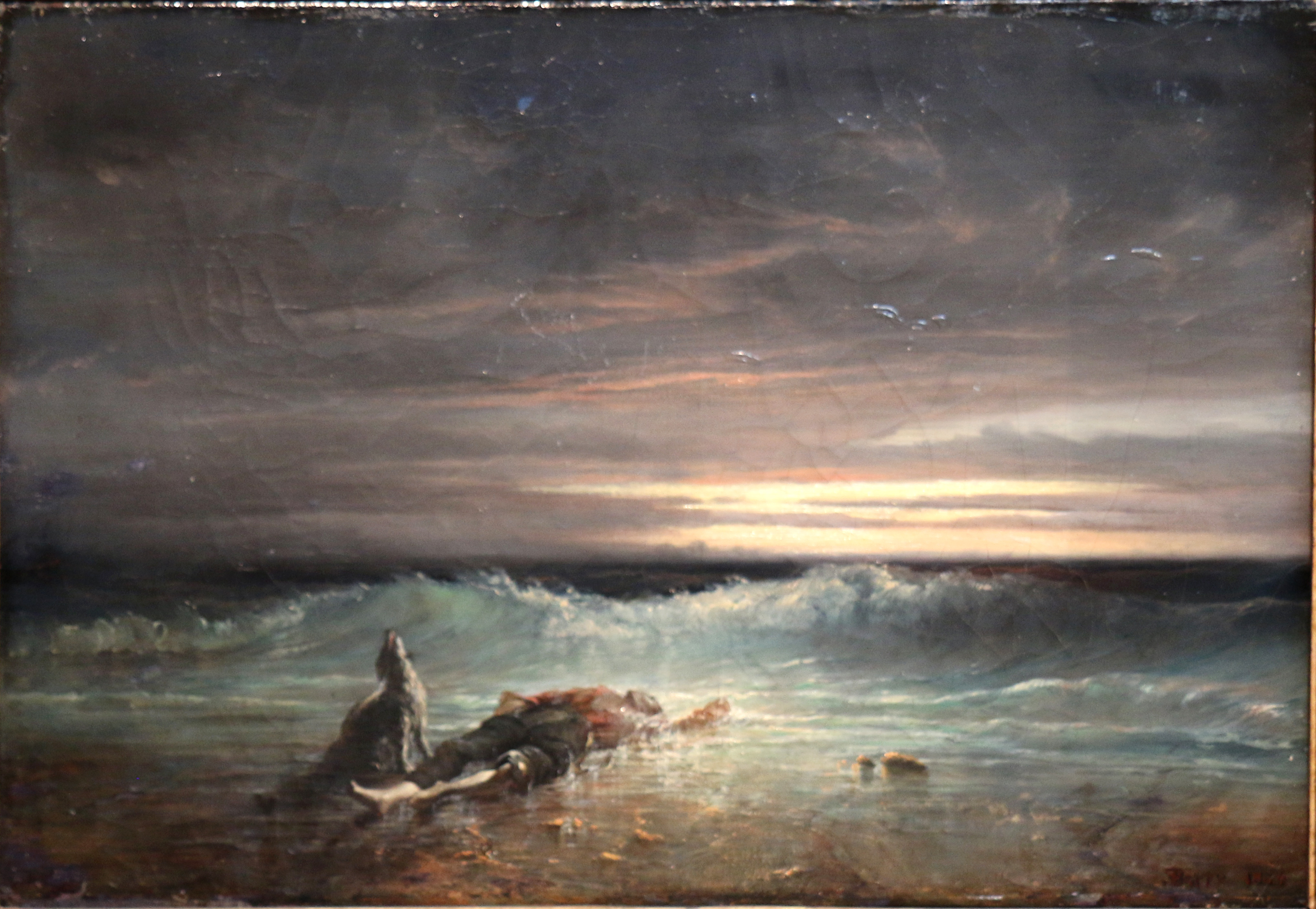
After the Shipwreck

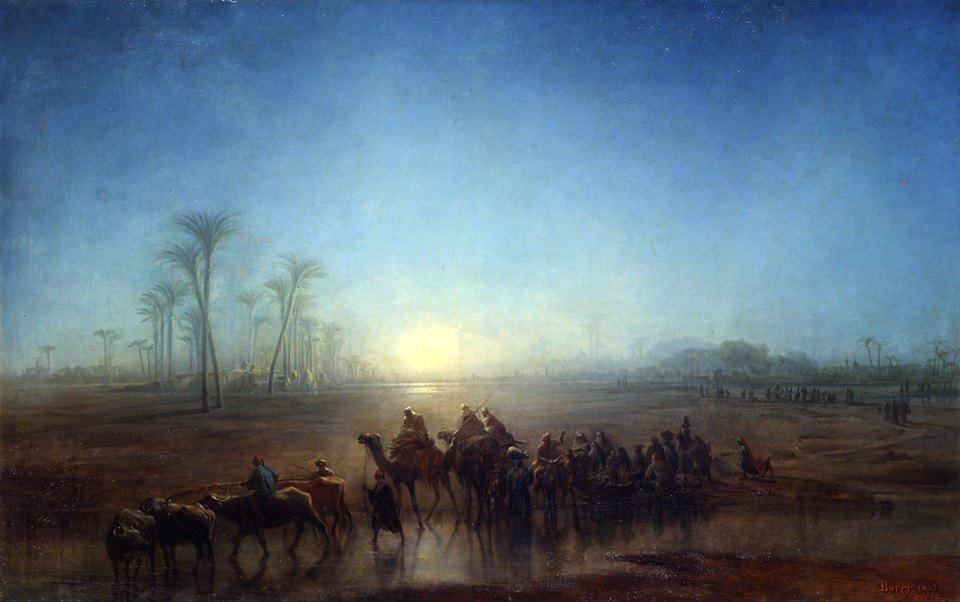
Egyptian Caravan, Dahesh Museum of Art

François-Pierre-Bernard Barry (13 May 1813, Marseille – 3 September 1905, Saint-Laurent-du-Var) was a French painter who specialized in maritime scenes.

== Biography ==
He was born to a family of modest means. After completing his primary studies, he worked as a hairdresser for several years, while drawing and painting as a hobby. He eventually decided to enter the École supérieure d'art et de design Marseille-Méditerranée, under the direction of Augustin Aubert. In 1840, at the age of twenty-seven, he moved to Paris and became a student of Théodore Gudin, the noted marine painter.

His origins in Marseille led to him to prefer maritime and nautical scenes, which came naturally to him. Two of his scenes were awarded third-class medals at the Salon, the very same year he first arrived in Paris.

In 1853, he was elected a member of the Académie de Marseille. In 1862, he made an extended trip to Egypt to examine the works at the Suez Canal; travelling in the entourage of Prince Napoléon Bonaparte, Ferdinand de Lesseps and Jules Charles-Roux. He executed several paintings that provide an invaluable record of the canal and life in its vicinity. He made another trip to Egypt in 1865, this time visiting Alexandria, where he mingled with traders from Marseille.

After his retirement to Saint-Laurent-du-Var, he continued to paint landscapes of Provence. In 1882, he was named a Chevalier in the Legion of Honor. After a long period of inactivity, he died at his home, aged ninety-two.

His works may be seen throughout France and at the Dahesh Museum of Art in New York.
