= Perie =

Perie is a surname. Notable people with the surname include:

- Augustine Périé (1832–1892), French Catholic missionary
- Bianca Perie (born 1990), Romanian hammer thrower
- Hugo Perié (1944–2011), Argentine politician
- John Perie (1831–1874), Scottish soldier and Victoria Cross recipient

== See also ==
- Perry (surname)
