= List of people with given name Augustine =

This is a list of notable people with the given name Augustine.

- Augustine Albert (1791 – after 1846), French opera singer
- Augustine Baines (1786/87–1843), English religious figure
- Herbert Augustine Carter (1874–1916), English recipient of the Victoria Cross
- Augustine Chacon (1861–1902), Mexican outlaw
- Timothy Augustine Coghlan (1856–1926), Australian statistician
- Augustine De Rothmaler (1859-1942, Belgian pedagogue and feminist
- Joseph Augustine Di Noia (born 1943), American Roman Catholic archbishop and theologian
- Augustine Joseph Hickey Duganne (1823–1884), American poet
- William Augustine Duncan (1811–1885), Scottish journalist and colonial official
- Augustine Eguavoen (born 1965), Nigerian footballer
- Augustine FitzGerald (c. 1765–1834), Irish politician
- Demetrius Augustine Gallitzin (1770–1840), Russian-American aristocrat and Catholic priest
- Augustine Garland (1603–unknown), English lawyer
- Augustine Hailwood (1875–1939), British baker and politician
- John Augustine Hartford (1872–1951), president of the Great Atlantic and Pacific Tea Company
- James Augustine Healy (1830–1900), American Catholic bishop, first African-American bishop
- Augustine Jibrin (born 1988), Nigerian footballer
- Augustine Ngom Jua (1924–1977), Cameroonian politician
- Augustine Kandathil (1874–1956), first Indian Archbishop and first Metropolitan of the Catholic St. Thomas Christians
- Augustine Kelly (1894–1960), Irish cricketer
- Martin Augustine Knapp (1843–1923), United States federal judge
- Augustine Lopez (1935–2013), Tohono Oʼodham Nation tribal chairman in Arizona, United States
- John Augustine Macdonald (1913–1961), Canadian politician
- Augustine Mbara (born 1991), Zimbabwean footballer
- James Augustine McFaul (1850–1917), Irish-American bishop
- Augustine Nshimye (died 2026), Ugandan judge and politician
- Augustine Ofuokwu (1944–2004), Nigerian footballer
- William Augustine Ogden (1841–1897), American composer
- Augustine Paul (1944–2010), Malaysian federal court judge
- Augustine Périé (1832–1892), French Catholic missionary
- Augustine Reding (1625–1692), Swiss Benedictine and theological writer
- Augustine Rubit (born1989), American basketball player
- Augustine Schoffler (1822–1851), French saint and martyr
- Augustine Scriven (1852–1916), Anglican priest
- Augustine C. Smith (1789–1843), American politician from Virginia
- Augustine Tawiah, Ghanaian politician
- Augustine Ukattah (1918–1996), Nigerian teacher and politician
- Augustine Vincent (c. 1584–1626), English herald and antiquary
- Augustine Warner Sr. (1611–1674), English-born Virginia planter and politician
- Augustine Washington (1694-1743), American planter and father of the first U.S. president, George Washington
- John Thornton Augustine Washington (1783–1841), American landowner, farmer, and statesman, member of the Washington family

== Fictional Characters ==
- Augustine St. Clare, a character in Uncle Tom's Cabin.
- Augustine Little, a character in Naomi Novik's Temeraire Series
- Augustine Sycamore, the Pokémon professor from Pokémon X and Y.

== See also ==
- Augustin (name), given name and surname
- Augustine (surname)
