= Museo de Bellas Artes de Álava =

Art museum in Vitoria-Gasteiz, Spain

Museum of Fine Arts of Álava
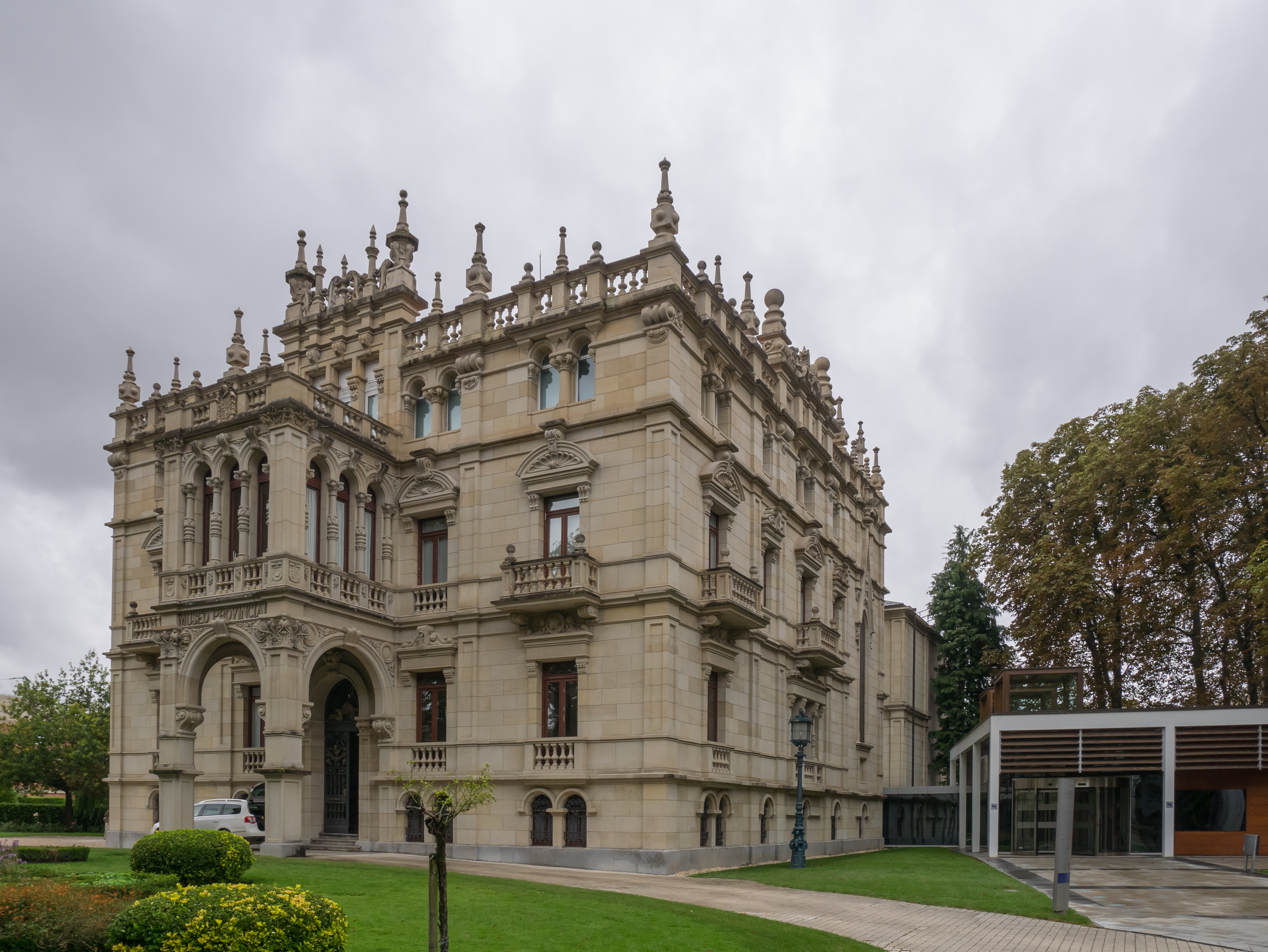
- View of the museum
- Established: 1942
- Location: Fray Francisco Street,8, Vitoria-Gasteiz
- Coordinates: 42°50′30″N 2°40′47″W
- Website: arteederrenmuseoa.eus

The Museum of Fine Arts of Álava (Spanish: Museo de Bellas Artes de Álava, Basque: Arabako Arte Ederren Museoa) is located in Vitoria-Gasteiz, the capital of the Basque Country, Spain. The museum is dedicated to Spanish art from the 18th to the 20th century, and particularly to Basque art from the 1850–1950 period. Opened in 1942, it is located at the Augustin Zulueta Palace.

== History ==
=== Augustin Zulueta Palace ===
In 1912, Elvira Zulueta and Ricardo Augustin started the construction of their private residence in the street Fray Francisco; what today is known as the Augustin Zulueta Palace. Elvira, daughter of Julián de Zulueta, belonged to a wealthy family from Vitoria, and after her marriage in 1905 with Ricardo Augustin, they decided to build a mansion in Vitoria's wealthy neighborhood.

The management of the project was entrusted to the architects Julián de Apraiz (1876–1962) and Francisco Javier de Luque (1871–1941), who had won the competition for designing Vitoria's new cathedral in 1906.

The work, which was very complex for that time, was completed in 1916. However, in September 1917, Elvira died suddenly and Ricardo Augustin gradually abandoned the city, leaving the palace empty for much of the year. He lived intermittently in the palace until 1930, when he definitively moved to Madrid. He sold the palace to the Foral Deputation of Álava in 1941, after the conclusion of the Spanish Civil War.

=== The museum and its collections ===
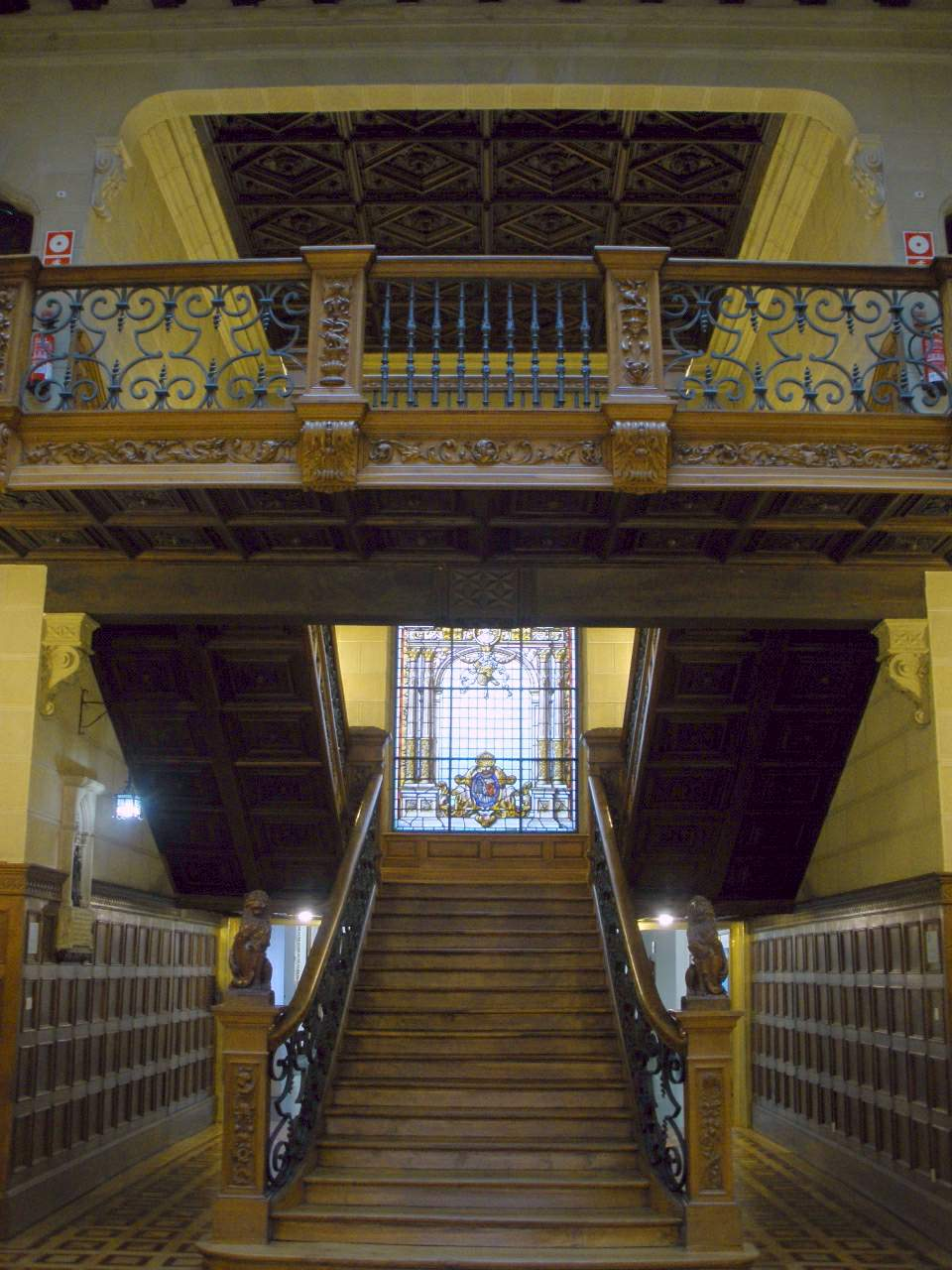
Main staircase

The idea of creating a museum in Álava dated back over a century. In 1792 the Royal Basque Society kept a library and a collection of Roman tombstones in the old Seminary Church of Aguirre de Vitoria. In 1844 the civil governor established a "Gallery of Pictures" in a room of the Palace House. At the end of the 19th century, Federico Baraibar had gathered archaeological remains in what he called the "Incipient Museum" in the halls of the secondary school, which later served as the meeting place of the Basque Parliament. In addition, a school of Arts and crafts hosted rooms with works, primarily from local artists.

For years, the local press had urged the creation of a museum, and this is reflected in 1940 with the creation of the Culture Council of Álava, one of whose main objectives was the establishment and operation of the museum, library and provincial archive. The first step was taken in 1941 with the purchase of the Augustin Zulueta Palace, destined to accommodate, under the name of Casa de Álava, both collections related to fine arts and archaeology as well as the library and the archive of the province. The Diocese of Vitoria donated religious art. Other donations came from the Museo del Prado and private individuals. The museum opened in 1942.

In 1975, the museum began a systematic process of collecting contemporary art, which later became one of the most complete in Spain. From 1978 to 1980, the collection of Basque art was moved to the nearby Ajuria Enea palace. When Ajuria Enea became the official residence of the Lehendakari, the collection was returned to the provincial museum. In 1984 the Foral Deputation acquired a playing card collection from Félix Alfaro Fournier (1895–1989). The playing card collection was later moved to a standalone museum, the Fournier Museum of Playing Cards.

The museum closed for renovations in 1999. Religious art was moved to the new Diocesan Museum of Sacred Art of Álava, while contemporary art was moved to Artium. Nowadays, the museum consists of three sections: the original palace, an expansion from the 1960s and an annex where the visitor entrance is located.

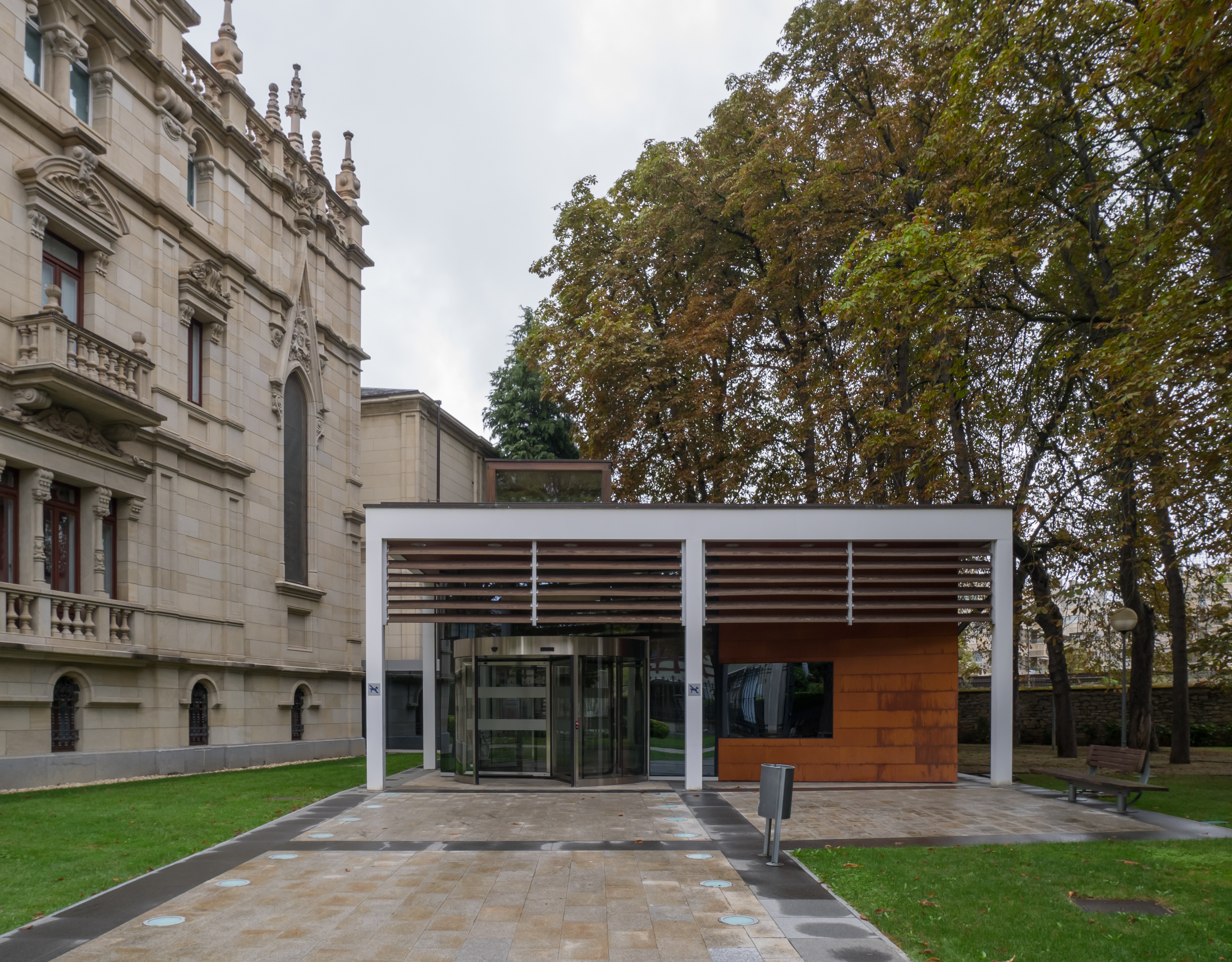
View of the 2001 additions, with the new entrance

=== Current collection ===
The tour begins in the rooms of the ground floor dedicated to Basque art from 1850 to 1950, where you can see the evolution of the painting on the basis of pioneering artists such as Juan Angel Sáez (1811–1873), Antonio Lecuona, Eduardo Zamacois y Zabala and Jose Etxenagusia, among others. The display continues with the works of innovative artists such as Adolfo Guiard, Darío de Regoyos and Juan de Echevarría, to the most outstanding artists of the period prior to the outbreak of the civil war, such as Julián de Tellaeche (1884–1957).

Also on the first floor, one may find other works by Basque artists; large format works by Ignacio Zuloaga, Aurelio Arteta, Elías Salaverria, Francisco Iturrino and the brothers Ramón and Valentín de Zubiaurre, works in which the traditional artistic languages meet with the most modern.

The second floor is dedicated to Fernando de Amárica, with works donated by his foundation for permanent display. The chronological journey allows you to follow the succession of stylistic trends used throughout his long career (realism, impressionism, expressionism).

Located in the zone corresponding to the Augustin Zulueta Palace, the collection of Spanish art from the 18th to the 20th century, shown through portraits, landscapes and scenes depicting local customs, illustrates the transition from classical and academic painting to more spontaneous romantic styles and painters from the realist movement. The portraits of Vicente López Portaña and Federico and Raimundo de Madrazo, the landscapes of Carlos de Haes, Aureliano de Beruete and the mural sketches of Josep Maria Sert are a good example of this.
