= Augustine (surname) =

Augustine is a surname. Notable people with the name include:

- Alan Augustine (died 2001), American politician
- Alex Augustine (born 1956), Réunion international footballer and football administrator
- Ann Augustine (born 1988), Indian film actress
- Anthony Augustine (born 1980), Grenadian international footballer
- Brendan Augustine (born 1971), South African international footballer
- Chike Augustine (born 1992), Trinidad and Tobago basketball player
- Dave Augustine (born 1949), American baseball outfielder
- David Augustine Jr. or Dee-1, American rapper
- Deric Augustine (born 1990), American actor and novelist
- Erika F. Augustine, American pediatric neurologist
- James Augustine (born 1984), American basketball player
- Jean Augustine, (born 1937), Canadian politician
- Jerry Augustine (born 1952), American baseball pitcher
- Joe Mike Augustine (1911–1995), First Nations leader and historian of the Metepenagiag Mi'kmaq Nation, grandfather of Noah Augustine
- Kathy Augustine (1956–2006), first female state controller of Nevada
- Michael Augustine (disambiguation), several people
- Noah Augustine (1971–2010), Canadian First Nations activist, grandson of Joe Mike Augustine
- Norman R. Augustine (born 1935), American aviation engineer/businessman
- Parnelia Augustine (1884–1960), American painter
- Roshy Augustine (born 1969), Indian politician
- Steve Augustine (born 1977), British Virgin Islands Olympic athlete
- Steve Augustine (musician), Canadian rock drummer, member of Thousand Foot Krutch
- Trey Augustine (born 2005), American ice hockey player

== See also ==
- Kif Augustine-Adams (born 1964), professor of law at Brigham Young University's law school
- Augustin (name), given name and surname
- Augustine (given name)
