= Augustan =

Augustan is an adjective which means pertaining to Augustus or Augusta. It can refer to:

- Augustan Age (disambiguation)
- Augustan literature (ancient Rome)
- Augustan prose
- Augustan poetry
- Augustan Reprint Society
- Augustan literature
- Augustan History
- Augustan drama
- A current or former resident of Augusta, Georgia

See also

- Legio I Augusta or First Augustan Legion
- Legio II Augusta or Second Augustan Legion
- Legio III Augusta or Third Augustan Legion
- Gemma Augustea or Augustan jewel
- Arch of Augustus (disambiguation) or Augustan Arch
- Closed couplet or Augustan couplet
- Heroic couplet or Augustan heroic couplet
- Ara Pacis or Altar of Augustan Peace
- Augsburg Confession or Augustan Confession
