= Augie (disambiguation) =

Augie is a masculine nickname.

Augie may also refer to:

- Amina Augie (born 1953), Nigerian justice of the Supreme Court of Nigeria
- Augie, Nigeria, a Local Government Area
- Augie Award, an honor granted by the Culinary Institute of America
- "Auggies", a nickname for the sports teams of Augsburg University, Minneapolis, Minnesota, a private liberal arts college
- Augustana College (South Dakota), a liberal arts college referred to casually as "Augie"
- Augie's Jazz Bar, former name of Smoke (jazz club), a music venue in New York City
