= Ormeniș =

Ormeniș Ürmös
- Commune
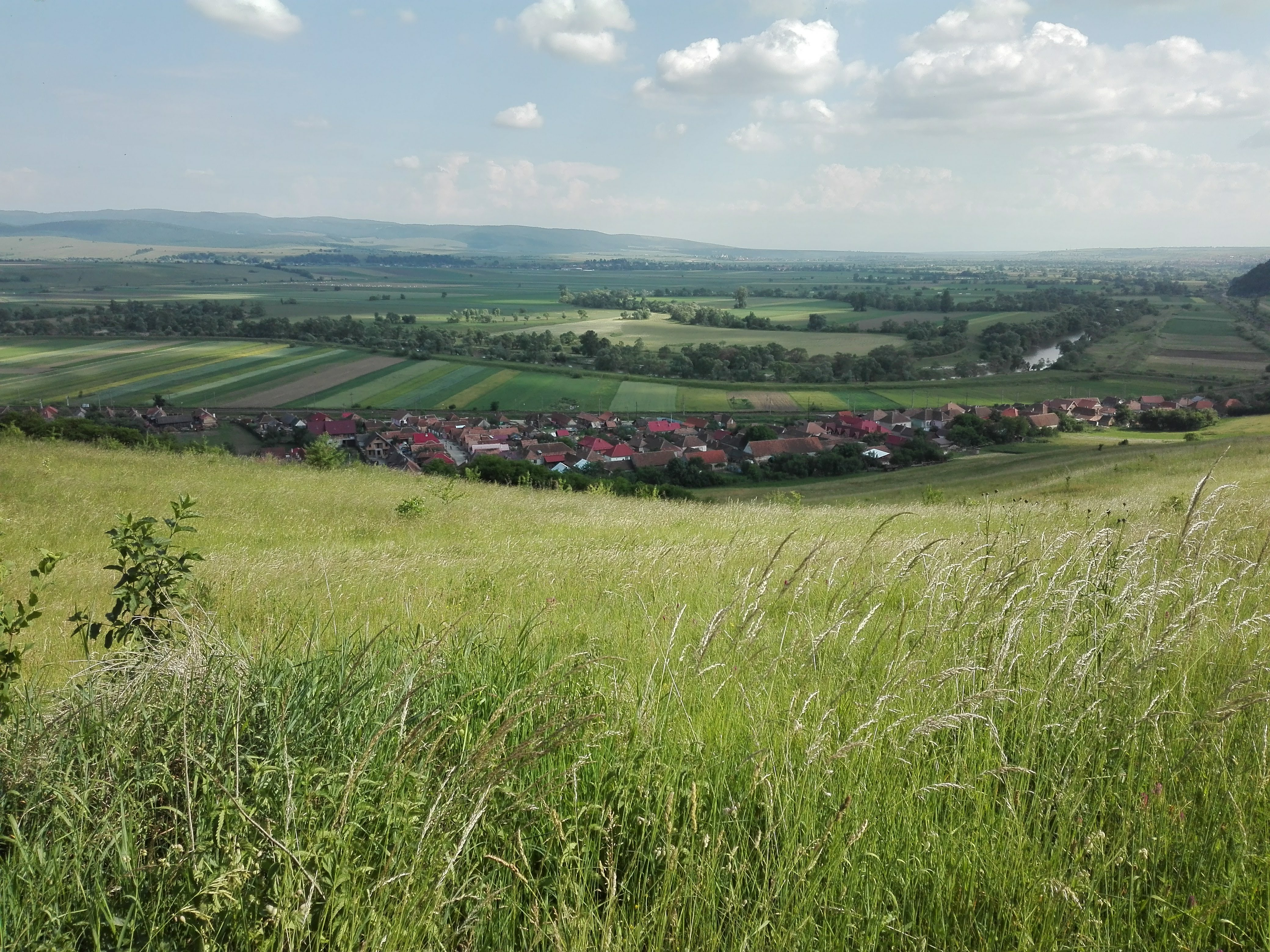
- Ormeniș

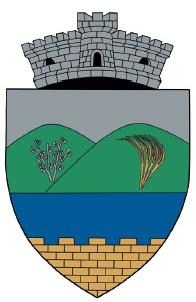
- Coat of arms

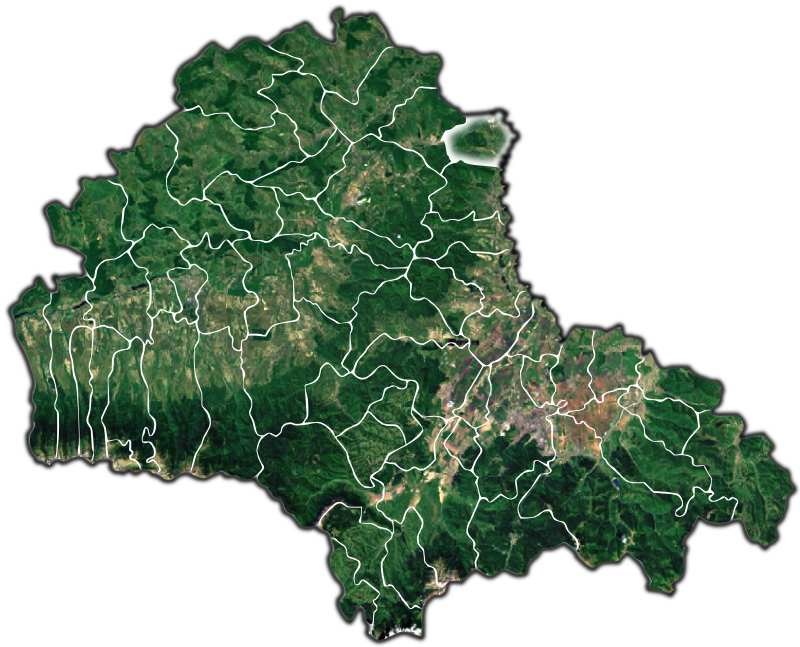
- Location within the county

- Location in Romania
- Coordinates: 46.0167°N 25.55°E
- Country: Romania
- County: Brașov

Government
  - Mayor (2020–2024): Barna-Alpár Gyerő (PNL)
- Area: 47.97 km^{2} (18.52 sq mi)
- Elevation: 426 m (1,398 ft)
- Population (2021-12-01): 2,045
  - Density: 42.63/km^{2} (110.4/sq mi)
- Time zone: UTC+02:00 (EET)
  - Summer (DST): UTC+03:00 (EEST)
- Postal code: 507150
- Area code: (+40) 02 68
- Vehicle reg.: BV
- Website: www.primariaormenis.ro

Ormeniș (German: Ermesch; Hungarian: Ürmös) is a commune in Brașov County, Transylvania, Romania. It is composed of a single village, Ormeniș. It also included the village of Augustin until 2005, when that village was split off to form a separate commune.

The commune is located in the northeastern part of the county, 45 km (28 mi) north of the county seat, Brașov. It sits on the left bank of the Olt River, which forms the border with Covasna County to the east and the north. It neighbors Apața commune to the south and Racoș commune to the west.

The Ormeniș train station serves Line 300 of the CFR network, which connects Bucharest with the Hungarian border near Oradea.

Historical population
Year	Pop.	±%
1850	927	—
1977	2,041	+120.2%
2002	1,926	−5.6%
2011	1,976	+2.6%
2021	2,045	+3.5%
Source: Census data

At the 2011 census, the commune had 1,976 inhabitants, of which 43.3% were Romani, 39.3% Hungarians, and 17.3% Romanians. At the 2021 census, Ormeniș had a population of 2,045; of those, 49.39% were Roma, 29.29% Hungarians, and 17.65% Romanians.
