= Augie =

Augie (sometimes spelled Auggie) is a nickname for variations of the name Augustus, which is derived from Latin. It may refer to:

== People ==
- Augie Auer (1940–2007), meteorologist
- Augie Bergamo (1917–1974), Major League Baseball player
- Augie Blunt (1929–1999), actor
- Augie Donatelli (1914–1990), Major League Baseball umpire
- Augie Galan (1912–1993), Major League Baseball player
- Augie Garrido (born 1939), college baseball coach
- Augie Ge, American professional pickleball player
- Augie Hiebert (1916–2007), Alaskan television pioneer
- Augie Hoffmann (born 1981), American football player
- Augie Johns (1899–1975), Major League Baseball player
- Augie Lio (1918–1989), American football player
- Augie Lohman (1911–1989), American special effects artist
- Augie Meyers (born 1940), musician
- Augie Nieto (born 1958), fitness executive
- Augie Ojeda (born 1974), Major League Baseball player
- Jacob Orgen (1893–1927), New York gangster nicknamed "Little Augie"
- Augie Prudhomme (1902–1992), Major League Baseball player
- Augie Rios, a musician best known for the song "¿Dónde Está Santa Claus?"
- Augie Rodriguez, musician
- Augie Sanchez (born 1977), featherweight boxer
- Augie Schmidt (born 1961), college baseball coach
- Auggie Smith (born 1970), American comedian
- Augie Swentor (1899–1969), Major League Baseball player
- Augie T. (born 1968), Filipino comedian
- Auggie Vidovich II (born 1981), American NASCAR driver
- Augie Visocchi, a musician best known for his work with the rock band The Hard Lessons
- Augie Walsh (1904–1985), Major League Baseball player
- Augie Wolf (born 1961), American shot putter

== Fictional characters ==
- Augie Doggie, an anthropomorphic dog from The Quick Draw McGraw Show
- Augie, in the 1995 film Smoke, modeled after the owner of Augie's Jazz Bar
- Augie March, the protagonist of Saul Bellow's book The Adventures of Augie March
- Augie, a secondary character in the 2013 film Blue Jasmine
- Auggie Doggie, a nickname for the main character in the YA book Wonder (Palacio novel)
- Dr. Augustina "Auggie" Salazar, a main character in the 2024 Netflix television series 3 Body Problem
