= Ulmus americana 'Columnaris' =

Elm cultivar

- 'Columnaris' 60 ft (18 m) tall and a spread of 18 ft (5.5 m) (circa 1951).
- Species: Ulmus americana
- Cultivar: 'Columnaris'
- Origin: Conesus Lake, New York, US

The American elm cultivar Ulmus americana 'Columnaris' was propagated by R. E. Horsey of the Rochester N.Y. Parks Department from a tree found by Mr John Dunbar at Conesus Lake, New York, in 1911, and originally described as a forma, Ulmus americana L. f. columnaris, f. nov. Rehder (1922). It was the earliest of a number of compact, columnar American elm cultivars, to be followed by 'Ascendens' and 'Augustine Ascendening'.

== Description ==
As implied by its name, the tree has a fastigiate, columnar form, of almost equal width from the base to a top which is rather flat in appearance. "The leaves differ from those of the common form," wrote Rehder (1922), "in being rather broad, measuring up to 7.5 cm. in width, very sharply and deeply doubly serrate, scabrous above, pilose on the veins and veinlets beneath and very unequal at the base; the petioles are very short, not exceeding 3 mm. in length; the young branchlets are pubescent."

== Pests and diseases ==
No specific information available, but the species as a whole is highly susceptible to Dutch elm disease and elm yellows; it is also moderately preferred for feeding and reproduction by the adult elm leaf beetle Xanthogaleruca luteola, and highly preferred for feeding by the Japanese beetle Popillia japonica in the United States. U. americana is also the most susceptible of all the elms to verticillium wilt.

== Cultivation ==
'A specimen of 'Columnaris' was present in Arnold Arboretum. The tree is not known to have been cultivated beyond the United States, and is no longer in commerce.

== Accessions ==
North America

- Morton Arboretum, Illinois, US. Specimen in the Columnar Tree Section reputed to be "in good health" in the autumn of 2006. Acc. no. 1041–41, (graft).
