= Ulmus americana 'Ascendens' =

Elm cultivar

- Species: Ulmus americana
- Cultivar: 'Ascendens'
- Origin: Seneca Park, Rochester, New York

The American elm cultivar Ulmus americana 'Ascendens', 'Upright American elm', was cloned c.1910 by Bernard H. Slavin, Superintendent of Parks, Rochester, New York, from a tree growing in Seneca Park, Rochester, and named in 1927 for its narrow oval form.

See also the similar cultivars 'Columnaris' and 'Augustine Ascending'. It is not known why such a promising clone as 'Ascendens' appears rare in cultivation, but 'Augustine Ascending' was released at about the same date. Neither Green nor Santamour suggested that they were synonyms.

== Description ==
The tree has small, fastigiate lateral branches forming a narrow, oval head. Its leaves are similar in shape and texture to those of the parent species, but slightly smaller. Arnold Arboretum, however, report leaves 3 to 6 in. long and 2 to 4 in. wide. The bark remains smooth for longer than usual in the species and its fissures are less deep, while the trunk lacks the marked buttressing of the species.

== Pests and diseases ==
The clone's resistance to Dutch elm disease is not known, but the species is highly susceptible to the disease and elm yellows; it is also moderately preferred for feeding and reproduction by the adult elm leaf beetle Xanthogaleruca luteola, and highly preferred for feeding by the Japanese beetle Popillia japonica in the United States. U. americana is also the most susceptible of all the elms to verticillium wilt.

== Cultivation ==
In an article on the cultivar, Trees Magazine (Sept.-Oct. 1941), observing of American elm that there were "too many city streets where sidewalks are upheaved by its heavily buttressed trunk, lawns impaired by its massed tops, and roofs overhung by upper branches brushing the gables of homes," described 'Ascendens' as, by contrast, "an ideal variety for the narrow streets of our cities and for small-area planting". The tree was much planted in the Rochester area. It was described as hardy and less prone to wind-damage than broader forms. The tree is not known to have been cultivated beyond the US.

== Accessions ==
=== North America ===
Arnold Arboretum, US. Acc. no. 140-61.
