= Agustín =

- Gender: Masculine
- Language: Spanish

Other gender
- Feminine: Agustina

Other names
- Nickname: Agus
- Derived: Augustine, augustus
- Related names: Augustin, Augustino

Agustín is a Spanish given name and sometimes a surname. It is related to Augustín.

Notable people with the name include:

== Given name ==
- Agustín Adorni (born 1990), Argentine footballer
- Agustín Allione (born 1994), Argentine footballer
- Agustín Almendra (born 2000), Argentine footballer
- Agustín Auzmendi (born 1997), Argentine footballer
- Agustín Bouzat (born 1994), Argentine footballer
- Agustín Calleri (born 1976), Argentine tennis player
- Agustín Canapino (born 1990), Argentine racing driver
- Agustín Cañete (1844–1902), Paraguayan politician and military officer
- Agustín Cárdenas (1927–2001), Afro-Cuban sculptor
- Agustín Cejas (1945–2015), Argentine footballer
- Agustín de Iturbide (1783–1824), First Emperor of Mexico
- Agustín de Rojas Villandrando (1572–1618), Spanish writer and actor
- Agustín Destribats (born 1997), Argentine freestyle wrestler
- Agustín Díaz (born 1988), Argentine footballer
- Agustín Escobar (died 2025), Spanish business executive
- Agustín Fiorilli (born 1978), Argentine swimmer
- Agustín Fontana (born 1996), Argentine footballer
- Agustín Fraga (born 2002), Argentine rugby union player
- Agustín Gamarra (1785–1841), Peruvian soldier and politician
- Agustín Giay (born 2004), Argentine footballer
- Agustín Irusta (born 1942), Argentine retired footballer
- Agustín Jerónimo de Iturbide y Huarte (1807–1866), Prince Imperial of Mexico
- Agustin Jara (born 1992), Argentine footballer
- Agustín Pedro Justo (1876–1943), former President of Argentina
- Agustín Laje (born 1989), Argentine political scientist
- Agustín Lara, renowned Mexican musician
- Agustín Lizárraga (1865–1912), Peruvian explorer
- Agustín Barrios Mangoré (died 1944), eminent Paraguayan guitarist and composer
- Agustín Marchesín (born 1988), Argentine footballer
- Agustín Martegani (born 2000), Argentine footballer
- Agustín Moreno (born 1967), former tennis player
- Agustín Muñoz Grandes (1896–1970), Spanish general and politician
- Agustín Obando (born 2000), Argentine footballer
- Agustín Olvera (died 1876), pioneer of Los Angeles, California
- Agustín Orión (born 1981), Argentine footballer
- Agustín Palavecino (born 1996), Argentine footballer
- Agustín Pichot (born 1974), Argentine Rugby union player
- Agustin Presinger (1869–1934) German bishop and missionary
- Agustín Ramírez (1952–2022), Mexican singer-songwriter of Los Caminantes
- Agustín Ramos Calero (1919–1989), United States Army soldier
- Agustín Remiro (1904–1942), Aragonese soldier and spy
- Agustín Rodríguez Santiago (born 1959), Spanish footballer
- Agustín Ross (1844–1925), Chilean politician and founder of several institutions
- Agustín Rossi (born 1959), Argentine politician
- Agustín Rossi (footballer) (born 1995), Argentine goalkeeper
- Agustín Ruberto (born 2006), Argentine footballer
- Agustín Sández (born 2001), Argentine footballer
- Agustín Sierra (born 1990), Argentine actor
- Agustín Tosco (1930–1975), Argentine union leader
- Agustín Urzi (born 2000), Argentine footballer
- Agustín Vásquez Mendoza, 445th FBI Ten Most Wanted Fugitive
- Agustín Vernice (born 1995), Argentine sprint canoeist
- Agustí Villaronga (1953–2023), Spanish filmmaker
- Agustín Millán Vivero (1879–1920), Mexican general and politician
- Agustin Xaho (1811–1858), one of the most important Romantic Basque writers
- Louie Jon Agustin Sanchez, poet, fictionist, critic, and journalist

== Surname ==
- Ato Agustin (born 1963), Filipino basketball player
- José Agustín (1944–2024), Mexican novelist
- Joselito Agustin (1976–2010), also known as Aksyon Lito, Filipino journalist
- Laura María Agustín, human trafficking and informal labor markets researcher
- Manuel Agustín (1912–1997), Spanish field hockey player
- Marvin Agustin (born 1979), Filipino actor and entrepreneur
- Nalie Agustin (1988–2022), Canadian cancer activist
- Pedro Agustín (1512–1572), Spanish Catholic bishop
- Ucu Agustin (born 1976), Indonesian journalist, writer, and documentary filmmaker
- Antonio Agustín y Albanell (1516–1586), also known as Augustinus, Spanish Humanist historian, jurist, and Roman Catholic archbishop of Tarragona
- Francisco Agustín y Grande (1753–1800), Spanish painter

== See also ==
- Estadio Agustín Sánchez, La Chorrera, Panama
- Estadio Agustín Tovar, Barinas, Barinas, Venezuela
- Estadio Víctor Agustín Ugarte, Potosí, Bolivia
- Juan Agustín Maza University, Mendoza, Argentina
- Liceo Agustín Ross Edwards, high school in Pichilemu, Chile
- San Agustín
- Geographic Institute Agustín Codazzi, cartography authority of the government of Colombia
- Augustin (name), given name and surname
