= Augustine (given name) =

Given name

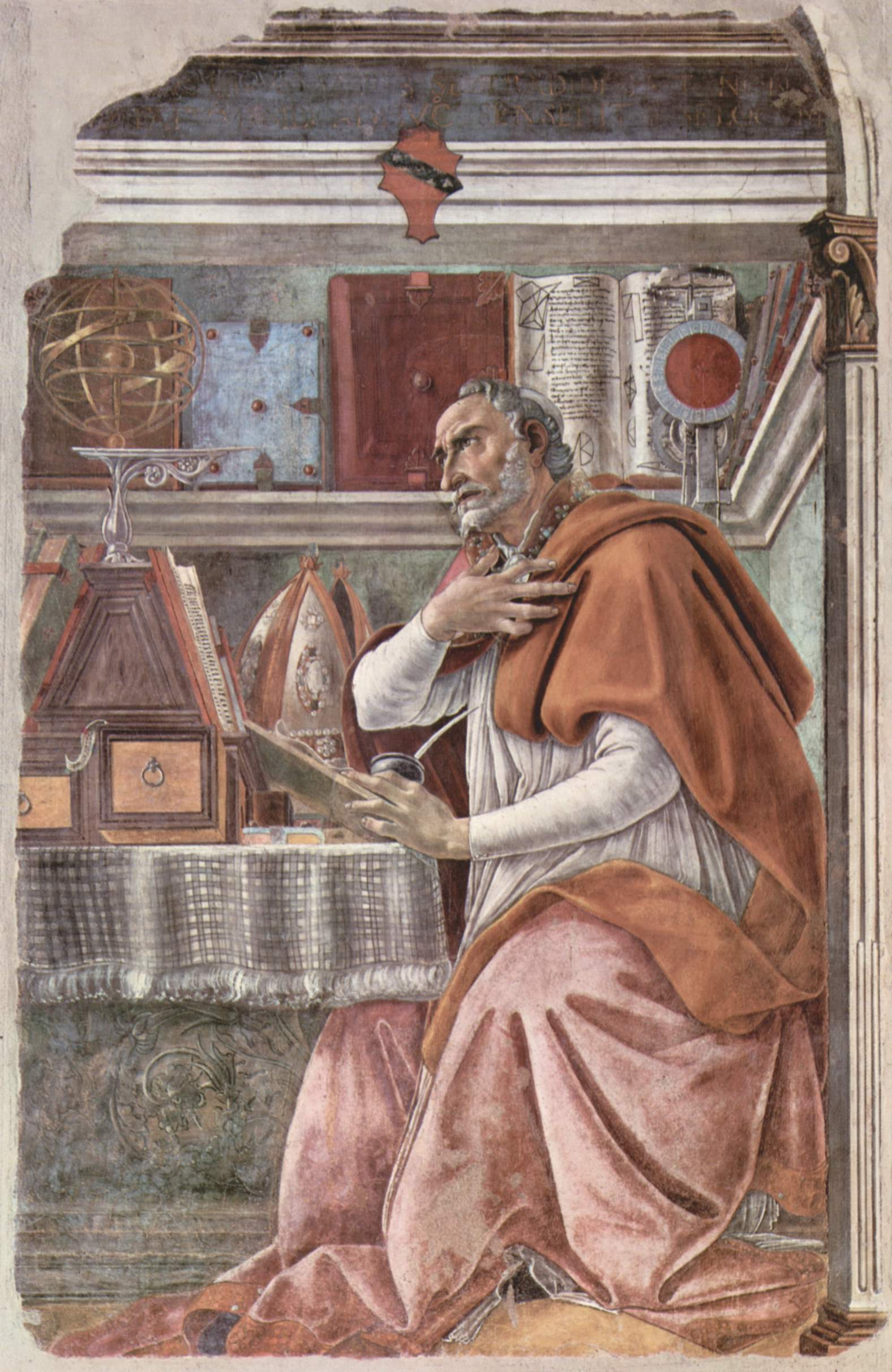
- Saint Augustine of Hippo as depicted by Sandro Botticelli. The name Augustine has been inspired by the popularity of this saint.
- Pronunciation: /ˈɔːɡəstiːn, ɔːˈɡʌstɪn/ AW-gə-steen, aw-GUST-in
- Gender: primarily male
- Language: Latin

Origin
- Meaning: "the great, venerable"

Other names
- See also: August, Sebastian, Austin

Augustine is a masculine given name derived from the Latin word augere, meaning "to increase." The Latin form Augustinus is developed from Augustus which means "venerable" and was a title given to Roman emperors. Saint Augustine of Hippo was a significant early Christian theologian and Doctor of the Church and his prominence in Catholic and Protestant theology contributed to the given name's spread across Europe and into further continents through evangelism.

In both the vulgar of French and English used in the High Middle Ages, the name was frequently shortened to or pronounced as Aoustin or Austin respectively. For the latter, usage is attested at least back to the time of Chaucer. Within the United States, both Augustine and Austin have additionally been used very rarely for girls.

The shortened form, Austin, has ranked in the top 50 names given to baby boys born in the United States from 1990 to 2007. The Spanish form, Agustín, was the most popular name given to baby boys born in Uruguay in 2006 and in Chile in 2012 and 2013. Agustina, the Spanish feminine, was the third most popular name used for girls born in Uruguay in 2006 and was the fifth most popular name for baby girls born in Buenos Aires in 2006, as well as the tenth most popular in Chile in 2014.

== Masculine variants ==
- Abhuistín (Irish)
- Ágaistín (Irish)
- Aggusteinus (Faroese)
- Aggustiinusi (Greenlandic)
- Aggustînuse (Greenlandic)
- Ághuistín (Irish)
- Agostico (Mirandese)
- Agostín (Aragonese)
- Agostin (Venetian)
- Agostinho (Portuguese)
- Agostini (Albanian)
- Agostiño (Galician)
- Agostino (Italian)
- Ágoston (Hungarian)
- Águistín (Irish)
- Agustí (Catalan)
- Agustín (Asturian, Spanish)
- Agustin (Basque, Indonesian, Piedmontese, Tagalog)
- Ágústínus (Icelandic)
- Agustinus (Indonesian)
- Agusztav (Hungarian)
- Aibhistín (Irish)
- Aksnes (Norwegian)
- Aogustin (Breton)
- Aostin (Ligurian)
- Aoustin (Old French)
- Août (French)
- Augostėns (Samogitian)
- Augusten (German)
- Aŭgusteno (Esperanto)
- Augustijn (Dutch)
- Augustin (Croatian, Czech, Danish, Faroese, Finnish, French, German, Indonesian, Norwegian, Romanian, Swedish)
- Augustín (Czech, Slovak)
- Augustinas (Lithuanian)
- Augustine (Danish, English, Finnish, Indonesian, Norwegian, Swedish)
- Augustinô (Vietnamese)
- Augustīns (Latvian)
- Augustinus (Latin, Danish, Finnish, German, Javanese, Norwegian, Swedish, Turkish)
- Augustînus (Kurdish (Hawar))
- Augustýn (Czech, Slovak)
- Augustyn (Polish)
- Aukusti (Finnish)
- Austen (English)
- Austin (English, Old French, Danish, Finnish, Indonesian, Norwegian, Swedish)
- Austinu (Corsican, Sardinian, Sicilian)
- Austyn (English)
- Avguštin (Slovenian)
- Avqustin (Azerbaijani)
- Awstin (Welsh)
- Eosten (Breton)
- Ogustin Walloon)
- Oistín (Irish)
- Wistin (Maltese)
- Αυγουστίνος (Augoustínos, Av̱goustínos) (Greek)
- Августин (Avgustin, Avhustyn) (Bulgarian, Macedonian, Russian, Serbian, Ukrainian)
- Аўгустын (Aŭgustyn, Aŭhustyn) (Belarusian)
- ავგუსტინე (Avgustin) (Georgian)
- ئۆگەستین (Kurdish (Sorani))
- أوغستين (Arabic)
- آگوستین (Persian)
- آگسٹین (Urdu)
- אוגוסטינוס (Hebrew)
- ኦግስቲን (Amharic)
- अगस्टाइन (Agasṭā'ina) (Hindi)
- अगस्टिनले (Agasṭinalē) (Nepali)
- ਆਗਸ੍ਟੀਨ آگسٹین (Āgasṭīna) (Punjabi)
- ઓગસ્ટિન (Ōgasṭina) (Gujarati)
- அகஸ்டின் (Akasṭiṉ) (Tamil)
- അഗസ്റ്റിൻ (Malayalam)
- ഓസ്റ്റിൻ (Malayalam)
- ఆగష్టీటియన్ (Āgaṣṭīṭiyan) (Telugu)
- ಅಗಸ್ಟೀನ್ (Agasṭīn) (Kannada)
- ဩဂတ်စတင်း (Burmese)
- ออกัสติน (Xxkạs̄tin) (Thai)
- アウグスティヌス (Augusutinusu) (Japanese)
- 아우구스티누스 (Augustinus) (Korean)
- 奥古斯丁 (Àogǔsīdīng) (Chinese Traditional and Simplified)

=== Diminutive and pet forms ===
- Agus (Spanish)
- Aku (Finnish)
- Augie (English)
- Auke (Frisian)
- Dino (Indonesian, Italian, Croatian)
- Gucio (Polish)
- Gus (English, Scottish, French)
- Gusta (Czech, Slovak)
- Gustin (French)
- Gutek (Polish)
- Guus (Dutch)
- Kusti (Finnish)
- Stijn (Dutch)
- Tauno (Finnish)
- Tijn (Dutch)
- Tin (Croatian)
- Tincho (Basque)
- Tino (Indonesian, Spanish)
- Tintin (French)

== Feminine variants ==
- Aggustiina (Greenlandic)
- Agostinha (Portuguese)
- Agustina (Spanish, Indonesian)
- Ágústína (Icelandic)
- Agostina (Italian)
- Agostiña (Galician)
- Akustiina (Finnish)
- Augusteen (Hiberno-English)
- Augustina (Latin, Lithuanian, Danish, Norwegian, Romanian, Swedish)
- Augustîna (Greenlandic)
- Augustine (Danish, Faroese, Finnish, French, German, Greenlandic, Norwegian, Swedish)
- Augustia (English)
- Augustiina (Finnish)
- Augustyna (Polish)
- Austen (English)
- Austin (English, Indonesian)
- Austina (English, Indonesian)
- Austine (English)
- Austyn (English)
- Austyna (English)
- Austyne (English)
- Avgustîna (Greenlandic)

=== Diminutive and pet forms ===
- Auga (Swedish)
- Dina (English, Indonesian, Italian)
- Gussie (English)
- Gusta (Dutch)
- Guusje (Dutch)
- Stina (Danish, Finnish, Faroese, Greenlandic, Norwegian, Swedish)
- Tina (Danish, English, Finnish, Faroese, Greenlandic, Indonesian, Norwegian, Spanish, Swedish)
- Agus (Spanish)

== See also ==
- List of people with given name Augustine
- Augustin (name), given name and surname
- Augustine (surname)
