= Closed couplet =

Poetic units of verse

In poetics, closed couplets are two line units of verse that do not extend their sense beyond the line's end. Furthermore, the lines are usually rhymed. When the lines are in iambic pentameter, they are referred to as heroic verse. However, Samuel Butler also used closed couplets in his iambic tetrameter Hudibrastic verse.

"True wit is nature to advantage dressed
What oft was thought, but ne'er so well express'd"

is an example of the closed couplet in heroic verse from Alexander Pope's Essay on Criticism.
