= Mary Ann Augustin =

Australian scientist

Mary Ann Augustin (born 16 April 1954, Kedah, Malaysia) is an Australian food chemist and dairy scientist who leads the Food Science Research Program at CSIRO. Much of her work has focused on understanding the changes that occur during dairy milk processing and the effect these changes exhibit on the proteins and minerals of milk, which are collectively referred to as "milk functionality".

Augustin researches emerging food processing technologies and approaches to food processing for dairy and milk products, fish oils and probiotics. She leads the research on CSIRO's patented microencapsulation system, a high-tech ingredient-delivery technology. Her research on the chemistry of milk modifications has led to the development of specialised milk powders that improve the performance of liquid milk products as food ingredients. The most extensively used of Augustin's innovations is a technology that allows milk powder manufacturers to guarantee that their product will be stable during subsequent processing in the manufacture of recombined products. Notably, she was also the driving force behind the research that produced calcium-enriched milk, enabling adults to ingest their recommended daily calcium intake from fewer than two glasses of the fortified milk.

== Tertiary education and early career ==
Augustin graduated with a Bachelor of Science degree with First Class Honours from Monash University, where she was also awarded her PhD. She began her career with CSIRO laboratories in 1988 and as of 2019, she was the Chief Research Scientist for its Agriculture and Food department. She was appointed as a Professional Fellow in the School of Chemistry at Monash University in 2005 as part of a special collaboration between CSIRO and Monash University.

== Career highlights ==
In addition to her extensive career with the CSIRO, Augustin has also contributed to other food science organisations:

- Member of the Scientific Programme Advisory Committee for the Malaysian Palm Oil Board (2005-2010)
- Project team member for the United Nations' Food and Agriculture Organization's High Level Panel of Experts on Food Security and Nutrition (2019)
- Deputy Chair of the Australian Academy of Technology and Engineering, Agricultural Forum (August 2014-March 2018)
- Expert panel member on food security at the International Union of Food Science and Technology (July 2015-March 2018)

== Awards ==
- American Oil Chemists Society Corporate Achievement Award (Team Award) 2013
- Newton Turner Award (CSIRO) 2008
- American Oil Chemists Society Corporate Achievement Award (Team Award) 2003
- JR Vickery Address (recognition by the Australian Institute of Food Science and Technology) 2001
- Women in Business (recognition by the Commonwealth of Australia) 2001
- Selected successful Australian businesswomen's contributions to the Australian industry (recognition by the Commonwealth of Australia - Ministry for Industry, Science and Resources) 2001
- JR Vickery Address (recognition by the Australian Institute of Food Science and Technology) 2001
- Sir Ian McLennan Achievement For Industry Award 1998
- Loftus-Hills Silver Medal (Dairy Industry Association of Australia) 1997

== Selected publications ==
- 2014 Crittenden R, Sanguansri L, Augustin MA. Probiotic storage and delivery. https://www.researchgate.net/publication/302792675_Probiotic_storage_and_delivery
- 2014 Tan S, Rupasinghe T, Tull DL, Boughton B, Oliver C, McSweeney CS, Gras S, Augustin MA. Degradation of curcuminoids by in vitro pure culture fermentation. https://pubs.acs.org/doi/10.1021/jf5031168
- 2014 Lim YM, Yao S, Gras S, McSweeney CS, Lockett T, Augustin MA, Gooley PR. Hydrodynamic radii of solubilized high amylose native and modified starches by pulsed field gradient NMR diffusion measurements. https://linkinghub.elsevier.com/retrieve/pii/S0268005X14000496
- 2014 Wu, L, Melton L, Sanguansri L, Augustin MA. The batch adsorption of the epigallocatechin gallate onto apple pomace. https://linkinghub.elsevier.com/retrieve/pii/S0308814614005019
- 2014 Sanguansri L, Rusli JK, Shen Z, Cheng LJ, Keogh J, Clifton PM, Augustin MA. Digestion of microencapsulated oil powders: In vitro lipolysis and In vivo absorption from a food matrix. https://pubs.rsc.org/en/content/articlelanding/2014/fo/c4fo00743c
- 2014 Shen Z, Bhail S, Sanguansri L, Augustin MA. Improving the oxidative stability of krill oil-in-water emulsions. https://doi.org/10.1007/s11746-014-2489-z
- 2014 Logan S, Leis A, Day L, Oiseth SK, Puvanenthiran A, Augustin MA. Rennet gelation properties of milk: Influence of natural variation in milk fat globule size and casein micelle size. https://doi.org/10.1016/j.idairyj.2014.08.005
- 2014 Fu S, Shen Z, Ajlouni S, Ng K, Sanguansri L, Augustin MA. Interactions of buttermilk with curcuminoids. Food Chem. Apr 15;149:47-53. PMID 24295675
- 2014 Oliver CM, Mawson R, Melton LD, Dumsday G, Welch J, Sanguansri P, Singh TK, Augustin MA. Sequential low and medium frequency ultrasound assists biodegradation of wheat chaff by white rot fungal enzymes. Carbohydr Polym. Oct 13;111:183-90. PMID 25037341
- 2013 Sanguansri L1, Shen Z, Weerakkody R, Barnes M, Lockett T, Augustin MA. Omega-3 fatty acids in ileal effluent after consuming different foods containing microencapsulated fish oil powder - an ileostomy study. Food Funct. Jan;4(1):74-82. PMID 22992723
- 2013 Sanguansri L, Day L, Shen Z, Fagan P, Weerakkody R, Cheng LJ, Rusli J, Augustin MA. Encapsulation of mixtures of tuna oil, tributyrin and resveratrol in a spray dried powder formulation. Food Funct. Dec;4(12):1794-802. PMID 24121865
- 2013 Sanguansri L, Shen Z, Weerakkody R, Barnes M, Lockett T, Augustin MA. Omega-3 fatty acids in ileal effluent after consuming different foods containing microencapsulated fish oil powder - an ileostomy study. Food Funct. 2013 Jan;4(1):74-82. PMID 22992723
- 2010 Chandrapala J, McKinnon I, Augustin MA, Udabage P. The influence of milk composition on pH and calcium activity measured in situ during heat treatment of reconstituted skim milk. Journal of Dairy Research. 77: 257–264. PMID 20196897
- 2010 Ying DY, Phoon MC, Sanguansri L, Weerakkody R, Burgar MI, Augustin MA. Microencapsulated Lactobacillus Rhamnosus GG Powders: Relationship of Powder Physical Properties to Probiotic Survival During Storage. Journal of Food Science. 75(9): E588-E595 PMID 21535593
- 2010 Shen ZP, Augustin MA, Sanguansri L, Cheng LJ. Oxidative stability of microencapsulated fish oil powders stabilized by blends of chitosan, modified starch and glucose. Journal of Agricultural and Food Chemistry. 58 (7): 4487–4493. PMID 20222732
- 2009 Oliver CM, Augustin MA, Sanguansri L. Maillard-based casein-carbohydrate microcapsules for the delivery of fish oil. Australian Journal of Dairy Technology. 64(1): 80-83.
- 2009 Augustin MA, Sanguansri P. Nanostructured materials in the food industry. Adv Food Nutr Res. vol 58:183-213. Review. PMID 19878860
- 2009 McKinnon IR, Yap SE, Augustin MA, Hemar Y. Diffusing-wave spectroscopy investigation of heated skim milks containing calcium chloride. Food Hydrocolloids. 23: 1127–1133.
- 2009 Augustin MA1, Hemar Y. Nano- and micro-structured assemblies for encapsulation of food ingredients. Chem Soc Rev. Apr;38(4):902-12. PMID 19421570
- 2007 Augustin MA1, Udabage P. Influence of processing on functionality of milk and dairy proteins. Adv Food Nutr Res. vol 53:1-38 PMID 17900495
- 2006 Crittenden R, Weerakkody R, Sanguansri L, Augustin M. Synbiotic microcapsules that enhance microbial viability during nonrefrigerated storage and gastrointestinal transit. Appl Environ Microbiol. Mar;72(3):2280-2. PMID 16517688 PMID 16517688
- 2001 Udabage P, McKinnon IR, Augustin MA. Effects of mineral salts and calcium chelating agents on the gelation of renneted skim milk. J Dairy Sci. Jul;84(7):1569-75. PMID 11467804
- 2000 Udabage P, McKinnon IR, Augustin MA. Mineral and casein equilibria in milk: effects of added salts and calcium-chelating agents. J Dairy Res. Aug;67(3):361-70. PMID 11037232
- 1996 Ward BR, Goddard SJ, Augustin MA, McKinnon IR. Distribution of proteins in concentrated skim milk reconstituted from low- and high-heat milk powders. J Dairy Res. Nov;63(4):643-8. PMID 8933311

== Patents ==
- Ashokkumar M, Kentish S, Lee J U-L, Zisu B, Palmer M and Augustin M. Processing Dairy Ingredients. WO2009079691.
- Sanguansri P, Augustin MA and Htoon A. Starch Treatment Process. WO2005105851.
- Sanguansri L, Augustin MA and Crittenden R. Probiotic Storage and Delivery. WO2005030229.
- Augustin MA, Sanguansri L and Head R. Gastro-intestinal Tract Delivery Systems. WO2005048998.
- Sanguansri L and Augustin MA. Encapsulation of Food Ingredients. WO200174175.
- Augustin MA and Williams R. Nutritional Mineral Fortification of Milk. WO200172135 A1.
