= Agustina Palacio de Libarona =

Argentine writer, storyteller and heroine

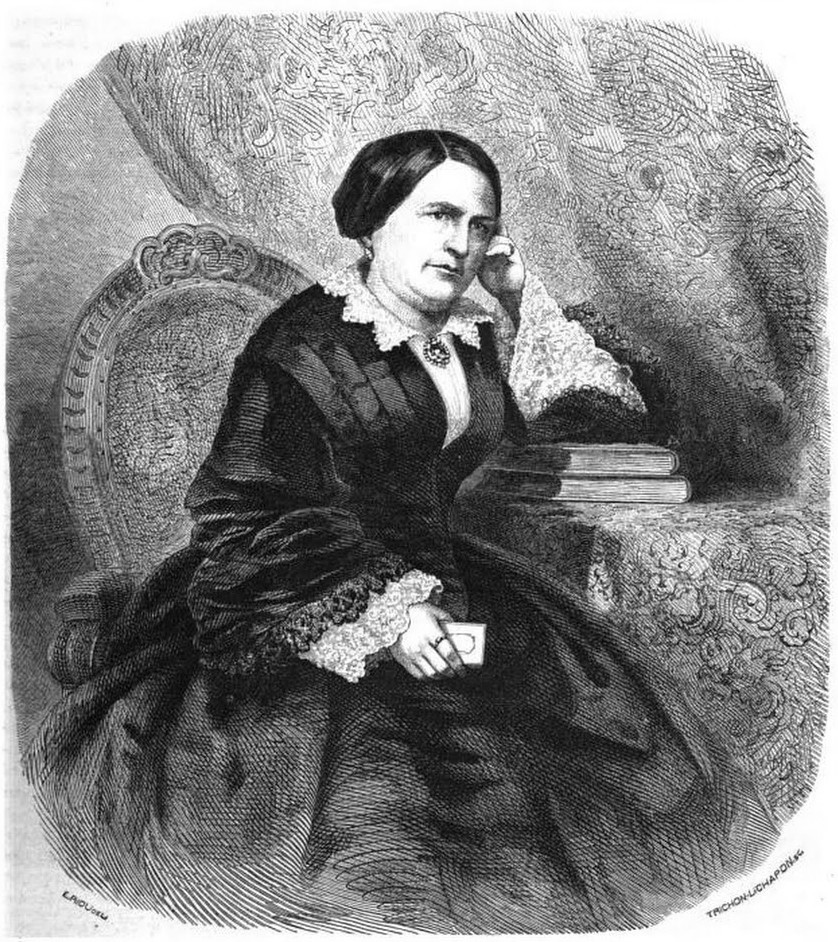
Agustina Palacio de Libarona

Agustina Palacio de Libarona (also known as La Heroína del Bracho; February 1, 1825 – December 13, 1880) was a 19th-century Argentine writer, storyteller, and heroine. A member of an elite family from Santiago, her husband was Capt. José María Libarona. She became known in her province for facing the federal leader and governor of Santiago del Estero, Juan Felipe Ibarra, who had imprisoned Capt. Libarona. Palacio's writing recounted in detail the hardships suffered by her and her husband, which ultimately led to the death of Capt. Libarona.

== Biography ==
Agustina Palacio was born in Santiago del Estero, February 1, 1825. Her father was Santiago Palacio, who was governor of Santiago del Estero during 1830 and 1832. Her mother was María Antonia Gastañaduy. Her husband was Captain José María Libarona, with whom she had two daughters: Elisa and Lucinda. In 1840, Capt. Libarona participated in a failed revolt against Ibarra, who was then the governor of Santiago del Estero. This enraged the caudillo, who ordered that all those who participated in the revolt be exiled to El Bracho. Palacio accompanied her husband while he was a prisoner, taking care of him, until he went completely mad and died. Palacio became a heroine in her province because of her manuscripts about her experiences in El Bracho (The Bracho). In 1852, with the fall of Juan Manuel de Rosas, Argentina reorganized itself and the new president, Justo José de Urquiza asked the French scientist Victor Martin de Moussy to undertake an extensive study of the geography and population of Argentina.

According to accounts, De Moussy and his colleague Benjamín Poucel traveled to Salta due to a rumor about a woman who had an interesting experience. When they met with Palacio and heard her story, they decided to write it in a manuscript that would be published in 1858 in the newspaper, Religión de Félix Frías and translated into French in 1861.

This same story would later be published in various parts of the world and translated into various languages, especially in newspapers and travel anthologies. In 1863, Palacio's story appeared in the notable magazine Correo de Ultramar and in Buenos Aires' newspapers. The narrative of the "heroine of Bracho" really took on importance from 1866, when it was published in Madrid in the fifth volume of La vuelva al mundo (The return to the world).

== Death and legacy ==
According to references by Jorge Iramain, extracted from family letters, Palacio died in Salta, Argentina on December 13, 1880. A town in Santiago del Estero is named after her.

== Bibliography ==
- Alén Lascano, Luis C., Historia de Santiago del Estero, Ed. Plus Ultra, Buenos. Aires., 1991. ISBN 950-21-1034-X (in Spanish)
