= Augustín Hambálek =

Slovak politician (born 1957)

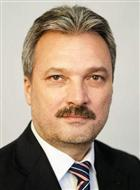

Member of the National Council
- Incumbent
- Assumed office 24 February 2021
- In office 4 April 2012 – 20 March 2020

Personal details
- Born: 16 July 1957 (age 68) Trnava, Czechoslovakia
- Party: Direction – Slovak Social Democracy
- Education: Slovak University of Technology in Bratislava

Augustín Hambálek (born 16 July 1957) is a Slovak politician. He has served as a member of the National Council of Slovakia from 2012 to 2020 and again since 2021.

== Biography ==
Augustín Hambálek was born on 16 July 1957 in Trnava. He studied management at the Slovak University of Technology in Bratislava, graduating in 1981. Afterwards, he worked as an economist for city council in Trnava. In 2002 he was elected a Deputy Governor of the Trnava Region.

In the 2012 Slovak parliamentary election, Hambálek was elected MP on the list of Direction – Social Democracy but refused to give up his position as the Deputy Governor of the Trnava Region. In addition to holding multiple public offices at the same time, another MP Miroslav Beblavý accused Hambálek of not disclosing his business interests and property holdings in full. Over his tenure as an MP, he has been among the least active members of the National Council. Nonetheless, he is among the longest serving MPs. In 2020 Slovak parliamentary election, he returned to the National Council as a replacement for the deceased MP Ľubomír Petrák.
