= Augie and Margo Rodriguez =

American husband-and-wife dance team

Palladium owner Maxwell Hyman (center) with Augie and Margo Rodriguez (Photo by Harry Fine)

Augustin "Augie" Rodriguez (May 13, 1928 – July 18, 2014) and Margo Bartolomei Rodriguez (April 6, 1929 – January 29, 2019) were American dancers who helped popularize the Mambo.

Both were born in New York City. They married in 1950 and opened shows for Sammy Davis Jr. and other stars throughout North America, and Europe. Their professional debut was at the Waldorf Astoria in 1955 with Harry Belafonte but, prior to this, they were the popular adagio dance team at both the New York City Palladium Ballroom, and Roseland Ballroom where the Mambo craze began.

Augie Rodriguez died from cancer at the couple's Deerfield Beach, Florida home on July 18, 2014.
