= Dacian fortress of Augustin =

- Location within Romania
- 46.0451°N 25.5473°E
- Location: Tipia Ormenișului, Ţepelul Ormenișului, Augustin, Brașov, Romania

Site notes
- Condition: Ruined

Monument istoric
- Reference no.: BV-I-m-A-11260.01

It was a Dacian fortified town.
