= Augustine Périé =

French Catholic missionary

Augustine Périé (14 August 1832 — 16 January 1892) was a Catholic missionary who was active in Penang, Malaysia and Singapore.

== Early life ==
Périé was born in Saint-Chamarand, France on 14 August 1832. He joined the Paris Foreign Missions Society seminary on 4 October 1856. He was ordained a priest on 18 June 1859.

== Career ==
Périé was first sent to Permatang Tinggi, Penang, Malaysia and then to Batu Kawan. In 1860, he was sent to Bukit Timah, Singapore to head the Bukit Timah mission. In 1562, he established the St Mary's Chapel in Kranji.

In 1863, Périé went back to Malaysia and established a mission station in Pontian Kitsil along the Pontian River. In exchange for the land on which the colony was built, which was provided by Abu Bakar of Johor, Périé was appointed the kangchu of the river. He soon banned gambling and opium within the colony, which deterred non-Christian Chinese from settling. The colony's terrain was marshy and further deterred potential settlers. In 1864, fears that a secret society was about to launch an attack on the church drove most Singapore Chinese migrants away to Pontian, with only 15 Chinese planters remaining.

Périé established another colony in Ayer Itam in 1867. In the following year, he returned to Bukit Timah, Singapore. He returned to France in 1870 due to his declining health.

After returning to France, he continued his pastoral work. In 1871, he became a parish priest in the commune of Pern. In 1872, he became chaplain of Rocamadour. In 1874, he became a parish priest in the commune of Le Roc. He died there on 16 January 1892.
