= Juan Agustín Maza University =

Argentinian private university

- Universidad Juan Agustín Maza
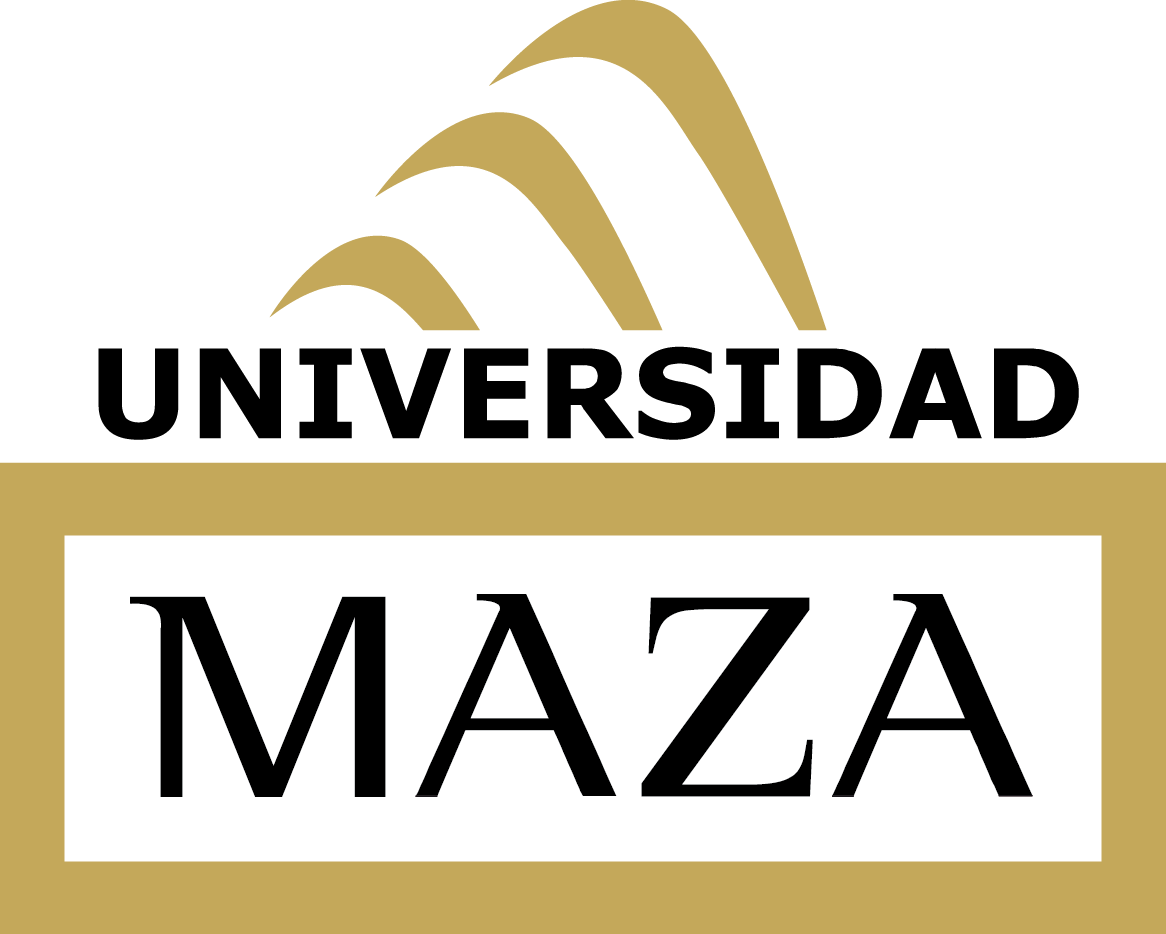
- Type: Private
- Established: May 4, 1960
- Rector: Md Daniel Miranda
- Location: Av. de Acceso Este - Lateral Sur 2245, Guaymallén, Mendoza, Argentina, Guaymallén, Mendoza, Argentina; 32.898624°S 68.811697°W
- Website: http://www.umaza.edu.ar/

The Juan Agustín Maza University is a private university located in Las Cañas district, Guaymallén department in Mendoza, Argentina. It was founded on May 4, 1960, as a non-profit organization.

== Schools ==
- School of Pharmacy and Biochemistry
- School of Nutritional Sciences
- School of Veterinary and Environment Sciences
- School of Journalism
- School of Educational Sciences
- School of Business
- School of Engineering
- School of Kinesiology and Physical Therapy
- School of Enology and
- School of Social Sciences and Communications

Agribusiness
