= Augustin Cabanès =

French doctor and writer (1862–1928)

Dr. Augustin Cabanès
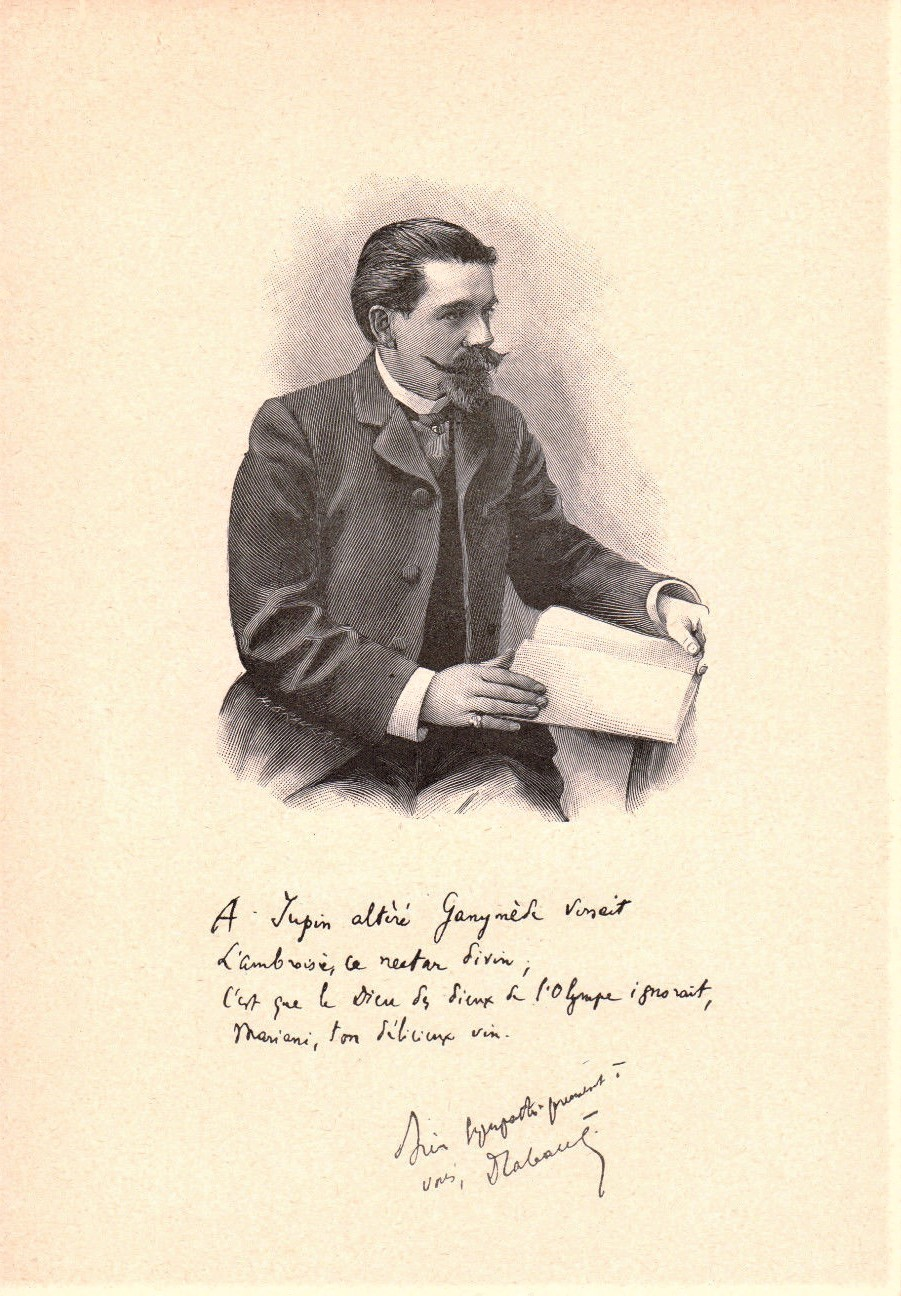
- Born: 30 April 1862; Gourdon-en-Caorsin, France
- Died: 5 May 1928 (aged 66)
- Occupations: Doctor, Writer, Historian
- Writing career
- Pen name: Doctor Quercy

Dr. Augustin Cabanès (30 April 1862 – 5 May 1928) was a French medical doctor, historian and writer of numerous works of fiction and history. He was known for his books on historical medical mysteries.

He studied medicine in Bordeaux and Paris, defending his doctorate in 1889 with a thesis involving Hydrastis canadensis. As a physician, he was associated with the Préfecture de la Seine. In 1894, he founded Chronique médicale, a popular journal dealing with unpublished articles on the health of literary and historical figures.

== Partial list of works ==
- Marat inconnu; l'homme privé, le médecin, le savant (1891)
- Le cabinet secret de l'histoire, (1897), "Secret Cabinet of History Peeped into By a Doctor".
- "Curious Bypaths of History: Being Medico-Historical Studies and Observations" (1898)
- Balzac ignoré (1899)
- Les Morts mysterieuses de l'histoire (1900)
- Les indiscrétions de l'histoire (1900)
- Mœurs intimes du passé (1900)
- Les curiosités de la médecine (1900)
- La névrose révolutionnaire (1906)
- Au chevet de l'empereur (1924)
- Les cinq sens (1926)
- Dans les coulisses de l'histoire (1929).
