= Manuel Agustín =

Spanish field hockey player (1912–1997)

Manuel Agustín Peypoch (12 April 1912 – 24 March 1997) was a Spanish field hockey player. He competed in the 1948 Summer Olympics.

He was a member of the Spanish field hockey team, which was eliminated in the group stage. He played all three matches as halfback in the tournament. He was born in Barcelona, where he also died.
