= Augustinian =

Augustinian may refer to:

- Augustinians, members of religious orders following the Rule of St Augustine
- Augustinianism, the teachings of Augustine of Hippo and his intellectual heirs
- Someone who follows Augustine of Hippo
- Canons Regular of Saint Augustine, also called "Augustinian Canons" or "Austin Canons"
- Order of Saint Augustine, a mendicant order, also called "Augustinian Friars" or "Austin Friars"

== See also ==
- Augustine (disambiguation)
