= Nalie Agustin =

Canadian health activist (1988–2022)

Natalie Pauline "Nalie" Agustin
- Born: November 7, 1988; Windsor, Ontario, Canada
- Died: March 22, 2022 (aged 33)
- Education: Vanier College, Concordia University
- Occupations: Health and wellness advocate, public speaker, author
- Years active: 2013–2022
- Known for: Cancer awareness advocacy, public speaking, online documentation of cancer journey
- Notable work: The Diary of Nalie
- Awards: CIBPA Person of the Year (2020)

Natalie Pauline "Nalie" Agustin (November 7, 1988 - March 22, 2022) was a Canadian health and wellness advocate, public speaker, and author who publicly shared her experience and subsequent death of metastatic breast cancer online.

== Early life and education ==
Agustin was born on November 7, 1988 in Windsor Ontario. Eight months after she was born, her family moved to Montreal, Quebec. Nalie grew up with her two brothers in Chateauguay, Quebec on the south shore of Montreal. From 2000 to 2002, Agustin lived in Sydney, Australia with her family.

After completing CEGEP in 2008 at Vanier College (2006-2008), Agustin enrolled at Concordia University and graduated with honors in 2011 with a Bachelor of Arts in Cultural and Communications Studies.

Agustin's first job was at La maison Simons as Assistant Manager, then Ecommerce Coordinator for Style Exchange, and later on she worked as a Project Manager for Leucan Foundation a Quebec-based organization that works with children with Cancer

In 2013, shortly after graduating from Concordia, at the age of 24, Agustin was diagnosed with breast cancer. She decided to document the experience online - including chemotherapy, mastectomy, radiation and reconstructive surgery - that generated a platform and community of numerous supporters and advocates.

Over a nine-year period, Agustin documented her health issues. These included the importance of early diagnosis, treatment protocols, remission in 2004 and a recurrence that led to metastases in the lungs in 2017 and the brain and liver in 2020, along with advice for coping with conventional and complementary therapies.

== Work and legacy ==
In 2013, Agustin became the Ambassador for the Canadian Breast Cancer Foundation for several years and raised funds for its annual Run for the Cure campaign. Agustin also collaborated with the McGill University Health Centre on various initiatives, including the photo and art exhibit titled Breast(s): A Different Kind of Cancer story. which aimed to humanize and diversify the portrayal of breast cancer.

Agustin's legacy includes the publication of the e-guide Chemo Secrets: Tips, Tricks and Real Life Experiences from a Young Breast Cancer Survivor co-hosting the podcast Thriver Talks, founding the #Feelitonthefirst movement, hosted and produced The Nalie Show, a keynote speaker for Miami Breast Cancer Conference attended by 1000 oncologist, collaborating with brands like Apple and Rihanna's Savage X Fenty, rapper French Montana to being featured in publications like Psychologies. Marie-Claire, Montréal Sante. She also gave talks at Tedx and Walrus. During the 2018 Influence Montreal conference, Agustin was one of main speakers along with Nobel Peace Prize laureate Malala Yousafzai and Mayor Valérie Plante. Her work was intended to inspire people who were dealing with cancer.

The Canadian-Italian Business & Professional Association (CIBPA) honoured Agustin as its 2020 Person of the Year Award and created the Nalie Agustin Bursary for students wishing to pursue their medical degree.

In September 2021, Agustin published The Diary of Nalie: A Collection of Life Lessons and Reflections Shared While Thriving Through Stage IV Cancer. The book became Amazon's number one best-seller in Canada for several weeks.

Agustin died on March 22, 2022, aged 33. On April 4, a "celebration of life" was held and broadcast live on the internet.

On March 24 2022, Brenda Shanahan, Member of Parliament for Chateauguay-La Colle paid tribute to Agustin

"Nalie.. faced life with cancer with courage, creativity and humour as she shared her daily challenges on social and public media, as well as in her beautiful book of poetry and observations, The Diary of Nalie. Today we mourn Natalie, but as she said in her own words, "I want to be remembered by how I made you feel in my presence...I want to be remembered for always giving it my best and, despite how I felt or what was said, I never stopped believing in me—and you...I don't want to be admired, I want you to feel inspired. Through you and your inspired-living is how I wish to leave my legacy."

On April 8 2002, Emmanuella Lambropoulos Member of Parliament for Saint-Laurent, also paid tribute, saying

"Throughout her nine-year battle with cancer, Nalie experienced some of the darkest times that a human being can possibly face, and yet she always made room for light, inspiring so many others to do the same. She was an example to so many of my generation of what it meant to thrive with cancer. Nalie's journey and her outlook on life changed the lives of everyone who followed her. Her message to us all remains consistent and powerful: No matter what obstacles life might throw our way, there is always a silver lining. It is about letting the light in and choosing to believe that everything will turn out okay. What remains is the beautiful legacy that Nalie left behind. She will continue to live on in the hearts of the thousands of people that she touched with her light and love. "

A mural in her honor was unveiled in Montreal in August 2022.

In 2023, in accordance with one of her wishes, Agustin's Tree of Life was planted with her ashes at the Remembrance Grove in Cote de Neiges.

In a op-ed column of the Montreal Gazette, Fariha Naqvi-Mohamed paid tribute to Agustin, explaining she "made the world a better place" and how her actions on social media helped people.
