= Augustan Age =

Augustan Age may refer to

- the period of Roman history when Augustus was the first emperor
- the period of Latin literature associated with the reign of Augustus: see Augustan literature (ancient Rome)
- the early 18th century in British culture, when writers and other intellectuals admired and emulated the original Augustan Age: see Augustan literature and Augustan poetry
