= Ulmus americana 'Augustine' =

Elm cultivar

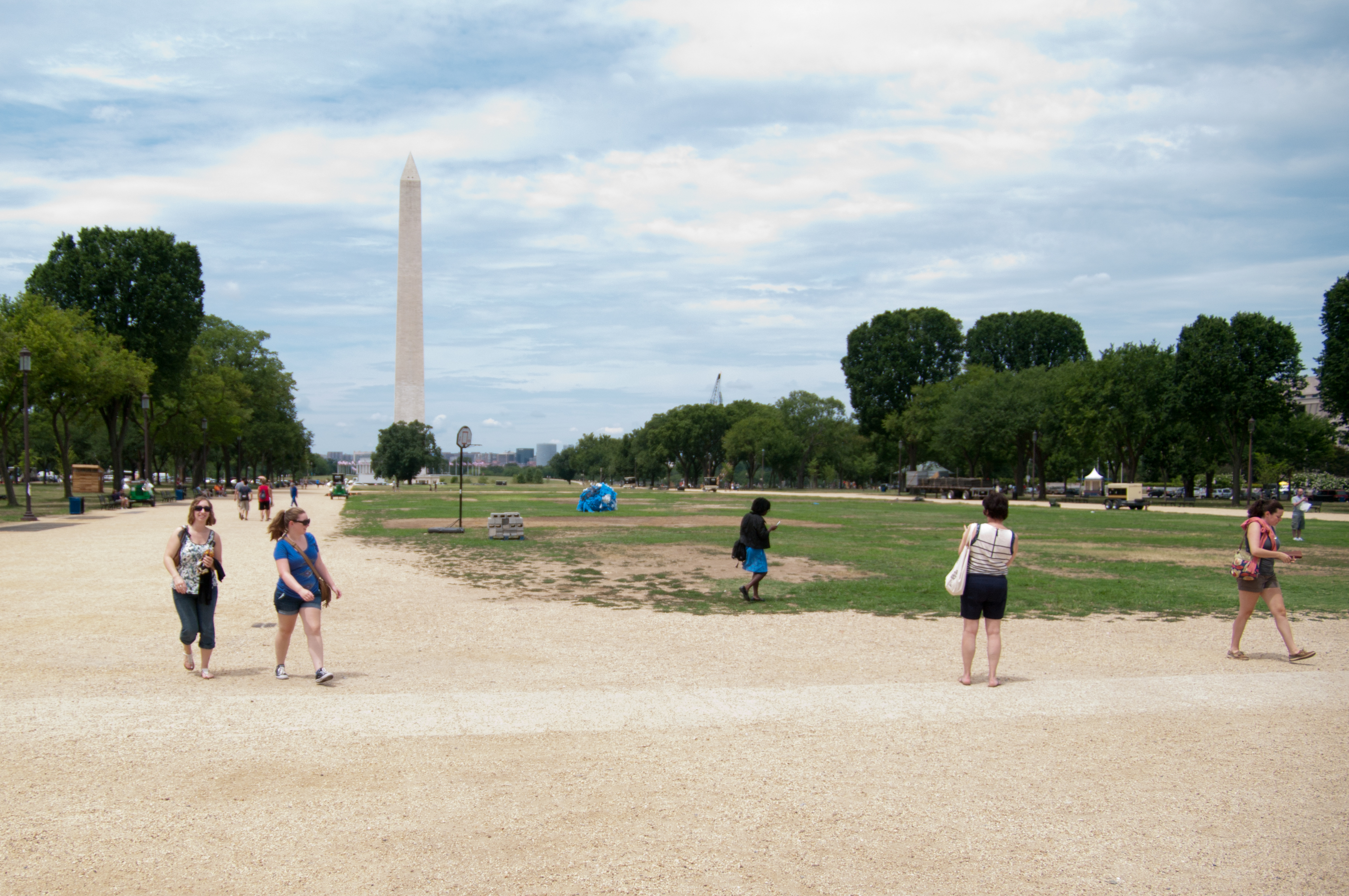
- 'Augustine Ascending' (the tallest trees) in the National Mall, Washington D.C.
- Species: Ulmus americana
- Cultivar: 'Augustine'
- Origin: Bloomington, Illinois, US

The American elm cultivar Ulmus americana 'Augustine', originally called 'Augustine Ascending', was cloned by Archie M. Augustine of the Augustine Nursery of Bloomington, Illinois, from a nursery seedling planted in 1927 in Normal, Illinois, and found to be columnar in habit.

See also the similar cultivars 'Columnaris' and 'Ascendens'. It is not known why such a promising clone as 'Ascendens' appears rare in cultivation, but 'Augustine Ascending' was released at about the same date. Neither Green nor Santamour suggested that they were synonyms.

== Description ==
'Augustine' is a vigorous fastigiate tree distinguished by its thicker branches and larger, more deeply toothed leaves. Flower and Garden Magazine reported that the original tree was still standing in 1959 and – erroneously – that the cultivar did not produce seed. The deep root-system of the cultivar was said to be less likely to damage sidewalks than American elm generally.

== Pests and diseases ==
'Augustine' has proven particularly susceptible to Dutch elm disease, exhibiting 36% crown dieback in one year after inoculation with the pathogen. The species is also highly susceptible to elm yellows and is also moderately preferred for feeding and reproduction by the adult elm leaf beetle Xanthogaleruca luteola, and highly preferred for feeding by the Japanese beetle Popillia japonica in the United States. U. americana is also the most susceptible of all the elms to verticillium wilt.

== Cultivation ==
As well as being planted originally as a highway elm in Illinois in locations such as Winnetka and Cicero (where a two-and-a-half mile median strip in a highway was lined with the cultivar), by 1956, 55,000 'Augustine' were reported thriving in thirty-eight states. 'Augustine' was among the elms planted in the United States National Arboretum, Washington, D.C., and, in the 1960s, in the National Mall, where despite Dutch elm disease, 32 were still standing in 2007 and 20 in 2018. The tree is not known to have been cultivated beyond the United States, where it is no longer in commerce.

== Synonymy ==
- 'Augustine Ascending': Weston, in Horticulture, II.30: 448, 1952.

== Accessions ==
=== North America ===
- Longwood Gardens, US. Acc. no. 1959-2682.
- Bartlett Tree Experts, US.. Acc. nos. 1368, L 332, (as 'Augustine Ascending').
- United States National Arboretum, Washington, D.C., US. Acc. no. 62665.
