= Michael Augustine =

Michael Augustine may refer to:

- Michael Augustine (bishop) (1933–2017), Indian Catholic archbishop of the Roman Catholic Archdiocese of Pondicherry and Cuddalore
- Michael Augustine (footballer) (born 1992), Nigerian footballer playing for the New England Revolution
