= Ramón de Zubiaurre =

Spanish artist (1882–1969)

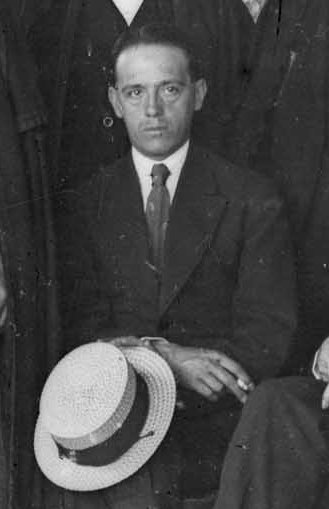
- Born: 1 September 1882; Vizcaya, Spain
- Died: 9 June 1969 (aged 86); Madrid, Spain
- Occupation: Artist

Ramón de Zubiaurre (1 September 1882 – 9 June 1969) was a Spanish artist. His work was part of the art competition at the 1932 Summer Olympics.
