= Augustin Zulueta Palace =

- Palacio Augustín Zulueta (Spanish)
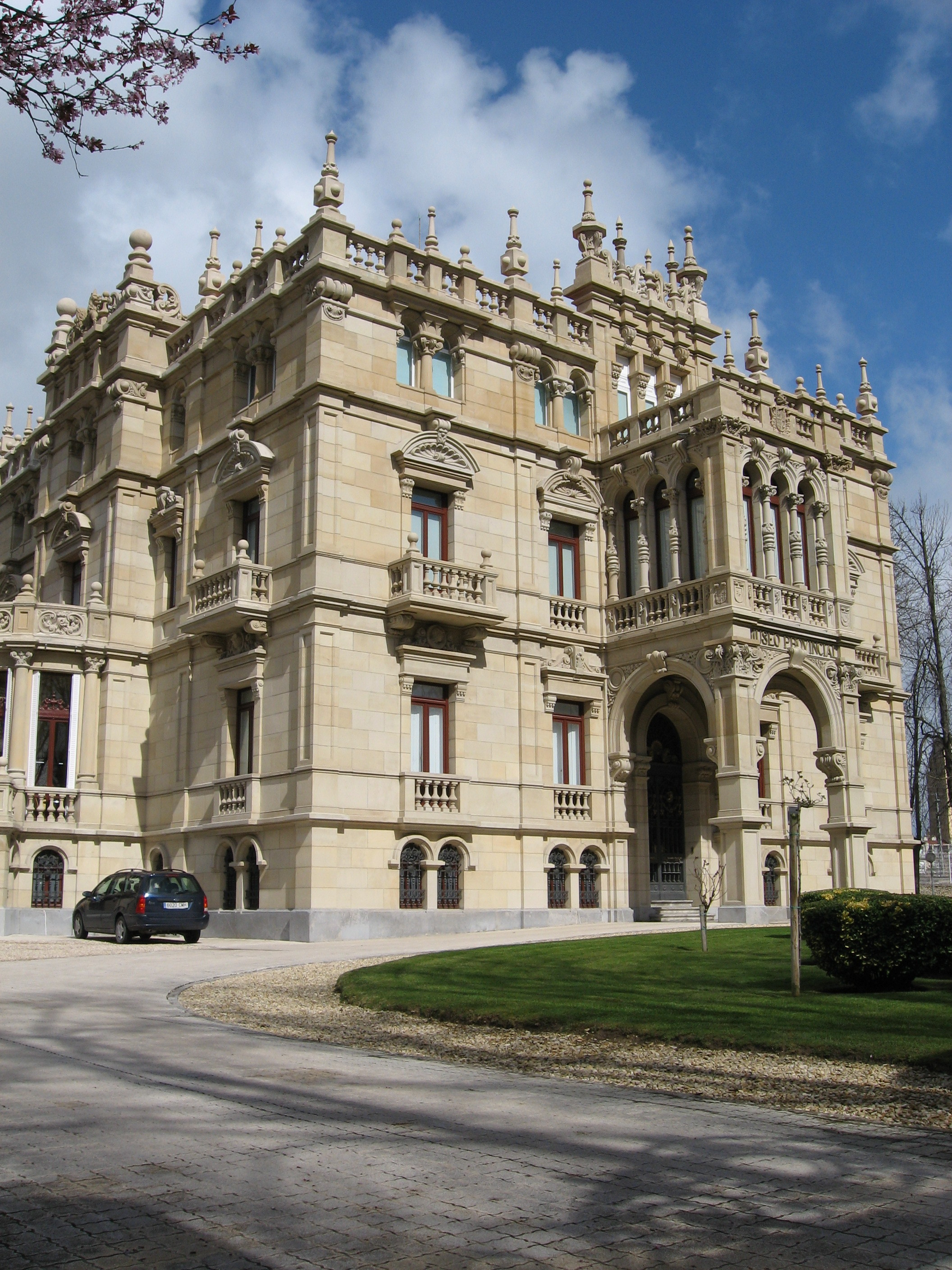

- Location within Spain
- 42.841619°N 2.679699°W
- Location: Vitoria, Spain

History
- Built: 1912

Site notes
- Architect(s): Julián Apraiz and Javier Luque
- Architectural style: Historicist
- Governing body: Regional Council of Álava

Spanish Cultural Heritage
- Official name: Palacio Augustin
- Type: Non-movable
- Criteria: Monument
- Designated: 1962
- Reference no.: RI-51-0001300

The Augustin Zulueta Palace (Spanish: Palacio Augustín Zulueta) is a palace located in Vitoria-Gazteiz, Álava, Spain, in Fray Francisco promenade, 8.

The palace was built in 1912 by the architects Julián de Apraiz and Javier Luque, designers of the New Cathedral of Vitoria-Gazteiz. They followed the taste of the wealthy families of that time. It was Don Ricardo de Augustin, developer of many other buildings, who ordered its construction.

The palace currently houses the Museum of Fine Arts of Álava (Museo de Bellas Artes de Álava). The museum is devoted to Spanish art from the 17th to the 20th centuries, as well as Basque art from 1850 to 1950.

It was declared Bien de Interés Cultural in 1962.

== History ==
=== Origin ===
In 1912 the Augustin-Zulueta matrimony (Elvira Zulueta and Ricardo de Augustin) begun the construction of their private dwelling in the Fray Francisco promenade. Elvira came from a wealthy family, and after his marriage with the lawyer from Madrid Ricardo de Augustin in 1905, they both decided to erect their personal palace in the noble zone of Vitoria-Gazteiz.

The marriage chose Javier Luque and Julián de Apraiz to lead the construction. Due to the fact that they had won the competition to restore the New Cathedral of Vitoria, they were the most remarkable architects in the city.

The hard job was ended in 1916, despite some details were not finished yet, and Elvira and Ricardo moved to the palace. Elvira died in 1917 and Ricardo left the city. As they had no offspring, the palace had to be given to the Catholic Church. However, in 1924, Ricardo de Augustin and the diocese made an arrangement so Ricardo could still be the owner of the palace while the diocese received some money. As a token of its appreciation, the diocese made Ricardo Count of Deávila.

=== Museum of Fine Art ===
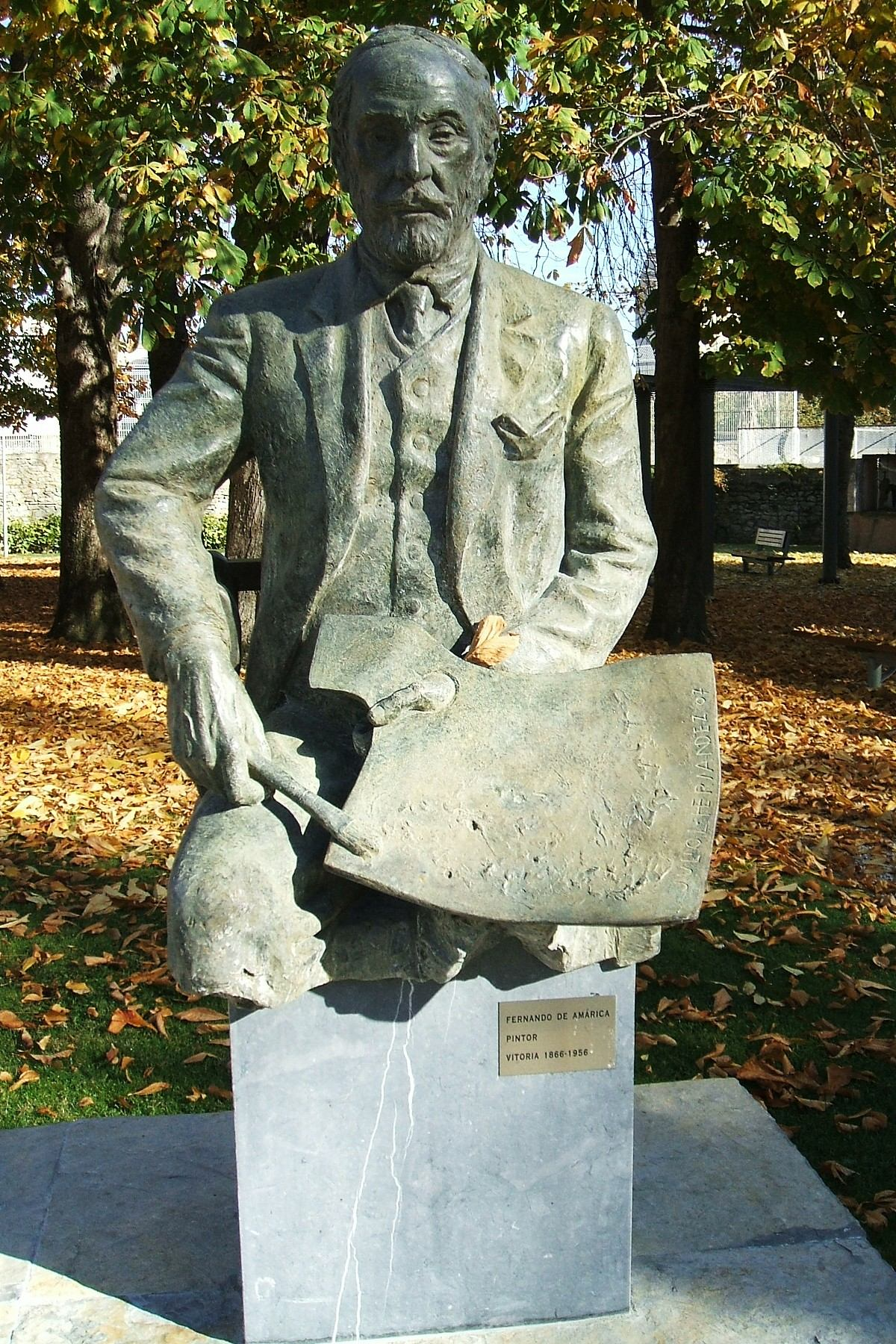
Fernando de Amárica's sculpture in the grounds of the Augustin Zulueta Palace

In 1941, the Regional Council of Álava bought the Augustin Zulueta Palace and prepared it to be the Museum of Fine Art. It was expected to be a place to keep the collections related to fine arts and archaeology, like the Library and the Provincial Archive. As a museum it gathered several stores from the Dioceses of Vitoria for religious art, from the Museo del Prado and the National Archaeologic Museum, from the School of Arts and Trades to keep some local paintings, and from some private citizens.

In the 1960s the D. Vidal Foundation and Fernando de Amárica made an agreement to exhibit Amárica's works on the palace. Because of that, an attachment, designed by Jesús Guinea, was added to the original structure in 1965.

In 1975 they began to bring a contemporary art collection together in the palace. The collection grew during the following decades and became one of the most coherent and completed collections in Spain.

Nowadays the palace is still used to house the Fine Art Museum. It is separated in three different zones: the original palace, the attached pavilion from the 1960s and the entrance pavilion.

== Architecture ==
The Augustin Zulueta Palace is known to be a good example of the historicist architecture, in which are involved many kind of styles and influences. It has a square floor and it is surrounded by a large garden.

The palace is made up of a basement and three floors. There are two smaller sections attached one to the front facade and the other to the left facade. The front facade has a vestibule with arcs in the main floor, a module covered by glass in the first floor, and a coat of arms in the second floor. The protruding part in the left consists of a staircase, separated in three sections.

=== Attachment ===
The attachment was designed by Jesús Guinea.

This part of the museum does not interfere with the original structure, however it is connected to it by the stairs. It has two floors (main floor and first floor) and its facade is similar to the palace's. Its neutral style and the vegetation surrounding it makes the attachment almost unnoticeable.

=== Restorations ===
The palace has undergone several restorations, all of them respecting the original building, so there have not been any change in the nature of the edifice. In 2000, the entrance to the palace was made more accessible for handicapped people, as it was needed to climb ten steps to enter the building. Later, a new attachment was built. This pavilion is the present entrance to the museum and it consists of a glass and wooden cube.
