= Parnelia Augustine =

American painter

Parnelia "Nell" Augustine (1884–1960) was an American painter. Her work can be seen at the Museum of Nebraska Art. She was born in Grand Island, Nebraska, the daughter of Dietrick, a printer, and Margaret Spethman. At the age of 14, she received special attention for her drawing at the 1898 Trans-Mississippi and International Exposition in Omaha, Nebraska.
