= Augustine Commission =

Augustine Commission may refer to either of two committees chaired by Norman Ralph Augustine:

- 1990 - Advisory Committee on the Future of the United States Space Program
- 2009 - Review of United States Human Space Flight Plans Committee
