= Permatang Tinggi =

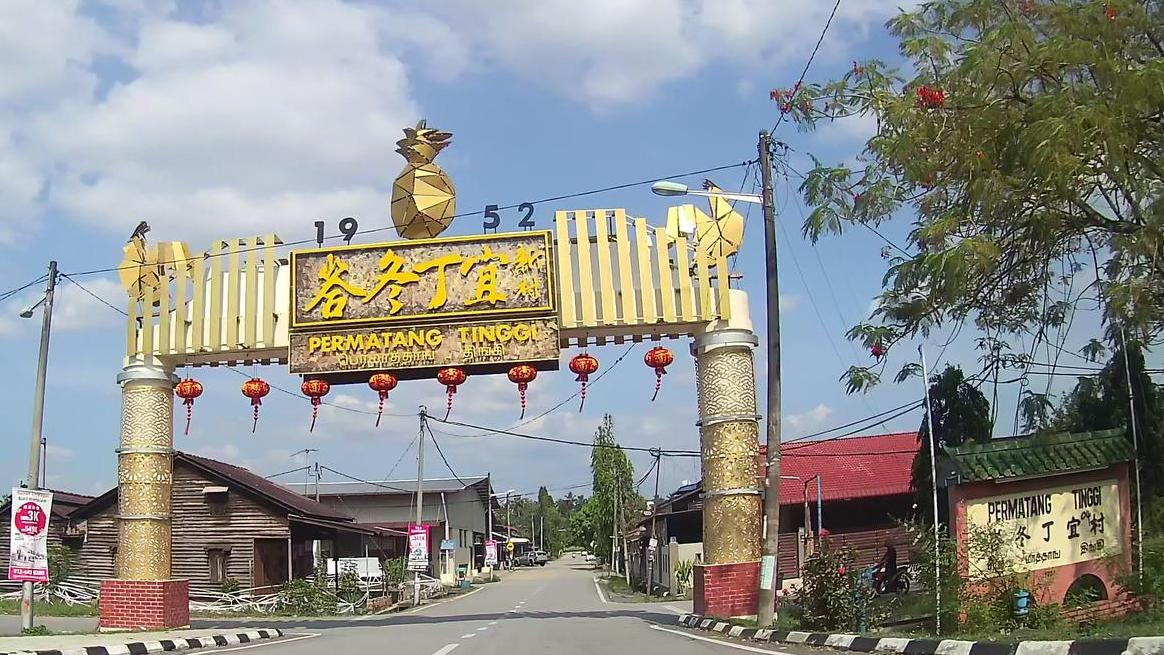
Permatang Tinggi

Permatang Tinggi is a village within the city of Seberang Perai in the Malaysian state of Penang. It is situated not far from Bukit Mertajam. It is also located a short distance from the Penang-Kuala Lumpur North-South Expressway (Bukit Tambun exit).
