= Augustin, Brașov =

Augustin
- Commune
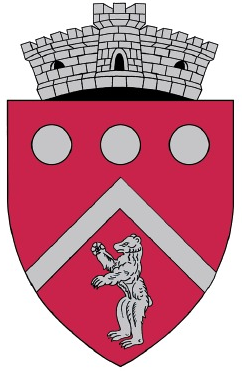
- Coat of arms

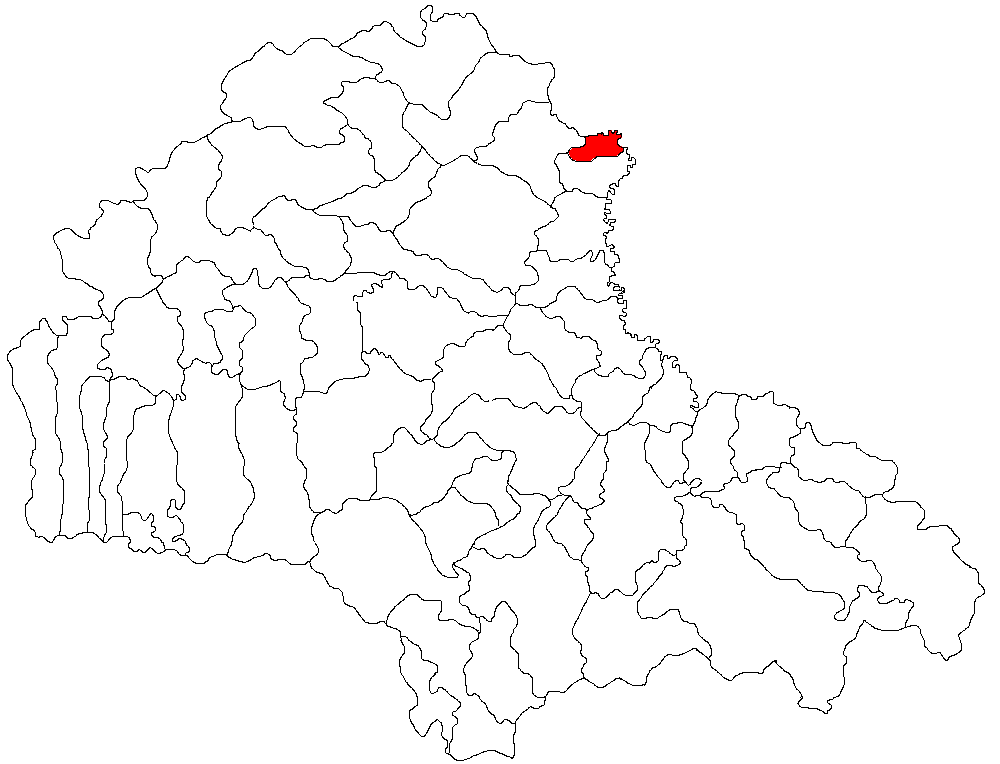
- Location in Brașov County

- Location in Romania
- Coordinates: 46°02′50″N 25°33′0″E
- Country: Romania
- County: Brașov

Government
  - Mayor (2020–2024): Sebastian Nicolae Porumb (PSD)
- Area: 12.18 km^{2} (4.70 sq mi)
- Elevation: 475 m (1,558 ft)
- Population (2021-12-01): 2,010
  - Density: 165/km^{2} (427/sq mi)
- Time zone: UTC+02:00 (EET)
  - Summer (DST): UTC+03:00 (EEST)
- Postal code: 507151
- Area code: +(40) x68
- Vehicle reg.: BV
- Website: www.primariaaugustin.ro

Augustin (German: Agestendorf; Hungarian: Ágostonfalva) is a commune in Brașov County, Transylvania, Romania. It is composed of a single village, Augustin. Formerly part of Ormeniș, it was split off in 2005 to form a separate commune.

The village is located at the northern edge of the county, on the border with Covasna County. It lies in the southern part of the Baraolt basin, on the left bank of the Olt River. Nestled at the foot of the Perșani Mountains, 475 m (1,558 ft) above sea level, it is 50 km (31 mi) away from Brașov, the county seat. The Augustin train station serves Main Line 300 of the CFR network, which connects Bucharest with the Hungarian border near Oradea.

Historical population
Year	Pop.	±%
1850	1,860	—
2002	1,490	−19.9%
2011	1,860	+24.8%
2021	2,010	+8.1%
Source: Census data

At the 2021 census, the commune had 2,010 inhabitants; of those, 73.3% were Roma and 25.3% Romanians.

In 2007, the Augustin hermitage for nuns was built on the spot known as Monastery Hill, after a monastery that used to be there, before being destroyed in 1760.

== See also ==
- Dacian fortress of Augustin
