= Erika F. Augustine =

American academic

- Education: Harvard University; University of Rochester Medical Center
- Known for: Studying neuronal ceroid lipofuscinoses and using telemedicine to provide remote care for rare diseases
- Awards: 2023 Recipient of the Sidney Carter Award in Neurology, 2017 A. B. Baker Teaching Recognition, 2013 Faculty Teaching Award
- Scientific career
- Fields: Neurology, pediatrics
- Workplaces: Kennedy Krueger Institute; University of Rochester Medical Center

Erika F. Augustine is an Associate Chief Science Officer and Director of the Clinical Trials Unit at Kennedy Krieger Institute. She was previously an Associate Professor of Neurology and Pediatrics at the University of Rochester Medical Center in Rochester, New York. Augustine co-directed the University of Rochester Batten Center, and was the associate director of both the Center for Health and Technology and the Udall Center of Excellence in Parkinson's Disease Research. Augustine's clinical research and medical practice specialize in pediatric movement disorders. She leads clinical trials for Batten diseases, a group of rare pediatric neurodegenerative disorders, and she has developed a novel telemedicine model to increase the efficacy of remote care for patients with rare diseases.

== Early life and education ==
Augustine pursued her undergraduate education at Harvard University. She majored in Biological Anthropology and graduated with a Bachelor of Arts in 1999. Following the completion of her undergraduate degree, she attended the University of Rochester for medical school. She obtained her MD in 2003, and then moved back to Boston to pursue her residency training at the Boston Children's Hospital. In 2008, she completed her residency training in Pediatrics and Child Neurology and then moved back to Rochester for her Fellowships. In 2009, she completed a fellowship in Experimental Therapeutics, and in 2010, she completed a fellowship in pediatric movement disorders. She then completed her Masters of Science in Translational Research at the University of Rochester in 2014.

== Career and research ==
In 2012, Augustine was appointed Assistant Professor of Neurology, Pediatrics, and the Center for Health and Technology at the University of Rochester Medical Center (URMC). In 2013, she became the Assistant Program Director for the Experimental Therapeutics of Neurological Disorders Fellowship and in 2015 she became the associate director of the Center for Health and Technology at URMC. In 2017, she was promoted to Associate Professor of Neurology, Pediatrics, and the Center for Human Experimental Therapeutics. In 2018, URMC was selected by the National Institutes of Health to house the Morris K. Udall Center of Excellence in Parkinson's Disease Research and Augustine became a member of the executive committee, specifically the associate director of the center, where she serves as a principal investigator on FDA funded clinical trials.

Outside of URMC, Augustine is a member of the National Institutes of Health Taskforce on Childhood Motor Disorders. She also bridges translational research with the clinic by working as a consultant to the Food and Drug Administration Neurological Devices Panel to expedite the use of informative wearable technologies in gathering data in patients with neurological diseases to track disease and recovery. She is also the Diversity Officer for the new NIH based Child Neurologist Career Development Program K12 (CNCD-K12) where she reviews applications of clinician-scientists to receive funding. She also organizes and oversees the Minority Research Scholars Program through the CNCDP-K12 which provides travels awards to individuals to attend the Neurobiology of Disease in Children Symposium and the Child Neurology Society Annual Meeting. In addition, Augustine is the Chair of the Scientific Program Committee for planning the Child Neurology Symposium. Augustine is also a member of NeuroNEXT, a network distributed across institutions and funded by the National Institutes of Neurological Disorders to focus on expediting the development of therapies for neurological disorders. Augustine has been featured on several media platforms such as WXXINews to discuss her research on rare neurological diseases and she has also been a panelist on Second Opinion TV.

=== Novel treatments for rare neurological Diseases ===
Since rare and orphan diseases are highly understudied and patients with these diseases face very few, if any, treatments or cures, Augustine has dedicated much of for clinical research to understanding these diseases and develop therapies to treat them. She focuses on neuronal ceroid lipofuscinoses (NCLs) or Batten diseases, which are a group of rare pediatric neurodegenerative disorders showing symptoms similar to dementia and parkinsons, often with blindness, seizures, and motor impairment. Her work has helped to elucidate the distinct characteristics of juvenile NCLs, in that they do not show myoclonic seizures to the same extent as other subsets of NCLs. Augustine has also begun to pilot studies of remote assessment of disease symptoms and progression through audiovisual technological assessment of neuropsychological symptoms. This work is critical since patients often have to travel from far distances to seek specialized treatment for NCLs, so remote data and disease monitoring would greatly enhance the quality of care and treatment. After characterizing the disorder and exploring ways to track disease progress, Augustine has taken steps towards elucidating pharmacological compounds to better target disease causes and treat symptoms in NCL patients. Data shows that inflammation and autoimmunity are characteristic of NCLs, so Augustine tested mycophenolate on patients with NCL, an immunosuppressant, to first see how short term administration was tolerated. She found that immunosuppression through mycophenolate was well tolerated in patients and they are now moving on to long term clinical trials to test the efficacy in reducing NCL symptoms.

=== Remote rare disease monitoring ===
Since remote disease monitoring is critical to effectively treating patients with rare disorders, who often do not live close to specialized clinic where they seek treatment and health management, Augustine has been exploring novel ways to best provide remote care to these patients. She has explored how telemedicine performs as a means of administering the Unified Batten Disease Rating Scale (UBDRS) Physical Impairment subscale to assess disease severity. Using live video, patients are assessed by trained examiners, and they found that this method works well to diagnose disease severity in patients with Batten Diseases. Following up on this work, Augustine and her colleagues have developed a revised model for care for rare diseases, since the patient population and needs are different from common diseases where local care delivery is much more feasible. Her model includes the use of telehealth to remove geographic barriers to healthcare access while also enhancing for data collection and patient-provider-researcher communication.

=== Sex differences in neurological disease ===
Augustine's research has also explored sex differences in neurological diseases. Anecdotal evidence from parents had suggested that females experience increased severity of Batten Disease symptoms, so Augustine sought to explore this further. She found that Females, on average, had later disease onset and earlier death in addition to an earlier loss in functional capability. Augustine has also explored sex differences in Parkinson's Disease. She has found that, overall, men and women do not exhibit differences in clinical motor impairment in the early course of the disease. She did observe differences in non-motor symptoms such as cognition, depression, and sleep disturbances.

== Awards and honors ==
- 1999 Dean's Fellowship Merit Scholarship, University of Rochester School of Medicine
- 2003 Alpha Omega Alpha, University of Rochester School of Medicine
- 2007 American Neurological Association Residents' Program Scholarship
- 2013 Faculty Teaching Award from the Department of Neurology at the University of Rochester Medical Center
- 2015 Early Career Reviewer Program National Institutes of Health
- 2017 A. B. Baker Teaching Recognition, American Academy of Neurology
- 2018 Robert J. Joynt Endowed Professorship in Experimental Therapeutics of Neurology

== Select publications ==
- Adams HR, Defendorf S, Vierhile A, Mink JW, Marshall FJ, Augustine EF. A novel, hybrid, single- and multi-site clinical trial design for CLN3 disease, an ultra-rare lysosomal storage disorder. Clin Trials. 2019;16(5):555‐560. doi:10.1177/1740774519855715
- Augustine EF, Beck CA, Adams HR, et al. Short-Term Administration of Mycophenolate Is Well-Tolerated in CLN3 Disease (Juvenile Neuronal Ceroid Lipofuscinosis). JIMD Rep. 2019;43:117‐124. doi:10.1007/8904_2018_113
- Augustine EF, Adams HR, Bitsko RH, et al. Design of a Multisite Study Assessing the Impact of Tic Disorders on Individuals, Families, and Communities. Pediatr Neurol. 2017;68:49‐58.e3. doi:10.1016/j.pediatrneurol.2016.10.017
- Papandreou A, Schneider RB, Augustine EF, et al. Delineation of the movement disorders associated with FOXG1 mutations. Neurology. 2016;86(19):1794‐1800. doi:10.1212/WNL.0000000000002585
- Augustine EF, Pérez A, Dhall R, et al. Sex Differences in Clinical Features of Early, Treated Parkinson's Disease. PLOS One. 2015;10(7):e0133002. Published 2015 Jul 14. doi:10.1371/journal.pone.0133002
- Augustine EF, Adams HR, Beck CA, et al. Standardized assessment of seizures in patients with juvenile neuronal ceroid lipofuscinosis. Dev Med Child Neurol. 2015;57(4):366‐371. doi:10.1111/dmcn.12634
- Augustine EF, Adams HR, Mink JW. Clinical trials in rare disease: challenges and opportunities. J Child Neurol. 2013;28(9):1142‐1150. doi:10.1177/0883073813495959
- Statland JM, Griggs RC, Augustine EF. Emerging subspecialties in neurology: fellowship in experimental therapeutics of neurologic disease. Neurology. 2012;79(13):e106‐e108. doi:10.1212/WNL.0b013e31826c19b4
- Cialone J, Adams H, Augustine EF, et al. Females experience a more severe disease course in Batten disease [published correction appears in J Inherit Metab Dis. 2012 May;35(3):559]. J Inherit Metab Dis. 2012;35(3):549‐555. doi:10.1007/s10545-011-9421-6
- Cialone J, Augustine EF, Newhouse N, Vierhile A, Marshall FJ, Mink JW. Quantitative telemedicine ratings in Batten disease: implications for rare disease research. Neurology. 2011;77(20):1808‐1811. doi:10.1212/WNL.0b013e3182377e29
