= Augustino =

Augustino is a masculine given name. Notable people with the name include:

- Augustino de Cazalla (1510–1559), Spanish clergyman
- Augustino Jadalla Wani, South Sudanese politician
- Augustino Marial, Sudanese boxer
- Augustino Masele (born 1966), Tanzanian politician
- Augustino Mrema (1944–2022), Tanzanian politician
- Augustino Oldoini (1612–1683), Italian Jesuit teacher, church historian and bibliographer
- Augustino Ramadhani (1945–2020), Tanzanian jurist and Christian leader

== See also ==
- Augustinos Kapodistrias (1778–1857), Greek soldier and politician
- Agostino (disambiguation)
- Augustine (disambiguation)
- Agustini
- Augustina
