= Augustini =

Augustini may refer to:

- Augustine of Hippo (354–430), Christian theologian
- Jan Augustini (1725–1773), Dutch painter
- Oliver Augustini (born 1990), Slovak football player
