= Augustin Aubert =

French painter

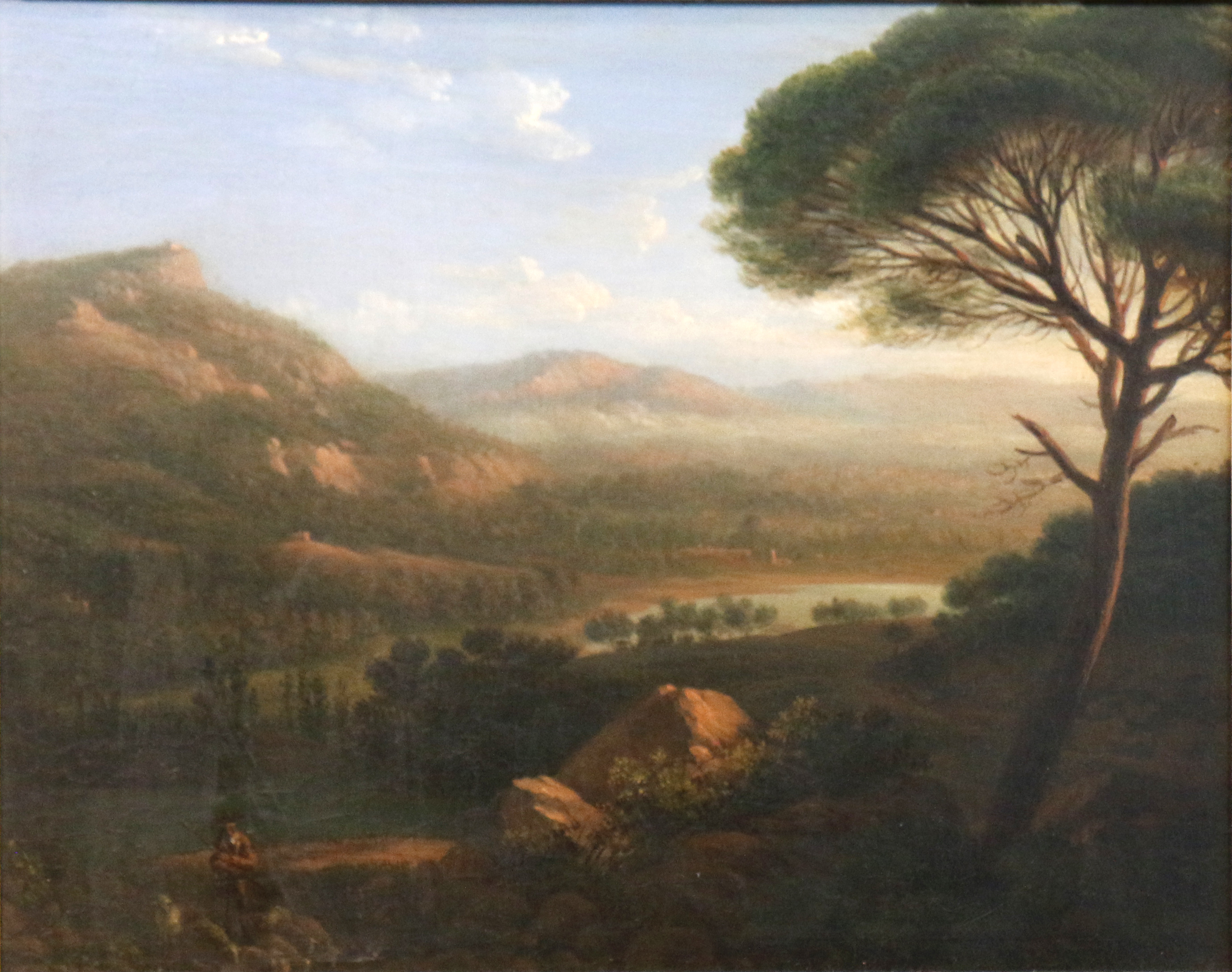
The Environs of Montredon

Augustin Raymond Aubert (1781–1857) was a French painter.

== Biography ==
He was born in 1781 in Marseille. He studied at first under Joachim Guenin, and subsequently with Pierre Peyron, in Paris, where he had moved in 1802. He returned to Marseille shortly after.

In 1810, he was made Director of the School of Design in Marseille, and in that capacity directed the studies of numerous pupils who afterwards became celebrated. He painted history, landscape, and portrait subjects with much success. The museum and churches of his native town possess several good examples of his art. Some of his main paintings, taken from sacred history, are of large dimensions.

He died on his estate near Marseille in 1857.
