= Augustus (given name) =

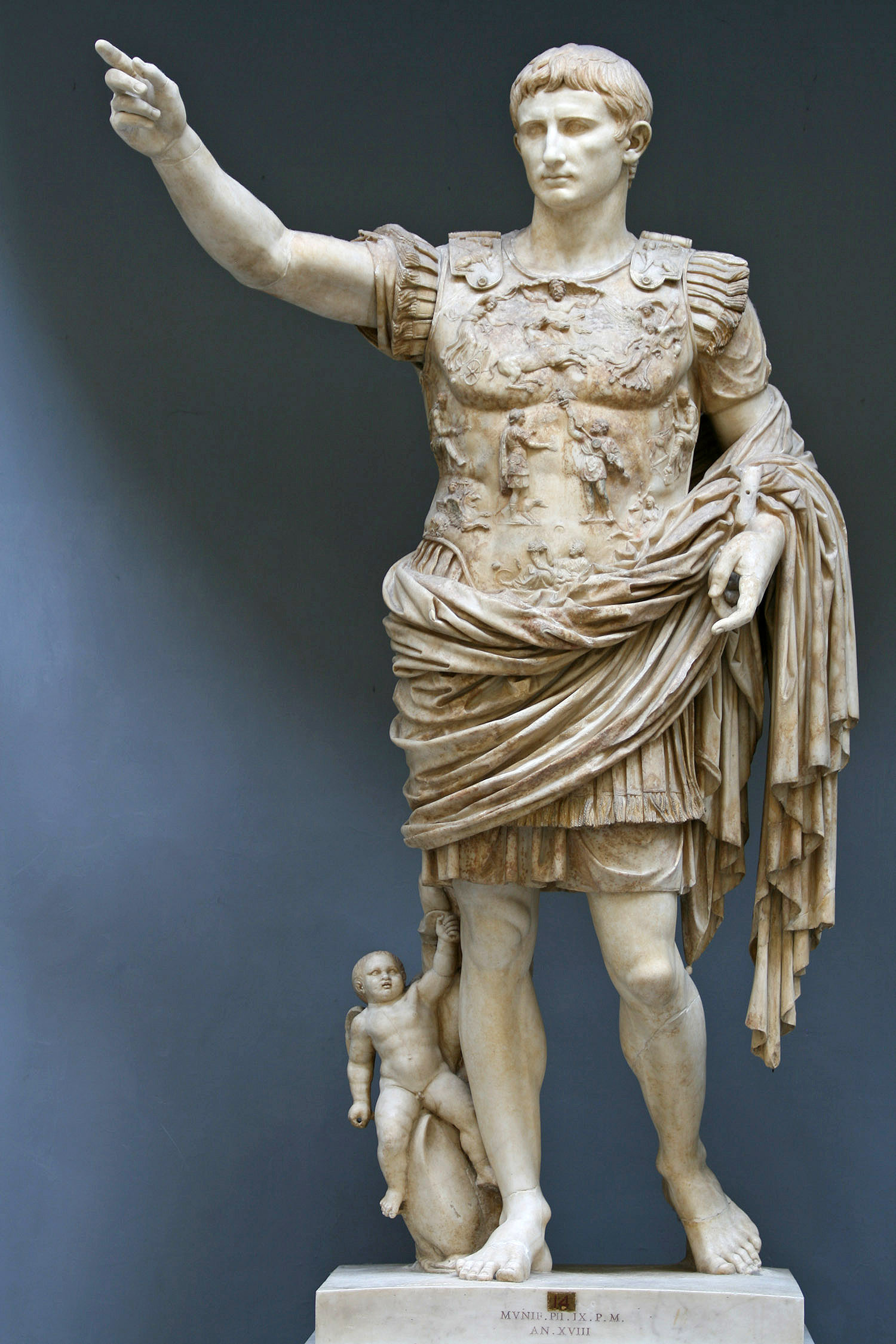
- Emperor Augustus
- Pronunciation: English: /ɔːˈɡʌstəs/ aw-GUST-əs; Dutch: [ʌuˈɣʏstəs] Classical Latin: [au̯ˈɡʊstʊs]
- Gender: Male
- Language: Latin, English, Dutch, German

Origin
- Meaning: "Venerable"

Other names
- See also: August, Augusto, Gus, Austin, Augustine, Agustin, Sebastian

Augustus is a masculine given name derived from Augustus, meaning "majestic," "the increaser," or "venerable". Many of its descended forms are August, Augusto, Auguste, Austin, Agustin and Augustine. The Greek translation of the title Augustus was Sebastos, from which the name Sebastian descends.

== People named Augustus ==
=== By first name or title ===
- Augustus (63 BC–14 AD), ancient Rome's first emperor
  - Many other Roman emperors who bore this title
- Augustus II the Strong (1670–1733), German King of Poland and Elector of Saxony
- Augustus III of Poland (1696–1763), German King of Poland and Elector of Saxony
- Augustus, Duke of Saxe-Gotha-Altenburg (1772–1822), German duke
- Augustus, Duke of Saxe-Lauenburg (1577–1656), German duke
- Augustus, Duke of Saxe-Weissenfels (1614–1680), German duke
- Augustus, Duke of Schleswig-Holstein-Sonderburg-Norburg-Plön (1635–1699), German duke
- Augustus, Elector of Saxony (1526–1586), German prince
- Augustus of Brunswick-Lüneburg, several people
- Augustus Abbott (1804–1867), British East India Company Army officer
- Augustus Huggins Abernathy (1838–1884), American physician
- Augustus Agar (1890–1968), British Royal Navy officer
- Augustus Aikhomu (1939–2011), Nigerian Navy officer
- Augustus Akinloye (1916–2007), Nigerian lawyer and politician
- Augustus Akiwumi (1891–1985), Nigerian-born Ghanaian politician, banker, judge, and scientist
- Augustus Alden (1837–1886), American politician
- Augustus Allen, several people
- Augustus Allhusen (1867–1925), English politician
- Augustus Alt (1731–1815), British soldier and Australian surveyor
- Augustus Anson (1835–1877), British Army personnel and Victoria Cross recipient
- Augustus Anwyl-Passingham (1880–1955), British soldier, recruiting officer, and Territorial Army organizer
- Augustus Applegath (1788–1871), English printer and inventor
- Augustus Arkwright (1821–1887), British Royal Navy officer and politician
- Augustus Armstrong (1833–1873), American lawyer and politician
- Augustus O. Bacon (1839–1914), American politician, Confederate soldier, and segregationist
- Augustus Baillie (1861–1939), Scottish businessman and British Army officer
- Augustus Baldwin, several people
- Augustus Bampfylde, 2nd Baron Poltimore (1837–1908), British politician
- Augustus Barber (1927–2008), American businessman
- Augustus Barrows (1838–1885), American lumberman, rancher, and pioneer settler
- Augustus Barry (1840–1871), Irish soldier
- Augustus Bartholomew (1882–1933), British librarian
- Augustus Bateman (1839–1922), English cricketer
- Augustus Beeby (1889–1974), English professional footballer
- Augustus Beekman (1923–2008), American fire commissioner
- Augustus Belknap (1841–1889), American Union Army officer and railway executive
- Augustus Bennet (1897–1983), American politician
- Augustus Berkeley, 4th Earl of Berkeley (1715–1755), son of Vice-Admiral James Berkeley, 3rd Earl of Berkeley, and the former Lady Louisa Lennox
- Augustus Bickley (1857–1902), English journalist and author
- Augustus Bird (1802–1870), American pioneer and politician
- Augustus Blocksom (1854–1931), American Army officer
- Augustus Bourn (1834–1925), American politician
- Augustus Bouvier (1827–1881), French-born English painter
- Augustus Bove (died 1967), American politician
- Augustus Bowie Jr. (1872–1955), American inventor, businessman, and electrical engineer
- Augustus Bradford (1806–1881), American governor
- Augustus Brandegee (1828–1904), American lawyer and politician
- Augustus Bridle (1868–1952), Canadian journalist and author
- Augustus Brine (1769–1840), English Naval officer
- Augustus Buchel (1813–1864), German-born American military officer
- Augustus Buckland (1857–1942), British divine and writer
- Augustus Buell (1847–1904), American author
- Augustus Burbank (1823–1895), American physician
- Augustus Burke (1838–1891), Irish artist
- Augustus Caine (died 2005), Liberian academic and bureaucrat
- Augustus Carney (1870–1920), Irish-born American actor
- Augustus Case (1812–1893), American Naval officer
- Augustus Cavendish-Bradshaw (1768–1832), English politician
- Augustus Chase (1828–1896), American industrialist
- Augustus Chapman (1805–1876), American politician and lawyer
- Augustus Chetlain (1824–1914), American Army soldier
- Augustus Clark (1862–1928), English cricketer
- Augustus Dayton Clark (died 1990), American Naval officer
- Augustus Clevland (1754–1784), East India Company administrator, revenue collector, and judge
- Augustus Clifford (1788–1877), British Royal Navy 1st Baronet, MP
- Augustus Clissold (c. 1797–1882), English Anglican priest
- Augustus Constantine (1898–1976), American architect
- Augustus Cootmans, Belgian gymnast in the 1920s
- Augustus Corliss (1837–1908), American author and historian
- Augustus Crail (1842–1924), American pioneer, homesteader, cattle rancher, wheat strain developer, and politician
- Augustus Cutler (1827–1897), American politician
- Augustus Daniel (1866–1950), British curator and art museum director
- Augustus Davis (1835–1899), American Union Army officer
- Augustus de Bourbel (1835–1917), English cricketer
- Augustus De Butts (1770–1853), British Army officer
- Augustus Decker (1813–1872), American politician
- Augustus De Morgan (1806–1871), British mathematician and logician
- Augustus d'Este (1794–1848), British first known multiple sclerosis patient
- Augustus de Vaudricourt, French 19th-century painter and lithographer
- Augustus Dickens (1827–1866), English journalist and Charles Dickens’ brother
- Augustus Dill (1882–1956), American historian, activist, social worker, sociologist, and writer
- Augustus Dodge (1812–1883), American politician
- Augustus Dole (1816–1876), American businessman and optician
- Augustus Drum (1815–1858), American politician and lawyer
- Augustus Dumbar (born 1978), Liberian former footballer
- Augustus Dunbier (1888–1977), American painter
- Augustus Duncombe (1814–1880), English Anglican priest
- Augustus Earle (1793–1838), British painter
- Augustus Egg (1816–1863), British painter
- Augustus Endicott (1818–1910), American legislator and sheriff
- Augustus Ellis (1800–1841), British Army officer and Tory politician
- Augustus Elwood (1819–1881), American merchant and politician
- Augustus Everaerts (born 1929), Belgian former wrestler
- Augustus Farnham (1805–1865), American architect and Mormon missionary
- Augustus Fechteler (1857–1921), American Naval officer
- Augustus Fendler (1813–1883), Prussian-born American natural history collector
- Augustus Finkelnburg (1830–1889), German American immigrant, lawyer, politician, and pioneer
- Augustus H. Fenn (1844–1897), justice of the Connecticut Supreme Court
- Augustus FitzGeorge (1847–1933), British Army officer
- Augustus FitzGerald, 3rd Duke of Leinster (1791–1874), Anglo-Irish peer and freemason
- Augustus FitzRoy, several people
- Augustus Ford (1858–1931), English first-class cricketer
- Augustus Forsberg (1832–1910), Swedish military engineer
- Augustus Foster (1780–1848), British diplomat and politician
- Augustus Ge, American professional pickleball player
- Augustus Fox (1822–1895), English portrait painter
- Augustus Frank (1826–1895), American merchant, railroad executive, banker, and politician
- Augustus Fraser (died 1890), Australian politician and pastoralist
- Augustus Frazer (1776–1835), British Army officer
- Augustus Christian Frederick, Duke of Anhalt-Köthen (1769–1812), German prince
- Augustus French (1808–1864), American attorney and politician
- Augustus Fritsch (1866–1933), Australian architect
- Augustus Fuller, several people
- Augustus P. Gardner (1865–1918), American military officer and politician
- Augustus H. Garland (1832–1899), American lawyer and politician
- Augustus Garrett (1801–1848), American politician
- Augustus Gearhard (1893–1974), American Air Force brigadier general and Roman Catholic priest
- Augustus George (1817–1902), English cricketer
- Augustus George, Margrave of Baden-Baden (1706–1771), German Roman Catholic monarch and military personnel
- Augustus Gilchrist (born 1989), American professional basketball player
- Augustus Godson (1835–1906), British politician
- Augustus Goessling (1878–1963), American water polo player and swimmer
- Augustus Goetz (1904–1976), American rower
- Augustus Goodridge (1839–1920), Newfoundland merchant and politician
- Augustus Gough-Calthorpe, 6th Baron Calthorpe (1829–1910), British agriculturist and philanthropist
- Augustus Gould (1805–1866), American conchologist and malacologist
- Augustus Granville (1783–1872), Italian physician, writer, and patriot
- Augustus Greeves (1806–1874), Australian politician
- Augustus Gregoire (1936–1972), Dominican cricketer
- Augustus Gregory (1819–1905), English-born Australian explorer and surveyor
- Augustus Greulich (1813–1893), German-born American politician
- Augustus Griffin (1883–1946), American-born Canadian horticulture pioneer
- Augustus Radcliffe Grote (1841–1903), British entomologist
- Augustus C. Gurnee (1855–1926), American socialite and art patron
- Augustus M. Gurney (1895–1967), American Army officer
- Augustus Hall (1814–1861), American lawyer and politician
- Augustus Hamilton (1853–1913), New Zealand ethnologist, biologist, and museum director
- Augustus Hand, several people
- Augustus Noble Hand (1869–1954), American judge
- Augustus George Vernon Harcourt (1834–1919), English chemist
- Augustus A. Hardenbergh (1830–1889), American politician
- Augustus Hare (1834–1903), English writer and raconteur
- Augustus Harris (1852–1896), British actor, impresario, and dramatist
- Augustus Glossop Harris (1825–1873), British actor and theatre manager
- Augustus L. Hart (1849–1901), American politician and jurist
- Augustus P. Hascall (1800–1872), American politician, surveyor, lawyer, and judge
- Augustus Hawkins (1907–2007), American politician
- Augustus George Hazard (1802–1868), American businessman and gunpowder manufacturer
- Augustus Helder (1827–1906), British solicitor and politician
- Augustus Hemenway (1853–1931), American philanthropist and public servant
- Augustus Hemming (1841–1907), British colonial administrator, governor, and cricketer
- Augustus Moore Herring (1867–1926), American aviation pioneer
- Augustus Hervey, 3rd Earl of Bristol (1724–1779), English Royal Navy officer and politician
- Lord Augustus Hervey (1837–1875), British politician
- Augustus Hewitt-Fox (1884–1959), South African cricketer
- Augustus High (1844–1927), American politician
- Augustus Hill (British Army officer) (1853–1921), British Army officer
- Augustus Charles Hobart-Hampden (1822–1886), English-born Ottoman admiral
- Augustus M. Hodges (1854–1916), American journalist, newspaper editor, poet, and political organizer
- Augustus Holland (1824–1919), Canadian farmer and politician
- Augustus W. Holton (1850–1911), American architect
- Augustus Hooper (1814–1866), English-born Canadian merchant, timber dealer, and political figure
- Augustus Hopkins Strong (1836–1921), American Baptist minister and theologian
- Augustus Hopper (1816–1878), English Anglican priest
- Augustus Hoppin (1828–1896), American book illustrator
- Augustus Hotham (died 1896), Australian cricketer
- Augustus P. Hunton (1816–1911), American lawyer and politician
- Augustus Daniel Imms (1880–1949), English educator, research administrator, and entomologist
- Augustus Sol Invictus (born 1983), American political activist, attorney, blogger, and white nationalist
- Augustus Jackson (1808–1852), American confectioner, chef, and businessman
- Augustus James (1866–1934), Australian politician
- Augustus Jaspert (born 1979), British diplomat
- Augustus Jay (1850–1919), American diplomat
- Augustus Jessopp (1823–1914), English cleric and writer
- Augustus John (1878–1961), Welsh painter, draughtsman, and etcher
- Augustus S. Johnson, American politician
- Augustus Jones (c. 1757–1836), American-born Canadian farmer, land speculator, magistrate, militia captain, and surveyor
- Augustus D. Juilliard (1836–1919), American businessman and philanthropist
- Augustus Kargbo (born 1999), Sierra Leonean professional footballer
- Augustus Mbusya Kavutu (born 1977), Kenyan long-distance runner and marathoner
- Augustus Henry Keane (1833–1912), Irish Roman Catholic journalist and linguist
- Augustus M. Kelley (1913–1999), American book publisher
- Augustus Holmes Kenan (1805–1870), American politician and signer of the Confederate Constitution
- Augustus Kenderdine (1870–1947), English-born Canadian artist and farmer
- Augustus Keppel, several people
- Augustus Kilty (1807–1879), American Civil War Navy officer
- Augustus C. Kinney (1845–1908), American physician and scientist
- Augustus Braun Kinzel (1900–1987), American metallurgist and engineer
- Augustus Frederic Christopher Kollmann (1756–1829), German-born British composer and musical theorist
- Augustus Kountze (1826–1892), American businessman
- Augustus Koranteng Kyei (born 1990), Ghanaian blogger, freelance journalist, publicist, philanthropist, and digital marketer
- Augustus Kuper (1809–1885), British Royal Navy officer of German descent
- Augustus Osborne Lamplough (1877–1930), English Orientalist painter and illustrator
- Augustus Laver (1834–1898), Canadian architect
- Augustus Lawson (1930–?), Ghanaian sprinter
- Augustus Legge (1839–1913), English bishop
- Augustus Legge (archdeacon of Winchester) (1773–1828), English archdeacon
- Augustus Austen Leigh (1840–1905), English provost
- Augustus Asplet Le Gros (1840–1877), American poet and writer
- Augustus Le Plongeon (1825–1908), British-American archeologist and photographer
- Augustus Leveson-Gower (1782–1802), English Royal Navy soldier
- Prince Augustus Frederick, Duke of Sussex (1773–1843), English duke and George III's son
- Augustus Frederick Lindley (1840–1873), British Royal Navy officer, adventurer, and writer
- Prince Augustus Ferdinand of Prussia (1730–1813), Prussian prince and general
- Augustus Lochner (1827–1865), English soldier and cricketer
- Lord Augustus Loftus (1817–1904), British-Australian diplomat and colonial administrator
- Augustus Long (1904–2001), American businessman and Navy personnel
- Augustus V. Long (1877–1955), American district judge
- Augustus Nicodemus Lopes, Brazilian Christian theologian and minister
- Augustus Louis, Prince of Anhalt-Köthen (1697–1755), German prince
- Augustus Edward Hough Love (1863–1940), English mathematician
- Augustus Lowell (1830–1900), American industrialist, philanthropist, horticulturist, and civic leader
- Augustus Lucanus (1848–1941), Australian police officer and businessman
- Augustus Ludlow (1792–1813), American Naval officer
- Augustus Lunn (1905–1986), British artist and art teacher
- Augustus Nathaniel Lushington (1869–1939), Trinidad-born American veterinarian
- Augustus Macdonald (1804–1862), British politician and writer
- Augustus Rodney Macdonough (1820–1907), American lawyer, newspaper editor, and railroad secretary
- Augustus Magee (1789–1813), American Army soldier
- Augustus Maiyo (born 1983), Kenyan-born American long-distance runner
- Augustus Raymond Margary (1846–1875), British diplomat and explorer
- Augustus Martin, several people
- Augustus Matthiessen (1831–1870), British chemist and physicist
- Augustus Maxwell (1820–1903), American lawyer and politician
- Augustus Mayhew (1826–1875), English journalist and author
- Augustus McCloskey (1878–1950), American lawyer and judge
- Augustus Gardner Means (1925–1994), American businessman and politician
- Augustus Meredith Nanton (1860–1925), Canadian businessman, investor, and developer
- Augustus Merriman-Labor (1877–1919), Sierra Leonean barrister, writer, and munitions worker
- Augustus Summerfield Merrimon (1830–1892), American senator, lawyer, and judge
- Augustus Meyers (1841–1919), American Civil War soldier
- Augustus S. Miller (1847–1905), American mayor, lawyer, and politician
- Augustus Mongredien (1807–1888), British corn merchant, political economist, writer, and chess master
- Augustus Morris (1820–1895), Australian politician
- Augustus Newbold Morris (1838–1906), American hospital manager, animal care director, and bank vice-president
- Augustus Moulton (born 1959), Liberian sprinter
- Augustus Henry Mounsey (1834–1882), British diplomat
- Augustus Müller (1841–1910), German-born Indian Roman Catholic priest and missionary
- Augustus Edwin Mulready (1844–1904), English genre painter
- Augustus Nepean (1849–1933), English cricketer
- Augustus Neville, New Zealand-born Australian actor
- Augustus Charles Newman (1904–1972), British Army officer
- Augustus Norton, several people
- Augustus Richard Norton (1946–2019), American professor and army officer
- Augustus Henry Novelli (died 1887), English physician
- Augustus Nuwagaba (born 1964), Ugandan international economic transformation consultant
- Augustus Oga (born 1960), Kenyan boxer
- Augustus Frederick Oldfield (1821–1887), English botanist and zoologist
- Augustus Oldford (1925–2023), Canadian social worker, magistrate, and politician
- Augustus Orlebar (1897–1943), British military officer
- Augustus Orlebar (cricketer) (1824–1912), English first-class cricketer and clergyman
- Augustus Pablo (1953–1999), Jamaican roots reggae and dub record producer and a multi-instrumentalist
- Augustus Page (1855–1898), New Zealand cricketer
- Augustus Paget (1823–1896), British diplomat
- Augustus Paget (RAF officer) (1898–1918), British World War I flying ace
- Augustus G. Paine Jr. (1866–1947), American paper manufacturer and bank official
- Augustus G. Paine Sr. (1839–1915), American financier
- Augustus Parrish (born 1987), American former football player
- Augustus Paulet, 15th Marquess of Winchester (1858–1899), British peer and soldier
- Augustus Peirce (1840–1919), American sailor, actor, raconteur, and artist
- Augustus L. Perrill (1807–1882), American educator, law enforcement officer, and politician
- Augustus Peters (1931–1986), German clergyman and Roman Catholic bishop
- Augustus W. Peters (1844–1898), Canadian-born American politician and lawyer
- Augustus Herman Pettibone (1835–1918), American politician
- Augustus Phillimore (1822–1897), English Royal Navy officer
- Augustus Phillips (1874–1944), American actor
- Augustus Pierce (c. 1877–1934), American politician
- Augustus Pleasonton (1808–1894), American Civil War military general
- Augustus Poeppel (1839–1891), German-born Australian surveyor and explorer
- Augustus Pope, several people
- Augustus Porter (1769–1849), American businessman, judge, farmer, and politician
- Augustus Post (1873–1952), American adventurer, automotive pioneer, balloonist, early aviator, writer, actor, musician, and lecturer
- Augustus Prevost (1837–1913), British banker, businessman, and baronet
- Augustus Prew (born 1987), English film and television actor
- Augustus Prinsep (1803–1830), English artist, writer, and civil servant
- Augustus Pugin (1812–1852), English architect, designer, artist, and critic
- Augustus Charles Pugin (1762–1832), Anglo-French artist, architectural draughtsman, and writer
- Augustus Quirinus Rivinus (1652–1723), German physician and botanist
- Augustus Rauschenbusch (1816–1899), German Baptist clergyman
- Augustus M. Reinhardt (1842–1923), American businessman
- Augustus Rhodes (1821–1918), American judge, lawyer, and senator
- Augustus Ricardo (1843–1871), English cricketer
- Augustus J. Ricks (1843–1906), American judge
- Augustus Pitt Rivers (1827–1900), English officer in the British Army, ethnologist, and archaeologist
- Augustus Roberts, Canadian politician
- Augustus I. Robbins (1839–1909), American Union Army soldier
- Augustus Robin, American engraver and businessman
- Augustus Rowe (1920–2013), Canadian physician and politician
- Augustus John Rush (born 1942), American psychiatrist
- Augustus M. Ryon (1862–1949), American mining engineer
- Augustus Saint-Gaudens (1848–1907), American sculptor
- Augustus Saunders (1801–1878), British school headmaster
- Augustus Saunders (baseball) (1909–1999), American professional baseball player
- Augustus Schell (1812–1884), American politician and lawyer
- Augustus Schoonmaker Jr. (1828–1894), American lawyer and politician
- Augustus Schutz (1689–?), English courtier of German descent
- Augustus Schwaab (1823–1899), German-American architect and civil engineer
- Augustus John Schwertner (1870–1939), American Roman Catholic bishop of German descent
- Augustus Sclafani (died 1986), American gangster of Italian descent
- Augustus Frederic Scott (1854–1936), Norwich-based architect
- Augustus Henry Seward (1826–1876), American Army soldier
- Augustus Seymour, several people
- Augustus Shapleigh (1810–1902), American businessman and pioneer
- Augustus Shears (1827–1911), English Anglican priest
- Augustus Burke Shepherd (1839–1885), English medical doctor
- Augustus Frederick Sherman (1865–1925), American clerical administrator and photographer
- Augustus Short (1802–1883), Australian bishop
- Augustus Siebe (1788–1872), German-born British engineer
- Augustus Constantine Sinclair (c. 1834–1891), Jamaican civil servant, historian, and non-fiction writer
- Augustus Smith, several people
- Augustus L. Smith (1833–1902), American educator, businessman, and politician
- Augustus Rhodes Sollers (1814–1862), American politician
- Augustus Soule (1827–1887), American lawyer and judge
- Augustus Spencer (1807–1893), British Army officer
- Augustus D. Splivalo (1840–1911), American attorney and politician of Italian descent
- Augustus B. R. Sprague (1827–1910), American businessman, politician, and military figure
- Augustus Stafford (1811–1857), British landowner and politician
- Augustus Owsley Stanley (1867–1958), American politician
- Augustus Stapleton (1800–1880), English biographer and political pamphleteer
- Augustus Steele (1792–1864), American entrepreneur, state legislator, judge, politician, postmaster, port inspector, and tax collector
- Augustus Stinchfield (1842–1917), American physician
- Augustus Stoneman (1832–1905), Canadian merchant and politician
- Augustus Russell Street (1792–1866), American philanthropist
- Augustus N. Summers (1856–1927), American lawyer, politician, and judge
- Augustus Vincent Tack (1870–1949), American painter
- Augustus Joseph Tancred (1804–1867), South African politician
- Augustus Obuadum Tanoh (born 1956), Ghanaian politician and international businessman
- Augustus Gabriel de Vivier Tassin (1842–1893), French-born American Civil War Union Army soldier
- Augustus Tennant (1841–1892), Indian-born New Zealand cricketer
- Augustus Thébaud (1807–1885), French-American educator and publicist
- Augustus Thomas (1857–1934), American playwright
- Augustus Thorndike (1896–1986), American sports physician
- Augustus Toebbe (1829–1884), German-born American Roman Catholic bishop
- Augustus Tolton (1854–1897), American Catholic priest
- Augustus Toplady (1740–1778), English Anglican cleric, hymn writer, animal rights scholar, and poet
- Augustus Edmonds Tozer (1857–1910), English composer and organist
- Augustus Trowbridge (1870–1934), American educator and physicist
- Augustus H. Tulk (1810–1873), Australian librarian and linguist
- Augustus Ulyard (1816–1900), American baker, council member, and politician
- Augustus Uthwatt, Baron Uthwatt (1879–1949), Australian-born British judge
- Augustus Van Dievoet (1803–1865), Belgian legal historian and Supreme Court advocate
- Augustus van Horne Ellis (1827–1863), American lawyer, sea captain, and soldier
- Augustus Van Pelt (1817–1889), American harbor pilot
- Augustus Van Wyck (1850–1922), American judge and politician
- Augustus Arthur Vansittart (1824–1882), English scholar
- Augustus Voelcker (1822–1884), German scientist and chemist
- Augustus Stephen Vogt (1861–1926), German-Canadian organist, choral conductor, music educator, composer, and author
- Augustus Wade Dwight (1827–1865), American Civil War officer and lawyer
- Augustus Walford Weedon (1838–1908), English landscape painter
- Augustus Wall Callcott (1779–1844), English painter
- Augustus Waller, several people
- Augustus Walley (1856–1938), American Army soldier
- Augustus Frederick Warr (1847–1908), English solicitor and politician
- Augustus Washington (c. 1820–1875), American photographer and daguerreotypist
- Augustus Weismann (1809–1884), American politician
- Augustus G. Weissert (1844–1923), American Civil War Union Army soldier
- Augustus West (1814–1887), American abolitionist, landowner, and activist
- Augustus West (priest) (1813–1893), Irish Anglican priest
- Augustus White (1839–?), New Zealand politician
- Augustus A. White (born 1936), American orthopedist, orthopedic surgeon, football player, and lacrosse player
- Augustus Samuel Wilkins (1843–1905), English classical scholar
- Augustus William, Duke of Brunswick-Wolfenbüttel (1662–1731), German prince
- Augustus William, Duke of Brunswick-Wolfenbüttel-Bevern (1715–1781), German military personnel
- Augustus William Hare (1792–1834), British writer
- Augustus William Harvey (1839–1903), British-born Canadian industrialist and politician
- Augustus William Lumley-Savile (1829–1887), English landowner and businessman
- Augustus William Smith (1802–1866), American educator, astronomer, and mathematician
- Augustus Williams (1842–?), American Civil War Navy soldier
- Augustus E. Willson (1846–1931), American politician
- Augustus B. Woodward (1774–1827), American politician of English-Dutch descent
- Augustus Wollaston Franks (1826–1897), British antiquarian and museum administrator
- Augustus B. Wolvin (1857–1932), American shipping magnate
- Augustus Romaldus Wright (1813–1891), American politician, lawyer, and Confederate States Army colonel
- Augustus Young (born 1943), Irish poet
- Augustus Young (representative) (1784–1857), American politician
- Arthur Augustus Zimmerman (1869–1936), American cycling sprint rider
- David Augustus Burke (1952–1987), American hijacker and former employee who caused the crash of Pacific Southwest Airlines Flight 1771
- Henry Augustus Lukeman (1872–1935), American sculptor
- W. Augustus Barratt (1873–1947), Scottish-born American songwriter and musician
- Prince William Augustus, Duke of Cumberland (1721–1765), German-British Army personnel and George II's son
- Joseph Augustus Zarelli (1953-1957), Boy in the box
- Augustus FitzRoy, 7th Duke of Grafton (1821-1912), British Army officer

== Fictional characters ==
- Augustus "Gusto" Gummi, a Gummi Bear artist from the Disney Afternoon animated series Adventures of the Gummi Bears
- Augustus Cole, a character from the Gears of War series
- Augustus Autumn, a colonel in Fallout 3's Enclave Faction.
- Augustus Faverhsam, a character from The Penny Dreadfuls Present...
- Augustus Gloop, a gluttonous character from Charlie and the Chocolate Factory
- Augustus Haynes, character on The Wire
- Lord Augustus Highcastle, a character from Augustus Does His Bit by George Bernard Shaw
- Augustus Hill, narrator and inmate on Oz
- Augustus Porter, also known as Gus, a character from the animated fantasy series The Owl House
- Augustus Sinclair, a guiding character from the video game BioShock 2
- Augustus Rookwood, a character from the Harry Potter series
- Augustus Snodgrass, a character in Charles Dickens's novel The Pickwick Papers
- Augustus Waters, a character from The Fault in Our Stars by John Green
- Augustus McCrae, a character from the novel Lonesome Dove by Larry McMurty.

== See also ==
- Arch of Augustus (disambiguation)
- August (name)
- Augusta (disambiguation)
- Augustine (disambiguation)
- Augustus
- Augustus (honorific)
- Temple of Augustus (disambiguation)
- Wars of Augustus
