= Augustus Johnson =

Augustus Johnson may refer to:

- Augustus S. Johnson, Michigan politician
- Gus Johnson (sportscaster) (Augustus Cornelius Johnson Jr., born 1967), American sportscaster
- J. Augustus Johnson, American consul in Beirut
