= Augustus Norton =

Augustus Norton may refer to:

- Augustus Richard Norton (1946–2019), American professor of international relations and anthropology
- Augustus Theodore Norton (1808–1884), American minister and author
- William Augustus Norton (1810–1883), American civil engineer
