= Augustus Allen =

Augustus Allen may refer to:

- Augustus Allen Hayes (1806–1882), American chemist
- Augustus Chapman Allen (1806–1864), American founder of the city of Houston, Texas
- Augustus F. Allen (1813–1875), American politician
- Augustus N. Allen (1868–1958), American architect
- Augustah Allen (1997-), African American Model
