= Augustus Theodore Norton =

American writer

Augustus Theodore Norton (March 28, 1808 – April 29, 1884) was an American minister and author.

Norton, only son of Theodore and Mary (Judd) Norton, was born in Cornwall, Connecticut, March 28, 1808.

He graduated from Yale College in 1832. After graduation, he was principal for two years of the academy in Catskill, New York, at the same time reading theology with the Rev. Thomas M. Smith. On April 1, 1835, he was ordained pastor of the Presbyterian Church in Windham, Greene County, New York; but his strong preference of the West as a field of labor led him to resign this pastorate after a few months, and remove to Illinois. He arrived at Naples, Illinois in October 1835, and after short engagements in that town, in Griggsville, in Pittsfield, and in St. Louis, he was called in February 1839, to the pastorate of the First Presbyterian Church in Alton, Illinois, and was installed there on May 9. This position he held for more than 19 years, the church flourishing greatly under his leadership. In May 1845, he originated, and for 23 years edited and published the Presbytery Reporter, a monthly magazine.

In September 1859, he was appointed District Secretary of Church Extension and Home Missions of the Presbyterian Church, for the West, and for a few months after this he resided in Chicago; but in the spring of 1881 he returned to Alton, where he continued until his death. After the union of the Old and New School Assemblies in 1870, the field of his secretaryship was limited to the Synod of Illinois South. He died, after a lingering illness, in Alton, April 29, 1884, at the age of 76.

His usefulness was especially marked in planting and nourishing churches in Central and Southern Illinois. The degree of Doctor of Divinity was conferred on him by Wabash College, Indiana, in 1868. He published in 1879 a History of the Presbyterian Church in Illinois (737 pp. 8vo).

He married, November 12, 1834, Eliza, daughter of Deacon Noah Rogers, of Cornwall. She survived him with two sons and two daughters.
