= Augustus Hand =

Augustus Hand may refer to:

- Augustus C. Hand (1803–1878), U.S. Congressman from New York, grandfather of Augustus Noble Hand
- Augustus Noble Hand (1869–1954), U.S. federal judge from New York, grandson of Augustus C. Hand
