= Augustus Caine =

Liberian academic and bureaucrat

Augustus F. Caine was a Liberian academic and bureaucrat during the 1960s and early 1970s.

== Life and career ==
After earning a doctorate in anthropology and sociology from Michigan State University in the United States, Caine became a Cabinet minister in 1965. After the resignation of John P. Mitchell from the position of Secretary of Education, Caine was appointed to be his successor by President Tubman, and he officially began his duties on 7 July. He held the office for almost five years, resigning in early February 1970. Caine attributed his resignation to personal reasons, but President Tubman spoke on 22 January of the existence of "trouble between me and Secretary Caine". Tubman made his statement amid the appearance of rumours on the previous day that he had asked for Caine's resignation in the wake of controversy among officials in the Monrovia Consolidated School System.

Caine died in Bethesda, Maryland on December 12, 2005.
