= Augusto =

Augusto is an Italian, Portuguese, and Spanish given name or surname. Derived from Augustus, meaning in Latin "majestic," "the increaser," or "venerable", it is notable as being the name of the first emperor of Ancient Rome. The Greek translation of the title Augustus was Sebastos, from which the name Sebastian descends.

== Given name ==
- Augusto Aníbal (1887–1965), Brazilian film actor and singer
- Augusto dos Anjos (1884–1914), Brazilian poet and professor
- Augusto Arbizo (born 1972), Philippine visual artist
- Augusto Antonio Barbera (born 1938), Italian law professor, politician and judge
- Augusto Benedico (1909–1992), Mexican actor
- Augusto Berns (1842–after 1888), German engineer and entrepreneur that rediscovered Machu Picchu
- Augusto Boal (1931–2009), Brazilian stage director, drama theorist and political activist
- Augusto de Campos (born 1931), Brazilian poet
- Augusto Fantozzi (1940–2019), Italian lawyer, tax expert, academic, businessman, politician and government minister
- Augusto Farfus (born 1983), Brazilian race car driver
- Augusto Fernández (born 1986), Argentine former footballer
- Augusto Fernández (motorcyclist) (born 1997), Spanish motorcycle racer
- Augusto Franqui (fl. 1904–1906), Cuban baseball player
- Augusto Genina (1892–1957), Italian pioneer film producer and director
- Augusto Inácio (born 1955), Portuguese former footballer and manager
- Augusto B. Leguía (1863–1932), Peruvian politician, twice President of Peru
- Augusto Leverger, Baron of Melgaço (1802–1880), French-Brazilian admiral, four times President of the province of Mato Grosso
- Augusto Monterroso (1921–2003), Honduran writer
- Augusto Odone (1933–2013), Italian economist who invented Lorenzo's oil to treat his son's disease
- Augusto Pérez Palacios (1909–2002), Mexican architect
- Augusto Pestana (politician) (1868–1934), Brazilian engineer and politician
- Augusto Pinochet (1915–2006), Chilean military officer and dictator of Chile
- Augusto Righi (1850–1920), Italian physicist
- Augusto Roa Bastos (1917–2005), Paraguayan novelist and short story writer
- Augusto César Sandino (1895–1934), Nicaraguan revolutionary leader
- Augusto Silj (1846–1926), Roman Catholic cardinal
- Augusto (footballer, born 1992), Brazilian football player Augusto Bruno da Silva
- Augusto Oliveira da Silva (born 1983), known as Augusto Recife, Brazilian footballer
- Augusto Vargas Alzamora (1922–2000), Roman Catholic cardinal priest and Archbishop of Lima
- Augusto de Vasconcelos (1867–1951), Portuguese surgeon, politician, diplomat and 57th Prime Minister of Portugal
- Augusto Vera (1813–1885), Italian philosopher

== Surname ==
- Bastien Augusto (born 1999), French runner
- Renato Augusto (1988) Brazilian footballer
- Renato Augusto (footballer, born 1990), Brazilian former footballer
- Renato Augusto (footballer, born 1992), Brazilian footballer

== See also ==
- August (name)
- Augustus (disambiguation)
- Agosto (disambiguation)
- Auguste
