= Augustus of Brunswick-Lüneburg =

Augustus of Brunswick-Lüneburg may refer to:

- Augustus the Elder, Duke of Brunswick-Lüneburg (1568–1636), also called Augustus I
- Augustus the Younger, Duke of Brunswick-Lüneburg (1579–1666), also called Augustus II
- Augustus William, Duke of Brunswick-Wolfenbüttel (1662–1731)
- Augustus William, Duke of Brunswick-Bevern (1715–1781)
- William Augustus, Duke of Brunswick-Harburg (1564–1642)
- Rudolph Augustus, Duke of Brunswick-Wolfenbüttel (1627–1704)
- Ernest Augustus, Elector of Brunswick-Lüneburg (1629–1698)
