= Augustus Baldwin =

Augustus Baldwin may refer to:

- Augustus C. Baldwin (1817–1903), U.S. Representative from Michigan
- Augustus Warren Baldwin (1776–1866), naval officer and political figure in Upper Canada

== See also ==
- Augustus Baldwin Longstreet (1790–1870), American lawyer and humorist
