= Augustus D. Splivalo =

Californian Assembly Representative (1840–1911)

Augustus Daniel Splivalo

California State Assembly

Personal details
- Born: May 24, 1840 Off the coast of Peru on board his father's ship
- Died: December 12, 1911 (aged 71) San Francisco, California, U.S.
- Resting place: Holy Cross Cemetery, Colma, California, U.S.
- Education: University of Santa Clara

Augustus Daniel Splivalo (May 24, 1840 – December 12, 1911) was an American politician and lawyer. In 1870, he was the first Italian American to serve in the California State Assembly. He was a prominent attorney and graduate of Santa Clara University.

His father was Stefano Splivalo, an Italian, born in Viganj, Austrian Empire; and his mother was Teresa (née Balzano) Splivalo, also Italian, born in Livorno, Grand Duchy of Tuscany.
