= Augustus A. White =

American surgeon (born 1936)

- Born: June 4, 1936 (age 90); Memphis, Tennessee, U.S.
- Citizenship: American
- Education: B.A. M.D. Ph.D.
- Alma mater: Brown University; Stanford University School of Medicine; Karolinska Institute
- Occupations: Orthopedist; Orthopedic Surgeon
- Notable work: The Clinical Biomechanics of the Spine; Your Aching Back
- Spouse: Anita White

Augustus A. White III (born June 4, 1936) is an American surgeon who is the Ellen and Melvin Gordon Distinguished Professor of Medical Education and Professor of Orthopedic Surgery at Harvard Medical School and a former Orthopaedic Surgeon-in-Chief at Beth Israel Hospital, Boston, Massachusetts. White was the first African American medical student at Stanford, surgical resident at Yale University, professor of medicine at Yale, and department head at a Harvard-affiliated hospital (Beth Israel Hospital).

== Biography ==
White was born on June 4, 1936, in Memphis, Tennessee, to his father, Augustus A. White Jr., and mother Vivian White. When he was eight, his father, a doctor, died unexpectedly. White and his mother moved in with an aunt and uncle. At thirteen, White left Tennessee to attend Northfield Mount Hermon School in Mount Hermon, Massachusetts. Upon graduation, White enrolled at Brown University, earning a B.A. in psychology and varsity letters in football and lacrosse. He then attended Stanford University Medical School, serving as student body President and graduating in 1961.

After graduating from medical school, White served as an intern at the University of Michigan Medical Center, a general surgery resident at Presbyterian Medical Center, San Francisco, CA, and an orthopedic resident at Yale Medical Center.

From 1966 to 1968, White served as Captain in the United States Army Medical Corps. From August 1966 to August 1967, he served as a combat surgeon at the 85th Evacuation Hospital in Qui Nhon, Vietnam. During his deployment, he volunteered during his off-duty time at the St. Francis Leprosarium, earning a Bronze Star for this work, as well as for a volunteer mission to help retrieve an injured soldier from a mountainside.

Following his military service, White earned a Ph.D. in biomechanics from the Karolinska Institute in Stockholm, Sweden. Upon returning to the United States and to Yale University, White was appointed assistant professor of Orthopedic Surgery (1969-1972), Associate Professor of Orthopedic Surgery (1972-1976), and Professor of Orthopedic Surgery (1977-1978). White was recruited to Beth Israel Hospital in 1978 as Orthpaedic Surgeon-in-Chief, serving in that position until 1991. At Beth Israel, he also served as Chief of the Spine Surgery Division (1991-1992) and Director of the Daniel E. Hogan Spine Fellowship Program (1983-2003). While at Beth Israel, White was Professor of Orthopaedic Surgery (1978-) and Ellen and Melvin Gordon Professor of Medical Education (2001-) at Harvard Medical School and Professor of Orthopaedic Surgery (1978-), Harvard-MIT Division of Health Sciences and Technology.

== Honors ==
White was a Brown University Alumni Trustee, served on the Board of Fellows from 1981 to 1992, and as member of the Committee on Medical Education (1991-1996). He was the President and co-founder of the J. Robert Gladden Society, whose mission “is to increase diversity within the orthopaedic profession and promote the highest quality musculoskeletal care for all people.” In 1989, White was appointed President of the University of Maryland at Baltimore, though he resigned a few weeks later before formally taking office, after a dispute with the Board of Regents. In 1996, White served as Chairman of the Diversity Committee of the American Academy of Orthopaedic Surgeons. He authored the textbook Clinical Biomechanics of the Spine and the book for patients Your Aching Back. Since retiring from surgery in 2001, White has researched and written about issues of diversity and cultural sensitivity in medicine. While studying in Sweden, White met his wife, Anita. They have three children.

== Works or publications ==
- Clinical Biomechanics of the Spine (1978)
- Your Aching Back (1990)
- Seeing Patients (2011)
