= Augustus Smith =

Augustus Smith may refer to:

- Augustus L. Smith (1833–1902), American politician and businessman
- Augustus Smith (politician) (1804–1872), British politician and governor of the Isles of Scilly
- Augustus Smith (priest) (1844–1916), Barbadian cricketer and Anglican priest
- Augustus William Smith (1802–1866), educator, astronomer and mathematician
- A. Ledyard Smith (1901–1985), American archaeologist
- J. Augustus Smith (1891–?), American actor, playwright, and screenwriter

== See also ==
- August E. Smith (1879–1969), American politician and educator
