= Augustus Bateman =

English cricketer

Augustus Bateman (3 August 1839 – 18 December 1922) was an English first-class cricketer active 1859–62 who played for Nottinghamshire and Cambridge University. He was born in West Leake and died in Mapperley.
