= Augustus Koranteng Kyei =

Online Journalist

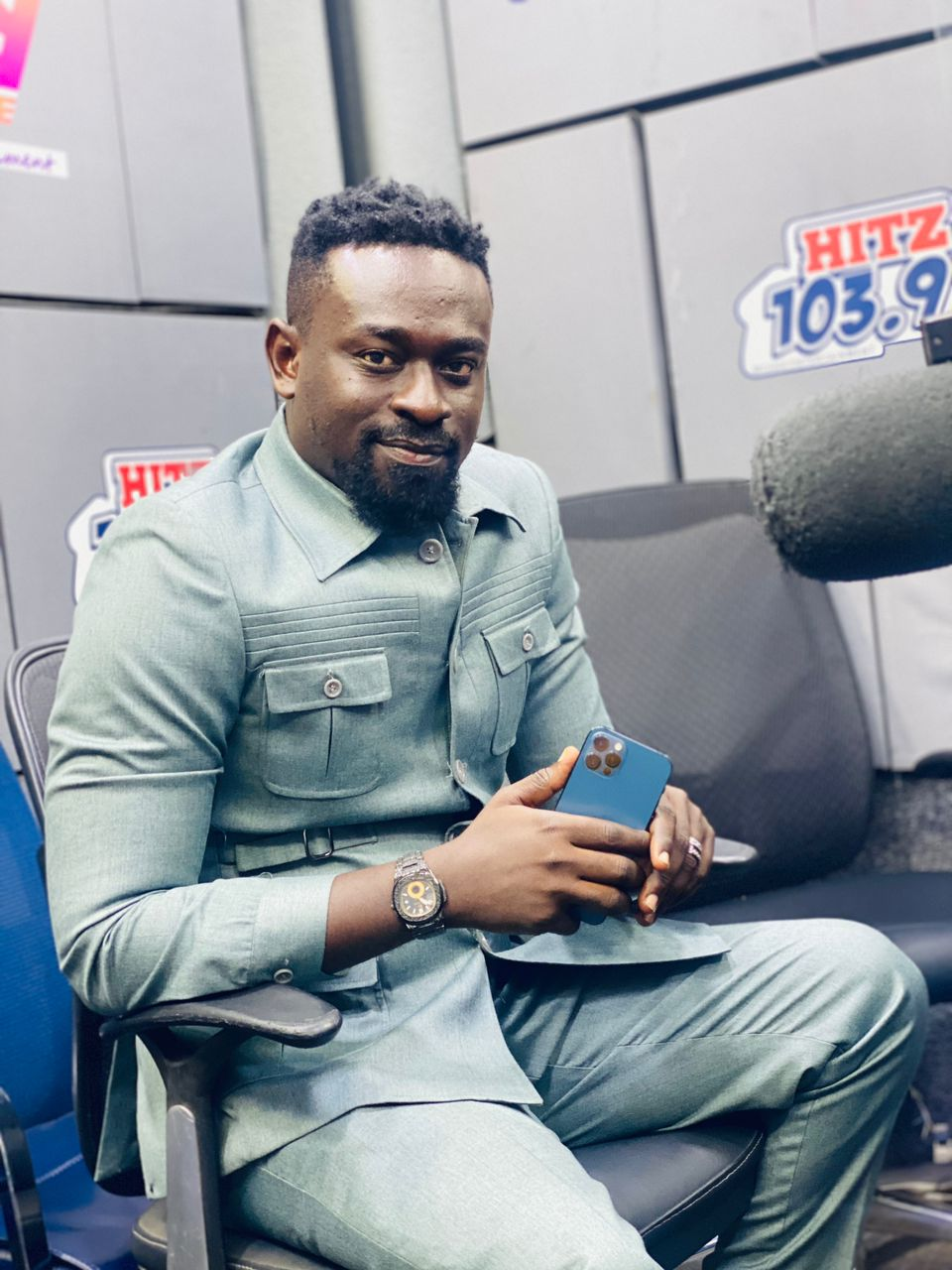
- Born: March 27, 1990 (age 35); Agona Duakwa, Ghana
- Education: MA in Media & Digital Comms Management
- Occupation: Blogger
- Years active: 2017 – present
- Spouse: Mrs Adwoa Tanoa Kyei
- Website: www.kobbykyeinews.com

Augustus Koranteng Kyei (born March 27, 1990), also professionally known as Kobby Kyei, is a Ghanaian blogger focusing on positive humanitarian and social development stories. Originally from Agona Duakwa, he started out as a lifestyle and entertainment blogger.

== Early life, career and education ==
Born to Ghanaian parents at Agona Duakwa in the central region, Kobby Kyei completed High School in 2009 from Nyankumasi Ahenkro, completed a Diploma in Music from the University of Education, Winneba in 2012 and earned a Degree in Music Education in 2016. He's also a professional trumpeter. He earned a Master of Arts in Media and Digital Communications Management from the University of Professional Studies, Accra, in 2025.

Kobby Kyei is among the award-winning bloggers in Ghana and has won many awards in Ghana including National Communications Awards, (Online Media Personality) Youth Excellence Awards, (Best Youth Blogger Of The Year) Ghana Tertiary Awards ( Tertiary Star Role Model Of the Year ),Ghana Web Excellence Awards (Best Blogger of the Year).

== Reporting and interviews ==
Kobby Officially started blogging in 2017 and has since written, interviewed and worked with a lot of Ghanaian celebrities like KSM, Sarkodie, Kwabena Kwabena, Akwaboah, King Promise, Samini, Stonebwoy, Kwaw Kese, Abeiku Santana, Mzvee, Adina, Mona4reall, Cina Soul, Sammy Forson, just to name a few.

== Recognitions ==
Year	Recognition	Body
2022	2021 Youth Excellence Awards Africa (YEA) Awardee	Youth Excellence Award Africa, Ghana, West Africa
2021	Ghana Web Excellence Awardee	Ghana Web, Ghana
2020	National Communications Awards Awardee	RAD Communications Limited, Ghana
