= Augustus Keppel =

Augustus Keppel may refer to:

- Augustus Keppel, 1st Viscount Keppel (1725-1786), Admiral Royal Navy
- Augustus Keppel Stephenson (1827-1904), Treasury Solicitor
- Augustus Keppel, 5th Earl of Albemarle (1794-1851), MP for Arundel
