= Augustus Pierce =

American politician (c.1877–1934)

- Born: c. 1877; New York, US
- Died: January 16, 1934 (age 57); Manhattan, New York, US
- Occupation: Assistant Superintendent
- Years active: 1907–1934
- Employer: New York City Department of Sanitation
- Known for: Tammany Hall politician

Augustus F. Pierce (c. 1877 – January 16, 1934) was an American politician who served as the Tammany Hall leader of the Bronx's 8th assembly district in New York City until his death in 1934. An employee of the city since 1907, at the time of his death he worked for the Department of Sanitation.

== Early life and family ==
Augustus F. Pierce was born c. 1877 to Franklin and Jane Pierce (née McGinnis) in New York. In the 1910 United States census he was listed as married to Loretta Pierce (b. 1888) and had an eight-year-old son; the family resided in Manhattan.

== Political career ==
Pierce campaigned for John P. O'Brien in the 1933 mayoral election in the Bronx. Fiorello H. La Guardia, an enemy of Tammany Hall, won that election, which took place on November 7, but opponents of La Guardia still had a reasonable chance to block his measures in the Board of Aldermen. Bronx alderman Alford J. Williams died in December 1933, and the Board convened on January 16, 1934, to elect his successor. Pierce was in the audience of the meeting to support Thomas Dolen, the Tammany Hall leader of the borough.

John S. McGinley, a member of the Recovery Party and ally of La Guardia's, was elected as Williams's successor by a vote of 42 to 19, thus stripping Tammany Hall of control of the Board which it had had since consolidation in 1896. This vote was unexpected and made possible by the defections of 14 aldermen allied with Tammany Hall's citywide leader John F. Curry and 21 allied with Curry's Brooklyn ally John H. McCooey. Minutes after the vote Pierce collapsed from a heart attack in the chambers of the Board, and minutes later was pronounced dead at the scene. His death was directly attributed to the vote result. He was buried in the Gates of Heaven Cemetery.

McCooey died less than a week after Pierce; these deaths spelled the end of Curry's hold on Tammany Hall, and of Tammany Hall's hold of the city. James Farley, the Democratic leader of New York state, announced his support of La Guardia to Democratic U.S. President Franklin D. Roosevelt, giving La Guardia access to federal funding and consolidating his control over the city.
