= Augustus Dumbar =

Liberian former footballer

Personal information
- Date of birth: 21 August 1978 (age 48)
- Position: Forward

Senior career*
Years	Team	Apps	(Gls)
- Mighty Barrolle
1997–1999	RKC	5	(2)

International career
1997	Liberia	4	(0)
- * Club domestic league appearances and goals

Augustus Dumbar (born 21 August 1978) is a Liberian former footballer who is last known to have played as a forward for RKC. He was also capped for the Liberia national team.

== Career ==
In 1997, Dumbar signed for RKC in the Netherlands after training with Ajax, the Netherlands' most successful club.
