= Augustus Tennant =

New Zealand cricketer

Personal information
- Full name: Augustus Eatwell Tennant
- Born: 19 November 1841; Simla, India
- Died: 28 November 1892 (aged 51); Hokitika, New Zealand
- Height: 5 ft 8.5 in (1.74 m)
- Batting: Right-handed
- Role: Wicket-keeper

Domestic team information
- Years: Team
- 1863–64 to 1865–66: Canterbury

Career statistics
Competition	First-class
Matches	3
Runs scored	31
Batting average	5.16
100s/50s	0/0
Top score	24
Balls bowled	88
Wickets	2
Bowling average	7.50
5 wickets in innings	0
10 wickets in match	0
Best bowling	2/7
Catches/stumpings	4/2
- Source: Cricinfo, 25 September 2019

Augustus Eatwell Tennant (19 November 1841 – 28 November 1892) was an Indian-born cricketer who played first-class cricket for Canterbury in New Zealand from 1864 to 1866.

== Life and career ==
Augustus Tennant was born in Simla in British India and educated at Rugby School in England, where he played in the First XI in 1859 and 1860. He arrived in New Zealand in the early 1860s and began working for the Canterbury Province government. He was appointed as Commissioner’s Clerk of the West Canterbury goldfields in Hokitika in 1865. When the County of Westland was formed he held a position in the County Treasury in Hokitika, and on the formation of Westland Province he held a position in the Superintendent’s Office. When the provinces were abolished in 1873 he worked for the national government in the Stamp Office, still in Hokitika.

Tennant's wife died in 1872, after which "[b]ad times swept over him and he commenced to drift". In 1874 he was convicted of assault. In 1882 he was arrested on a charge of embezzling from the Stamp Office, convicted and sentenced in March 1883 to nine months' labour.

Tennant died of Bright's disease, aggravated by other ailments, in Westland Hospital in Hokitika on 28 November 1892. He was 51.

== Cricket career ==
Tennant played several matches for Canterbury in the 1860s as a batsman and wicket-keeper.

He was Canterbury's best batsman when George Parr's English team visited in 1863–64. When Parr's XI dismissed the Canterbury XXII for 30 and 105, Tennant made 28, the highest score on either side, in the second innings. After the early finish of that match, a second match was played between two elevens combining the English and Canterbury players, and Tennant was the highest scorer in that match too, with 21 and 33.

Tennant was less successful with the bat in his first two first-class matches for Canterbury, but in his last match, in 1865–66, he again made the highest score on either side with 24 in Canterbury's second innings. In 1864–65 his wicket-keeping drew praise from the Lyttelton Times, which described it after the match against Otago as one of "the most noticeable features in the whole game" and as a model for the young cricketer.

Tennant retained his involvement with cricket after he transferred to Hokitika, and at the time of his death he was the secretary of the Hokitika Cricket Club.
