= Augustus Guy de Vaudricourt =

French painter

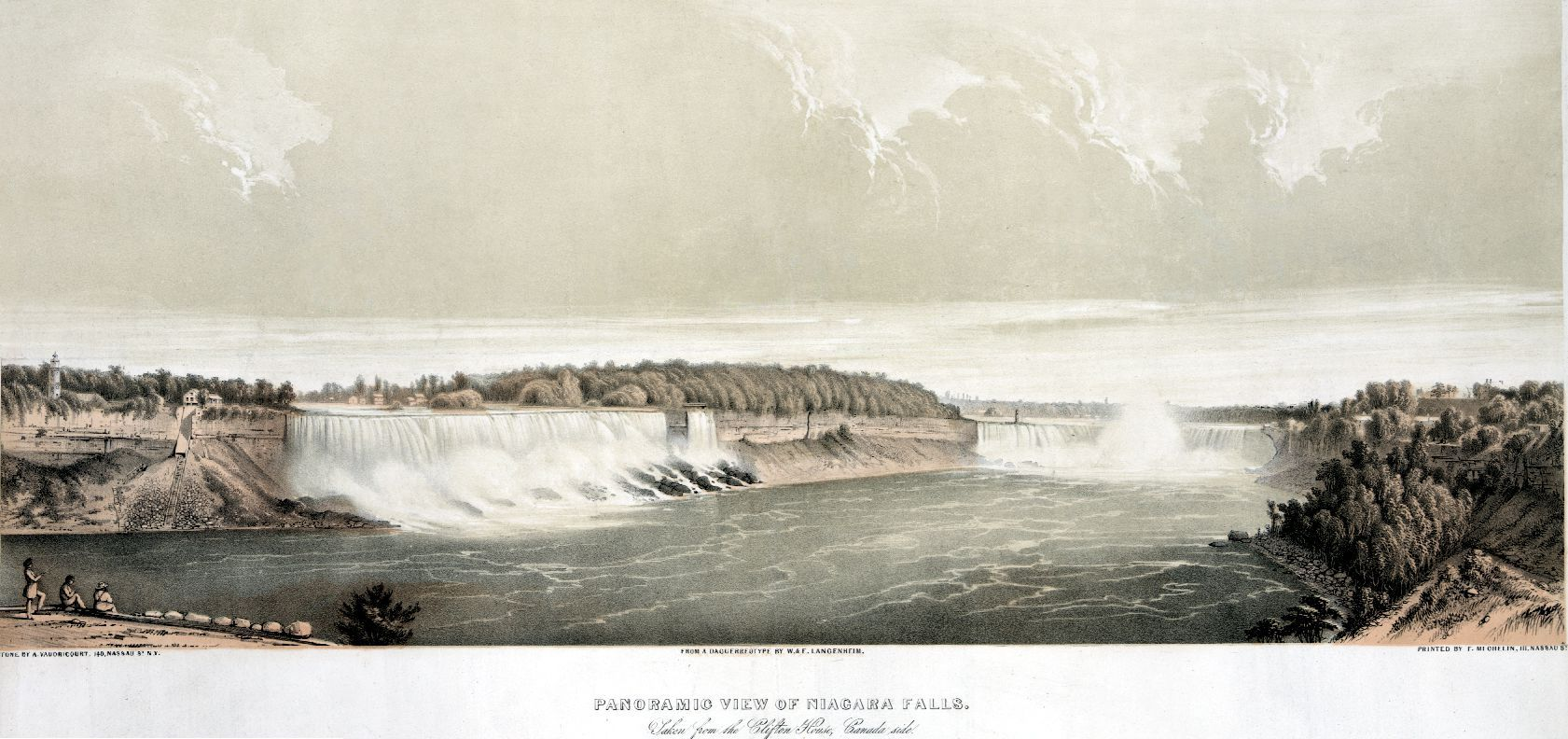
"Panoramic View of Niagara Falls, from the Clifton House, Canada side"

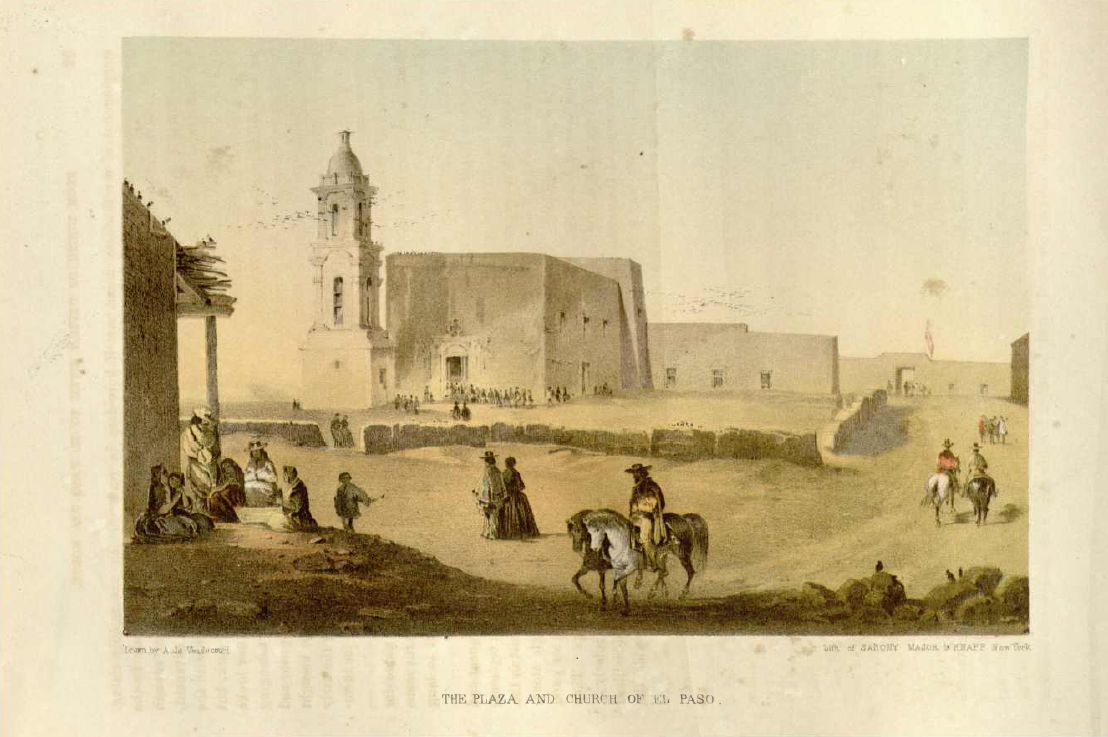
"The Plaza and Church of El Paso"

Augustus Guy de Vaudricourt was a painter and lithographer active in the 1800s in France, the United States and Mexico, and is noted for his image contributions to the Report on the United States and Mexican Boundary Survey of 1848-1855.

de Vaudricourt's panorama of the Niagara Falls is probably his most iconic image.
