= Augustus Allen Hayes =

American chemist

- Born: 28 February 1806
- Died: 21 June 1882
- Occupation: Chemist

Augustus Allen Hayes (February 28, 1806 – June 21, 1882) was an American chemist.

== Biography ==
Hayes was born in Windsor, Vermont, Feb. 28, 1806. He graduated from the Norwich military school in 1823, and studied chemistry under Prof. James Freeman Dana at Dartmouth, 1823–1826.

Hayes was assistant professor of chemistry in the New Hampshire medical college, 1826–1828, and an expert chemist in Boston, Mass., 1828–1882. He was the discoverer of the organic alkaloid sanguinaria; invented in 1838 a novel arrangement of steam boilers for the economical generation of steam: and first suggested the application of oxides of iron in refining pig-iron; and a process for the production of saltpetre from sodium nitrate by the action of potassium hydroxide.

Hayes was state assayer of Massachusetts, and he received the honorary degree of M.D. from Dartmouth in 1846. He died in Brookline, Mass., June 21, 1882.

== Publications ==
Hayes the author of papers on:

- The Cause of the Color of Lake Leman, Geneva;
- The Bed Oxide of Zinc in New Jersey,
- and technical papers contributed to the Proceedings of various scientific societies of which he was a member and to the American Journal of Science.
