= Augustus Lochner =

English soldier and cricketer

Augustus Meyer Lochner (1 October 1827 – 20 February 1865) was an English soldier who played as a cricketer in one match for Tasmania. He was born in Enfield and died in Plumstead Common.

Lochner made a single first-class appearance for the side, during the 1853–54 season, against Victoria. He scored 19 not out in the first innings in which he batted, and a single run in the second.

== Military career ==
In 1845, Augustus Lochner was a "gentleman cadet" and the Royal Military Academy, Woolwich. In May 1846, he became a second lieutenant in the Royal Engineers, and in November of the same year he was promoted to first lieutenant. Lochner continued with his military career: in 1859, he is recorded as being promoted from second captain to full captain in the Royal Engineers. He was a serving officer with the rank of captain at the time of his death in 1865.

== See also ==
- List of Tasmanian representative cricketers
