= Augustus Martin =

Augustus Martin may refer to:

- Augustus Marie Martin (1803–1875), bishop of Natchitoches
- Augustus N. Martin (1847–1901), U.S. Representative from Indiana
- Augustus Pearl Martin (1835–1902), mayor of Boston, Massachusetts, and American Civil War artillery officer
- C. Augustus Martin (born 1955), American scholar
