= Augustus Griffin =

Canadian Horticulturist

- Born: June 8, 1883; Visalia, Tulare, California, USA
- Died: October 13, 1946 (aged 63); Brooks, Alberta
- Occupations: Irrigation engineer, horticulturist
- Years active: 1918-
- Known for: Planting many heritage trees in Brooks, Alberta
- Notable work: pioneering horticulturist

Augustus Griffin (1883–1946) was a horticulture pioneer who collected, grew, crossed and tested plants at the Canadian Pacific Railway (CPR) Headquarters Farm (now the Alberta Horticultural Research Station) in Brooks, Alberta, Canada where he worked as irrigation engineer. His former home is a registered historical site.

== CPR Headquarters Farm ==
=== Griffin Poplar ===
Hybrids created by Griffin in 1918, by crossing "a native female cottonwood collected at Stevelle and a male Russian poplar" became the "backbone of many of the farm shelterbelts [in Alberta]. Six male clones were selected from these hybrids. Brooks #1 was named "Griffin Poplar" (P. x 'Griffin') after Griffin. Brooks #4 and #6 became part of the shelterbelt program in Alberta.

While the Balsam poplar (Populus balsamifera) is a native to Alberta, in cities in Alberta, most planted city trees are either a ‘Northwest’ hybrid (P. x ‘Northwest’) or Griffin poplar, which was developed at Brooks Research Centre in Alberta. The Griffin poplar has a more conical form. The Calgary Herald described these hybrid poplars as "monster trees" which are "great for parks and along boulevards are too big for most modern yards."

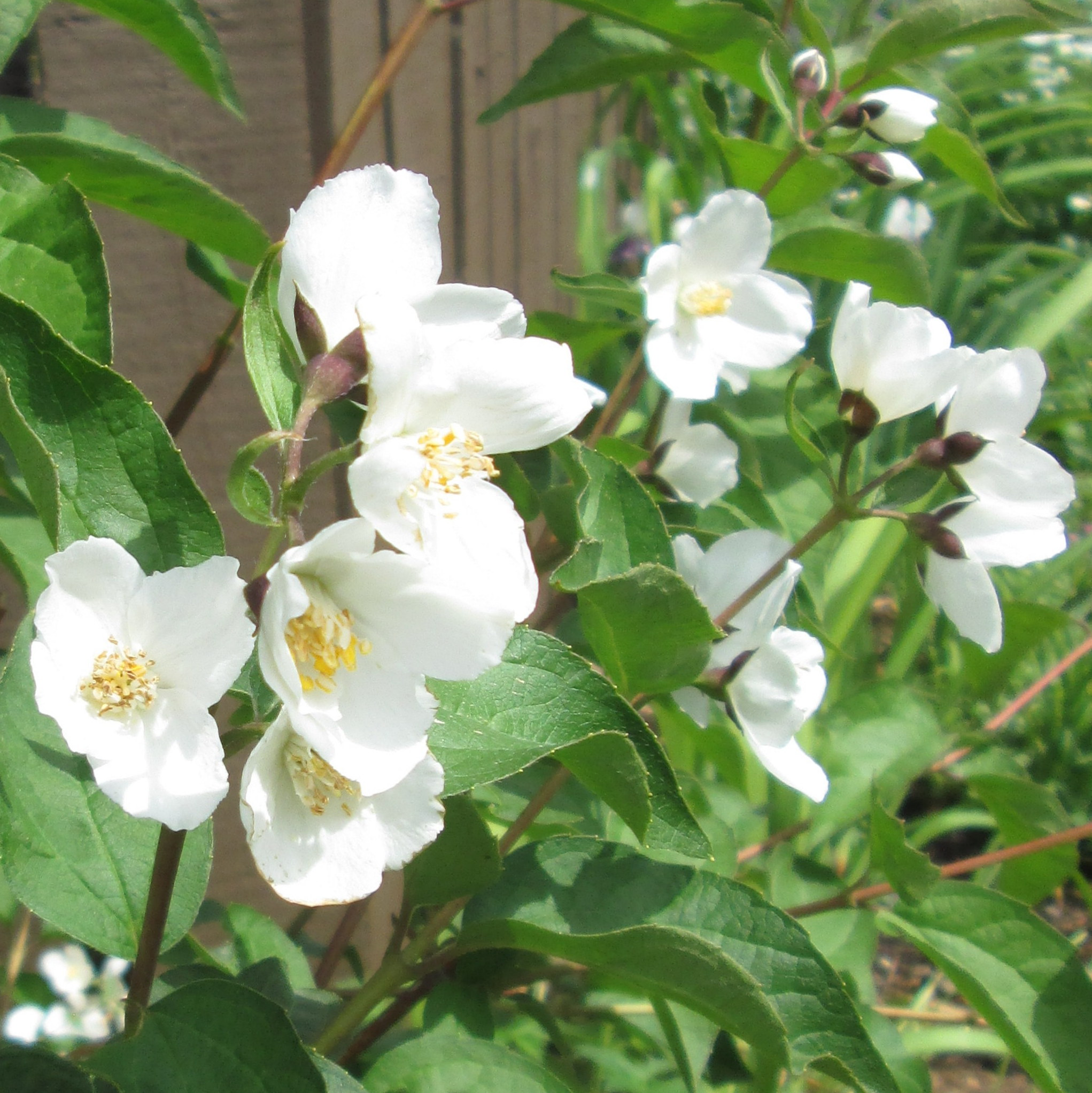
Waterton Mockorange Philadelphus lewisii 'Waterton'

In 1933 Augustus Griffin noted that this plant was growing in what is now Waterton Lakes National Park of Canada on the east side of the Rocky Mountains. The Waterton Mockorange Philadelphus lewisii 'Waterton' was hybridized by the Alberta Horticultural Research Station in Brooks, Alberta, Canada. It is drought-tolerant and is suitable for xeriscaping. It grows to 4–6 ft. (1.2-1.8 m) in height. It is hardy from USDA zones 3 to 9.
