= Augustus Constantine =

American architect

Augustus E. Constantine (September 11, 1898 - November 13, 1976) was an architect in Charleston, South Carolina. He is known for his Art Moderne architecture.

Constantine was born in Skopelos, Greece and graduated from Georgia Tech in 1921. He moved to Charleston, South Carolina in 1940. He died in Charleston, South Carolina in 1976. The papers of Augustus Constantine, including many drawings and photographs of the works listed below, are at the South Carolina Historical Society.

== Works ==
The following works by Augustus Constantine were still standing in 2013:

- Sapeloe Island Plantation (1935–36)
- Georgia State Office Building (1940)
- Hampton Pharmacy, Charleston, South Carolina (1941-1942)
- Chicco Apartment conversion (now Hampton Inn) (1943)
- My Shop, 248 King St., Charleston, South Carolina (1945)
- 299 King St., Charleston, South Carolina) (1945)
- 289 King St., Charleston, South Carolina (1945)
- John P. Botzis office building (1945)
- American Theatre, Charleston, SC (1946)
- Taylor's Mens Store, Charleston, South Carolina (1946)
- Citizens & Southern Bank, 284 King St., Charleston, South Carolina (remodel) (1948)
- Chase Furniture, 414 King St., Charleston, South Carolina (1946)
- 139 Calhoun St., Charleston, South Carolina (1946)
- Condon's Department Store, southwest corner of King St. and Warren St., Charleston, South Carolina (1948)
- Charleston Mattress Factory, 346 Spring St., Charleston, South Carolina (1948)
- 14 George St., Charleston, South Carolina (interior remodel) (1948)
- Edward Kronsberg residence, 91 Hagood Ave., Charleston, South Carolina (1949)
- A.E. Constantine residence, 201 Grove St., Charleston, South Carolina (1949)
- Garden Theatre, Charleston, South Carolina (1949)
- Pastime Amusement Theatre, St. Andrews, Charleston, South Carolina (1949)
- Reid Center, 169 St. Philip Street, Charleston, South Carolina (1950)
- Sacred Heart School (addition)(1950)
- 476-478 East Bay Street, Charleston, South Carolina (1950)
- 242-244 King St., Charleston, South Carolina (remodel)(1952)
- Stella Maris parochial school (1953)
- W.T. Grant department store, King St. and Calhoun St., Charleston, South Carolina (1955)
- Central Drug Store, 286 Meeting St., Charleston, SC (1956)
- McAlister Funeral Home, Charleston, SC (1960)
- Elks Lodge, Charleston, South Carolina (addition) (1962)
- North Charleston post office annex, Durant and Daley, North Charleston, South Carolina (1963)
- Morris St. Baptist Church (1966)
- James Island High School Auditorium, Charleston, South Carolina (1966)
- 276 East Bay St., Charleston, South Carolina
- Greek community school and auditorium
- Labor Board building, Charleston, South Carolina)
- Nurses quarters, Naval Shipyard, North Charleston, South Carolina)
- War housing project, Beaufort, South Carolina)
- Army air base, Florence, South Carolina)
- Charleston County Health Center, Charleston, South Carolina)
- Kerrison's, Charleston, South Carolina (remodel))

For following projects by Augustus Constantine are no longer extant:

- Arcade Theatre, Liberty St., Charleston, SC (1947)
- Marion Square Bandstand, Charleston, South Carolina (1948)
- Franke Home dormitory, Calhoun St., Charleston, South Carolina (1958)
- Office building, 34 George St., Charleston, South Carolina (1959)
- Cowperthwait, 209-213 King St., Charleston, South Carolina)
- Seaside Farm Plantation, Mt. Pleasant, South Carolina

== Gallery ==
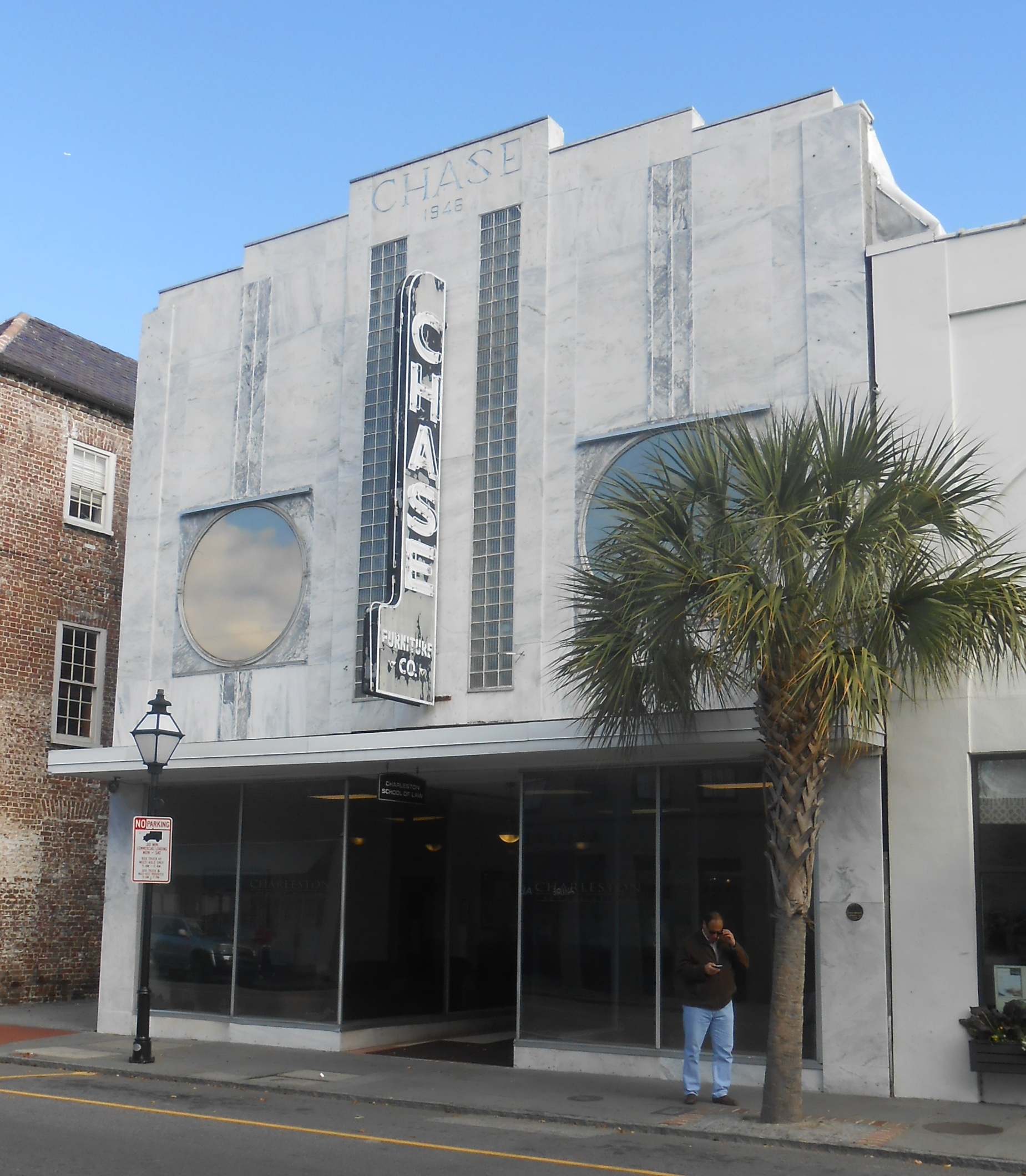
Chase Furniture Building, 414 King St., Charleston, South Carolina

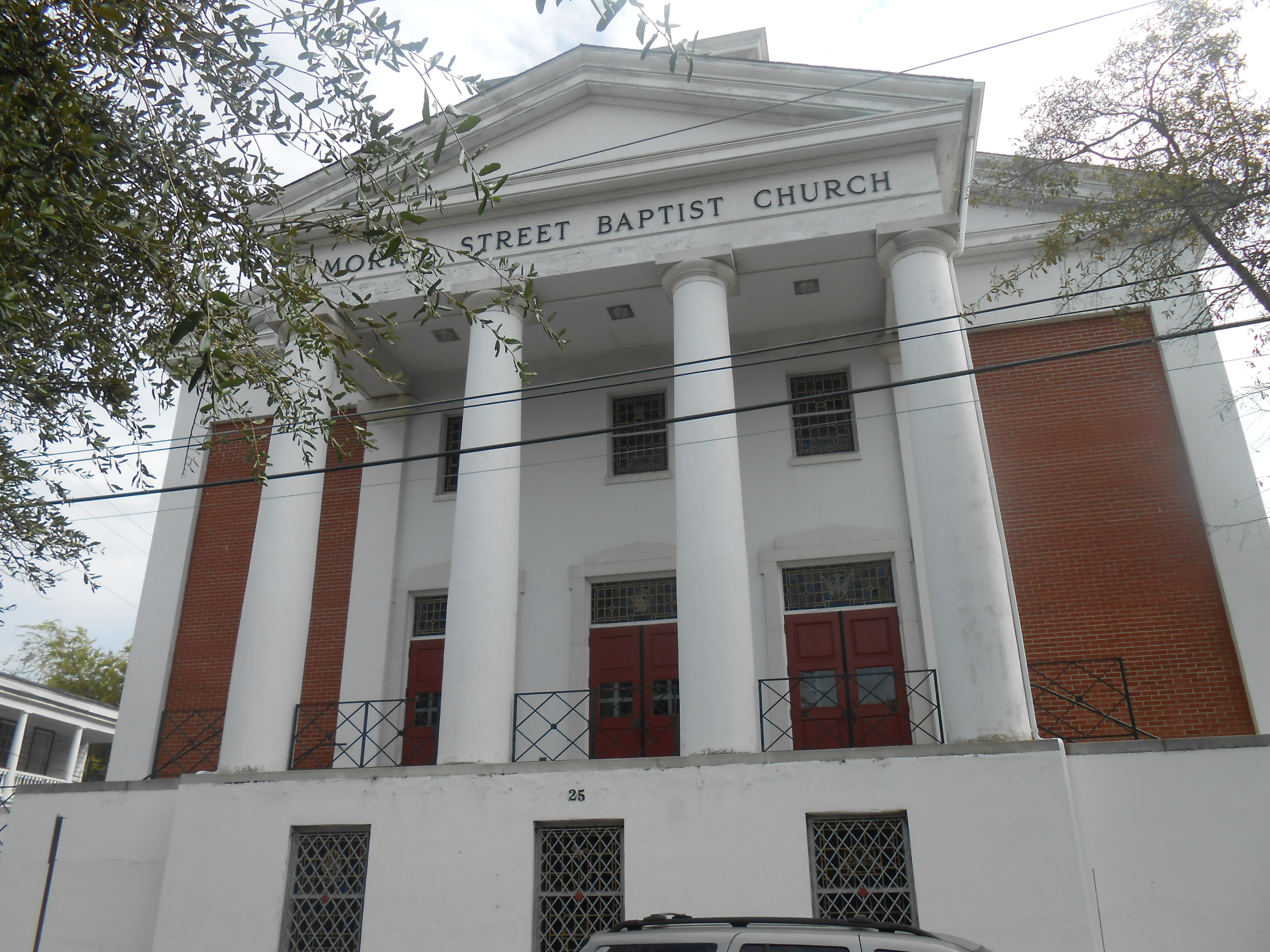
Morris Street Baptist Church, Charleston, South Carolina

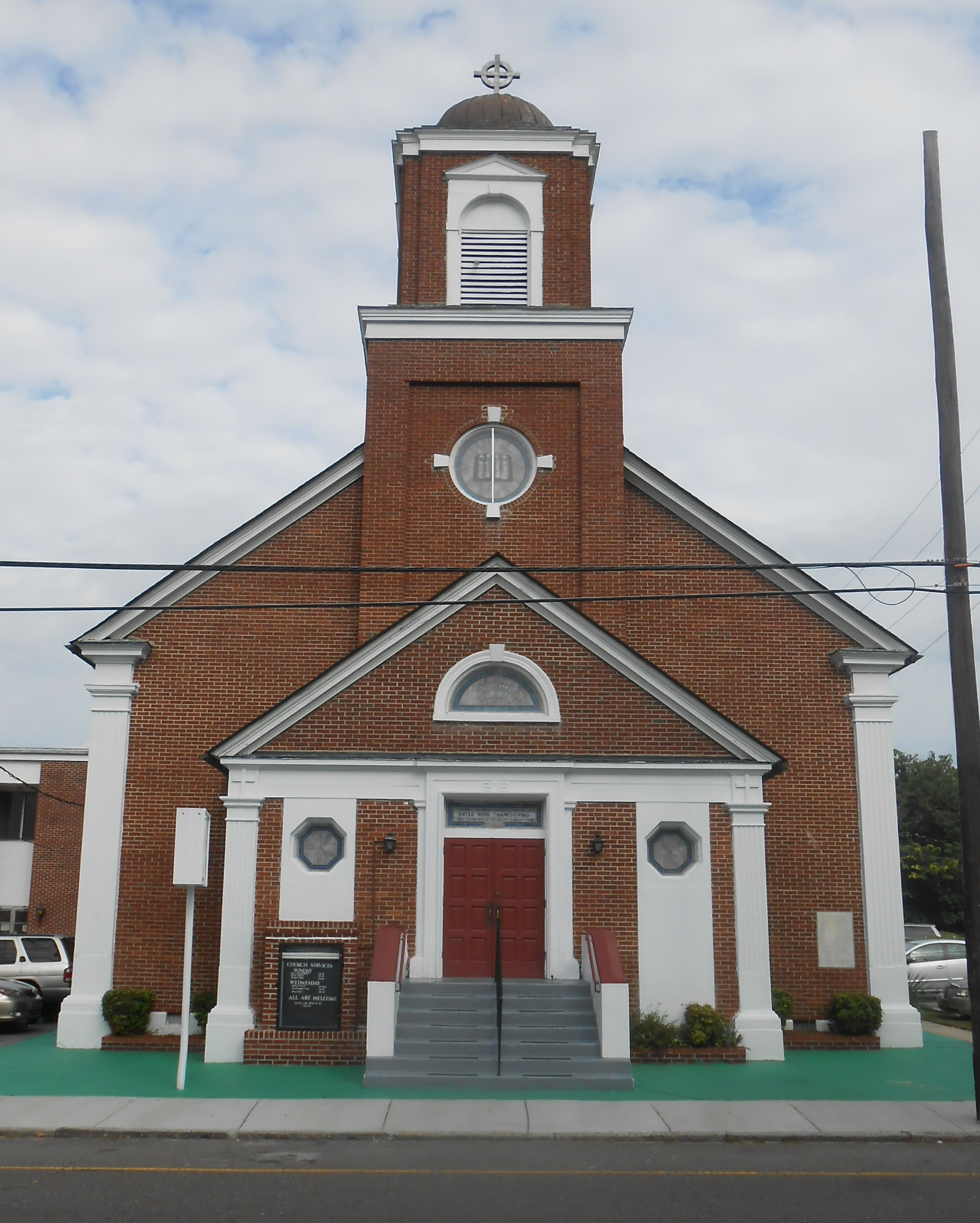
Ebenezer A.M.E. Church, 44 Nassau St., Charleston, South Carolina

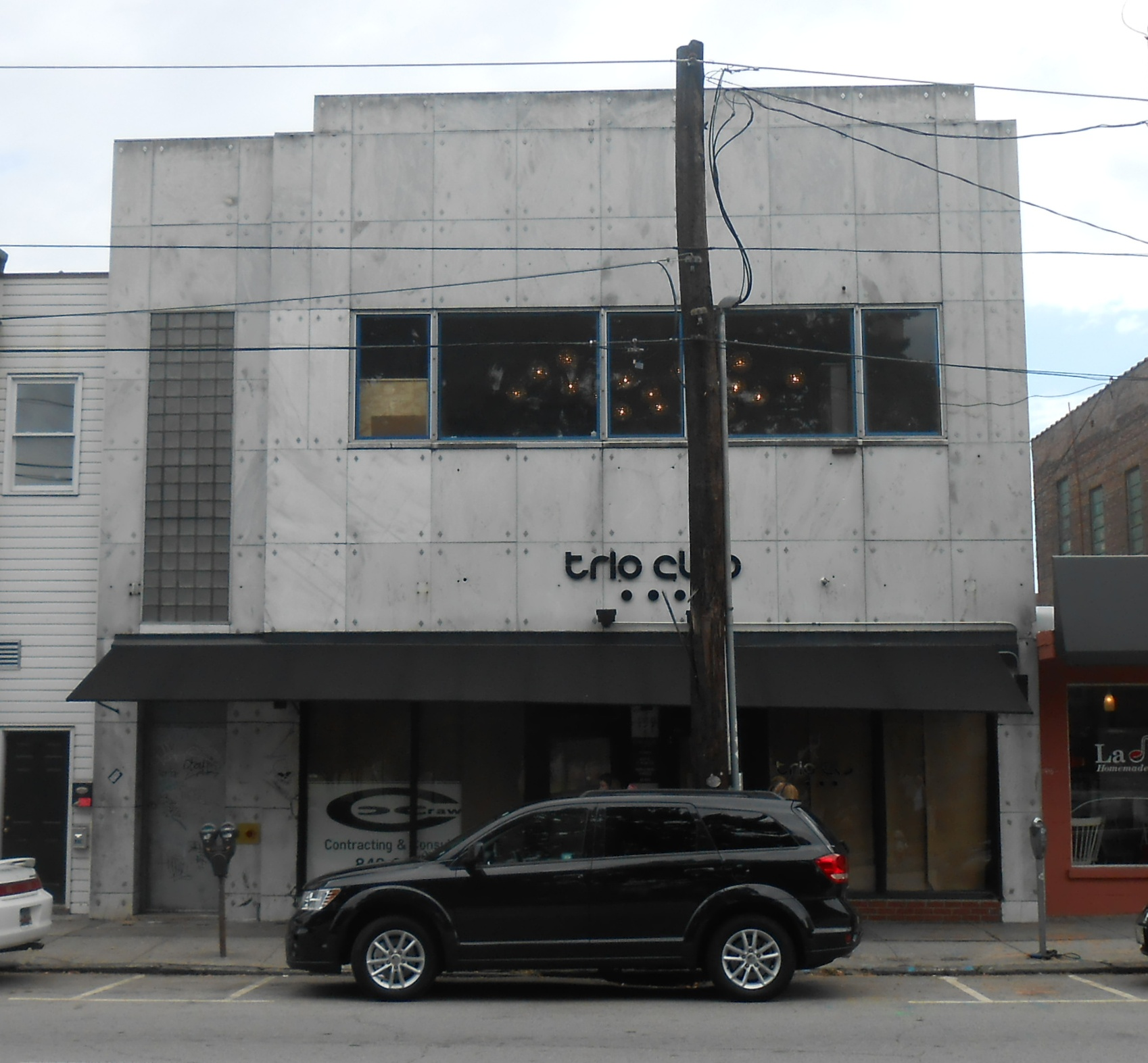
139 Calhoun St., Charleston, South Carolina

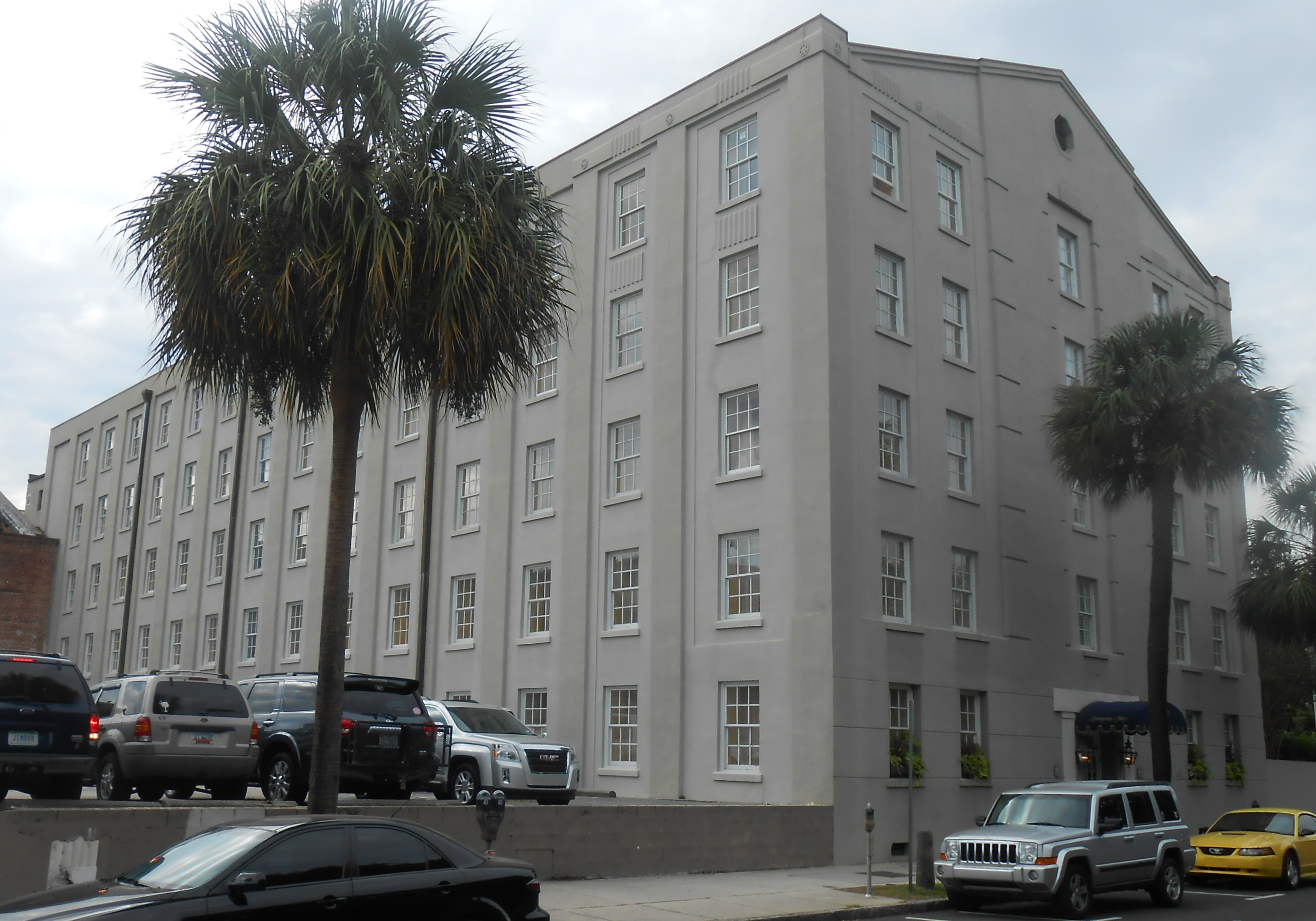
Hampton Inn, 345 Meeting St., Charleston, South Carolina

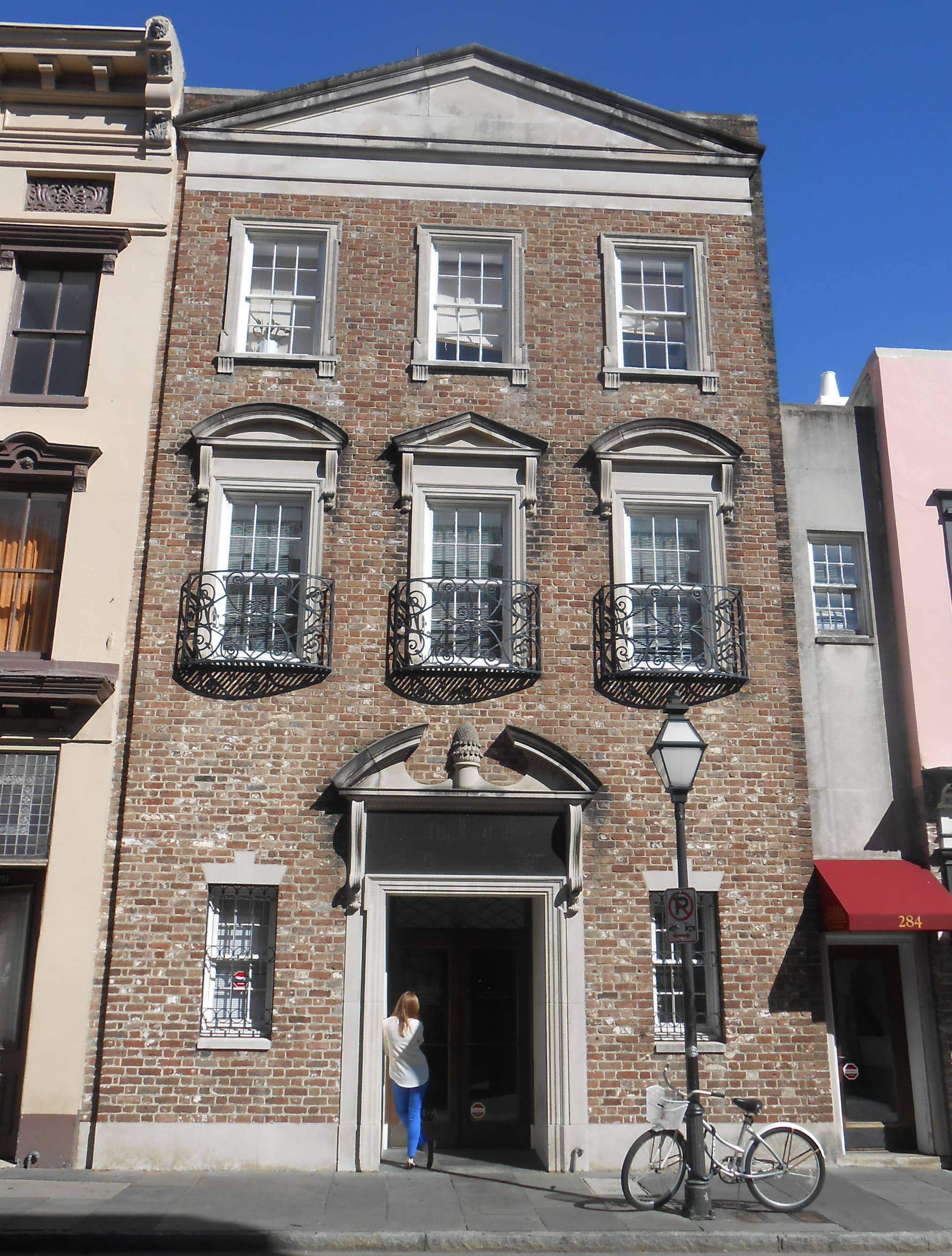
Citizens & Southern National Bank, 284 King St., Charleston, South Carolina
