= Augustus Huggins Abernathy =

American physician

- Born: May 31, 1838; Litchfield, Connecticut, U.S.
- Died: November 9, 1884 (aged 46); Bridgeport, Connecticut, U.S.
- Education: Yale School of Medicine (MD)
- Medical career
- Profession: Physician, Surgeon
- Sub-specialties: Obstetrics

Augustus Huggins Abernathy (May 21, 1838 – November 9, 1884) was an American medical doctor.

Abernathy was born in Litchfield, Connecticut, May 21, 1838, the second son and third child of the Hon. Elisha S. Abernathy and Charlotte Mary Huggins Abernathy; his parents removed to Bridgeport, Conn., in 1848. After some graduate study at Yale Medical School, he entered early in 1865 the U. S. Navy as Acting Assistant Surgeon, but the speedy close of the American Civil War led to his resignation, in October of the same year. In 1866 he entered on active practice as a physician and surgeon in Bridgeport, and was thus engaged, with growing reputation and success, especially in obstetrical cases, until his death.

He was also a member of the City Board of Health for many years, for twelve years a member of the Board of Education, and in 1882 served as representative in the Connecticut General Assembly. For two years before his death he suffered at times intensely from neuralgia of the chest; he died very suddenly, it was supposed from angina pectoris, at his home, November 9, 1884, aged 46.

He was married, in Irvington-on-Hudson, September 10, 1874, to Henrietta Stagg; they had one son and two daughters.
