= Augustus Nicodemus Lopes =

Brazilian minister and theologian

Augustus Nicodemus Gomes Lopes (João Pessoa, Paraíba, 25 September 1954) is a Brazilian presbyterian minister and calvinist theologian, writer and professor. He was vice-president of the Supreme Council of the Presbyterian Church of Brazil from 2018 to 2022 and Chancellor of Mackenzie Presbyterian University from 2003 to 2013. The Christian Post has called him one of the greatest Brazilian conservative theologians. He is married to Minka Lopes and has four children. Today, he is a pastor at Esperança Bible Presbyterian Church in the USA.

His line of interpretation follows the grammatical-historical method as opposed to the historical-critical interpretation. He believes that the divine revelation through spiritual gifts and prophecy has ended, and does not believe in manifestation of tongues as a sign of the Holy Spirit's activities in modern days. He also discusses practical issues such as family, missions, holiness, being filled with the Spirit, worship, and spiritual warfare.

== Ministerial Biography ==
Lopes graduated in theology at the Seminário Presbiteriano do Norte (North Presbyterian Seminary) in Recife, holds a master's degree in New Testament by the Reformed University of Potchefstroom (South Africa) and a doctorate in biblical interpretation by Westminster Theological Seminary (USA), with studies at Reformed Seminary in Kampen (Netherlands). He has also done postdoctoral studies at Westminster Theological Seminary. He was professor and director of the Seminário Presbiteriano do Norte (Northern Presbyterian Seminary) (1985–1991) in northern Brazil, professor of exegesis at Seminário José Manuel da Conceição (JMC Seminary) in São Paulo, New Testament Professor at the Centro Presbiteriano de Pós-Graduação Andrew Jumper (Andrew Jumper Presbyterian Post-Graduate Center) (1995–2001) in São Paulo, pastor of the First Presbyterian Church of Recife (1989–1991) and pastor of the Evangelical Swiss Church of São Paulo (1995–2001). He was associate pastor of the Presbyterian Church of Santo Amaro, São Paulo, SP until 2014. Lopes was senior pastor of First Presbyterian Church of Goiania (2014 to 2018). He was assistant pastor of the First Presbyterian Church of Recife until 2023.

He is a minister of the Presbyterian Church of Brazil, a Calvinist theologian, professor and writer born in Paraíba. He was chancellor of the Mackenzie Presbyterian University from 2003 to 2013, a position that aims to maintain the Presbyterian confessionality of the institution. He was vice-director and professor of New Testament at the Andrew Jumper Presbyterian Center for Graduate Studies, of the Presbyterian Church of Brazil, in São Paulo, and was the vice-president of the Supreme Council of the Presbyterian Church of Brazil. He was an assistant pastor of the First Presbyterian Church of Recife until 2023. He is considered by many to be one of the greatest Presbyterian preachers and theologians in Brazil. He is recognized for his ability to explain, in a simpler way and in accessible language, the various complex biblical themes such as predestination, God's sovereignty, the origin of evil, eschatology, apologetics, and the difference between churches and sects.

== Online Community ==
In January 2024, Nicodemus founded the online community Living the Scriptures, a platform dedicated to the study of the Bible and Reformed Theology (only in portuguese). Launched as an initiative focused on theological education, the community offers courses, live classes, ebooks, devotionals, and interactive forums focused on a Reformed approach to Scripture. The platform's content ranges from introductions to the foundations of the Christian faith to advanced theological topics such as eschatology, hermeneutics, and contemporary challenges to faith. In addition to educational content, Living the Scriptures promotes a space for interaction among members, enabling discussions and sharing of experiences in an online environment. The target audience includes Christians seeking to deepen their biblical knowledge, as well as religious leaders and theology students. With a theological approach based on Reformed principles, the platform aims to equip its members with tools to interpret Scripture and apply its teachings in their daily lives.

== Books ==
Nicodemus has books published in Spanish, Italian and English, as well as Portuguese. Among them are: (titles were translated to English here)

== Books ==
- 1Pedro. São Paulo: Cultura Cristã, 2019.
- 2 e 3 João e Judas. São Paulo: Cultura Cristã, 2008.
- A Bíblia e seus intérpretes: uma breve história da interpretação. São Paulo: Cultura Cristã, 2004.
- A Bíblia e sua família: exposições bíblicas sobre casamento, família e filhos. São Paulo: Cultura Cristã, 2001. (with Minka Lopes)
- A compaixão de Deus: a mensagem de Jonas para a igreja de hoje. São Paulo: Vida Nova, 2018.
- A conquista da terra prometida: a mensagem de Josué para a igreja de hoje. São Paulo: Vida Nova, 2017.
- A história de Jesus. São Paulo: Cultura Cristã, 2023.
- A minha graça te basta: a mensagem de 2Coríntios para a igreja de hoje. São Paulo: Vida Nova, 2022.
- A supremacia e a suficiência de Cristo: a mensagem de Colossenses para a igreja de hoje. São Paulo: Vida Nova, 2013.
- Abraão, o pai da fé: a mensagem de Gênesis 12–25 para a igreja de hoje. São Paulo: Vida Nova, 2023.
- Ainda não é o fim: uma exposição do sermão escatológico de Jesus. Campinas: Luz para o Caminho (LPC), 2006.
- Apóstolos: a verdade bíblica sobre o apostolado. São José dos Campos: Fiel, 2014.
- Avivamento: obra extraordinária de Deus. Rio de Janeiro: GodBooks, 2022.
- Calvino e a responsabilidade social da igreja. São Paulo: Publicações Evangélicas Selecionadas (PES), 1997.
- Calvino, o teólogo do Espírito Santo. São Paulo: Publicações Evangélicas Selecionadas (PES), 1996.
- Caminhos da fé: uma exposição dos Salmos de romagem. Estação da Fé.
- Cheios do Espírito. Vida.
- Combatendo ameaças na igreja: aplicações práticas para fortalecer a nossa fé. Estação da Fé.
- Combatendo seitas e heresias. Alabaster / Estação da Fé.
- Confissões de um pregador. São Paulo: Mundo Cristão, 2023.
- Contra o fluxo. BTBooks / Box95.
- Cristianismo bem explicado: respostas claras para um mundo confuso. São Paulo: Mundo Cristão, 2020.
- Cristianismo descomplicado: questões difíceis da vida cristã de um jeito fácil de entender. São Paulo: Mundo Cristão, 2017.
- Cristianismo facilitado: respostas simples para questões complexas. São Paulo: Mundo Cristão, 2019.
- Cristianismo na universidade: a prática da integração da fé cristã à academia. São Paulo: Vida Nova, 2019.
- Cristianismo simplificado: respostas diretas a dúvidas comuns. São Paulo: Mundo Cristão, 2018.
- Despertamento espiritual: a poderosa ação avivadora do Espírito na igreja. São Paulo: Cultura Cristã, 2022.
- E se Deus for contra nós?. Campina Grande, PB: Visão Cristã, 2017.
- Entre a dor e a graça: o que você precisa saber para enfrentar o sofrimento com perseverança, fidelidade e fé. GodBooks.
- Fé cristã e misticismo: uma avaliação bíblica de tendências doutrinárias atuais. São Paulo: Cultura Cristã, 2000. (co-author)
- Fundamentos da teologia reformada: um comentário da Confissão de Fé de Westminster. São Paulo: Vida Nova, 2026.
- Hebreus. São Paulo: Cultura Cristã, 2016.
- Livres em Cristo: a mensagem de Gálatas para a igreja de hoje. São Paulo: Vida Nova, 2016.
- Mantendo a igreja pura. São Paulo: Cultura Cristã, 2008.
- No princípio de tudo: a mensagem de Gênesis 1–11 para a igreja de hoje. São Paulo: Vida Nova, 2022.
- O ateísmo cristão e outras ameaças à igreja. São Paulo: Mundo Cristão, 2011.
- O culto espiritual: um estudo em 1Coríntios sobre questões atuais e diretrizes bíblicas para o culto cristão. São Paulo: Cultura Cristã, 1999.
- O culto segundo Deus: a mensagem de Malaquias para a igreja de hoje. São Paulo: Vida Nova, 2012.
- O Espírito Santo sob ataque: desafios modernos ao ensino bíblico sobre o Espírito Santo. Os Puritanos.
- O Pentecostes e o crescimento da igreja: a extraordinária ação do Espírito Santo em Atos 2. São Paulo: Vida Nova, 2017.
- O poder de Deus para a salvação: a mensagem de Romanos 1–7 para a igreja de hoje. São Paulo: Vida Nova, 2019.
- O poder de Deus para a santificação: a mensagem de Romanos 8–16 para a igreja de hoje. São Paulo: Vida Nova, 2020.
- O que a Bíblia fala sobre dinheiro. São Paulo: Mundo Cristão, 2021.
- O que a Bíblia fala sobre oração. São Paulo: Mundo Cristão, 2022.
- O que estão fazendo com a igreja: ascensão e queda do movimento evangélico brasileiro. São Paulo: Mundo Cristão, 2008.
- O que vem depois da morte? Quatro verdades sobre o destino eterno. Goiânia: Alabaster / Estação da Fé, 2021.
- O que você precisa saber sobre batalha espiritual. São Paulo: Cultura Cristã, 1997.
- Ordenação de mulheres: que diz o Novo Testamento?. São Paulo: Publicações Evangélicas Selecionadas (PES), 1997.
- Os milagres de Jesus no Evangelho de João. Estação da Fé.
- Panorama do Novo Testamento. São Paulo: Mundo Cristão, 2025.
- Paulo, plantador de igrejas: repensando fundamentos bíblicos da obra missionária. Os Puritanos.
- Polêmicas na igreja: doutrinas, práticas e movimentos que enfraquecem o cristianismo. São Paulo: Mundo Cristão, 2015.
- Pornografia: há algum mal nisso?. Editora dos Clássicos.
- Primeira Carta de João: testes do verdadeiro cristianismo. São Paulo: Cultura Cristã, 2005.
- Profetas: a profecia na Bíblia e na igreja. São José dos Campos: Fiel, 2023.
- Reformatio: devocionais para uma vida transformada pela graça. GodBooks.
- Sexo e santidade: viva sua sexualidade como Deus a planejou. Rio de Janeiro: GodBooks, 2020.
- Teologia relacional: suas origens, seus ensinos, suas consequências. Publicações Evangélicas Selecionadas (PES).
- Tiago. São Paulo: Cultura Cristã, 2006.
- Tolerância no Novo Testamento. São Paulo: Publicações Evangélicas Selecionadas (PES), 2003.
- Trago vocês no coração: a mensagem de Paulo aos Filipenses. São Paulo: Cultura Cristã, 2024.
- Um caminho mais excelente: a mensagem de 1Coríntios para a igreja de hoje. São Paulo: Vida Nova, 2025.
- Um chamado à justiça e retidão: a mensagem de Amós para a igreja de hoje. São Paulo: Vida Nova, 2021.
- Uma igreja complicada: a natureza do ministério cristão e a unidade da igreja segundo 1Coríntios 1–4. São Paulo: Cultura Cristã, 2011.
- Visão cristã sobre ministério pastoral. Visão Cristã.

== Tributes ==
- 2003: Trompovski Marshal Medal.
- 2017: Citizen of Goiás.
- 2019: Distinguished Visitor of Sorocaba.
