= Augustus Frederick Lindley =

- Born: 3 February 1840; London, UK
- Died: 29 March 1873 (aged 33); UK
- Military career
- Service years: Taiping reform movement 1860–1863
- Rank: Colonel in Taiping Army (self-proclaimed), June 1863
- Conflicts: Battle of Jofoolzo 九洑洲決戰, June 1863

Augustus Frederick Lindley (呤唎 "Lin-Le") 3 February 1840 – 29 March 1873, was a mid-19th-century British adventurer and writer.

== Biography ==
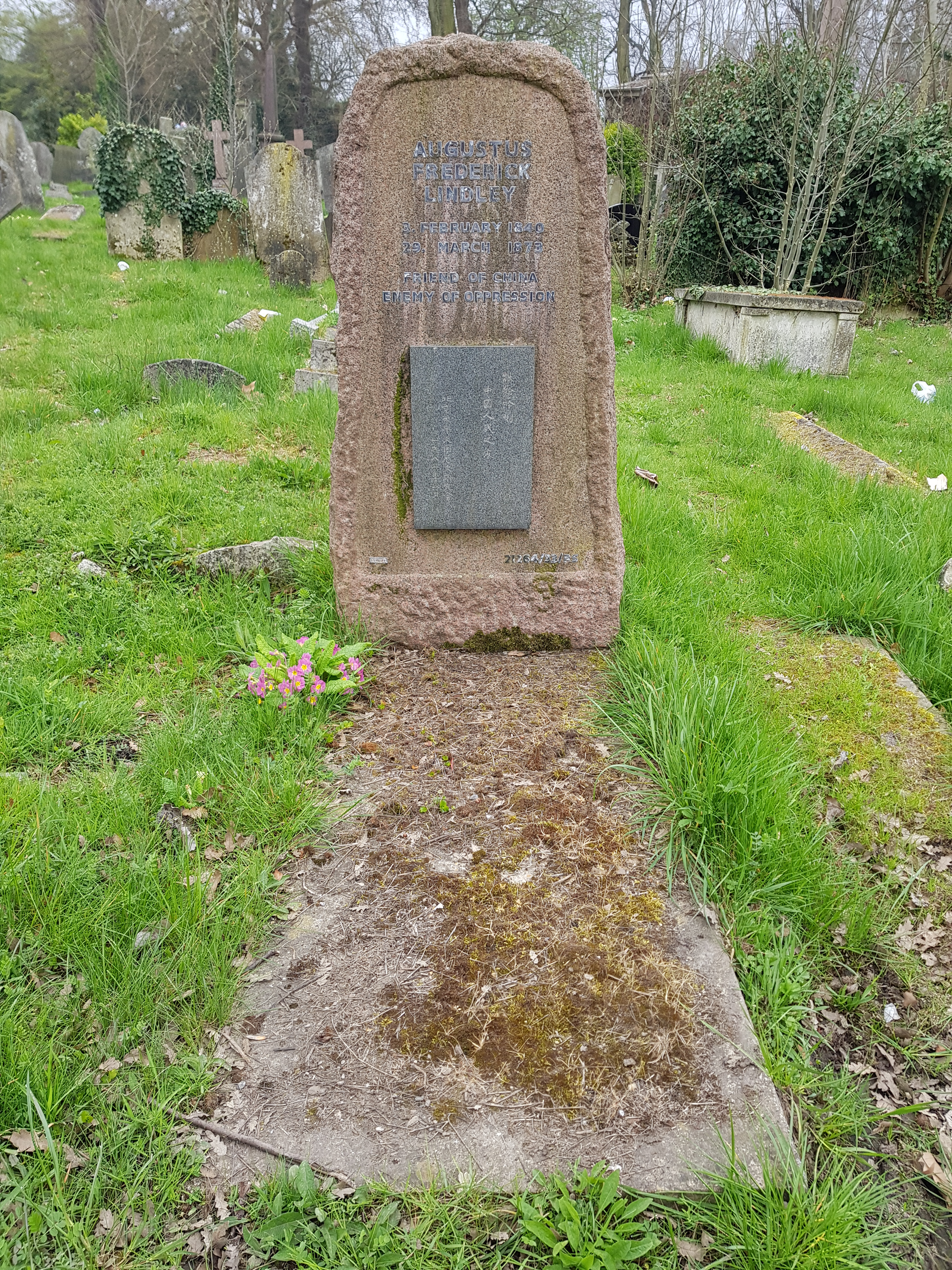
Lindley's grave at Kensal Green Cemetery in 2019

China

In 1859, Lindley was a young Royal Navy officer stationed in Hong Kong, where he became betrothed to Marie, the daughter of the Portuguese consul at Macau. In 1860 he resigned his commission, taking a job as the executive officer of a trading steamer smuggling specie to the Taiping reform movement in Shanghai. He accepted a commission from Taiping general Li Xiucheng, and helped train their soldiers in British Army techniques, while Marie became a sniper. After her death, he returned to England. In 1866, he wrote and published "Ti Ping Tien Kwoh: or the History of the Taiping Revolution". This work included a dedication: To Le-Siu-Cheng, the Chung-Wang, "Faithful Prince," Commander-in-Chief of the Ti-Ping forces, this work is dedicated if he be living; and if not, to his memory.

Battle of Jofoolzo—commanding Taiping's warships

In June 1863, Li Xiucheng commanded 250,000 troops to withdraw to Nanjing; Taiping warships bore troops across the river while tough fighting transpired between the Taiping and the Qing Army (Battle of Jofoolzo 九洑洲決戰). Lindley, as commander of the Taiping fleet, several times defeated the Qing offensive and sank many Qing warships, but he was wounded, and his wife Marie and friend Earl were killed in action. For his service, Lindley was promoted to the rank of colonel by the Taiping.

British Military Adventurism

When Charles George Gordon returned to the UK, Lindley publicly castigated Gordon in the of The Times. Lindley also published The Abyssinian War in 1868, which was critical of the invasion of Ethiopia by Sir Robert Napier.

South Africa

In 1868, Lindley, with Roger Pocklington, the American brothers Will and Tom Ashwell, and Louis de Glon of Switzerland, landed at Durban to undertake a gold-hunting expedition in the Transvaal. While no gold was found, the group travelled extensively among the Boer and the various black communities, and encountered many adventures. Pocklington married a Potchefstroom girl, and settled there. The Ashwells and de Glon took up farming in Natal; Will was later an associate of Cecil Rhodes in the consolidation of the Kimberly diamond mines. Lindley returned to England, where he wrote After Ophir, or, A Search For the South African Gold Fields, and subsequently Adamantia: the truth about the South African diamond fields which supported Boer claims to the diamond fields in Griqualand.
