= Augustus Clark =

English cricketer

Personal information
- Full name: Augustus Gilbert Finnis Clark
- Born: 31 July 1862; Dover, Kent, England
- Died: 7 May 1928 (aged 65); Hastings, Sussex, England
- Batting: Left-handed
- Bowling: Left-arm medium

Domestic team information
- Years: Team
- 1886: Sussex

Career statistics
Competition	First-class
Matches	1
Runs scored	1
Batting average	0.50
100s/50s	–/–
Top score	1
Balls bowled	36
Wickets	–
Bowling average	–
5 wickets in innings	–
10 wickets in match	–
Best bowling	–
Catches/stumpings	–/–
- Source: Cricinfo, 16 December 2011

Augustus Gilbert Finnis Clark (31 July 1862 – 7 May 1928) was an English cricketer. Clark was a left-handed batsman who bowled left-arm medium pace. He was born at Dover, Kent.

Clark made a single first-class appearance for Sussex against the Marylebone Cricket Club at Lord's in 1886. Clark batted at number ten in Sussex's first-innings and was dismissed for a single run by Jimmy Wootton. In their second-innings he batted at number four and was dismissed by the same bowler for a duck, with Sussex winning the match by 59 runs. This was his only major appearance for Sussex.

He died at Hastings, Sussex on 7 May 1928, gassing himself in his house.
