= Augustus Jesse Bowie Jr. =

American electrical engineer

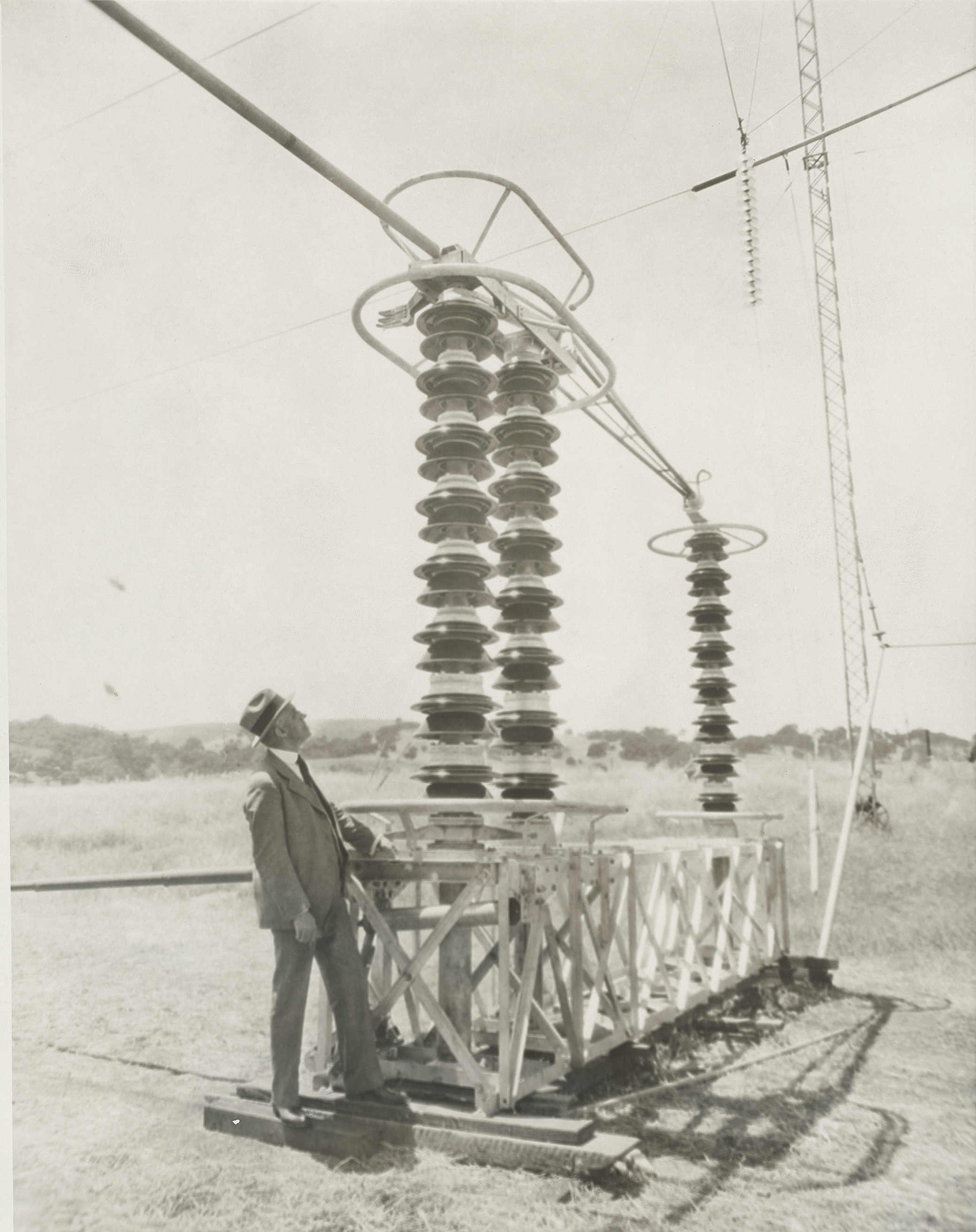
- Augustus Jesse Bowie III looks over a portion of an electrical switch he designed for use at Hoover Dam in 1934. At the time of their manufacture, these 287kv switches were by far the world's largest.
- Born: Augustus Jesse Bowie III; December 10, 1872; San Francisco, California, U.S
- Died: June 22, 1955 (aged 82); San Francisco, California, U.S
- Known for: Inventing and supplying (via the Bowie Switch Company) large-capacity electrical switches that made mass electrification possible in the Western United States

Augustus Jesse Bowie Jr. (December 10, 1872 – June 22, 1955, birth name Augustus Jesse Bowie III) was a pioneering American technology engineer, inventor and entrepreneur. His early innovations in large-capacity electrical switches, including the 1000lb. 287Kv disconnecting switch, were important in the spread of electrification on the West Coast of the United States during the 1910s-1920s, and became essential to the New Deal's mass-scale rural electrification efforts in the 1930s. Bowie was an 1896 graduate of the engineering program at MIT in Boston, the region of the United States was the center of innovation in and promulgation of electrification, which was primarily oriented towards centralized urban office/industrial use. Bowie, however, was born and bred in the San Francisco bay area of California, and his mass electrification innovations were put into use in that geographically spread out region first, allowing for the building of an electrical grid that would spawn a decentralized regional culture of technological innovation; a region eventually recognized as Silicon Valley.

Bowie leveraged his many patents in business as the founder of San Francisco's Bowie Switch Company, located in the waterfront Dogpatch district. The Bowie Switch Company would directly supply and implement his large-capacity switches for the San Francisco metro area, Hoover Dam, and Grand Coulee Dam, among many others; and during World War II the company expanded in order to produce switches for the U.S. war effort. More a businessman and inventor than an academic, Bowie's relative paucity of published writing outside electrical engineering journals (and his extensive legacy of patents) kept him largely unheralded outside electrical engineering circles following his death in 1955, despite his pivotal role in mass-scale electrification of the western United States and the bay area/Silicon Valley in particular.

== Early life and family ==
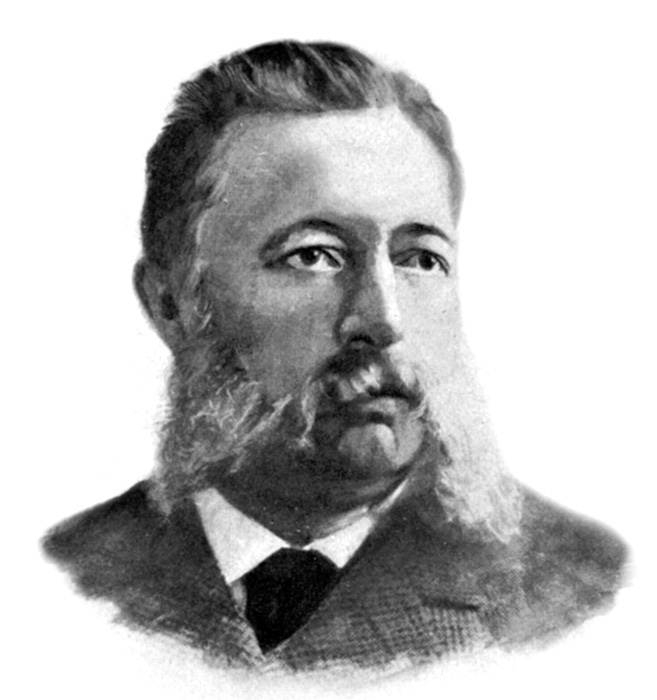
Hydraulic engineer Augustus Jesse Bowie II, photo from late 1800s (exact date unknown), University of San Francisco Archives

Augustus Jesse Bowie III was born in San Francisco, California, and generally referred to himself as Augustus Jesse Bowie Jr. He was the grandson of Dr. Augustus Jesse Bowie (October 23, 1815 – July 6, 1887), a descendant of the revolutionary period Scottish loyalist and Maryland plantation owner John Bowie. Dr. Bowie came to San Francisco in April 1849, lured by the booming economy of the California Gold Rush. An experienced orthopedic surgeon with the U.S. Navy as early as 1837, he set up a private practice in downtown San Francisco in 1851 and soon occupied a prominent place among San Francisco's arriviste elite. Named first surgeon at St. Mary's hospital in 1861 then Chair of Surgery in the Medical Department of the University of the Pacific in 1863, he was named to the then-new board of UC Regents in 1876. However, like his grandson AJ Bowie III, Dr. Bowie's lack of an academic publishing record kept him relatively under-recognized in historic terms.

Augustus Jesse Bowie III's father, Augustus Jesse Bowie II (1845–1917) was Dr. Bowie's son, and was known as Augustus Jesse Bowie Jr. (as his own son would be later). In 1863, Augustus Jesse Bowie II received the first Bachelor of Arts degree to be awarded by San Francisco's St. Ignatius College, then went to Europe, receovog received a doctorate in engineering at Heidelberg University He returned to San Francisco with his German fiancée, Eliza Friedlander, and married her there in 1870. An experienced and widely published geologist, hydrologist, and mining engineer, Bowie II wrote treatises on mining in the Sierra and irrigation in the Central Valley that are still found in print, including the seminal ''A Practical Treatise on Hydraulic Mining in California'' (pub. 1885, i online at internet archive). Bowie II and Eliza Friedlander's's eldest son was Augustus Jesse Bowie III (born in San Francisco in 1872),.

== Education ==
Like his father, Augustus Jesse Bowie III studied at Saint Ignatius College (now the University of San Francisco), following which he went east and entered Harvard College, graduating with honors and an A.B. in Mathematics in 1893. Bowie's coming of age and intellectual interests coincided with the biggest technological shift of the early 20th century – electrification. The locus of innovation in and promulgation of electrification in the United States was in the northeast, where the major players of this tech revolution were Joseph Swan, Thomas A. Edison, Nikola Tesla, and numerous others. After Harvard, Bowie III developed a strong interest in electrification and stayed in the Northeast, to pursue an S.B. in Electrical and Mechanical Engineering MIT. in 1896 he got. In his ensuing engineering and business career, Bowie III would generally identify himself by the same title as his father, Augustus Jesse Bowie Jr. This was the name under which he would also patent his inventions and eventually establish his business.

== Early career and patents ==
At some point following his graduation from MIT in 1896, A.J. Bowie III returned to California and took up residence in Sacramento, where he found work as an engineer with the Sacramento Electric, Gas and Railroad Company. Bowie was back in San Francisco by early 1906, where he filed his first patent application: a sophisticated electrical switch that would cleanly create a break in an electrical circuit, dramatically reducing the risk of damage to the electrical apparatus and/or the potential electrocution of the user. Only rudimentary means for such technology had existed up until this time.

Application filed January 23, 1906. Serial No. 297,433.

To all whom it may concern,

Be it known that I, Augustus J. Bowie, Jr., a citizen of the United States, residing in San Francisco city and county, State of California, have invented certain new and useful Improvements in Electrical Switches; and I do hereby declare the following to be and exact description of the invention, such as will enable others skilled in the art to which it appertains to make and use the same. This invention relates of electric switches; The object of the invention is to provide a switch which shall be durable and shall promptly and surely destroy arcs formed at a complete and perfect break in the circuit to be interrupted….

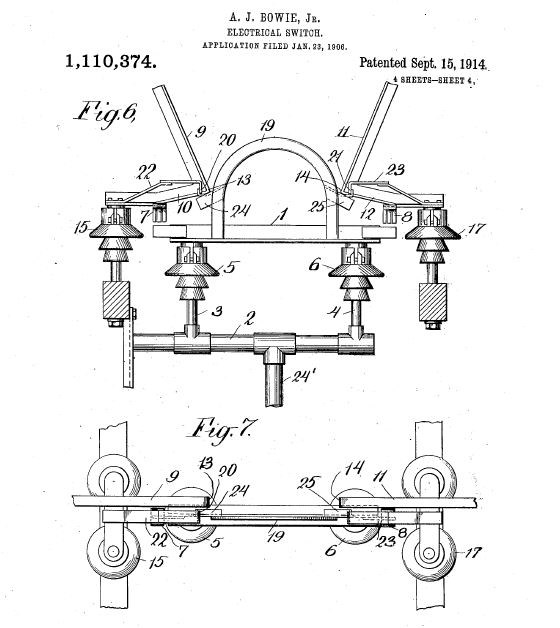
Electrical Switch diagram from US Patent 1110374 by Augustus Jesse Bowie III, 1906

Between this start in 1906 and the 1920s, Bowie was busy inventing and patenting products that helped lay the groundwork for this wider-scale electrification, the majority of which were new designs that vastly improved the safety, efficiency, and capacity of electrical current transmission. Among the most important of these patents are:

US 1110374 A: Filed January 23, 1906, pub. September 15, 1914, Electrical Switch.

US 982789 A: Filed April 18, 1907, pub. January 31, 1911, Electromagnetic Power Transmitting Mechanism. "Power transmission mechanism comprising a positively driven primary element mounted on a rotatable main shaft, and a secondary element mounted on a rotatable counter-shaft, out of alignment with the main shaft and driven therefrom, said primary and secondary elements forming an electromagnetic inductive system involving a magnet having an air gap, and an energizing coil for said magnet, and an electric conductor interposed in said air gap." --Journal of Electricity, Power, and Gas, January–June 1911

US 1230372 A: Filed December 9, 1909, pub. June 19, 1917, Electric Switch.

US 1168595 A: Filed February 26, 1910, pub. January 18, 1916, Lightning-Arrester.

US 1287851 A: Filed March 12, 1914, pub. December 17, 1918, Electric-energy converter and meter.

== Bowie Switch Company and electrification ==
While George Roe's California Electric Light Company had commenced electrification operations in San Francisco in 1879, with a capacity to light 21 lights, San Francisco did not realize a significant, widely available electrical capacity until over four decades later; partially as a result of the infrastructural devastation wrought by the earthquake of 1906. Demand for electricity, however, continued to grow exponentially. In 1920, the California Electric Light Company hosted hundreds of people (who were lined up around the block) in a showcase of the first all-electric model home, replete with dozens of new appliances that required electricity to function – electricity that was still not available in many parts of California, particularly rural areas and outlying suburbs.

With the patents he created in the first two decades of the twentieth century, AJ Bowie III was poised to leverage the market potential of demand for electricity as electrification took full force. His eponymously named Bowie Switch Company had been successfully marketing his inventions since at least 1913 and operated a facility at 18th and Folsom Streets in San Francisco, and in 1926 the company moved to a newly built factory at 815 Tennessee Street in the Dogpatch neighborhood of San Francisco. The Bowie Switch Company building, a brick-faced classic revival style structure in the utilitarian tradition, was designed by noted Swedish architect August J. Nordin, designer of the historic landmark Swedish American Hall on upper Market Street. Built to integrate production with the newly emergent long-haul trucking industry, the Bowie Switch Company building was well-positioned to distribute its products to locales both local and national, including in rural areas that were not serviced by existing rail transport networks. This broad distributive capacity, combined with rapidly increasing demand for electrification, would prove to be instrumental in positioning the Bowie Switch Company squarely in the center of the Franklin Delano Roosevelt administration's efforts in the Rural Electrification Act and related major public works in the American West during the 1930s, including designing switches for the unprecedented amount of hydropower being generated by the newly built Boulder and Grand Coulee Dams

== WPA hydropower projects (Boulder and Grand Coulee dams) ==
Electrification in the United States' urban centers became standard during the 1920s and early 1930s, while rural and suburban electrification remained largely unrealized. This was in part due to U.S. political dynamics that discouraged the use of public funds for major infrastructure projects in favor of private development, and as rural electrification was yet to be proven a profitable endeavor private enterprise ventures were unconvinced of its viability. However, while the Great Depression was in full swing, the early 1930s saw the initiation of new, publicly funded programs under President Franklin D. Roosevelt to support electrification in rural America where there was both great need and great poverty. This activity culminated in a new WPA program, the Rural Electrification Act of 1935, which extended the electrification wave beyond urban centers and across the continental United States.

The major infrastructural expansion of electrical capacity from these programs increased demand for Bowie III's products, and placed his company into an important position as a government contractor. As the 1930s began, low-voltage (2300 volt) electrical distribution systems were the standard, and they could only carry electricity about four miles before voltage drop rendered the remaining current useless for standard domestic applications. To increase the viability of high-voltage current carriage to rural and suburban areas (including outlying regions of Bowie's Bay Area home such as San Jose, Gilroy, Mountain View, Martinez, etc.), innovative (and often expensive) higher-voltage systems were needed to handle capacity for lines that would carry power over 40 miles from a station. For these new high-voltage systems, as well as centralized hydropower projects that generated unprecedented amounts of electrical current, the potential for injuries, explosions, and destruction of equipment was very high, so new high-capacity switches were required to be able to manage the power effectively and safely – the Bowie Switch Company was a locus for innovation and implementation of these switches, and the company kept very busy during the 1930s. One of Bowie's greatest achievements during this period were the innovative 287,000 volt (287kv) disconnecting switches, which at the time and for many years thereafter were by far the world's largest (in mass and capacity) and weighed over 1,000 pounds each. These switches were designed for the enormous quantity of power generated by Hoover Dam and Grand Coulee Dam, and were the only way to safely regulate the flow of electricity from the harsh environmental surroundings of their generation sites through power lines that had the capacity to carry electricity over 250 miles to urban, rural, and newly developing suburban areas.

== World War II and postwar ==
When the U.S. entered into World War II in 1941, the war effort further increased the demand for Bowie's products in both military and civilian capacities, particularly for the high voltage and safety controls (disconnecting switches) needed in the industrial-scale production of military goods, vehicles, weapons, and ships. In 1942 the Bowie Switch Co. added an assembly facility to the east, increasing the company's ability to manufacture goods at the scale and speed required by the military. On August 19, 1944, President Roosevelt issued Executive Order 9466, which directed the Secretary of the Navy "to take possession of and operate the plants and facilities of certain machine shop companies" in San Francisco, one of the 99 temporarily nationalized industries was the Bowie Switch Company of San Francisco. While the managerial structure and employees of the Bowie Switch Company remained intact during this time, the company exclusively produced products to aid the war effort.

Soon after the war's conclusion in 1945, the Bowie Switch Company (along with other temporarily nationalized industries) was brought back to full private control under A.J. Bowie Jr (A.J. Bowie III). However, by the end of the year Bowie sold Bowie Switch Company to the A.B. Chance Company of Moberly, Missouri; a sale which had been pending since 1941. At the time of sale in December 1945, the Bowie Switch Company employed approximately 70–100 people, and after the sale Bowie was kept on as a consulting engineer. World War II turned out to have been the apogee of the Bowie Switch Company, but under the ownership of A.B. Chance, it continued to produce electrical products until 1960 before ceasing operations.

== Legacy ==
Augustus Jesse Bowie Jr. (AKA Augustus Jesse Bowie III) was one of the San Francisco Bay Area's earliest technology pioneers, and his invention, marketing, and production of groundbreaking disconnecting switch technology was a key component in the spread of electrification outside city centers on the American west coast. The early development of this capacity would prove to have a lasting impact in the rural areas of the state and the sprawling, decentralized DIY technology laboratory of the bay area suburbs that would eventually become known as Silicon Valley – a metaphorically appropriate outcome, given that the binary code underlying all digital technology is based on a series of switches. As noted earlier, Bowie was highly regarded and very influential in electrical engineering circles and was sought after by planners as a top-flight engineer, but he was much more a businessman than an academic and was little-known outside his profession due to a relative lack of published materials (besides several articles in electrical engineering journals and his numerous patents).

In 1913, Bowie married his close friend Esther Donnelly (who already had a six-year-old child); however, the couple had no children of their own and divorced in 1918. AJ Bowie Jr. (III) never remarried, and died on June 22, 1955, in Children's Hospital San Francisco at the age of 82. He is buried in Colma, California.
