= Augustus Charles Bickley =

English journalist and author

Augustus Charles Bickley (1857–1902) was an English journalist and author.

== Life ==
Born in Birmingham, he was the youngest son of Francis Bickley of Carlisle, and brother of Francis Bridges Bickley of the British Museum. Their father died in London, in 1865; as a surgeon and dentist in Carlisle, he had married Harriet Bridges of Lichfield in 1851.

Bickley passed the preliminary examination for Civil Service clerks in 1876. A few years later he was working as a journalist in London.

== Works ==
Bickley wrote over 80 articles for the Dictionary of National Biography, to 1891. He encountered criticism, with his biography of Richard Carpenter (died c.1670) called too close to one written in Biographia Britannia. Other works included:

- Archibald Campbell Tait: A Sketch of the Public Life of the Late Archbishop of Canterbury (1882)
- George Fox and the Early Quakers (1884)
- Bibliographical Notes (1889), editor, vol. IX in The Gentleman's Magazine Library
- Midst Surrey Hills: A Rural Story (1890), novel
- Handfasted (1890), novel, with George S. Curryer

The Barn at Beccles (1891) was a play co-written with George Hughes.

== Family ==
Bickley married Anna Louisa Ball of Knaphill, Surrey at Woking, on 14 June 1887.
