= Augustus FitzRoy =

Augustus FitzRoy may refer to:

- Lord Augustus FitzRoy (1716–1741)
- Augustus FitzRoy, 3rd Duke of Grafton (1735–1811), British prime minister
- Augustus FitzRoy, 7th Duke of Grafton (1821–1918)
