= Augustus Fuller =

Augustus Fuller may refer to:

- Luther Fuller (Augustus Fuller, c. 1818–1841), helmsman of the steamboat Erie
- Augustus Fuller (MP) (1777–1857), British politician
