= Augustus Pope =

Augustus Pope may refer to

- Albert Augustus Pope (1843–1909), officer in the American Union Army
- Gus Pope (1898–1953), American discus thrower
