= Augustus Barber =

American businessman

Augustus "Gus" Barber
- Born: February 21, 1927; Portland, Maine, USA
- Died: November 24, 2008 (aged 81); Portland, Maine, USA
- Resting place: Riverside Cemetery, Cape Elizabeth, Maine, USA

Augustus "Gus" Barber (February 21, 1927 – November 21, 2008) was an American businessman and founder of Barber Foods.

Born in 1927 to Armenian parents who fled the Armenian genocide, Barber served in the U.S. Army during World War II and later became a ship welder at the Portland docks. In 1955 Barber opened up Barber Beef and Poultry, later to be known as Barber Foods.

Barber was one of the first meat cutters to offer cut up chicken parts such as legs and thighs while most traders offered whole chickens. In later years the company became kitchen based and had 800 employees. Half of Barber's work force were immigrants, he always had pledged to other people. He offered English lessons to his employees on site. He retired as chairman in 2002.

Barber died on November 21, 2008, after going into cardiac arrest.
