= Augustus Ricardo =

English cricketer

Personal information
- Full name: Augustus Louis Ricardo
- Born: 28 March 1843; Chelsea, London, England
- Died: 19 April 1871 (aged 28); Cologne, Rhine Province, German Empire

Domestic team information
- Years: Team
- 1861: Hampshire

Career statistics
Competition	FC
Matches	1
Runs scored	5
Batting average	5.00
100s/50s	–/–
Top score	3*
Balls bowled	224
Wickets	–
Bowling average	–
5 wickets in innings	–
10 wickets in match	–
Best bowling	–
Catches/stumpings	2/–
- Source: Cricinfo, 3 May 2010

Augustus Louis Ricardo (28 March 1843 – 19 April 1871) was an English cricketer. Ricardo was born in Chelsea, London.

Ricardo made a single first-class appearance for Hampshire in 1861 against the Marylebone Cricket Club. In the match he scored 5 runs and took 2 catches.

Ricardo died on 19 April 1871 in Cologne, German Empire.
