= Augustus de Bourbel =

English cricketer

Personal information
- Full name: Augustus Alfred de Bourbel de Montpinçon
- Born: 6 August 1834; Naples, Kingdom of the Two Sicilies
- Died: 15 May 1917 (aged 82); St Mary Bourne, Hampshire, England
- Batting: Unknown
- Relatives: Constance Wachtmeister (sister)

Domestic team information
- Years: Team
- 1854: Marylebone Cricket Club

Career statistics
Competition	First-class
Matches	1
Runs scored	12
Batting average	–
100s/50s	–/–
Top score	12*
Balls bowled	–
Wickets	–
Bowling average	–
5 wickets in innings	–
10 wickets in match	–
Best bowling	–
Catches/stumpings	2/–
- Source: Cricinfo, 25 February 2012

Auguste Alfred, vicomte de Bourbel de Montpinçon (6 August 1834 – 15 May 1917), known as Augustus de Bourbel, was an English cricketer and aristocrat. Bourbel's batting style is unknown. He was educated at Harrow School.

Bourbel made a single first-class appearance for the Marylebone Cricket Club against Cambridge University at Fenner's in 1854. Batting first, Cambridge University were dismissed for just 66, while in their first-innings, the Marylebone Cricket Club made 166, with de Bourbel, who batted at number ten, ending unbeaten on 12. Cambridge University made 104 in their second-innings, leaving the Marylebone Cricket Club just one run to win.

He died at St Mary Bourne, Hampshire on 15 May 1917.
