= Augustus Seymour =

Augustus Seymour may refer to:

- Augustus Seymour Porter (1798-1872), American mayor and politician
- Augustus Sherrill Seymour (1836–1897), American judge in North Carolina
- Augustus T. Seymour (1907–1965), American judge in New Mexico
