= Augustus George =

English cricketer

Personal information
- Full name: Augustus King George
- Born: 16 July 1817; Enfield, Middlesex, England
- Died: 6 February 1902 (aged 84); Brighton, Sussex, England
- Batting: Unknown
- Bowling: Unknown-arm slow

Domestic team information
- Years: Team
- 1844–1847: Marylebone Cricket Club

Career statistics
Competition	First-class
Matches	26
Runs scored	253
Batting average	6.17
100s/50s	–/–
Top score	33
Catches/stumpings	13/–
- Source: Cricinfo, 14 July 2019

Augustus King George (16 July 1817 – 6 February 1902) was an English first-class cricketer.

George was born at Enfield in October 1817. He made his debut in first-class cricket for the Marylebone Cricket Club against Surrey at Lord's in 1844. He played first-class cricket until 1849, making 26 appearances. In addition to playing for the Marylebone Cricket Club, he also appeared for the Gentlemen of Kent, England, the Gentlemen of England, and for the Fast bowlers in the Fast v Slow match of 1849. He scored 253 runs in his 26 first-class matches, at an average of 6.17 and a high score of 33. He died at Brighton in February 1902.
