= Augustus West =

Augustus West (March 20, 1814 in Madison County, Virginia – 1887 in Fayette County, Ohio) was an African-American landowner and abolitionist who is known for his mansion and compound in Ohio that served as a successful hiding place for runaway slaves along the underground railroad.

To finance his real estate purchases, West and abolitionist Alexander Beatty concocted a scheme in which Beatty would sell West back into slavery and then aid in his escape, splitting the profits from the sale. In 1837, after three successful scams, West had enough funds to purchase 177 acres of land in Fayette County, Ohio. There he built his mansion as well as a road known as "Abolition Lane" where 12 cabins were erected as well as a schoolhouse. Six years after moving to Ohio, he married Harriet Peyton of Culpeper, Virginia. Throughout the 1840s and 50s, these served as shelter for escaped slaves. After the Civil War, they became homes for newly emancipated citizens.

As of February 1999, archaeologists and historians have visited the property in hopes of locating artifacts from the cabins. In 2003, Ohio placed a historical marker at the site of the property to honor Augustus West's humanitarianism.
