= Augustus Osborne Lamplough =

English Orientalist painter & illustrator (1877-1930)

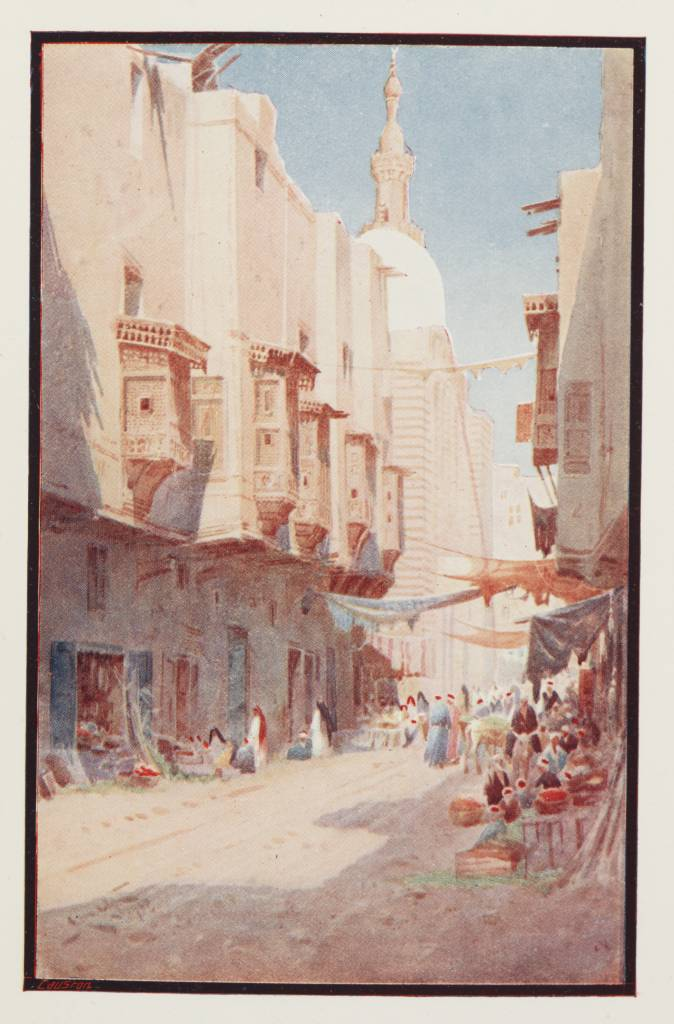
A Cairo Street Scene

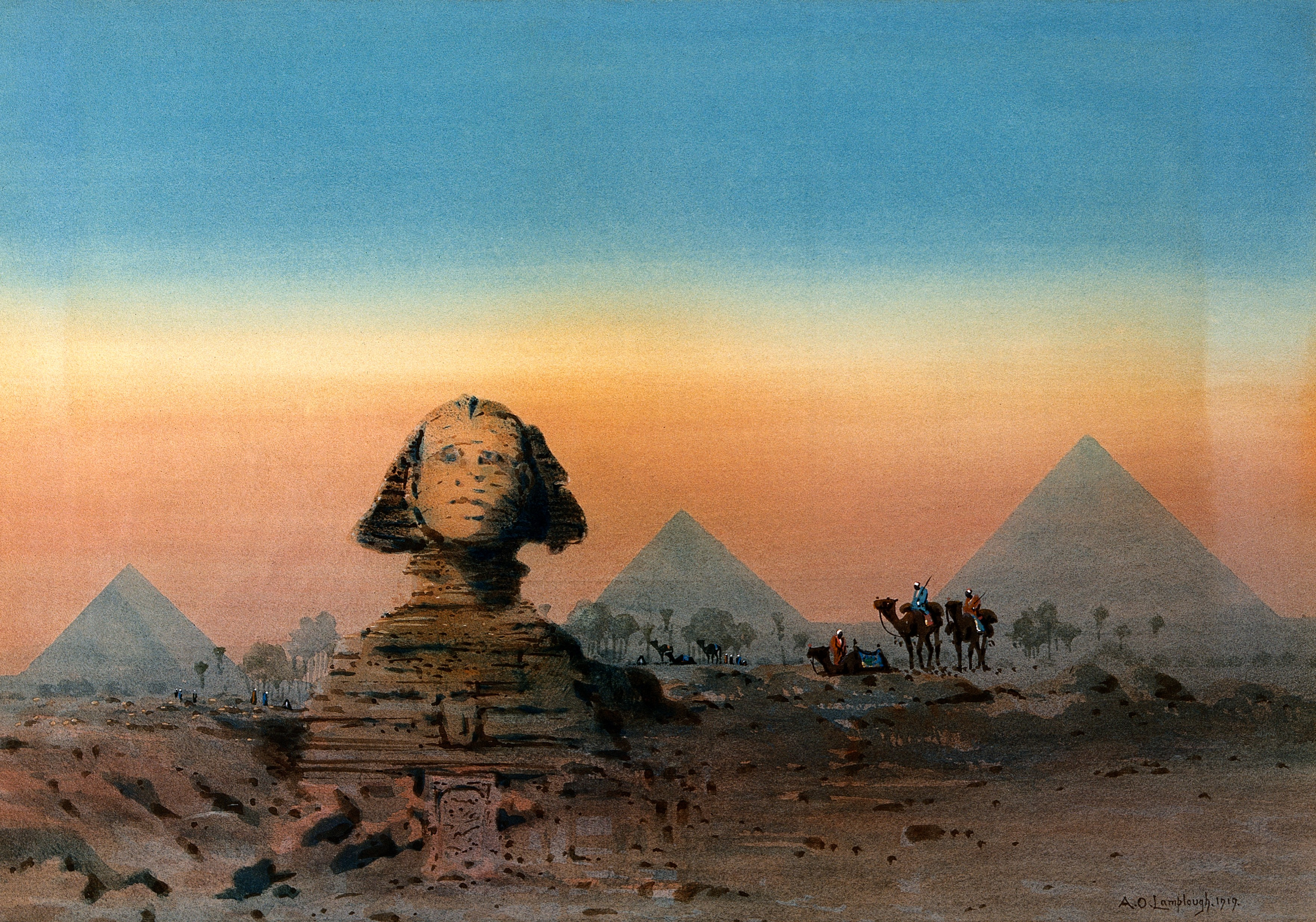
The Sphinx and the Pyramids

Augustus Osborne Lamplough (1877 in Manchester – 16 November 1930, in Bromborough) was an English Orientalist painter and illustrator; known for his scenes of North Africa. Most of his works are watercolours.

== Biography ==
He studied at the Chester School of Art. After 1898, he served as a lecturer at the Leeds School of Art. During this time, he travelled to Morocco, Algeria, Egypt, and other parts of North Africa.

He exhibited throughout the United Kingdom, and the United States; notably in New York, Philadelphia and Buffalo, at the Pan-American Exposition. Most of his early works are interiors and scenes of Venice. After 1905, he devoted himself exclusively to Orientalist scenes in subdued tones; mostly watercolors.

It was said that he painted everything as it would be seen within an hour of sunset.

== Publications ==
- Augustus Lamplough and R. Francis, "Cairo and its Environs", London, Sir Joseph Causton and sons, 1909, 191 p., 51 color plates after watercolors by the author
- Augustus Lamplough, "Egypt and How to See it", London, 1911. Reissued by Palala Press, 2015 ISBN 978-1-348-17059-4
- Pierre Loti, "Egypt (La mort de Philae)", translated from the French by William Peter Baines, with eight illustrations in colour by Augustus Lamplough, New-York, Duffield and Company, 1910. Reissued by Aeterna, 2011 ISBN 978-1-444-46102-2

== Sources ==
- Emmanuel Bénézit, Dictionnaire critique et documentaire des peintres, sculpteurs, dessinateurs et graveurs de tous les temps et de tous les pays, Paris, Gründ, 1999
- Gerald Ackerman, Les Orientalistes de l'École Britannique, ACR éditions, 1991 ISBN 978-2-86770-049-1
