= Augustus S. Johnson =

American politician

Member of the Michigan House of Representatives from the Oakland County district
- In office January 6, 1845 – March 24, 1845

Personal details
- Party: Democratic

Augustus S. Johnson was a Michigan politician.

Johnson was a Democrat. On November 4, 1844, Johnson was elected to the Michigan House of Representatives, where he represented the Oakland County district from January 6, 1845 to March 24, 1845. During his time in the legislature, he lived in Springfield Township, Oakland County, Michigan.
