= D'Agostino (disambiguation) =

D'Agostino, a Sicilian noble lineage originated at least in the thirteenth century

D'Agostino may also refer to:

- D'Agostino (surname), an Italian surname
- D'Agostino's K-squared test, a goodness-of-fit measure in statistics
- D'Agostino Supermarkets, a supermarket chain in the New York City area

== See also ==
- Agostino (disambiguation)
- De Agostini (disambiguation)
