= Agostoni =

Agostoni is an Italian surname. Notable people with the surname include:

- Carlo Agostoni (1909–1972), Italian fencer
- Silvana Agostoni, Mexican-Italian visual artist
- Ugo Agostoni (1893–1941), Italian cyclist

== See also ==
- Agostini
- Agostino (name)
