= Agostino (name) =

Agostino is both a masculine Italian given name and a patronymic surname. Notable people with the surname include:

== Given name ==
=== A ===
- Agostino Abbagnale (born 1966), Italian rower and gold medalist
- Agostino Agazzari (1578–1640), Italian composer
- Agostino Aglio (1777–1857), Italian painter, decorator, and engraver
- Agostino Agostini (died 1569), Renaissance era singer, composer, and priest
- Agostino Apollonio (fl. 1530s) was an Italian painter of the Renaissance

=== B ===
- Agostino Barbarigo (c. 1420–1501), Doge of Venice
- Agostino Barbarigo (admiral) (1516–1571), Venetian nobleman and commander
- Agostino Barelli (1627–c. 1687), Italian architect of the Baroque
- Agostino Di Bartolomei (1955–1994), Italian footballer
- Agostino Bassi (1773–1856), Italian entomologist
- Agostino Beltrano (died 1665), Italian painter active in the Baroque period in Naples
- Agostino Bernal (1587–1642), Spanish Jesuit theologian
- Agostino Bertani (1812–1886), Italian revolutionary and physician
- Agostino Bonello (born 1949), Maltese production designer, art director, and film producer
- Agostino Bonisoli (1633–1700), Italian painter of the Baroque period
- Agostino Borgato (1871–1939), Italian actor and director
- Agostino Brunias (c. 1730–1796), London-based Italian painter from Rome
- Agostino Bugiardini (died 1623), Italian sculptor active in the early-Baroque period
- Agostino Busti (c. 1483–1548), Italian sculptor of the High Renaissance

=== C ===
- Agostino Cacciavillan (1926–2022), Italian Cardinal of the Catholic Church
- Agostino Camigliano (born 1994), Italian footballer
- Agostino Campanella (fl. 1770), Italian painter and engraver
- Agostino Cardamone (born 1965), Italian boxer
- Agostino Carlini (c. 1718–1790), Italian sculptor and painter
- Agostino Carollo, Italian music producer
- Agostino Carracci (1557–1602), Italian painter and graphical artist
- Agostino Casaroli (1914–1998), Italian Catholic priest and diplomat for the Holy See
- Agostino Castellaci (born 1670–17??), Italian painter of the Baroque period
- Agostino Chigi (1466–1520), Italian banker and patron of the Renaissance
- Agostino Chiodo (1791–1861), prime minister of the Kingdom of Sardinia
- Agostino Ciampelli (1565–1630), Italian painter of the Baroque period
- Agostino Ciasca (1835–1902), Italian priest and Cardinal
- Agostino Codazzi (1793–1859), Italian military, scientist, geographer, cartographer, and governor
- Agostino Collaceroni (fl. 17th century), Italian painter, of quadratura
- Agostino Cornacchini (1686–1754), Italian sculptor and painter of the Rococo period
- Agostino Cottolengo (1794–1853), Italian painter
- Agostino Crosti (1896–1988), Italian dermatologist and professor

=== D ===
- Agostino Dati (1420–1478), Italian orator, historian, and philosopher
- Agostino Depretis (1813–1887), Italian statesman and Prime Minister

=== F ===
- Agostino Falivene (died 1548), Roman Catholic bishop
- Agostino Fantastici (1782–1845), Italian scenic designer and architect
- Agostino de Fondulis (fl. 1483–1522), Italian sculptor and architect
- Agostino Frassinetti (1897–1968) was an Italian freestyle swimmer
- Agostino Fregoso (1442–1486) was an Italian condottiero

=== G ===
- Agostino Galamini (1553–1639), Italian cardinal and bishop
- Agostino Gallo (1499–1570), Italian agronomist
- Agostino Garofalo (born 1984), Italian footballer
- Agostino Gemelli (1878–1959), Italian Franciscan friar, physician, and psychologist
- Agostino Ghesini (born 1958), Italian javelin thrower
- Agostino Giuntoli (1903–1992), Italian-born American nightclub owner and entrepreneur
- Agostino Giustiniani (1470–1536), Italian Catholic bishop, linguist and geographer

=== I ===
- Agostino Imondi (fl. 2000s), Italian documentary film director

=== L ===
- Agostino Lamma (1636–1700), Italian painter, active in Venice and specializing in battle paintings
- Agostino Lanfranchi (1892–1963), Italian bobsledder and skeleton racer
- Agostino Lanzillo (1886–1952), Italian revolutionary syndicalist leader
- Agostino Lo Piano Pomar (1871–1927), Sicilian lawyer, socialist, and politician

=== M ===
- Agostino Maccari (17th Century), Italian astronomer
- Agostino Magliani (1824–1891), Italian financier
- Agostino Marti (1485–1537), Italian painter
- Agostino Masucci (c. 1691–1758), Italian painter of the late-Baroque or Rococo period
- Agostino Melissi (1615–1683), Italian painter of the Baroque period
- Agostino Mitelli (1609–1660), Italian painter of the Baroque period

=== N ===
- Agostino Nifo (c. 1473–1538 or 1545), Italian philosopher and commentator
- Agostino Novello (1240–1309), Italian religious figure

=== P ===
- Agostino Paradisi (1736–1783), Italian poet, economist, and teacher
- Agostino Podestà (1905–1969), Italian fascist

=== R ===
- Agostino Ramelli (1531–c. 1610), Italian engineer
- Agostino Recuperati (died 1540), Italian preacher
- Agostino Richelmy (1850–1923), Italian Cardinal of the Roman Catholic Church
- Agostino Rocca (1895–1978), Italian businessman
- Agostino Roscelli (1818–1902), Italian priest and saint
- Agostino Rovere (1804–1865), Italian operatic bass

=== S ===
- Agostino Scilla (1629–1700), Italian painter, paleontologist, geologist, and pioneer in the study of fossils
- Agostino da Siena (c. 1285–c. 1347), Italian architect and sculptor
- Agostino Spinola (c. 1482–1537), Italian Roman Catholic bishop and cardinal
- Agostino Steffani (1654–1728), Italian diplomat and composer
- Agostino Steuco (1497–1548), Italian humanist, Old Testament scholar, polemicist, and antiquarian
- Agostino Straulino (1914–2004), Italian sailor and sailboat racer

=== T ===
- Agostino Tassi (1578–1644), Italian painter
- Agostino Todaro (1818–1892), Italian botanist
- Agostino Trivulzio (c. 1485–1548), Italian Cardinal and papal legate

=== V ===
- Agostino Valier (1531–1606), Italian cardinal and bishop of Verona
- Agostino Vallini (born 1940), Italian cardinal of the Roman Catholic Church
- Agostino Veneziano (c. 1490–c. 1540), Italian engraver of the Renaissance
- Agostino Veracini (1689–1762), Italian painter and engraver
- Agostino Vespucci, Florentine chancellery official and government clerk

== Surname ==
- Barbara Agostino (born 1982), Luxembourgish politician
- Dominic Agostino (1959–2004), Canadian politician
- Giuseppe Agostino (1928–2014), Italian Roman Catholic archbishop
- Kenny Agostino (born 1992), American ice hockey player
- Paolo Agostino (c. 1583–1629), Italian composer and organist of the early Baroque era
- Paul Agostino (born 1975), Australian footballer

== See also ==
- D'Agostino
