= Agostino =

Agostino may refer to:

- Agostino (name)
- Agostino (film), an Italian film directed by Mauro Bolognini
- Agostino (novel), a short novel by Alberto Moravia
- MV Agostino, an Italian coaster

== See also ==
- Agostini (disambiguation)
- D'Agostino (disambiguation)
- Augustino (disambiguation)
- Sant'Agostino (disambiguation)
