= Apollonio =

Apollonio may refer to:

== Given name ==
- Apollonios of Kition, ancient Greek physician
- Apollonio Buonfratelli, Italian renaissance miniature painter

== Surname ==
- Giorgia Apollonio (b. 1988), Italian curler
- Federica Apollonio (b. 1991), Italian curler
- Nicholas Apollonio, (1843–1911) American baseball franchise owner
- Zvest Apollonio, (1935–2009) Slovenian painter
- Giacomo Apollonio, (1584–1654) Italian painter
- Agostino Apollonio, Italian renaissance painter

== See also ==
- Apolonio, a 2020 mixtape by Omar Apollo
