= D'Agostino (surname) =

D'Agostino is an Italian surname. Notable people with the surname include:

- Abbey D'Agostino (born 1992), American athlete
- Anthony D'Agostino (1931–2017), Italian and American marine biologist
- Antonino D'Agostino (born 1978), Italian footballer
- Colleen D'Agostino, American musician and singer-songwriter
- Francesco D'Agostino (1946–2022), Italian jurist
- Frank D'Agostino (1934–1997), American football player
- Gaetano D'Agostino (born 1982), Italian footballer
- Gigi D'Agostino (born 1967), Italian DJ
- Jeff D'Agostino (born 1982), American actor
- John D'Agostino (financial services), American businessman and developer of commodity exchanges
- John D'Agostino (poker player) (born 1982), American professional poker player
- Jon D'Agostino (1929–2010), American comic book artist
- Nicholas D'Agostino (soccer) (born 1998), Australian professional footballer
- Nicholas D'Agostino Sr. (1910–1996), co-founder of D'Agostino Supermarkets
- Oscar D'Agostino (1901–1975) Italian chemist, collaborator of Enrico Fermi
- Peppino D'Agostino (born 1956), Italian musician
- Ralph B. D'Agostino (born 1940), American statistician
- Rebecca D'Agostino (born 1982), Maltese footballer

== See also ==
- D'Agostini
- D'Agostino (disambiguation)
- Michael Dagostino, Australian art curator
