= Agostini (disambiguation) =

- Agostini, Italian surname
- Agostini Fjord, a fjord in Tierra del Fuego
- Agostini v. Felton, a landmark decision of the Supreme Court of the United States
- Agostini's reaction, a simple medical test for the presence of glucose in urine
- Casa Agostini, a Classical Revival house designed by Miguel Briganti Pinti

== See also ==
- Agostino (disambiguation)
- De Agostini (disambiguation)
