= John D'Agostino =

John D'Agostino may refer to:

- John D'Agostino (financial services), American entrepreneur and former hedge fund manager
- John D'Agostino (poker player) (born 1982), American professional poker player
- Jon D'Agostino (John P. D'Agostino Sr., 1929–2010), Italian-American comic-book artist

== See also ==
- D'Agostino
