= Sant'Agostino =

Sant'Agostino or Santagostino may refer to:

== Film ==
- Augustine: The Decline of the Roman Empire (Italian: Sant'Agostino)

== Churches in Italy ==
- Sant'Agostino, Cesena
- Chiesa Parrocchiale di Sant'Agostino, Ferrara
- Sant'Agostino (Genoa)
- Sant'Agostino, Gubbio
- Sant'Agostino, Lucca
- Sant'Agostino, Massa Marittima
- Sant'Agostino, Matelica
- Sant'Agostino, Modena
- Sant'Agostino, Montalcino
- Sant'Agostino alla Zecca, Naples (Sant'Agostino Maggiore)
- Sant'Agostino, Palermo
- Sant'Agostino, Piacenza
- Sant'Agostino, Prato
- Sant'Agostino, Rimini
- Basilica of Sant'Agostino, Rome
- Sant'Agostino, San Gimignano
- Sant'Agostino (Siena)

== Other ==
- Santagostino (surname)
- Sant'Agostino (Milan Metro), a Milan Metro station
- Sant'Agostino, Emilia–Romagna, a comune or town in Italy
