= De Agostini (surname) =

De Agostini is a surname of Italian origin. Notable people with the surname include:

- Alberto Maria de Agostini (1883–1960), Italian missionary, explorer and geographer
- Giovanni Maria de Agostini (1801–1869), lay monk of Italian origin
- Luigi De Agostini (born 1961), Italian footballer
- Doris de Agostini (1958–2020), Swiss skier

== See also ==
- De Agostini (disambiguation)
- Agostini
