= Maccari =

Maccari is an Italian surname. Notable people with the surname include:

- Agostino Maccari, Italian astronomer
- Cesare Maccari (1840–1919), Italian painter of the nineteenth century
- Filippo Maccari (1705–1800), Italian painter and scenic designer
- Giacomo Maccari (c. 1700–after 1744), Italian opera composer
- Mateo Maccari (born 2000), Argentine footballer
- Mino Maccari (1898–1989), Italian painter
- Murilo Maccari (born 1987), Brazilian footballer
- Patrick Maccari (born 1951), French slalom canoeist
- Ruggero Maccari (1919–1989), Italian screenwriter
- Sofía Maccari (born 1984), Argentine Olympic field hockey player
