= Nicholas D'Agostino =

Nicholas D'Agostino may refer to:

- Nicholas D'Agostino Sr. (1910–1996), American supermarket magnate
- Nicholas D'Agostino (soccer) (born 1998), Australian soccer player
