= D'Agostini =

Italian surname

D'Agostini is an Italian surname. Notable people with the surname include:

- Franca D'Agostini (born 1952), Italian philosopher
- Matt D'Agostini (born 1986), Canadian ice hockey player
- Miriam D'Agostini (born 1978), Brazilian tennis player

== See also ==
- D'Agostino (surname)
