= San Pietro all'Orto =

Former church and convent in Massa Marittima, Italy

Coordinates: 43°03′05″N 10°53′33″E

- Church and convent of San Pietro all'Orto
- Chiesa e convento di San Pietro all'Orto (Italian)
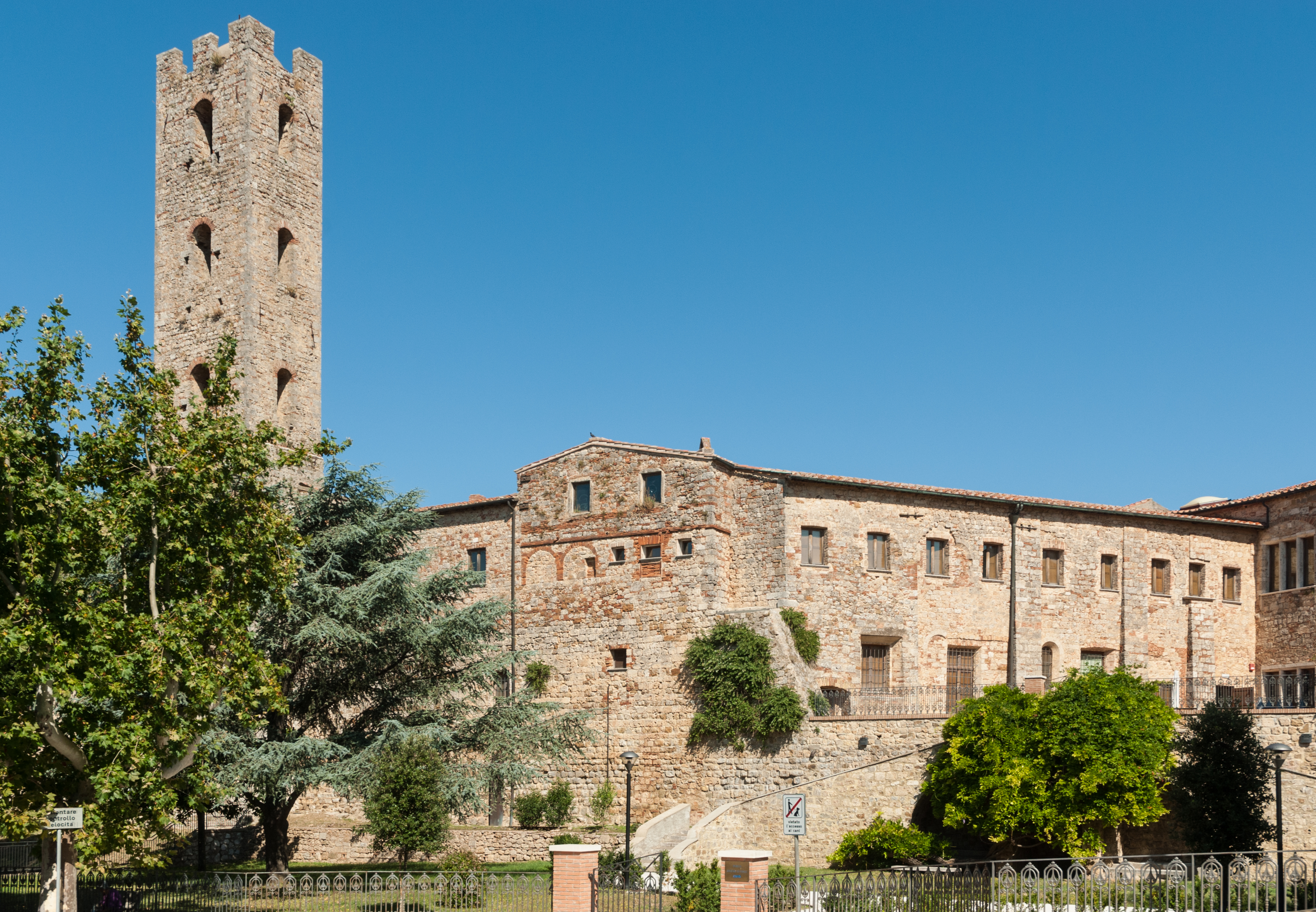
- San Pietro all'Orto
- Location: Massa Marittima, Province of Grosseto, Tuscany
- Country: Italy

History
- Status: Former church and convent

Architecture
- Functional status: Secularized

San Pietro all'Orto is a former Roman Catholic church and convent in Massa Marittima, Tuscany, Italy. Dating from 1197, it is considered one of the oldest churches in the town.

During the first half of the 13th century, San Pietro all'Orto served as the cathedral of Massa Marittima. In 1273, the complex was transferred to the Augustinian Order, which established a convent on the site. Following the construction of the adjacent church of Sant'Agostino in 1312, San Pietro all'Orto became an oratory and was later incorporated into the convent buildings.

In the 19th century, the complex became property of the municipality and was used as a school. Today, the former church houses the headquarters of the Terziere di Città Nuova and the Santa Cecilia Organ Museum, while the convent contains the Museum of Sacred Art.
