= Bugnara =

- Comune
- Comune di Bugnara

- Coat of arms

- Location within Italy Location within Abruzzo
- Coordinates: 42°1′29″N 13°51′44″E
- Country: Italy
- Region: Abruzzo
- Province: L'Aquila (AQ)
- Frazioni: Torre dei Nolfi, Faiella, Paccucci, Stazione Anversa, Vallecorvo

Government
  - Mayor: Domenico Taglieri

Area
  - Total: 25.80 km^{2} (9.96 sq mi)
- Elevation: 580 m (1,900 ft)

Population (30 April 2016)
  - Total: 1,112
  - Density: 43.10/km^{2} (111.6/sq mi)
- Demonym: Bugnaresi
- Time zone: UTC+1 (CET)
  - Summer (DST): UTC+2 (CEST)
- Postal code: 67030
- Dialing code: 0864
- Saint day: 4 and 5 September
- Website: Official website

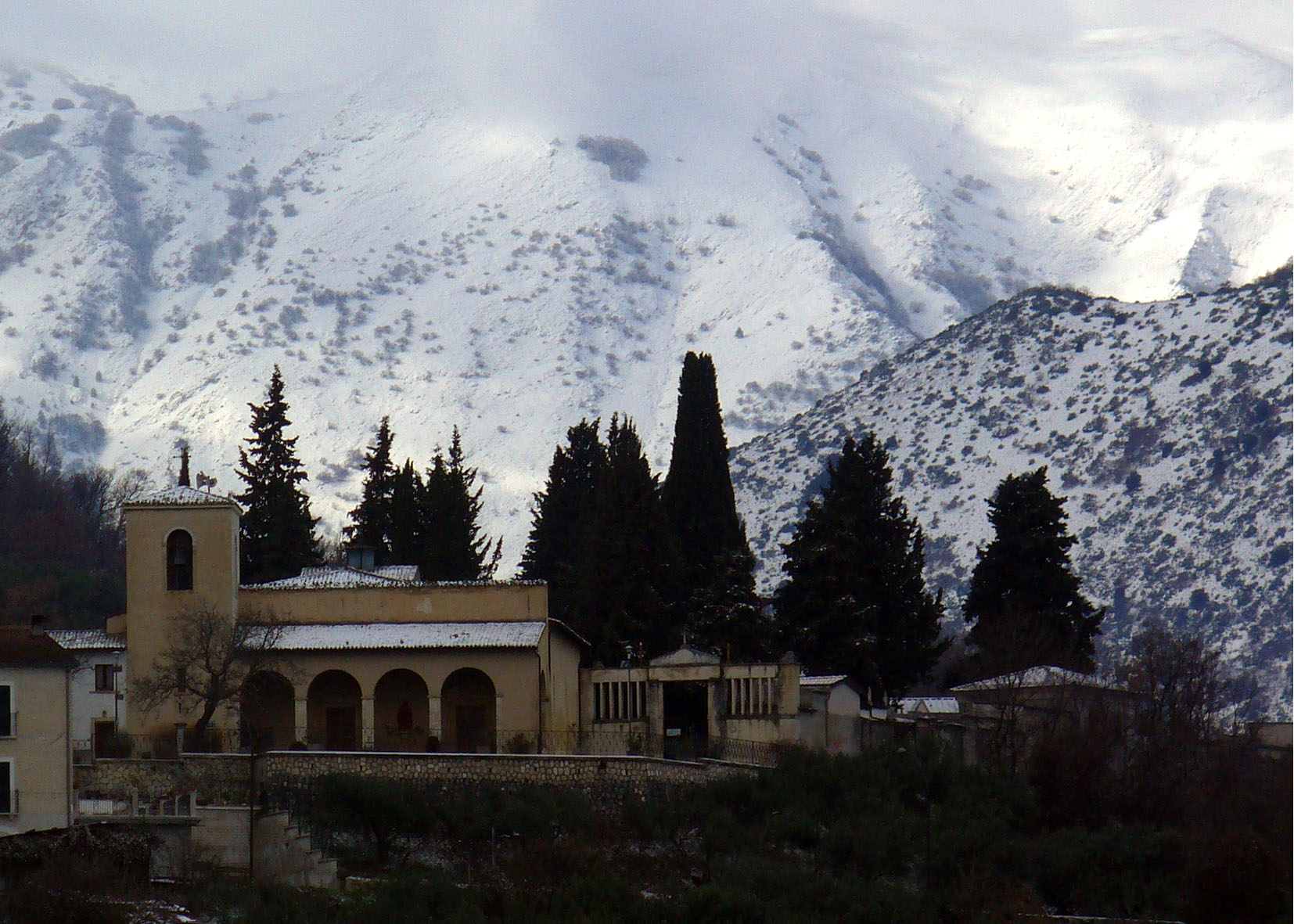
Madonna della Neve church, in winter.

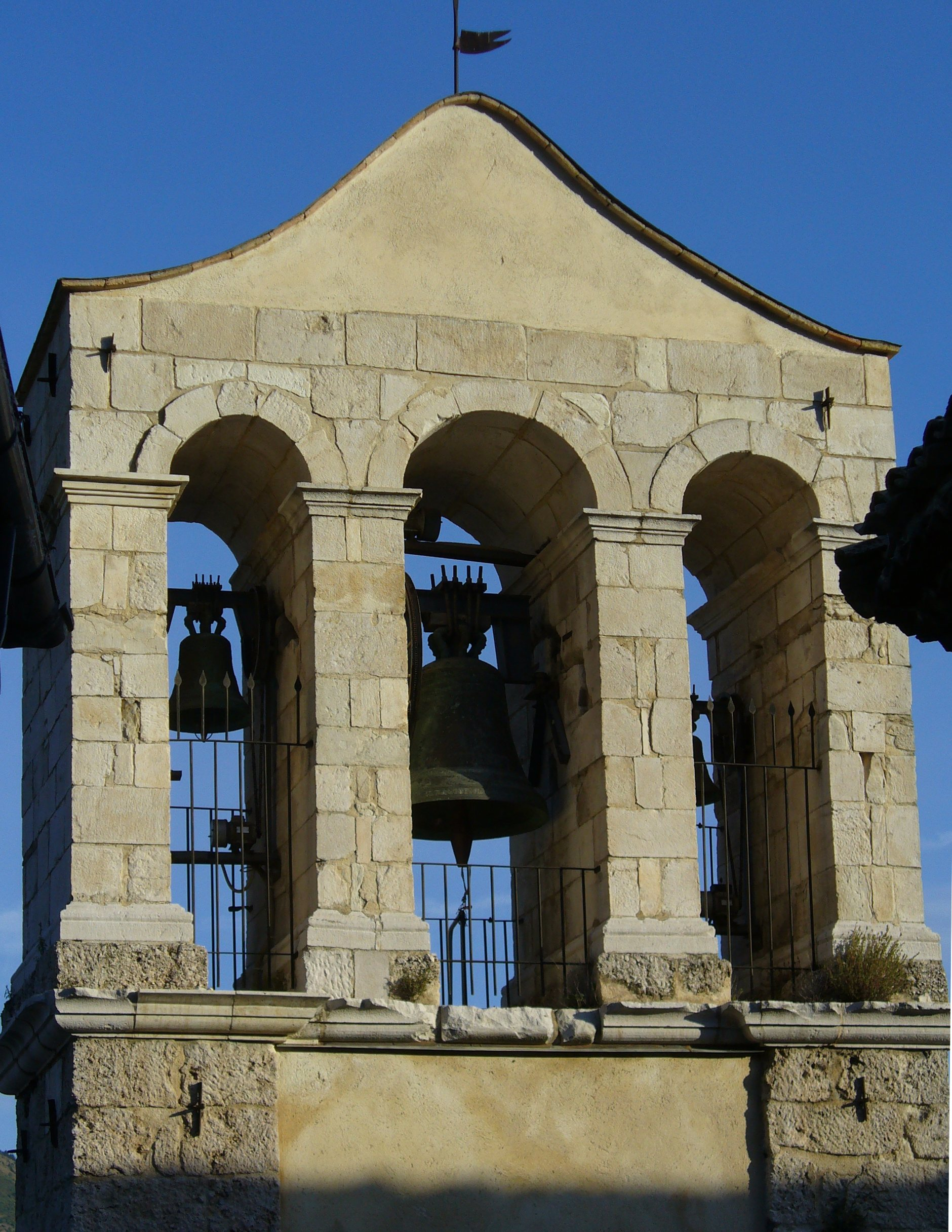
Bell tower of SS Rosario, the main church in Bugnara.

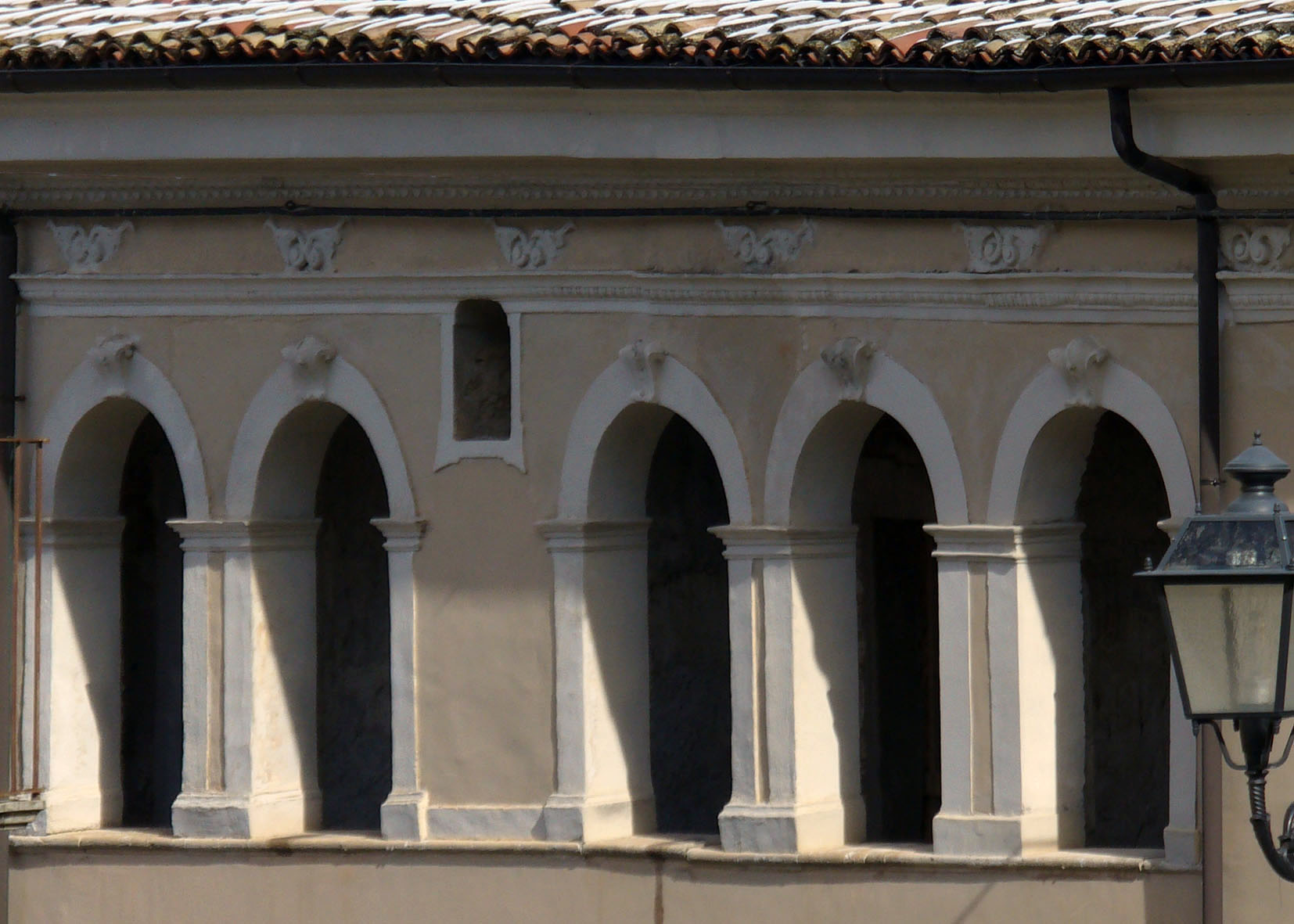
Double trifora in the façade of Palazzo Alesi.

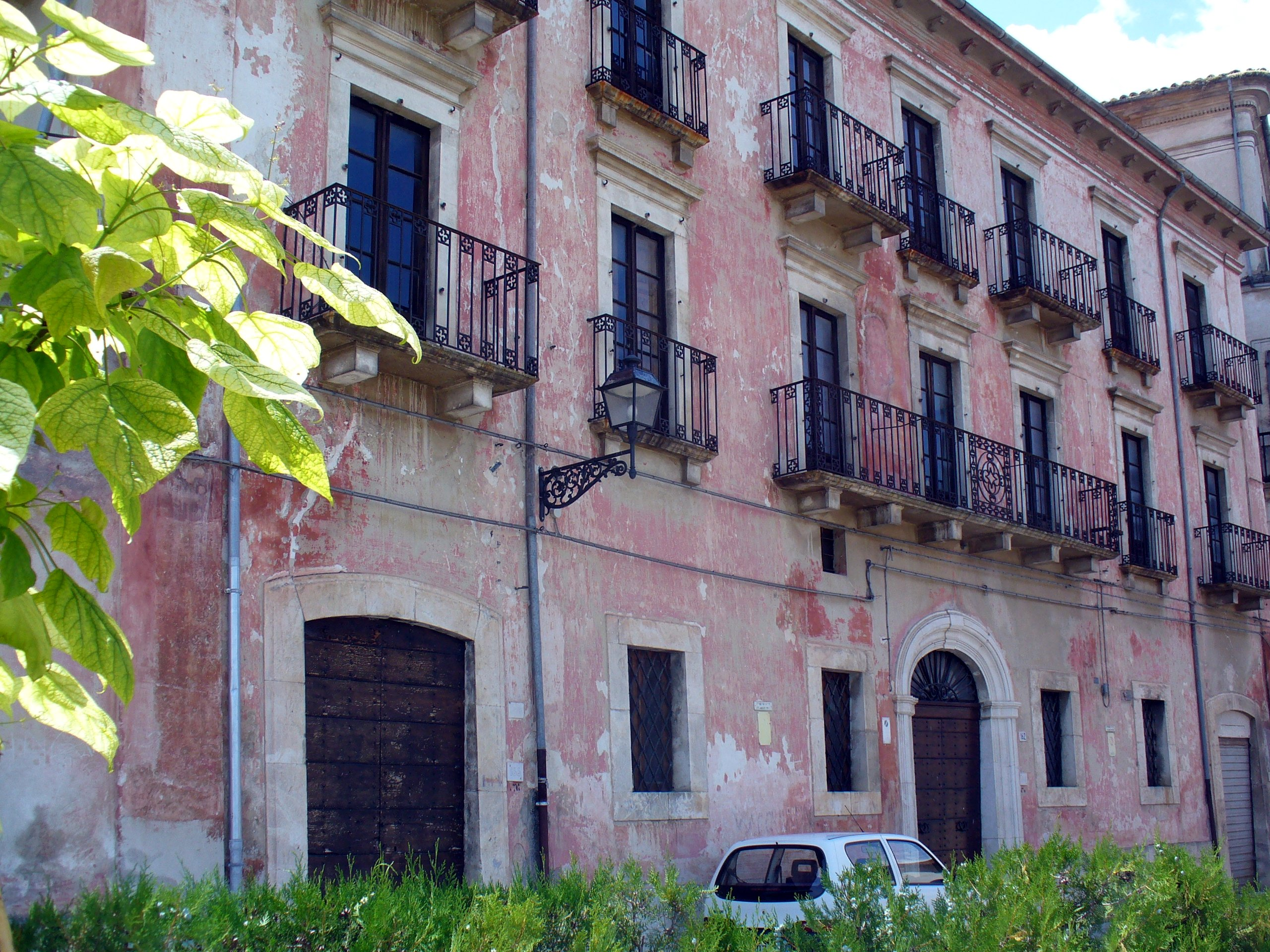
Palazzo Corrado.

Bugnara is a comune and village in the province of L'Aquila in the Abruzzo region of central Italy. It is one of I Borghi più belli d'Italia ("The most beautiful villages of Italy").

== Geography ==
Coming from the direction of the gorge of the Sagittario river, Bugnara is the first village in the conch-shaped Peligna valley. It is on the ancient Samnite road which leads to Scanno and Villetta Barrea.

The village is between local hub Sulmona and the tourist destination of Scanno. Buses run from Scanno, past Bugnara, and on to Sulmona and Rome.

Bugnara is at the foot of Colle Rotondo, elevation 912 metres (2,992 ft) above sea level and Monte Genzana at more than 2,000 metres (6,600 ft), a ridge which runs from Scanno to Introdacqua. Trails lead up the mountain from Bugnara. Its territory goes up to the Sagittario river to the north. It overlooks the whole Peligna valley, with its buildings clustered around the Ducal Castle, known as the Castello Ducale or the Rocca dello Scorpione.

Bugnara is near the Gran Sasso d'Italia, which is the largest Italian mountain south of the Alps. Bugnara is also near the ski resort of Roccaraso. The most notable hamlet belonging to Bugnara is Torre dei Nolfi.

== Name origins ==
Although no one knows for certain the origins of the name Bugnara, one hypothesis derives the term from "Bonae Ara", indicating an altar dedicated to the good mother goddess Bona or Ceres. This is supported by the fact that a pagan temple once stood where the Madonna della Neve church now stands. The temple's Roman flooring is still visible today in a herringbone pattern or Opus spicatum. A carving found at the site has decorations showing priestesses undertaking a rite.

Another hypothesis is that Bugnara comes from "Vignae Ara", thanks to the cultivation of vines around the village.

== History ==
The earliest documented evidence of Bugnara dates to the 6th century, although archaeological finds show that the settlement was inhabited much earlier. In the year 1000 AD, the Madonna della Neve church was built. In 1079 the borgo (fortified settlement) became the fiefdom of Simone di Sangro. It remained with the Sangro family until the extinction of their line in 1759 with Vittoria Mariconda di Sangro. In the 11th century, the ducal palace or Palazzo Ducale was built by the Sangro family. They also rebuilt the Madonna della Neve church in 1361. The Sangros' power spread into the neighbouring settlements of Anversa degli Abruzzi, Frattura, Chiarana, but they didn't succeed in holding these territories.

In 1442, a feudal tribute called the Regia Dogana della Mena delle Pecore di Foggia was imposed. This had a major impact on Bugnara, given that it was dependent on agriculture. In 1706, 1933 and 1984, Bugnara was hit by major earthquakes. In particular, the 1984 earthquake affected the village, and the historic churches of Bugnara were inaccessible for a long time afterwards.

In 1891, a train line and station were built by Bugnara. The tall rail bridge over the Sagittario was blown up during World War II, since it was seen as a link to Rome. The bridge was later reconstructed.

In 1974, an important historic and artistic artefact was rediscovered: the 13th-century sculpture of the Virgin and Child called the Madonna delle Concanelle from the Madonna della Neve church. It is now conserved in the National Museum of Abruzzo which is housed in the Forte Spagnolo in L'Aquila.

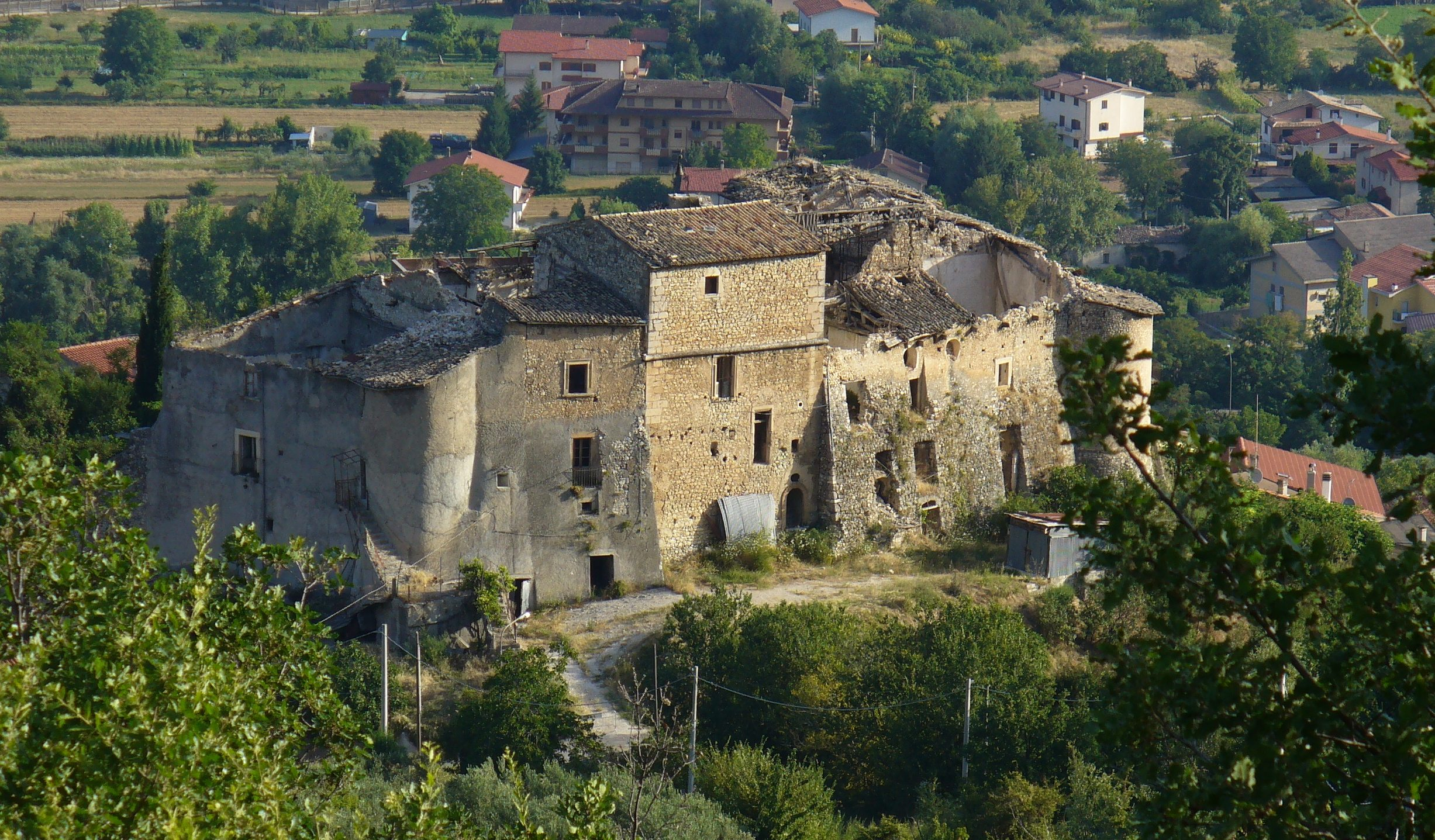
Bugnara castle from above, after the 2009 Abruzzo earthquake

== Urban layout ==
The village takes the triangular format typical of the Mediaeval period. The houses, built entirely in stone, were constructed one against the other. Narrow streets climb toward the top of the village, where the castle sits. Around the village are tratturi, pastoral routes for the migration of sheep between summer and winter pastures. These would have been heavily used in times gone by.

== Main sights ==
=== Churches ===
- Madonna della Neve. The church, also known as the Madonna delle Concanelle, has three naves, supported by gothic arches. Tradition states that the church was built on the site of a pagan temple dedicated to Ceres, who was worshiped by the Peligna valley people in thanks for the harvest. This hypothesis was supported by the finding of two carvings showing a priestess, named on one carving as Helvia, and on the other carving shown performing a rite.
- Santissimo Rosario church. The church sits in the piazza of the same name and was built between the 16th century and the 17th century. The single-nave Baroque interior is bright and colourful with a carved wooden pulpit, marble sculptures, gilded detail, frescoes and 16th-century stucco decoration. The highlight is the carved marble altar. With its many colours and sense of motion, it is a prime example of the Abruzzan Baroque style.
- Madonna degli Angeli church. Found near the Madonna della Neve church, this small 14th-century church holds a frescoed triptych about the Madonna.
- Madonna delle Grazie church. Located in the suburb of the same name, this church is linked to the railway workers of the nearby station.
- San Francesco da Paola church. This chapel is in the Pescara suburb of the territory and belonged to the Paparelli-Corrado family. The priest Angelo Paparelli had it built in 1818.
- Santa Maria della Pace church. Also known as Santa Maria di Pietraluna, this church is found in Torre dei Nolfi, a hamlet within the territory of Bugnara. It was built by local residents in 1871.
- Madonna del Buon Consiglio church. Also at Torre dei Nolfi, this church was the property of the Alesi di Villapiana barons.
- San Giuseppe church. Found in the hamlet of the same name, on the banks of the Sagittario river, this small church has been recently restored.

=== Civic and fortified buildings ===
- Ducal palace or Palazzo Ducale di Sangro, also known as Rocca dello Scorpione and Castello Ducale Medievale. The large castle at the summit of the village was built in the 12th century by the di Sangro family, who inhabited it until 1500 AD. It is walled, with two towers. It offered protection to the people of Bugnara under siege.
- Palazzo Corrado
- Palazzo Alesi Villapiana
- Palazzo Papi

=== Archaeological sites ===
- Roman villa in the Santo Stefano zone of Bugnara, identified by historian Antonio De Nino in 1887. De Nino described a settlement with a wine cellar and Roman inscriptions. In 1980–1981, excavations uncovered walls in opus incertum, columns, anfora, herringbone floors in opus spicatum, and seven dolia (large earthenware containers) which would be typical of a country villa.

== Culture ==
Events in the village include:

- Romantica and the International Florists' Festival. Called "Hearts under the stars", Romantica is an all-night celebration with various specialty drink and food stalls, dancing, live music, a catwalk show, floral displays, theatrical events and photo exhibitions. Florists from all the world compete to decorate the historic town centre of Bugnara.
- Sagra del Formaggio Pecorino di Bugnara. A 'sagra' is a celebration of a special local product. They are common in the summer in Abruzzo. This event is dedicated to Bugnara's most archetypal product: Pecorino cheese, a hard, full-flavoured, sheep's milk cheese. Bugnara Pecorino originates in rich mountain pastures where specific herbs grow.
- Sagra del Grano. This event in Bugnara's hamlet of Torre dei Nolfi celebrates the shared customs of an agricultural community, re-enacting the ancient tradition of trebbiatura or threshing of the grain using antique tools of the pre-industrial era. There are food stalls with local specialities.
- Fiera del Gusto e della Solidarietà (Italian or "Christmas Market of Flavours and Solidarity"). The aim of this pre-Christmas event is to collect money for a charity which is chosen each year. Every organisation, school and other body of Bugnara arranges a market stall with artigianal products or foods.

== People ==
- Pasquale (1905–1960) and Nicola D'Agostino (1910–1996), founders of D'Agostino Supermarkets in New York City
- Annibale de Gasparis (1819–1892), astronomer who discovered numerous asteroids

== Demography ==
Bugnara's population (as collected in the census and reported by Istat) reached a peak of just over 3,000 between 1900 and 1930. However, the difficulty of life in the post-war era led to dramatic emigration in the 1950s and 1960s. Bugnara's population has been just over 1,000 since the 1971 census.

== See also ==
- Abruzzo (wine)
