= Agostini =

Agostini is an Italian patronymic surname. Notable people with the surname include:

- Adelcira Agostini de Muñoz (1863–1969), Austrian-born Argentine physician
- Agostini Di Bartolomei (1955–1994), Italian football midfielder
- Agostini Lanfranchi (1892–1963), Italian bobsledder
- Agostino Agostini (died 1569), Italian singer, composer, and priest
- Alberto María de Agostini (1893–1960), Italian priest and explorer
- Alessandro Agostini (born 1979), Italian football player
- Amedeo Agostini (1892–1958), Italian mathematician
- Angela Agostini (1880–?), Italian botanist and mycologist
- Angelo Agostini (1843–1910), Italian-Brazilian journalist and cartoonist
- Angelo Agostini Mazzinghi, Blessed (1385–1438), Italian Roman Catholic priest
- Carlo Agostini (1888–1952), Italian Roman Catholic Patriarch of Venice
- Dante Agostini (1921–1980), Italian-born French drummer and drumming teacher
- Dante Agostini (canoeist) (born 1923), Italian sprint canoeist
- Domenico Agostini (1825–1891), Italian Roman Catholic Cardinal and Patriarch of Venice
- Doris de Agostini (1958–2020), Swiss alpine skier
- Duilio Agostini (1926–2008), Italian Grand Prix motorcycle road racer
- Fanny Agostini (born 1988), French journalist and TV presenter
- Getulio Agostini (1943–1990), Venezuelan botanist and professor
- Giacomo Agostini (born 1942), Italian motorcycle racer
- Jorge Agostini (1910–1955), Cuban fencer
- Leonardo Agostini (1593–1669), Italian antiquary
- Linda Agostini (1905–1934), British murder victim
- Lodovico Agostini (1534–1590), Italian composer
- Lucio Agostini (1913–1996), Italian-Canadian composer and conductor
- Ludovico Agostini (1536–1609), Italian writer
- Luigi De Agostini (born 1961), Italian football player
- Marianna Agostini (born 2002), Italian para-cyclist
- Massimo Agostini (born 1964), Italian football player
- Mauro Agostini (born 1989), Argentine racing cyclist
- Mike Agostini (1935–2016), Trinidad and Tobago athlete
- Paolo Agostini (1583–1629), Italian composer and organist
- Peter Agostini (1913–1993), American sculptor
- Philippe Agostini (1910–2001), French cinematographer, director, and screenwriter
- Pierre Agostini (born 1941), French physicist
- Riccardo Agostini (born 1994), Italian racing driver
- Stefano Agostini (cardinal) (1614–1683), Italian Roman Catholic cardinal
- Stefano Agostini (cyclist) (born 1989), Italian road cyclist
- Suzana Agostini (1982–2025), Brazilian football player
- Zefirino Agostini (1813–1896), Italian Roman Catholic priest
