= Franca D'Agostini =

Italian philosopher (born 1952)

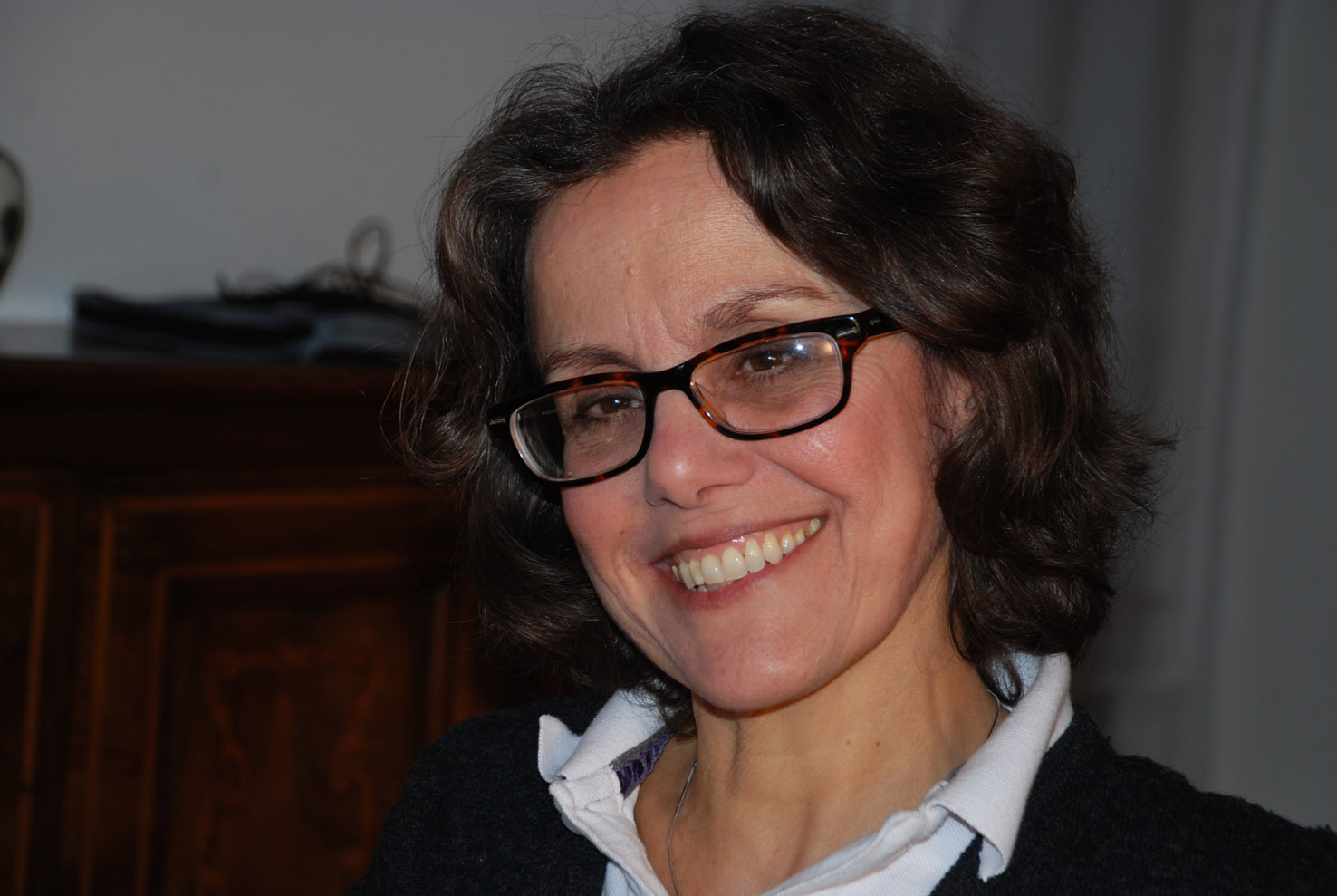
- Born: September 11, 1952 (age 74); Turin, Italy

Academic background
- Education: University of Turin (BA, MA, PhD)

Academic work
- Discipline: Philosopher
- Institutions: Polytechnic University of Turin; University of Milan

Franca D'Agostini (born September 11, 1952) is an Italian philosopher.

== Biography ==
Franca d'Agostini was born in Turin. She earned her BA, MA, and PhD at the University of Turin, where she was a student of Gianni Vattimo. She taught Philosophy of Science at the Polytechnic University of Turin and Logic and Epistemology of the Social Sciences in the Graduate School of Economic and Political and Social Sciences at the University of Milan. She contributes to Italian newspapers such as La Repubblica, La Stampa, il manifesto and Il Fatto Quotidiano. She is especially known for proposing a combination of analytic and continental approaches to philosophy via a systematic confrontation of the two traditions in the second half of the 20th century.

== Metaphilosophy ==
Her first book, Analitici e continentali was published in January 1997 and presents a comparison between two major philosophical traditions of the twentieth century: Anglo-American philosophy (primarily analytical), and European or Continental philosophy (stemming from Germany, France, Spain, and Italy). The book, now translated into several languages, has generated a lively debate and is considered a seminal text on this subject. "The image of philosophy presented here," writes Michael Dummett, "is not, in itself, peculiar to the analytical tradition as opposed to other schools. Rather, it stands in opposition to two modern or postmodern lines of thought: relativism and deconstructionism. A relativist denies the existence of such a thing as truth, in the sense of unconditional truth. [...] A deconstructionist can avoid the question of the existence of absolute truth by maintaining that objectivity is an unrealizable ideal. [..] There can never be a fruitful exchange, much less active cooperation, between these two types of postmodern philosophy and the sort that instead believes philosophy to be a vital field in which to seek the truth, and that this search is not performed in vain. Yet, the barrier of incomprehension should not exist between those adhering to the analytical tradition and those trained in the various traditions that form the vast conglomerate of ‘continental' philosophy." Analitici e continentali, concludes Dummett, helps to break down the barrier of "ignorance of one group’s work with respect to that of the other."

Following this publication, D'Agostini has produced many essays and articles examining the relationship between analytical philosophy and other traditions. This topic is also the main focus of her Breve storia della filosofia nel Novecento, published in 1999. In both Analitici e continentali and Breve storia, Franca D'Agostini performs a critical-reconstructive historiography in order to clarify the fate and meaning of philosophical practice in contemporaneity. At the core of these early writings is the essential metaphilosophical question: what are the nature and rules governing philosophy, its methods and styles, its relations with literature and science, its applications and its public use? Breve storia is not so much a history of philosophy, but a history of metaphilosophy in the twentieth century. Philosophy is pictured as the "paradigmatic anomaly" of contemporary science and culture: it is the paradigm within which sciences, the arts, politics and law operate, but it is an anomaly, because it has no conceivable place within the current institutional framework of scientific knowledge. D'Agostini’s metaphilosophical studies reach their culmination with the 2005 volume Nel chiuso di una stanza con la testa in vacanza. Dieci lezioni sulla filosofia contemporanea (Carocci, 2005), which contains a reasoned and ample illustration of the nature of philosophical practice and the key themes of metaphilosophical reflection. Here D'Agostini presents an image of philosophy as conceptual analysis, addressing in particular the "super-concepts" once called the "transcendentals" (unity, truth, goodness, and all their derivatives and synonyms).

== Nihilism and paradoxes ==
Franca D'Agostini has also addressed other key issues within the current philosophical debate, concerning philosophical logic and metaphysics. In particular she has treated nihilism, the problem of truth, the meaning and the nature of metaphysics, and the use of logic in philosophy and in the public debate. In Disavventure della verità (2002) she reconstructs the history of the self-contradictory statement "the truth does not exist," from the critiques of Plato and Aristotle to the declarations of Nietzsche, to contemporary nihilism and relativism. In The Last fumes. Nihilism and the Nature of Philosophical Concepts (2008), D’Agostini provides an interpretation of nihilism as a failed attempt to get rid of the fundamental philosophical concepts of truth, reality, goodness, justice, etc.

Paradossi (2009) offers a reasoned exploration into the field of the most frequently studied paradoxes, presenting a thorough analysis of approximately eighty paradoxes. As Francesco Berto observes, "D'Agostini proposes a unique general theory of paradoxes, centered on the concept of resistant contradiction; she also offers her own criticisms on some of the philosophies put in place specifically to tackle [these paradoxes]."

In a series of articles between 2001 and 2009 and beyond (appearing in aut aut and the Giornale di metafisica, among others), D'Agostini discusses some current debates in ontology and metaphysics, from a perspective which articulates the findings of the analytical tradition against those of the continental tradition.

== Logic, truth and politics ==
Franca D'Agostini’s research also encompasses the role of truth in the public sphere. Verità avvelenata (2010) is a brief treatise of argumentation focused on the public debate. According to Gianni Vattimo, "the author’s thorough analysis of the many deceptive arguments to which we are exposed is also a rich phenomenology of our public sphere. And the work’s great appeal consists precisely in its vivacious presentation of these myriad examples by arranging them within the framework of argumentation theory.".

Introduzione alla verità (2011) presents contemporary theories of truth and outlines an original perspective, as a particular version of "alethic realism." "Franca D'Agostini wishes to show that 'we cannot get rid of truth.' Unfounded are the positions of those who argue that the concept of truth is 'dogmatic,' 'deleterious for democracy,' a concept we would do well to ‘rid ourselves of.’ D'Agostini consciously goes against the current: the proper use of the concept of truth is precisely what keeps us away from dogmatism and fanaticism and, particularly in politics, it spurs us not to be satisfied with what the politicians tell us and to verify that what they are saying corresponds to the reality of things."

The essential points of this study are: the "inevitable use" of the fundamental philosophical concepts (unum, verum, bonum), the fundamentally skeptical nature of the predicate of truth, the location of the problem of truth within a perspective of "first philosophy" at the intersection of the three areas of ethics, ontology and epistemology, the idea that the methodology of this first philosophy presupposes an ontological gap encompassing nonexistent objects, universals, and unrealized possibilities. D’Agostini’s philosophical perspective is further clarified in the conclusion of her manual of logic "for philosophy and the ordinary use of language" (I mondi comunque possibili), where she illustrates the close connection of logic, philosophy, and democracy, on the basis of a reconsideration of the meaning and history of the three fundamental concepts.

== Works ==
- Analitici e continentali, Milan: Raffaello Cortina, 1997
- Breve storia della filosofia nel Novecento. L'anomalia paradigmatica, Turin: Einaudi, 1999
- Logica del nichilismo, Roma-Bari: Laterza, 2000
- Disavventure della verità, Turin: Einaudi, 2002
- Le ali al pensiero. Corso di logica elementare, Turin: Paravia, 2003
- Nel chiuso di una stanza con la testa in vacanza. Dieci lezioni sulla filosofia contemporanea, Rome: Carocci, 2005
- The Last Fumes. Nihilism and the Nature of Philosophical Concepts, Aurora (Col.): Davies Group Publishers, 2008 ISBN 9781935790167
- Paradossi, Rome: Carocci, 2009
- Verità avvelenata. Buoni e cattivi argomenti nel dibattito pubblico, Turin: Bollati Boringhieri, 2010
- Introduzione alla verità, Turin: Bollati Boringhieri, 2011
- I mondi comunque possibili. Logica per la filosofia e il ragionamento comune, Turin: Bollati Boringhieri, 2012
- Menzogna, Turin: Bollati Boringhieri, 2012
- Logica in pratica. Esercizi per la filosofia e il ragionamento comune, Rome: Carocci, 2013
- Realismo? Una questione non controversa, Turin: Bollati Boringhieri, 2013
- Le ali al pensiero. Introduzione alla logica, Rome: Carocci, 2015 (revised edition of the original published by Paravia in 2003)
- La verità al potere. Sei diritti aletici, Turin: Einaudi, 2019 (co-authored with Maurizio Ferrera)
