= Sant'Agostino, Massa Marittima =

- Church of Saint Augustine
- Chiesa di Sant'Agostino (Italian)
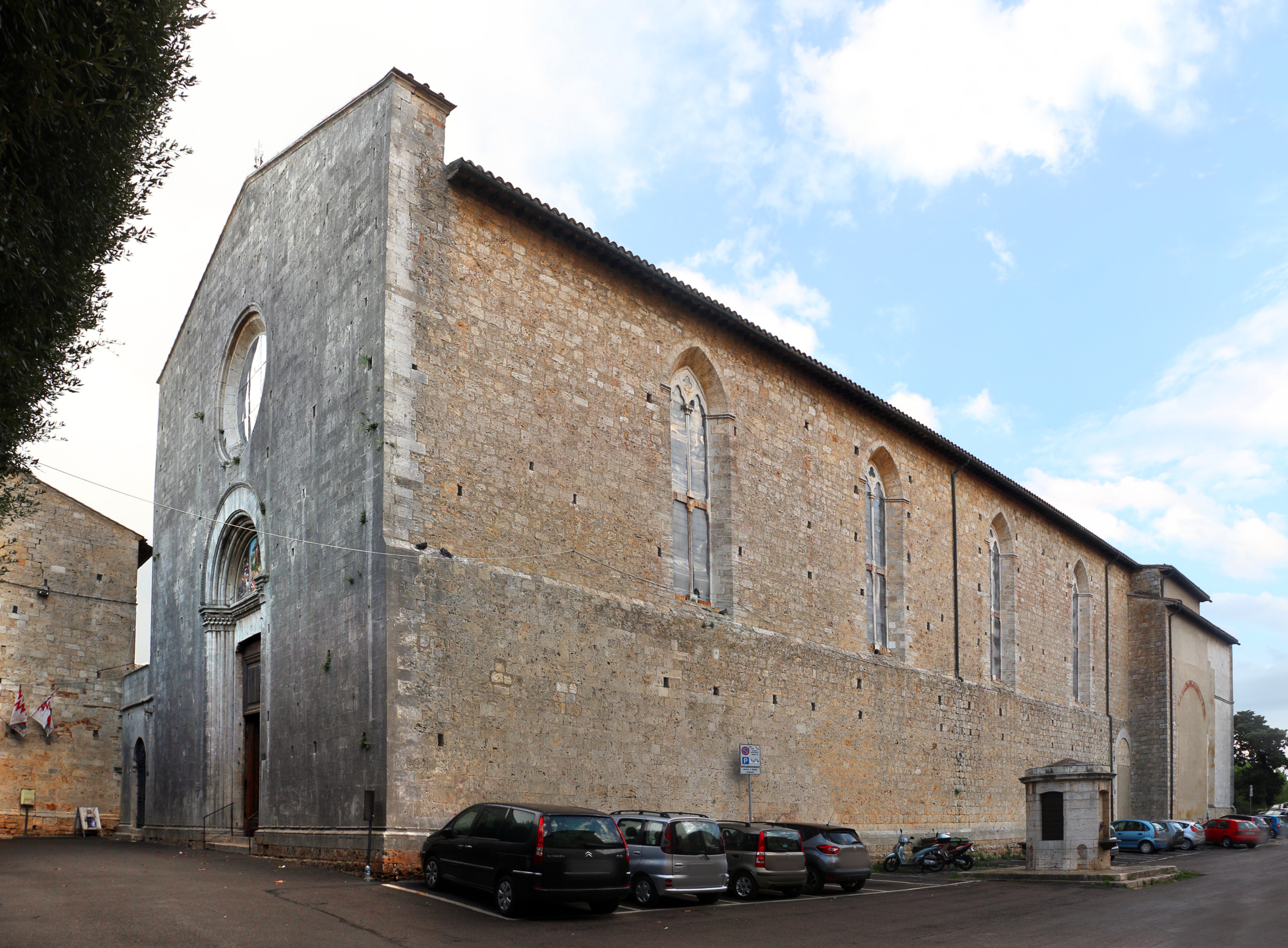
- Sant'Agostino, Massa Marittima
- 43°03′04.31″N 10°53′31.86″E
- Location: Massa Marittima, Grosseto, Tuscany
- Country: Italy
- Denomination: Roman Catholic

History
- Status: Parish church

Architecture
- Architectural type: Church
- Style: Gothic
- Groundbreaking: 1299
- Completed: 1350

Administration
- Diocese: Diocese of Massa Marittima-Piombino

Sant'Agostino is a Roman Catholic church located in Massa Marittima, region of Tuscany, Italy. The church has Gothic and Renaissance architecture elements in the apse (1350) and choir (1520) respectively.

The church with stone facade was begun in 1299 for the Augustinian order, but the apse was completed by 1350 in a gothic style with tall narrow windows. The interior has a Sant'Guglielmo by Antonio Nasini, an Annunciation (1640) by Jacopo da Empoli and a Madonna, Child, and Saints and Annunciation (1639) by Rutilio Manetti. The church once housed for some years a Maestà by Ambrogio Lorenzetti, originally made for the nearby San Pietro all'Orto, and now held in the city gallery.
