= Getulio Agostini =

Venezuelan botanist (1943–1990)

- Born: 1943; Cantaura Venezuela
- Died: 1990 Caracas Venezuela
- Known for: Contributions to taxonomic Myrsinaceae
- Scientific career
- Fields: Myrsinaceae
- Author abbrev. (botany): G.Agostini

Getulio Agostini (1943–1990) was a botanist and professor in Venezuela specializing in Myrsinaceae (now included in the Primulaceae).

== Professional ==
He was secretary of the Venezuelan Association for the Advancement of University Research from 1983 to 1985.
