= De Agostini (disambiguation) =

De Agostini is an Italian publishing house. The name may also refer to:

- De Agostini (surname), Italian surname
- Alberto de Agostini National Park, Chilean natural park

== See also ==
- Agostini (disambiguation)
