= Ludovico Agostini =

Italian poet (1536–1609)

The start of Agostini's Letter to Italy on the plague of 1576

Ludovico Agostini (6 January 1536 – 29 July 1609) was an Italian lawyer and writer of the Counter-Reformation. His most famous work is the utopian Imaginary Republic.

== Life ==
Agostini was born on 6 January 1536 at Pesaro to Giovan Giacomo Agostini and Pantasilea degli Alessandri. His family had been ennobled in the time of his grandfather and namesake. In 1544, while studying law at the University of Padua, Agostini killed another student, Giovan Battista Zannoni, in a duel. Forced to leave Padua, he eventually completed his studies at the University of Bologna, becoming a doctor of both laws in 1557.

In 1560–1562, Agostini attached himself to the court of Duke Guidobaldo II in an attempt to ameliorate his family's worsening economic situation, brought about in part by the duke's confiscations. In 1565, he fell in love with the singer Virginia Vagnoli and proposed marriage. Although she accepted, her father forced her to break it off.

Agostini became for a time an agent for Paolo Mario della Rovere, the bishop of Cagli. He never married, but fathered two illegitimate children in the period 1570–1582, one named Giulio Cesare and the other who died young. In 1582, his father died and he renounced his hereditary seat on the municipal council, preferring to retire to a villa in Soria, where he began studying the Bible.

In April 1584, Agostini set out on a pilgrimage to the Holy Land. He returned to Rome in March 1585 to present a report to Pope Gregory XIII. In 1590, he passed a spiritual retreat at Fonte Avellana. In 1599, he moved to Venice, whence he walked as a pilgrim to Rome for the jubilee of 1600. In 1604, he was appointed governor of Gradara Castle. He died at Gradara on 29 July 1609 after a long illness.

== Works ==
Agostini's major work is L'Infinito (The Infinite), which he wrote in the 1580s. It is a dialogue divided into two books, commentaries on the Book of Genesis and the Book of Exodus, respectively. The second book gradually develops into a description of the ideal society, a utopia. Labelled Repubblica immaginaria (Imaginary Republic), this final section has been treated as a distinct work capable of standing on its own by modern scholars. Although traditionally denigrated as literature, the Imaginary Republic has been recognized "the only utopia which rigorously articulates the ethical and social principles of the Counter-Reformation".

In the 1560s, Agostini wrote a Canzoniere (Song Book) in the style of Petrarch. It includes some 200 love songs, as well as songs on religious and political themes. These include poems on the elections of Popes Pius IV (1560), Pius V (1566) and Gregory XIII (1572), as well as sonnets on the Second French War of Religion (1567) and the battle of Lepanto (1571). The Canzoniere is found in the manuscripts Ital. IX. 301 of the Biblioteca Marciana and 193 bis of the Biblioteca Oliveriana. In the former manuscript is also found his Discorso sulla qualità de amor (Discourse on the Quality of Love), a theoretical treatise on spiritual love, which he wrote for Virginia Vagnoli, who was also the addressee of many of the love songs.

Agostini wrote Le giornate soriane (The Sorian Days) in 1572–1574. It is a work of escapist utopianism depicting a band of seven young courtiers take a summer vacation in the bucolic setting of Soria. It is found in two copies, now manuscripts 191 and 1464 of the Biblioteca Oliveriana. During his years in Soria, he wrote Esclamazioni a Dio (Exclamations to God).

Several of Agostini's letters survive. In 1573, he wrote to the Duchess Vittoria Farnese about the necessity of living within one's means. When Urbino rebelled in 1572, Agostini wrote to Duke Guidobaldo urging him to crush the rebels. In 1575, he wrote two letters to Duke Francesco Maria II about social reforms, including banning usury, gambling and venality. In 1576, he wrote a Lettera all'Italia (Letter to Italy) describing the outbreak of plague as divine chastisement. In 1585, he sent his report on the Holy Land, Viaggio in Terra Santa (Voyage in the Holy Land), to Francesco Maria in a letter. In 1590, he wrote to Pope Sixtus V expressing his ideas about legal reforms. In 1592, he wrote a similar letter to Pope Clement VIII. That same year, he wrote to Francesco Maria lamenting the state of the army of the Duchy of Urbino.

Agostini's works are mostly unpublished. In 1591, he planned to publish the Esclamazioni a Dio, Lettera all'Italia, Viaggio in Terra Santa and some other letters in a single volume entitled Gli ozii (Leisure), but the project was abandoned.

== Bibliography ==
- Firpo, Luigi (1954). "Ludovico Agostini, riformatore sociale e consigliere politico" (PDF). Studia Oliveriana. II: 15–32. Archived from the original (PDF) on 28 July 2018.
- Asor Rosa, Alberto (1960). "Agostini, Ludovico". Dizionario Biografico degli Italiani (in Italian). Vol. 1: Aaron–Albertucci. Rome: Istituto dell'Enciclopedia Italiana. OCLC 883370.
- Manuel, Frank E.; Manuel, Fritzie P. (2009). Utopian Thought in the Western World. Cambridge, Massachusetts: Harvard University Press. pp. 152, 167, 171, 172, 173, 174–175, 178, 179, 274, 825, 827. ISBN 9780674040564.
- Donato, Antonio (2023). Ludovico Agostini's 'Imaginary Republic': Utopia in the Italian Renaissance. London: Palgrave Macmillan. ISBN 978-3-030-97015-4.
