= Alethic =

The adjective alethic refers to the various modalities of truth, such as necessity, possibility or impossibility, as in:

- Alethic modality, a modality in linguistics
- Subjunctive or alethic possibility, a form of modality studied in modal logic
