= Silvana Agostoni =

Mexican-Italian artist

- Born: Silvana Agostoni
- Known for: Photography

Silvana Agostoni is a multicultural visual artist whose work is known for her photographs exploring issues of the body, identity and landscape. Her work has been exhibited throughout the United States and internationally.

== Early life ==
Agostoni was born into a creative family. Her father, Giorgio (Jorge) Agostoni, an architect from Italy, played a major role in the planning and design of key museums in Mexico and other parts of the world since the 1960s, including the Museo Nacional de Antropología in Mexico City and the Olympic Museum in Switzerland. Her mother, Lucille Urencio, a Mexican actress, worked extensively with theater director Juan José Gurrola and was a drama professor at Universidad Iberoamericana.

== Education ==
Agostoni was driven to study photography as soon as she finished high school. She spent two years taking photography classes at Escuela Activa de Fotografía to get her certification as a professional photographer. Afterwards, she obtained her Bachelor of Fine Arts in Graphic Design at Universidad Autónoma Metropolitana in Mexico City. Following the completion of her bachelor's degree, she moved to New York City to get her Master of Fine Arts in Photography, Video and New Media at The School of Visual Arts New York City (SVA NYC).

== Career ==
Agostoni's art focuses on landscapes, represented in both the body and the world and how they transform and behave over time.

The large-scale photographic series, On Veils, takes a look at natural elements such as mist, fog, and steam to create bodies of art that represent dramatic and transformational sceneries. Many of the images in the series examine environmental forces as a way to simplify physical space and make it serene.

Traces is a project depicting ephemera taken at a former penitentiary in Mexico. The images are re-interpretations of icons and remnants left behind, creating an illusion of presence.

Topografias is a series of photographs that depict close up images of the human body, in which the contours of body's skin translate the self into a map. The prints capture small snippets of skin, nails, and hair. Agostoni critiques visual determinism by showing diverse intersectional bodies defined by nationality, gender, and so on.

=== Sistema Nacional de Creadores de Arte Fellowship ===
In 2019, Agostoni received the prestigious fellowship Sistema Nacional de Creadores de Arte, a three-year program sponsored by the National Fund for Arts and Culture in Mexico. Issues addressed in the works of her fellowship include the themes presented in White among others that portray the natural world. In her photographic practice, she also considers the differences between her photographs of physical landscapes and 19th century landscape photography. In 2021, she collaborated with Springboard for the Arts to discuss what art she makes while in isolation during the U.S. quarantine period.

== Selected exhibitions ==
Year	Exhibition Name	Gallery / Museum	Location
2019-2020	Identidades	Museo Archivo de Fotografía	Mexico City, Mexico
2019	Thirty Three Views	Second Shift Studio Space	Saint Paul, Minnesota
2011	Manchas en el Muro (solo)	Centro Fotográfico Alvarez Bravo	Oaxaca, Mexico
2011	Huellas (solo)	Museo Archivo de la Fotografía	Mexico City, Mexico
2009	Only Water	Dina Mitrani Gallery	Miami, Florida
2007	Face: Scavenging Identity, Eight artists explore the margins of portrait genre	Baahng Gallery	New York, New York
2002	ARCO International Contemporary Art Fair	Galería Enrique Guerrero	Madrid, Spain
2000	Latin American Artist-Photographers from the Lehigh University Art Gallery Collection	Museo del Barrio	New York, New York
2000	Topografías	Centro de la Imagen	Mexico City, Mexico
1998	New Visions Five Contemporary Mexican Photographers	Houston Center for Photography	Houston, Texas
1997	Physiognomy (solo)	White Columns Gallery	New York, New York
