= Agostino Campanella =

Italian painter

Agostino Campanella (active 1770) was an Italian painter and engraver. He was born in Florence. He engraved several prints representing historical and biblical subjects.
