= Angela Agostini =

Italian botanist and mycologist (1880–?)

- Scientific career
- Workplaces: University of Pavia

Angela Agostini (1880-?) was an Italian botanist and mycologist who conducted research at the Botanical Institute of the University of Pavia. The standard author abbreviation A.Agostini is used to indicate this person as the author when citing a botanical name.
