= Agostino Bernal =

Agostino Bernal (1587 – 13 September 1642) was a Spanish Jesuit theologian.

== Life ==
Bernal was born in 1587 in Magallón. He entered the Society of Jesus in 1603 when sixteen years old. A classical scholar, he taught humanities and rhetoric with success. The greater part of his life, however, he spent as professor of philosophy and theology at Zaragoza. He died in Zaragoza on 13 September 1642.

== Works ==
His published works are:

- Disputationes de Divini Verbi Incarnatione (Zaragoza, 1639);
- Disputationes de Sacramentis in genere, Eucharistia et Ordine (Lyon, 1651), a posthumous work.
