= Santagostino (surname) =

Santagostino is an Italian surname, which means St. Augustine. Notable people with the surname include:

- Duilio Santagostino (1914–1982), Italian footballer
- Giuseppe Santagostino (1901–1955), Italian footballer and manager
