= Apollonio Buonfratelli =

Italian painter

Apollonio Buonfratelli (16th century) was an Italian miniature painter of the Renaissance, active in Florence.
