= Adelcira Agostini de Muñoz =

Argentine physician (1863–1969)

- Born: 1863; Austria
- Died: 1969 (aged 105–106); Argentina
- Education: University of Buenos Aires
- Occupation: Physician

Adelcira Agostini de Muñoz (1863–1969) Austrian-born Argentine physician, belonging to the first generation of Argentine female doctors.

== Biography ==
She entered the Faculty of Medicine at the University of Buenos Aires in 1902 and graduated in 1910, as the only woman in her class. Her thesis was titled, "Contribution to the study of pseudometritis." Her classmates included Enrique Finochietto, Santiago Chichizola and Juan J. Spangenberg. She provided services at the Durand Hospital (Buenos Aires), where the Childcare Institute No. 2 operated. She also acted as assistant to the Toxicology Chair of Professor Alfredo Buzzo, founder and first president of the Childcare Society, and in several health establishments, medical establishments and social entities.

== Women in the medical profession ==
A minority of doctors belonged to the Childcare Society. In 1935, at the time of its foundation. Of the list of 66 founding partners, only ten were women, one of them was Agostini de Muñoz. In this first generation of female doctors, their opportunity to practice within established institutions was very limited. Added to this was that their participation took place in the lowest positions. In Argentina, the incorporation of women into the medical profession occurred with difficulties, although they gradually managed to become part of the professional field. In addition to Cecilia Grierson, a first generation of doctors joined the profession: among others, Petrona Eyle, (1866–1945), Julieta Lanteri (1873–1932), Elvira Rawson de Dellepiane (1867–1954), Alicia Moreau de Justo (1885–1986), María Teresa Ferrari de Gaudino (1887–1956). They represented not only the access of women to the university environment, a result of changes in the educational system but also the slow recognition of women in the scientific field.

Agostini de Muñoz co-authored information and advice for male physicians seeking to communicate effectively with "unapproachable mothers."

"Thus, the medical community challenged an ancestral female tradition of child care; because women recurrently shared knowledge, ideas and knowledge about the different moments of reproduction, breastfeeding and parenting. The visitor became "the mother's advisor", in his "confidant ", who allowed him to encompass "different topics: health, work, salaries, needs and even small trifles." The mothers were in turn conquered " by the culture manifested by the feeling and speaking, full of the Visitor's impeccable pleasant simplicity." However, it was not strange that In his actions he would encounter "unapproachable mothers who showed him a sordid hostility"; and to conquer them, it was necessary to have "good judgment, demonstrating a peaceful indifference and without discouragement, insisting with gentleness and iron will on his good purpose." (Agostini de Muñoz and Tucci, 1936:179).

Agostini de Muñoz died in 1969, presumably in Argentina.

== Selected publications ==
She wrote several articles in the magazine of the Childcare Society; In the first year, she published the article "Organization of Boarding Schools of Childcare Institutes" (Agostini de Muñoz, 1935).

Agostini de Muñoz, Aldecira and Tucci, Fausto C. (1936), "Role of the hygiene visitor in the anti-tuberculosis fight of the early childhood protection section", in: Annals of the Childcare Society of Buenos Aires, Volume II, N° 2, pp. 177-184.

Buzzo, A., A. Agostini de Muñoz, and A. Calabrese. "Contribución al estudio de las causas de la aversión del lactante al seno materno." An Soc Pueric B Aires 3 (1939): 183-6.
