= Francesco D'Agostino =

Italian jurist (1946–2022)

- Born: 9 February 1946; Rome, Italy
- Died: 3 May 2022 (aged 76); Rome, Italy
- Education: Tor Vergata University
- Occupation: Jurist

Francesco D'Agostino (9 February 1946 – 3 May 2022) was an Italian jurist, who specialised in philosophy of law and bioethics.

== Biography ==
D'Agostino graduated from the University of Rome in 1968 with a degree in jurisprudence. He continued his legal and philosophical studies at the University of Bonn and University of Fribourg, before obtaining a doctorate in jurisprudence at the University of Catania. He would hold professorial positions at the University of Catania until 1990.

He began as professor in 1974 at several Italian universities, namely the University of Salento, and University of Urbino, and was a visiting professor in France, Spain and the United States, notably in the New York University School of Law.

D'Agostino presided over the Union of Italian Catholic Jurists and was the emeritus president of the National Committee of Bioethics of Italy. He was a member of the Pontifical Academy for Life and a consultant for the Pontifical Council for the Family. Since 1988, he had been the head director for the International Magazine of Philosophy of Law and New Politics Studies (Rivista internazionale di filosofia del diritto) in Rome.

Additionally, he authored more than three hundred publications, including many monographs. D'Agostino was a frequent contributor to prominent bioethics publications, newspapers like Avvenire and L'Osservatore Romano.

== Personal and legal stances ==
D'Agostino commented on euthanasia, ostensibly opposing its usage for terminally ill patients.

He stated that "the right response to all tragic situations of chronic invalidating diseases and illnesses that inevitably lead to death does not consist in the interruption of treatment (of which euthanasia is an extreme form), but in the therapist's warm and compassionate closeness to the patient".

Furthermore, he opposed divorce, and particularly, homosexuality. He argued that homosexuality is "a problem".

In 1999, D'Asgostino stated that "homosexual communication cannot have juridical recognition because it is not communication; or better and more precisely, it is not communication in the sense, the only sense, that can have relevance for the law". He characterised any argument for homosexual relationships in equality with those of heterosexual relationships as "objectively groundless", and that this is "all the jurist needs to regard the communicative nature of a homosexual relationship as juridically irrelevant and therefore as incapable of formalization".

== Publications ==
- La dignità degli ultimi giorni, 1998.
- Elemento para una filosofía de la familia. Ediciones Rialp. 2002. ISBN 978-84-321-2811-0.
- Filosofía de la familia. Ediciones Rialp. 2007. ISBN 978-84-321-3620-7.
- Bioética, estudios de filosofía del derecho. Ediciones Internacionales Universitarias. 2003. ISBN 978-84-8469-075-7.
- La bioéthique dans la perspective de la philosophie du droit, 2005
- Introduzione alla biopolitica. Dodici voci fondamentali, 2009.

== Awards ==
- III Premio Internazionale "Mons. Pompeo Sarnelli" (2006).
- Western Prize for Bioethics, Jesi (2009).
- Saint Benedict Prize of the Sublacense Foundation.
