= D'Agostino Supermarkets =

Family-founded supermarket chain in the United States

- Formerly: Yorkville Food Shoppe; D'Agostino Brothers
- Company type: Private
- Industry: Grocery retail
- Founded: 1932
- Founders: Pasquale "Patsy" D'Agostino; Nicola "Nick" D'Agostino
- Headquarters: Larchmont, New York, United States
- Number of locations: 26 stores (peak); 10 stores (2019)
- Area served: New York City; Westchester County
- Key people: Nicholas D'Agostino Jr., Chairman; Nicholas D'Agostino III, CEO; G. Robert James, President
- Revenue: US$200,000,000+ (peak)
- Website: www.dagnyc.com

Alternate logo

D'Agostino Supermarkets is a supermarket chain in New York City that was bought by Gristedes in 2018, selling a controlling interest to John Catsimatidis. The store was founded in 1932 by brothers Pasquale and Nicola D'Agostino. At D'Agostino's peak in the 1990s, the chain operated at 26 locations in New York City and adjacent Westchester County, with annual sales exceeding $200 million. Later, D'Agostino's consolidated to nine stores (now ten), in Manhattan.

== Founding and expansion ==
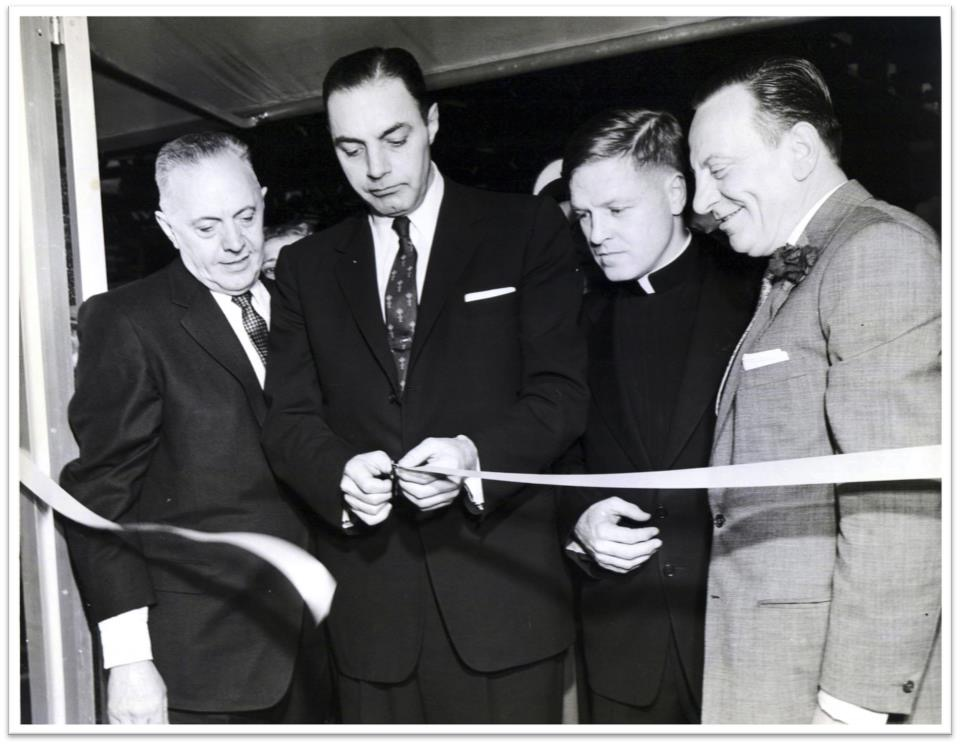
The opening of D'Agostino Brothers on 20th Street (1950). Every store opened by the family was first blessed by a Catholic priest. Left to right: Patsy D'Agostino, city official, priest, Nick D'Agostino Sr.

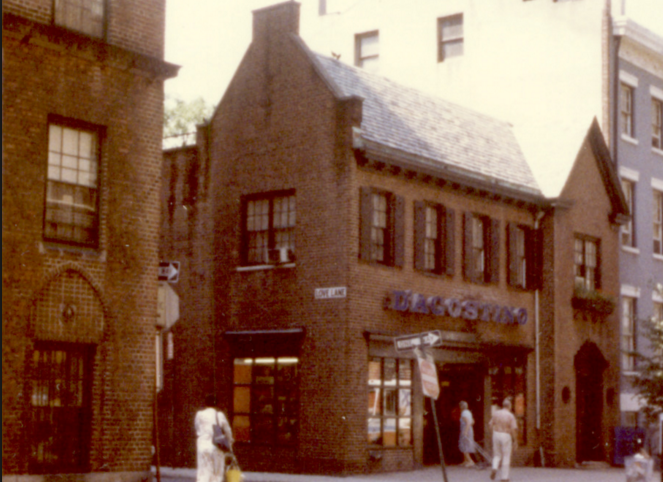
D'Agostino's in a landmarked building at Love Lane and Henry Street, Brooklyn (1980). Today CVS.

The founders of D'Agostino Supermarkets, brothers Pasquale and Nicholas D'Agostino Sr., emigrated from the mountain village of Bugnara, Italy, arriving separately in New York City as teenagers in the 1920s. Due to their poverty, they skipped high school and instead furthered their education by assisting merchants including their father's fruit-and-vegetable pushcart business.

In 1932, the brothers bought a small shop on Manhattan's Upper East Side, a prosperous neighborhood whose residents could afford quality groceries even during the Great Depression. In 1939, the store moved to larger quarters nearby; the brothers named it the Yorkville Food Shoppe and added a meat department. In a key innovation, they gave people the opportunity to shop for meat, produce, dairy and baked goods in a single store, helping to pioneer and popularize the idea of the "supermarket". D'Agostino's flourished in the post-WWII economic boom and opened another large store in 1950, on 20th Street alongside Stuyvesant Town – Peter Cooper Village.

Pasquale died in 1960 and Nicholas ultimately bought out his share of the business, to serve as CEO, chairman and President, and to resolve the family succession issue. At this time, there were eight D'Agostino stores on Manhattan's East Side. With its reputation for quality meats, D'Agostino's ran popular ads in the 1960s that teased, "Please don't kiss the butcher.” Nicholas D'Agostino relinquished daily management to his sons, Stephen and Nicholas Jr., in 1964. With Nicholas Sr. continuing as chairman, Stephen became president and CEO in 1972, and Nicholas Jr. succeeded him in 1982.

During the 1970s, D'Agostino's expanded to Manhattan's West Side, and promoted the chain with sturdy plastic "D'Ag Bags" that were fashionable enough to bring further cachet. The store's singing commercials, created by Jo Foxworth, with the tag line, "Please, Mr. D'Agostino, Move Closer to Me," aired routinely on radio and television during this period. At its peak in the 1990s, after two generations of steady expansion, the chain operated at 26 locations in New York City and adjacent Westchester County, with annual sales exceeding $200 million.

== Difficulties and downsizing ==
During the 2000s, D'Agostino's and similar stores experienced worsening competitive pressure from larger chains of supermarkets and drugstores. At the same time, worsening financial pressure from New York real estate costs, unionized labor expenses, and trade credit restrictions severely limited the cash available for refilling shelves. By 2016, under CEO Nicholas D'Agostino III, the chain consolidated back to nine stores, all in Manhattan, and was considering combining with Key Food, Gristedes, or another rival grocer. A $10 million line of credit from the owner of Gristedes helped stabilize operations.

Since the acquisition of a controlling interest of D'Agostino's by Gristedes(see above), D'Agostino's food and product selection and price points have largely changed to mirror Gristede's offerings. The meat counter, which often featured on-site butchers able to cut meat to customers' orders have almost entirely been removed and replaced by a "meat clerk." This, too models most Gristedes supermarkets, where meat and fish are pre-packaged and shipped to the individual stores. D'Agostino's once respected for its broad offerings high-quality in cheese has also been transformed largely to mirror the Gristedes chain.

== Popular culture ==
D'Agostino's has long used the slogan "New York's Grocer" and has often appeared in entertainment media to convey the New York setting. The chain figured prominently in the 1974 film Death Wish, including a series of scenes within the store itself. The store also features in the 1975 movie, The Prisoner of Second Avenue. On television, D'Agostino's is where Will & Grace ran into each other a year after their falling out, and the store was often featured in the series Friends. In the 1991 novel American Psycho, serial killer Patrick Bateman shops at D'Agostino's. In Ghostbusters II, Dana Barrett is seen holding a bag of groceries from D'Agostino's. D'Agostino's is mentioned in the Drivin' N' Cryin' song "Honeysuckle Blue", as well as the Das EFX song "Jussumen".
