= D'Agostino =

Noble Family in Italy

D'Agostino (of Sicilia) Coat of Arms
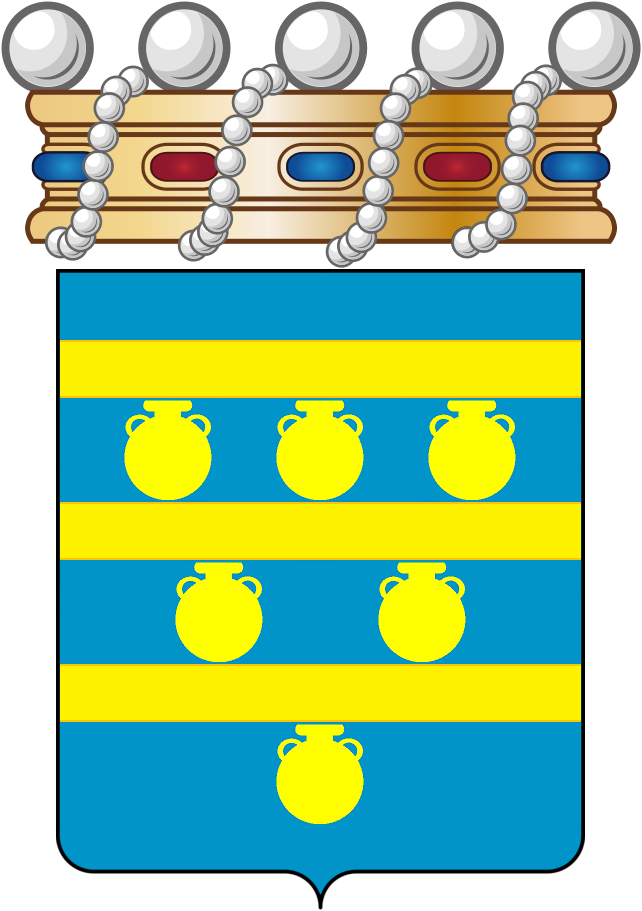
- Motto: "Sic Itur ad Astra"
- Badge: Azure weapon, three bands of gold, accompanied by six jars of the same, situated 3, 2, 1

The D'Agostino family is a Sicilian noble lineage originated at least in the thirteenth century, Sicilian strain of historical noble family Agostini Fantini Venerosi Della Seta Gaetani Bocca Grassi from Pisa, family of noble origin, Earls of the Kingdom of Italy, Earls Palatino of the Grand Duchy of Tuscany, noble patricians of the Maritime Republic of Pisa. This family dressed different political-military roles in Sicily. The Gaetani (Caetani) family, which the D'Agostino family is connected to, historically claimed descent from the ancient Roman gens Anicia, a prestigious patrician family known for being among the first Roman aristocratic families to embrace Christianity. The Anicii maintained significant influence in both ecclesiastical and imperial affairs. As a result, the D'Agostino family’s association with the Gaetani line suggests a potential ancestral connection to the late imperial Roman aristocracy.

This noble and distinguished family there are many virtues of its members, the costs charged, the titles and fiefs. Among its exponents includes a Bourbon army colonel, two army captains of the two Sicilies, a former captain of the Hunters, a higher line of Prince, a legitimist officer, an artillery lieutenant, a 1st Lieutenant, and members of different orders of chivalry, such as Rinaldo, in 1283 member of the order of the knights of Girgenti (Agrigento).

Not least the nobility of the sword was the nobles of the robe, Peter D'Agostino Rational Master of the Kingdom of Sicily, in the second half of the fifteenth century. Besides he find other family members to fill such as: Andreotto D'Agostino, in 1515, another Pietro D'Agostino in the second half of the sixteenth century. These Distinguished members of the D'Agostino entered the Court of the Real Estate, collegial office, having control functions, recording and jurisdiction on financial and monetary matters, composed of six rational masters appointed by the King. These were the supervision of all financial affairs and accounts of all the other pecuniary officers, they participated in the meetings of the Holy Royal Council with binding opinion on their subject, and often corresponded directly with the sovereign without going through the viceroy. Other members of the Holy Royal council, was Antonio D'Agostino as vice-chancellor of the Holy Royal Council. Other positions held were: that of Governor Peter covered in Mazara, to Secreto by Philip Matthew, that of Ambassador William in Nicosia and in the Court of the Aragonese King Peter of Aragon, that of Governor of Pietro Bianchi Company in Palermo for several years, that of Magistrate John, that of Judge Pretoriano covered with James in Girgenti, that of Mazara del Castellano Crown Castle from Andreotto, that of Magistrate John, to Proconservatore Antonio, to Juror covered with Giovan Vincenzo, Matteo, Giovanni, and so on.

According to genealogists past the D'Agostino family "enjoyed nobility in Palermo, Girgenti, Messina, Nicosia and other cities of Sicily, enjoying anywhere nobility", "a branch passed in Mazara, where branched off in Sciacca." Mugnos in accordance with Inveges identifies the lineage derived from a Francesco D'Agostino lived in the thirteenth century in Palermo. He belongs to an illustrious noble family of Pisa Agostini, who moved with Francesco in the thirteenth century in Sicily.

== Agostini in Venice ==
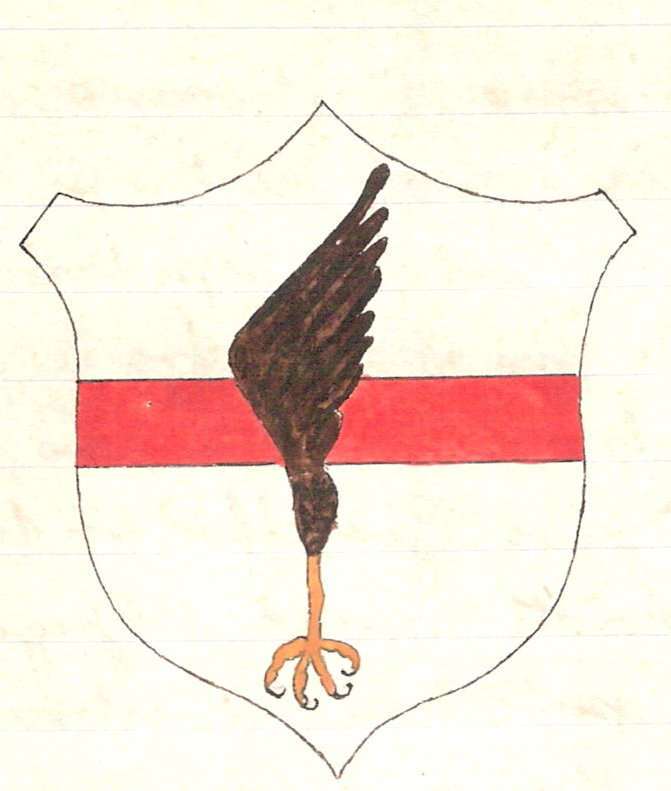
Coat of arms of the Venetian Agostini

Vincenzo Maria Coronelli, in his extensive catalogue of the noble families of Venice, records the inscriptions and memorials preserved in the Church of San Pietro di Murano, which commemorate the two now-extinct branches of this distinguished Venetian lineage, named Agostini, a family of the same gens to D'Agostino, offering a lasting testament to their former prominence and heritage within the Republic’s patrician society. According to family tradition, the Agostini family—merchants and bankers with branches in Pisa, Palermo, Ancona, Venice, and Antwerp, and members of the Bergoline Lanfranchi consortium—were enlisted by the Venetian Republic to aid Pisa, owing to their reputed expertise in the use of the then “new” firearms.

== Representatives and distinguished characters ==
- Filippo Matteo D'Agostino, was secreted of Petralia and purchased by Artale Cardona Count of Collesano, the fief of Flureni or Xureni and its possessions near Polizzi Generosa (act of the notary Nicola Rosso of 7 December 1470).
- Giovan Vincenzo D'Agostino was in Palermo in the years 1560-1561 the famous oath.
- Giacomo D'Agostino was in Girgenti (now Agrigento) in the years 1582-1583 and 1600-1601 Judge pretoriano.
- Pietro D'Agostino was Rational Master of the Kingdom of Sicily and the governor of the city of Mazara in 1486.
- Andreotto D'Agostino was Rational Master of the Kingdom of Sicily and hereditary Castellano of Mazara Castle in 1520.
- Pietro D'Agostino in 1580 was captain of the weapons in the city of Trapani and vicar general of the Kingdom.
- The Notary Guglielmo D'Agostino, in 1282, he was sent as ambassador in the city of Nicosia, at the court of the Aragonese king Peter of Aragon.
- together With his brother Giovanni D'Agostino are inscribed and numbered, in 1283, among the knights of Nicosia.
- Antonio D'Agostino was a doctor of law Vice-Chancellor of the Holy Royal Council.
- Andreotto D'Agostino in the years 1513-1514 and 1520-1521 he was magistrate of Palermo, the same charge in 1550 for his son:
- Pietro D'Agostino, Baron of the feuds of Polizzi, and Giovizzano Flureni, was governor of the Compagnia dei Bianchi of Palermo between 1541 and 1543, also increasingly in Palermo in the years 1541-1543 and 1557–1558, he was also master of the rational Royal Heritage and governor of the noble. "Compagnia dei Bianchi"
- Giacomo D'Agostino was in Palermo in 1506-1508 judge pretoriano.
- Giovanni D'Agostino was magistrate of Palermo in 1513.
- Rinaldo D'Agostino was in Girgenti (now Agrigento), in 1283, counted among the knights of the city.
- Francesco D'Agostino was in Mazzara, captain in 1549.
- Gentile D'Agostino bottom of a chaplaincy and an ecclesiastical benefice in the first half of 1600.
- Giovanni D'Agostino was Judge of the High Court of the Vicariate (appointed 21 November 1746), was later Royal Governor in Matera and Gaeta.
- Antonio D'Agostino was in Sciacca in 1722 proconservatore.
- Carlo D'Agostino, son of Francesco D'Agostino (1794-1868), born in 1833, was superintendent of the Minister of Naples. He died in 1892.
- Ernesto D'Agostino, son of Charles D'Agostino (1833-1892), born in 1858, was President of the State Council, during the Kingdom of Italy. He died in 1950.

In the city of Polizzi Generosa they lived and obtained senior positions:

- Matteo D'Agostino was sworn in 1486 and acatapano in 1490, 1491.
- Giovanni D'Agostino was sworn in the years 1488, 1489, 1494, 1495 and 1500.
- Antonio D'Agostino was a judge in 1467, swore in the years 1492 to 1494, 1501, 1502 and notary public in the years 1472, 1473, 1488-1490 and 1495.
- Francesco D'Agostino was sworn in 1511.
- Giovan Pietro D'Agostino was sworn in 1566.
- Giovanni Battista D'Agostino was a judge in 1560, sworn in 1561 and acatapano in the years 1562, 1563, 1569.
- Roberto D'Agostino, born in Rome, 1946, possibly the most famous Italian journalist in Italy.
- Giuseppe D'Agostino, born in Genzano di Roma 1969, obstetrician
