= Agostino Apollonio =

Italian painter

Agostino Apollonio was an Italian painter of the Renaissance. He was born in Sant'Angelo in Vado, and painted around mid-1530s. He assisted his uncle Luzio Dolci. He lived in Castel Durante.
