= Nicholas D'Agostino Sr. =

Italian-American businessman (1910–1996)

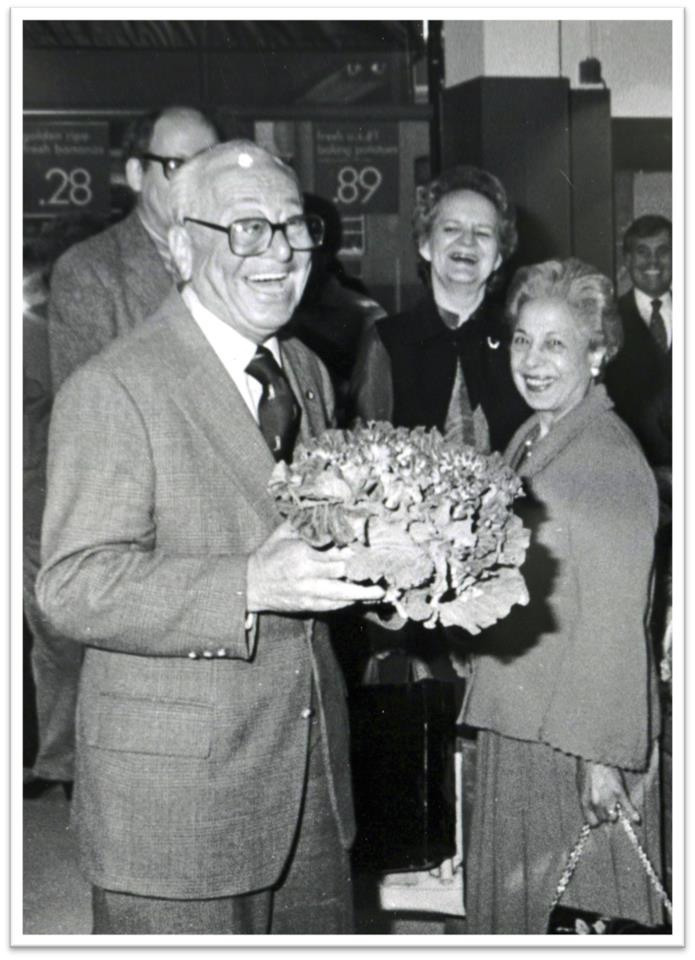
- Born: Nicola D'Agostino; June 8, 1910; Bugnara, Italy
- Died: June 23, 1996 (aged 86); Manhasset, New York
- Other name: Nick
- Occupation: Grocery retail
- Years active: 1932–1984
- Known for: D'Agostino Supermarkets

Nicholas D'Agostino Sr. (June 8, 1910 – June 23, 1996) was a supermarket magnate in New York City. He was an Italian-American immigrant and the co-founder of D'Agostino Supermarkets, one of New York's historically original and leading grocery chains.

D'Agostino was born in Bugnara, Italy, a village in the Abruzzo region of Southern Italy to Ignazio and Loretta D'Agostino. The family migrated to New York City in 1924. After helping their father work a fruit and vegetable pushcart, D'Agostino was trained as a butcher, a skill he would use to help grow the grocery chain.

In 1932, D'Agostino and his brother Pasquale D'Agostino entered the grocery business by launching a small dry goods and grocery shop. Eventually the stores would expand into some of the first supermarkets in New York. D'Agostino is credited as being responsible for many of the innovative and effective marketing campaigns that contributed to the chain's success. By the time of his death, the store had expanded into 26 locations in New York and Westchester and had an annual revenue of $200 million.

D'Agostino was active in charitable and community work; he helped found Boy's Towns and Girl's Towns of Italy, a children's charity in Italy. He served on the board of directors of Catholic Charities of the Archdiocese of New York and was recognized with the B'nai B'rith Anti-Defamation Award for advancing fair treatment of individuals of all backgrounds, religions, and nationalities.

D'Agostino married Josephine Tucciarone in 1932; they had three children, Nicholas, Stephen, and Loretta Schmitz and 17 grandchildren, and 40 great-grandchildren. D'Agostino died in 1996 at the age of 86 in Long Island, New York.
