= Agostino Maccari =

Italian astrologer

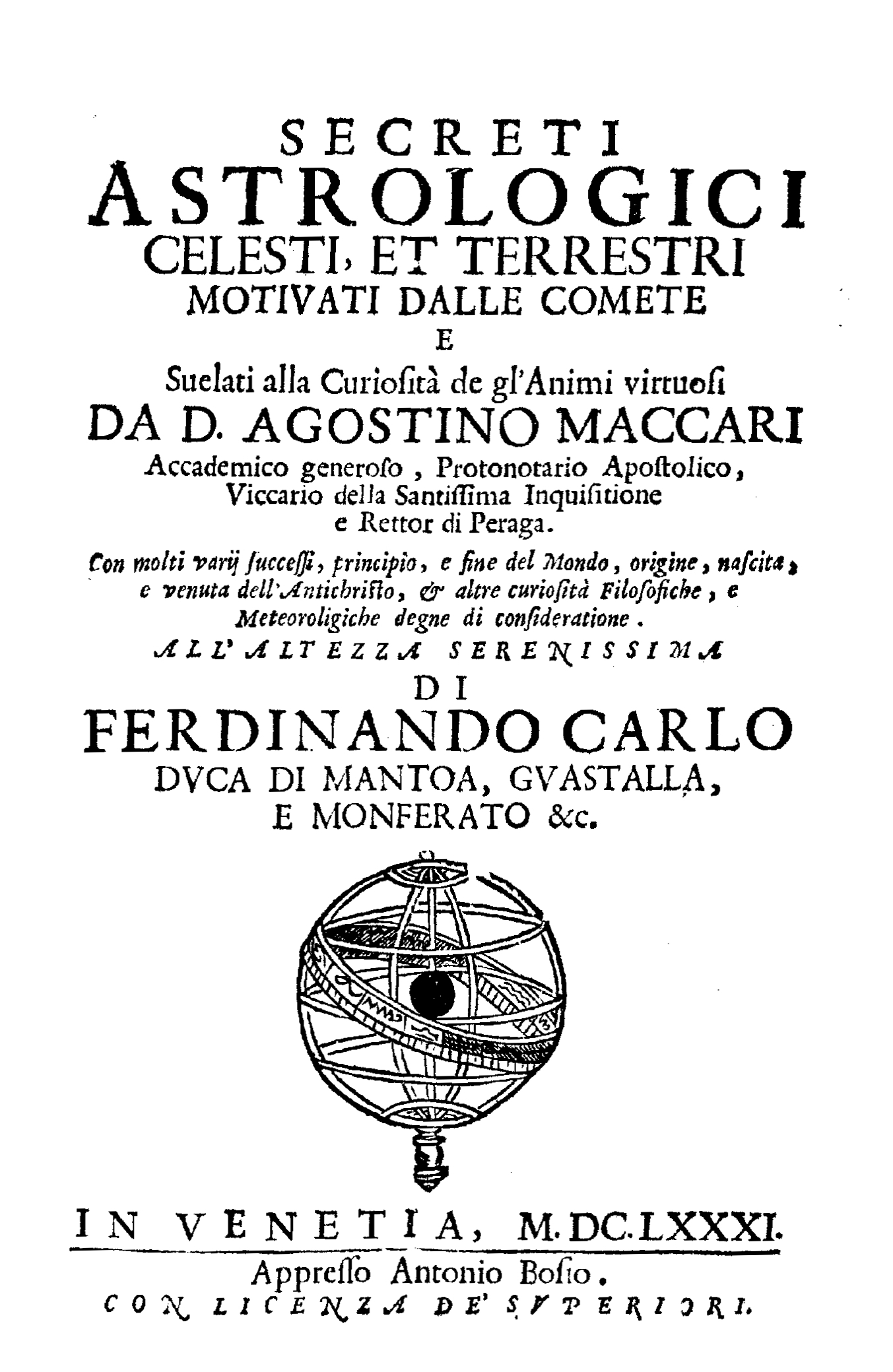
Secreti astrologici celesti, et terrestri motivati dalle comete, 1681

Agostino Maccari was a 17th-century Italian astrologer, theologian, protonotary apostolic and vicar of the Holy Inquisition.

== Works ==
- Secreti astrologici celesti, et terrestri motivati dalle comete e svelati alla curiosità de gl'animi virtuosi (in Italian). Venice: Antonio Bosio. 1681.
