= Torbay (disambiguation) =

Torbay is a local government district in Devon, England.

Torbay or Tor Bay can also mean:

Places

- Torbay, Western Australia
- Torbay, Newfoundland and Labrador, Canada
- Torbay, New Zealand
- Tor Bay, Nova Scotia, Canada

People

- George Torbay, Australian television personality
- Joe Torbay (1941-2009), Canadian puppeteer
- Richard Torbay (born 1961), Australian politician

Other

- Tor Bay, a bay in Devon, England
- Tor Bay (Western Australia), a bay
- Tor Bay, a bay in Wales, next to Three Cliffs Bay
- Torbay (crater), a crater on Mars
- Torbay (constituency), Devon, England
- Torbay and South Devon, a unitary authority due to be formed in 2028
- HMS Torbay, the name of several ships of the British Royal Navy
