= Demonstrations in Physics =

- Also known as: Science Demonstrations
- Presented by: Julius Sumner Miller
- Country of origin: Australia
- Original language: English

Original release
- Network: ABC Television
- Release: 1969

Demonstrations in Physics is an educational science series produced in Australia by ABC Television in 1969. The series was hosted by American scientist Julius Sumner Miller, who demonstrated experiments involving various disciplines in the world of physics. The series was also released in the United States under the title Science Demonstrations.

This program was a series of 45 shows (approximately 15 minutes each) on various topics in physics, organized into 3 units: Mechanics; Heat and Temperature / Toys; and Waves and Sound / Electricity and Magnetism.

== Episodes ==
Following is a listing of episode titles, as given by the index on one set of the videos (the titles as introduced by Professor Miller during the episode are often different).

=== Unit 1 - Mechanics ===
- Episode 1. The Idea of the Center of Gravity
- Episode 2. Newton's First Law of Motion
- Episode 3. Newton's Second Law of Motion
- Episode 4. Newton's Third Law of Motion
- Episode 5. Energy and Momentum
- Episode 6. Concerning Falling Bodies and Projectiles
- Episode 7. The Simple Pendulum, Oscillating Things
- Episode 8. Adventures with Bernoulli
- Episode 9. Soap Bubbles and Soap Films
- Episode 10. Atmospheric Pressure - Properties of Gases
- Episode 11. Centrifugal Force and Other Strange Matters
- Episode 12. The Strange Behavior of Rolling Things
- Episode 13. Archimedes' Principle
- Episode 14. Pascal's Principle - The Properties of Liquids
- Episode 15. Levers, Inclined Planes, Geared Wheels and Other Machines

=== Unit 2, Part I - Heat and Temperature ===
- Episode 16. The Ideas of Heat and Temperature
- Episode 17. Thermometric Properties and Processes
- Episode 18. How to Produce Heat Energy
- Episode 19. Thermal Expansion of Stuff - Solids
- Episode 20. Thermal Expansion of Stuff - Gases, Liquids
- Episode 21. The Strange Thermal Behavior of Ice, Water
- Episode 22. Heat Energy Transfer by Conduction
- Episode 23. Heat Energy Transfer by Convection
- Episode 24. Heat Energy Transfer by Radiation
- Episode 25. Some Extraordinary Adventures (Evaporation, Boiling, Freezing)
- Episode 26. Some Miscellaneous and Wondrous Adventures in the Subject of Heat
- Episode 27. Extraordinarily Cold Stuff

=== Unit 2, Part II - The Physics of Toys ===
- Episode 28. The Physics of Toys: Mechanical
- Episode 29. The Physics of Toys: Acoustic and Thermal
- Episode 30. The Physics of Toys: Electrostatic, Magnetic and Miscellaneous

=== Unit 3, Part I - Waves and Sound ===
- Episode 31. Waves: Kinds and Properties
- Episode 32. Sound Waves - Sources of Sound
  - Frequency, pitch, how they relate to each other and correspond to musical notes.
  - Vibrating systems cause sound, sound requires a medium to travel.
  - Flexing different metal plates to produce different pitches.
  - Rotating plate with drilled holes and air blown through them – difference in sound between symmetrically drilled ones (music) and asymmetrically drilled ones (noise).
  - Vibrating a meter stick at different frequencies when different lengths stick out past a table.
  - Varying frequencies rubbing a thumbnail across the milled edge of a coin, when tearing various pieces of cloth, using different files on wood, or riffling a deck of cards.
  - Human hearing range (16 Hz to 16 kHz)
  - Nodes in vibrating bars and tuning forks.
  - Notched stick with a spinning propeller.
  - Turing an orchestra – why they don't use a piano.
- Episode 33. Vibrating Bars and Strings
  - Bar mounted on a resonating chamber, mounted at 2 important places.
  - Second, "identical" bar, beats between two bars that are 1 Hz out of tune.
  - Beats between two tuning forks, one with rubber bands around the end of a prong to reduce its frequency.
  - Vibrations of a metal bar, shown on screen with a long pipe.
  - If a vibrating bar is grasped at the nodes it will keep vibrating, anywhere else it will stop.
  - Nodes on a vibrating bar are 0.224 of the bar length from each end.
  - Tuning forks on resonant boxes – transferring vibration from one to another (didn't work).
  - Musical sticks.
  - Forming standing waves on a string, changing the number of nodes and antinodes at constant frequency and length by changing the tension.
  - Transferring vibrations from one vibrating bar to another through resonance.
- Episode 34. Resonance - Forced Vibrations
- Episode 35. Sounding Pipes
- Episode 36. Vibrating Rods and Plates
- Episode 37. Miscellaneous Adventures in Sound

=== Unit 3, Part II - Electricity and Magnetism ===
- Episode 38. Electrostatic Phenomena
- Episode 39. Adventures with Electric Charges
- Episode 40. Adventures in Magnetism
- Episode 41. Ways to "Produce" Electricity
- Episode 42. Properties and Effects of Electric Currents
- Episode 43. Adventures in Electromagnetism
- Episode 44. Further Adventures in Electromagnetism
- Episode 45. Miscellaneous and Wondrous Things in Electricity & Magnetism
