= The Hilarious House of Frightenstein =

Former CHCH TV Series

- Title card
- Created by: Ted Barris, Ross Perigoe
- Starring: Billy Van; Fishka Rais; Guy Big; Mitch Markowitz; Vincent Price; Julius Sumner Miller
- Theme music composer: Jean-Jacques Perrey, Harry Breuer, Gary Carol and Pat Prilly
- Opening theme: "March of the Martians"
- Country of origin: Canada
- No. of seasons: 1
- No. of episodes: 130

Production
- Producer: Rafael "Riff" Markowitz
- Camera setup: Single camera
- Running time: ~48 minutes

Original release
- Network: CHCH-TV
- Release: 1971

The Hilarious House of Frightenstein is a Canadian children's television series, which was produced by CHCH-TV, an independent station in Hamilton, Ontario, in 1971. It was syndicated both in Canada and internationally, and occasionally still appears in some television markets. In Canada, the series has not aired on broadcast TV for several years, and used to be available on the streaming service Crave. 100 episodes are now available on the free streaming service Tubi (2021), and Pluto TV (2024).

A quirky sketch comedy series that included some educational content amid its zany humour, the show's cast included Billy Van, Fishka Rais (1919–1974), Guy Big, Mitch Markowitz, Vincent Price, and Julius Sumner Miller. Van played most of the characters on the show. All 130 episodes were made in a nine-month span starting in 1971; the scenes with Miller were all filmed within one summer, and Price taped all of his scenes in four days.

In 2018, Headspinner Productions, the production firm of Ken Cuperus and Michelle Melanson, announced that it had acquired licensing and merchandising rights to the series, and was exploring the possibility of creating a new reboot. In 2021, the company announced an animated version for preschoolers, titled Happy House of Frightenstein.

In 2019, spoken word label Bleak December Inc completed a full-cast audio production, Return to Frightenstein. The audio drama is a licensed production featuring Malcolm McDowell standing in for Vincent Price as host, Canadian actor Anthony D. P. Mann voicing several of the characters (including The Count, The Librarian, The Oracle and Dr. Pet Vet), Steven Spencer as Igor, and original series actor and co-producer Mitch Markowitz returning as Super Hippy. Other voice actors include Nikolas Yuen as The Wolf, Man!, Terry Wade as Bwana Clyde Batty, comedian Dave Hudson as Harvey Wallbanger, and Anne-Marie Bergman as Grizelda. The album has been announced for release in the third quarter of 2019.

In 2024, Lev Gleason's New Friday announced a continuation of the series as a one-shot digest comic.

== Origins ==
The production started with Riff Markowitz envisioning the concept and then inviting a room full of creative friends to a spaghetti and champagne 'brainstorming' dinner party in his double suite at the Windsor Arms Hotel in Toronto.

CHCH had broadcast two other Markowitz shows: The Randy Dandy Show for children, starring Rafael Markowitz as Randy Dandy; and The Ed Allen Show, an exercise program. CHCH approved the production of Frightenstein to take advantage of the station's new ability to reach into the Toronto market for advertising money.

Horror icon Vincent Price starred in introductions for the show's various segments. Price, who was attracted to the project because he wanted to do something for kids, filmed all of his nearly 400 segments in four days for a fee of $13,000. Julius Sumner Miller, an American scientist and TV personality, appeared in every episode; although he put on a "mad scientist" persona, his segments featured straightforward science lessons and experiments.

On Canadian television stations, the show generally aired as a children's show in an after-school or weekend morning time slot. In the United States, however, many stations aired it in a late night slot aimed primarily at college students. In an interview with film critic Richard Crouse on CFRB in the 2010s, Markowitz's brother Mitch Markowitz – also an associate producer and bit-part performer on the show – acknowledged that while he and his brother always recognized the show had kid appeal because of the zany monster characters and lowbrow humour, it was always intended to also appeal to a young adult audience of alternative comedy fans. In some American markets, the show drew higher ratings than The Tonight Show with Johnny Carson among that demographic.

Writers of the series included Markowitz, Paul K. Willis and Michael Boncoeur.

== Characters ==
Count Frightenstein (Billy Van), Igor (Fishka Rais) and Brucie J. Monster

Although each episode was nominally structured around the basic narrative premise of Count Frightenstein's efforts to revive Brucie J. Monster, a Frankenstein-like monster, only some sketches (including the first sketch of each episode) directly addressed the premise itself, while most sketches depicted unrelated goings-on around the castle. Only the two main characters appeared in the "plot" sketches, although they could also appear in other sketches as well, while the supplementary characters generally only appeared in their own standalone sketches and were not part of the core "plot" sketches. This was primarily due to Van playing most featured characters; Van never appeared opposite Miller or Price on screen.

=== Main ===
- Count Frightenstein (Van), the main character, was the 13th son of Count Dracula. He had been exiled to Castle Frightenstein in Frankenstone for his failure to revive Brucie. The core premise of the show was that he would be allowed to return to Transylvania only when he succeeded in his quest. Count Frightenstein was also a "black sheep" vampire in other ways, including his strong preference for eating pizza rather than drinking human blood. He also fancies himself an inventor, although his inventions generally have one of three faults: they are either dangerous, useless, or already a common household object upon which his version is not an improvement.
- Igor (Fishka Rais) was Frightenstein's incompetent assistant.

=== Supporting ===
Supporting characters were played by Billy Van, except where specified.

- The Wolfman – A werewolf disk jockey at radio station EECH who spun rock and roll records while doing a Wolfman Jack impression. The Wolfman's theme song was Sly and the Family Stone's "I Want to Take You Higher". The segment featured then-current hit singles by The Rolling Stones, Sly and the Family Stone, Three Dog Night or other Top 40 radio stars of the time (which were referred to as ‘golden oldies’ in order to avoid dating the program), with the Wolfman and Igor dancing in silhouette against a psychedelic background. Due to licensing reasons, the musical numbers are no longer shown on some reruns, although broadcasts on YTV in the early 2000s included the segments.
- The Grammar Slammer – The Grammar Slammer was a disembodied voice (Van) who challenged Igor to correct grammatical errors, accompanied by an eight-foot purple monster named Bammer (worn and voiced by Joe Torbay) who threatened to beat up Igor if he failed.
- The Professor (Julius Sumner Miller) – A professor who provided genuine science lessons on such things as thermal expansion and the cartesian diver, in the vein of Why Is It So?
- Bwana Clyde Batty – A British explorer who teaches about wild animals on Zany Zoo. His name is a spoof of animal trainer Clyde Beatty. His catchphrase is "ooga booga!"
- Dr. Pet Vet – A veterinarian who teaches about domestic animals (whereas Zany Zoo was about wild fauna). He always offers the day's animal to Igor as a pet, but the Sloth in the basement invariably refuses to allow Igor to keep the animal. There were episodes in which Pet Vet did not actually appear on camera, but would communicate with Igor over the phone after sending the day's animal over.
- Grizelda, the Ghastly Gourmet – A witch voiced as a parody of Julia Child, who provides a version of a television cooking show as she cooks suitably ghastly recipes in her cauldron. In every one of her segments, she bangs her head on the pot above her cauldron and finally tastes her recipe with a loud slurping sound (sometimes declaring the recipe a failure after it causes a small explosion).
- The Librarian – An elderly curmudgeon who unsuccessfully tries to scare the viewers by reading children's stories, such as "Humpty Dumpty" and "Henny Penny", which he thinks are horror stories. He also sometimes reads fables with unpleasant endings. He eventually admits to not being any more frightened than the viewers, but considers reading important nonetheless.
- The Maharishi – A Hindu guru who shares bits of mystically inscrutable wisdom (e.g. "It is written, that he who kicks the blind beggar, in the marketplace, during an eclipse, can only curse the camel, for its lack of discipline.") A large bag of flowers (dyed carnations) would then fall on top of his head, after which he would make the peace sign.
- The Oracle – A mystic who reads out horoscopes in a Peter Lorre voice, invariably knocking over and breaking his crystal ball in the process. He also would often get his hand temporarily stuck inside his replacement crystal ball. He then answers questions supposedly sent in from viewers.
- The Mini-Count (Guy Big) is a three-foot tall clone of the Count, who appears in brief sketches where he tells a joke. Big was originally slated to play the main role as the Count, as the original character concept was based in part on the sight gag of a diminutive Count contrasted against Igor's imposing height and weight. However, Big was not experienced enough as an actor to properly maintain Count Frightenstein's desired accent, so the role was recast to star Van while a new smaller role was written for Big.

=== Puppets ===
Puppet characters were performed by puppeteer Joe Torbay.

- Harvey Wallbanger – The postmaster of Castle Frightenstein's "dead letter office", he would appear in sketches with the Count or Grizelda in which they answer letters.
- Gronk – A purple sea serpent who interacts with the Count or the Wolfman. Gronk would announce his presence with a loud call of "Gronk!" Gronk's segments usually had the Count reading a book; the Count would then start explaining what the book was about, with Gronk interrupting him, usually mid-sentence, with a completely incorrect conclusion to what the Count had been reading. This would happen several times, leading to greater and greater frustration on the part of the Count. Segments with the Wolfman were generally one-line or two-line jokes.
- Bammer – A large purple monster who assisted the Grammar Slammer in correcting Igor's poor grammar.

=== Minor or interstitial characters ===
- Super Hippy (Mitch Markowitz) — A hippie in a superhero costume who appears leading in and out of commercials, sitting or flying in varying locations as he delivers some variation on "Don't change the channel; we'll be right back after these commercials".
- The Singing Soldier (Van) — A light-operetta styled palace guard who gets a cream pie thrown in his face whenever he starts to sing "Indian Love Call" from Rose-Marie.
- The Mosquito (Mitch Markowitz) – A mosquito who tells a bad joke about insects before biting a human foot.
- The Gorilla (Van or Paul Schultz) – A gorilla who would walk out of the jungle and invariably try to scare whomever he was looking at. In every segment, however, he would be thwarted by a ping-pong ball that would hit him square in the head, causing him to keel over. He often tried to avoid the ping-pong balls, in one instance by holding up a parasol.

== Home media ==
On October 18, 2005, Empire Pictures released a single DVD featuring a handful of half-hour U.S.-syndicated episodes. The most significant change for these episodes as broadcast (apart from the length) was the addition of a laugh track.

On October 17, 2006, Alliance Atlantis Home Video in Canada released a three-disc box set of 13 full-length episodes, with restored Wolfman segments. The shows are not in chronological order, as only episodes that had thus far obtained music clearances for the Wolfman dance segments were included. The Wolfman theme, Sly & the Family Stone's "I Want to Take You Higher", had not yet been cleared, so the opening was altered with new music by the Tijuana Bibles from Toronto, and Van's voice was redubbed by another Toronto voice actor, as Van himself had died in 2003. For recent airings in Canada on the cable networks Drive-In Classics and Space, the main Frightenstein theme is also a re-recording, because of licensing restrictions by Morning Music, Ltd.

Critical Mass Releasing Inc. of Toronto released the series in 2006 for broadcast on CHUM Television stations.

A second set of nine episodes was released by Critical Mass in late 2008.

On July 19, 2019, the entire series, without the Wolfman segments, became available to stream on Crave in Canada.

== Graphic Novel ==
The popularity of the series led co-creator/original cast member Mitch Markowitz to create a digest comic that serves as a continuation of the original series. Published by Lev Gleason's New Friday and written by Carson Demmans with art by Jason Sylvestre.

== Memorable quotes ==
- Opening Poem – Vincent Price – "Another lovely day begins, for ghosts and ghouls with greenish skin. So close your eyes and you will find that you've arrived in Frightenstein. Perhaps the Count will find a way to make his monster work today. For if he solves this monster-mania, he can return to Transylvania! So welcome where the sun won't shine, to the castle of Count Frightenstein!" (this dissolved into maniacal laughter).
- National Anthem – Igor/Fishka Rais – "Gory, gory Transylvania! The werewolves and bats will always maim ya. The murky moors will likely claim ya, As we go stumbling through, through, through, through." Sung to the tune of "The Battle Hymn of the Republic". Sung once by Igor before the Count recites the Pledge, hummed by him during the Count's Pledge, and repeated afterwards by him as a big finish ("Gory, gory, Transylvania! As we go stumbling...") usually topped off by the Count singing the last word ("through!").
- Pledge – Count/Billy Van – "I pledge by the sign of the three-toed sloth, that I will do my best to do my duty. To always obey the laws of the werewolf pack. And to never rest, until Brucie lives once more, and takes his rightful place in the annals of distinguished monsters, and I can once again return to that most goriest of homelands ..." (many times the Count is showing off his heart-shaped three-toed sloth pendant (on an elastic black string around his neck) to the camera. After the first line, he lets go of it, it flies back against his throat, and the Count does a choked/injured double take before going on with the rest of the pledge).
- Closing Poem – Vincent Price – "The castle lights are growing dim. There's no one left but me – and him. [he nods towards Brucie behind him] When next we meet in Frankenstone ... don't come alone."

== Legacy ==
The Hilarious House of Frightenstein was referenced in the first episode of the Ed the Sock program This Movie Sucks!, which is another program produced and broadcast by CHCH. In the episode the hosts refer to them being in a studio that has produced many classic television shows, and Ed comments that they have the coffee maker from The Hilarious House of Frightenstein, along with the original coffee.

Comedian Mike Myers acknowledged the show as an important formative influence on his comedy in his 2016 book Mike Myers' Canada.

James "Jimbo" Insell, a Canadian drag queen most noted for competing on the first season of Canada's Drag Race, cited The Hilarious House of Frightenstein as one of the models for House of Jimbo, a comedy/variety series he plans to produce.

Return to Frightenstein, a full-cast audio play produced by Bleak December was released on streaming platforms in September, 2019.

Happy House of Frightenstein, an animated reboot which follows the adventures of Count Jr., Igor, Griselda, the Wolfman and Gronk as children, premiered on Family Jr. in 2021.
