= Hugh Cossart Baker Jr. =

Hugh Cossart Baker Jr. (9 December 1846, in Hamilton, Canada West – 18 March 1931) was a businessman and telephone pioneer.

On June 20, 1877, Baker started up the first commercial telephone service in Canada in the city of Hamilton, Ontario. Then in 1878, he made the first telephone exchange in the British Empire. This was also the second telephone exchange in all of North America. The following season on 15 May 1879 he made Hamilton the site of the first commercial long-distance telephone line in the British Empire. In 1880, (April 29) Hugh Cossart Baker Jr. received a charter to build a national telephone company in Hamilton, Ontario. It was called the Hamilton Telephone Company and this was the charter that enabled the creation of the Bell Telephone Company in Canada. Hugh Cossart Baker Jr. became the manager of the Ontario division until he retired in 1909. The first telephone had been leased to Prime Minister Alexander Mackenzie in September 1877. Baker learned of Alexander Graham Bell's invention in 1877 at the Philadelphia International Exposition and from there decided to test the communication tool in Hamilton. He leased four telephones for himself and his chess partners and on August 29, 1877, the telephone replaced the telegraph as the means to discuss their chess moves. Baker is also credited with helping to create the Hamilton Street Railway Company, the Hamilton Real Estate Association and the Canada Fire and Marine Insurance Company - all before he was 30 years old.

His father, Hugh Cossart Baker Sr., established the first life insurance company in Canada on 21 August 1847; the Canada Life Assurance Company.
