= Guy Big =

Canadian actor

- Born: Alan Herbert Hoffman; 26 February 1946; Ebenezer, Saskatchewan
- Died: 2 May 1978 (aged 32); Toronto, Ontario
- Occupations: Actor, social worker
- Years active: 1970s

Alan Herbert Hoffman (26 February 1946 – 2 May 1978), known by the stage name Guy Big, was a Canadian actor. He was most noted for his role in the children's television series The Hilarious House of Frightenstein as the Midget Count, although he also appeared in the movie Find the Lady as Miniature Man, in the King of Kensington episode "Tiny's Job" as the character Tiny Russell, and a guest on The Tommy Hunter Show. Before his death he filmed a television adaptation of Isaac Asimov's "The Ugly Little Boy" which aired in 1977 on TVOntario.

Hoffman spent his childhood in Yorkton, Saskatchewan, then attended the University of Alberta. During his years in Toronto, he also became a social worker and earned a relevant degree at Ryerson Polytechnical Institute. He had originally been slated to play the lead role of The Count in Hilarious House of Frightenstein, as the original character concept had been based on the sight gag of a diminutive count contrasted against the height and weight of Fishka Rais as the Count's assistant Igor; however, as a novice actor Big struggled with the Count's accent, so a new role was written for him as the Midget Count while the role of the main Count was given to Billy Van.

He died aged 32 in Toronto from an unspecified cause, although he was reportedly treated for throat cancer in 1977.
