= Why Is It So? =

- Genre: Educational television
- Presented by: Julius Sumner Miller
- Country of origin: Australia
- Original language: English

Original release
- Network: ABC Television
- Release: 1963 – 1986

Why Is It So? is an educational science series produced in Australia by ABC Television from 1963 to 1986. The series was hosted by American scientist Julius Sumner Miller, who demonstrated experiments in the world of physics. The series was also screened in the United States, Canada, New Zealand and in Europe.

This program was based on his 1959 series Why Is It So? in the United States on KNXT (now KCBS-TV) Channel 2 in Los Angeles.

Several segments from the program have been uploaded to the ABC Science YouTube channel.
