= Joe Torbay =

Canadian puppeteer (1941–2009)

Joe Torbay (August 13, 1941 – October 10, 2009) was a Canadian puppeteer and television personality. He was best known for puppeteering the characters of Gronk, Harvey Wallbanger, and Grammar Slammer Bammer in the television series The Hilarious House of Frightenstein.

Torbay also was regularly on CKWR-FM radio in Waterloo, Ontario, Canada.
