= Hugh Cossart Baker Sr. =

Hugh Cossart Baker Sr. (September 1818 in Kent, England – March 2, 1859 in Savannah, Georgia, USA) was a banker, businessman, and mathematician.

Baker established the first life insurance company in Canada August 21, 1847; the Canada Life Assurance Company. The firm was incorporated in 1849. The first head office was in Hamilton, Ontario on the top floor of the Mechanics' Institute on James Street North near Merrick, where Eaton's now stands. The head office remained in Hamilton until 1900, when the new president George Cox moved it to Toronto.

He was the father of telephone pioneer Hugh Cossart Baker Jr.
