= Julius Sumner Miller =

American physicist

- Born: May 17, 1909; Billerica, Massachusetts, US
- Died: April 14, 1987 (aged 77); Torrance, California, US
- Education: Boston University
- Known for: Children's television
- Scientific career
- Fields: Physics education

Julius Sumner Miller (May 17, 1909 – April 14, 1987) was an American physicist and television personality. He is best known for his work on children's television programs in North America and Australia.

== Off-screen ==
Julius Sumner Miller was born in Billerica, Massachusetts, as the youngest of nine children. His father was Latvian and his Lithuanian mother spoke 12 languages. He was of Jewish descent.

Miller graduated with a master's degree in physics from Boston University in 1933. Due to the Great Depression, he and his wife Alice (née Brown) worked as a butler and maid for a wealthy Boston doctor for the following two years. They had no children, but he reached millions of children through his popular science programs.

In 1937, after submitting over 700 job applications, he was offered a place in the physics department of Dillard University, a private, African American liberal arts college in New Orleans. During World War II, he worked as a civilian physicist for the US Army Signal Corps while holding fellowships in physics at the universities of Idaho and Oklahoma. He was a Ford Foundation fellow at the University of California, Los Angeles.

In 1950, Miller won a Carnegie Grant that allowed him to visit Albert Einstein at his home in Princeton, New Jersey and visit the Institute for Advanced Study. He greatly admired Einstein and went on to amass a collection of Einstein memorabilia. In 1952, he joined the physics department at the then-small El Camino College in Torrance, California (1952–1974), to maximum student enrollments due to his great popularity and where he was instantly recognizable by his casual hair and horn-rimmed eyeglasses.

Miller was intolerant of misspelled words and misplaced punctuation, and often angered his colleagues because he charged that the students of most faculties were not learning enough. During an interview, he stated that intellectual life in America was in trouble, a belief he held for the rest of his life.

We are approaching a darkness in the land. Boys and girls are emerging from every level of school with certificates and degrees, but they can't read, write or calculate. We don't have academic honesty or intellectual rigor. Schools have abandoned integrity and rigor.

From 1963 to 1986, Miller was the visiting lecturer for the physics department of the University of Sydney; from 1965 to 1985, he taught at the United States Air Force Academy.

== Television ==
In 1959, Miller began hosting his educational program, Why Is It So?, on KNXT (now KCBS-TV) Channel 2 in Los Angeles. From 1962 to 1964, he was Disney's "Professor Wonderful" on new introductions, filmed at Disneyland, to the syndicated reruns of The Mickey Mouse Club. He also starred in the Disney series Great Moments in Science and Science and its Magic. During the same period, he appeared on a semi-regular basis, performing physics experiments, on Steve Allen's late-night TV show in Hollywood, syndicated by Group W. Eventually, he also had his own TV shows in Australia, Canada, Norway, and New Zealand.

Miller's first television appearance in Australia was on Bob Sanders People in 1963. In an improvised physics demonstration, he attempted to drive a drinking straw through a raw potato. A paper straw normally is not strong enough, but if one pinches the end, the trapped air acts as a piston, easily piercing the potato. For the first time in his career, he could not get this to work, and he loudly exclaimed: "Australian straws ain't worth a damn!" The next morning, Miller arrived at his Sydney University laboratory to find one million drinking straws on the floor with a telegram reading "You might find one of these fitting your requirements". He later stated, "I sat amongst the straws with straws stuck in my hair and ears. But clearly I had made a mistake. I should have said: 'Australian potatoes ain't worth a damn', and I'd have cornered the potato market!"

Shortly after, he was offered a job presenting science for Australia's ABC Television. When asked how much money he wanted, he replied that he never asked, he listened to an offer, then "multiplied it by a factor between two and ten". Due to budget constraints, the offer was withdrawn, but an agreement was reached for Miller to host his own science-based TV series, which was filmed at the University of Sydney, where he taught. Why Is It So? (the program title, which also would become his stock phrase), broadcast from 1963 to 1986 and became an instant hit known for its "cool experiments, interesting science, and fantastic hair". The 1960s program became Demonstrations in Physics (also called Science Demonstrations when it was aired on American PBS television). He introduced each episode with the line:

How do you do, ladies and gentlemen, and boys and girls [sometimes adding some others like: and teachers, and fathers, and mothers, and people].
I am Julius Sumner Miller, and physics is my business [whereupon often presenting the subject of each lesson after the characteristic phrase: And my very special business today is ...]

Around 1963, Miller was also one of the team of celebrity lecturers in the University of Sydney's pioneering "Summer School of Science", broadcast early in the morning during Australia's long summer holidays in January. Fellow presenters included physicist Harry Messel and the molecular biologist James Watson, but decades ahead of his work on the Human Genome.

My first TV series on demonstrations in physics – titled Why Is It So? – were now seen and heard over the land. The mail was massive. The academics were a special triumph for me. They charged me with being superficial and trivial. If I had done what they wanted my programs would be as dull as their classes! I knew my purpose well and clear: to show how Nature behaves without cluttering its beauty with abstruse mathematics. Why cloud the charm of a Chladni plate with a Bessel function?

Miller's on-air popularity was due to an enthusiasm not normally associated with serious science. Shows would be liberally sprinkled with phrases such as "He who is not stirred by the beauty of it is already dead!" and he also liked to trick the audience. A common ploy would be to hold up an empty glass and ask guests to confirm it was empty....then chide them for not noticing it was full of air. Before each demonstration, he would usually ask for a show of hands to indicate which of several results they expected. Often, he would then add, "hands up those who don't care".

In 1964, Miller suffered a near-fatal heart attack. Scheduled to give a lecture in Australia, he sent Sydney University a telegram saying, "I've dropped dead here." He would suffer a second heart attack in 1986.

In 1966, questions from his show with an answer to the previous day's question were published as "Millergrams" in The Australian newspaper. A selection of 112 of these questions was published as a book Millergrams; Some Enchanting Questions for Enquiring Minds. Further books were published in 1967: The Second Book of Millergrams: Some More Enchanting Questions for Enquiring Minds, and 1988: Why is it So?: The Very Best Millergrams of Professor Julius Sumner Miller.

Sample Millergram:

Q32: A juggler comes to a footbridge of rather flimsy design. He has in hand four balls. The maximum load is no more than the juggler himself and one ball. Can he get across the bridge by juggling the balls, always having at most one ball in the hand (and three in the air)?

A: No. A falling ball exerts a force on the hand greater than its own weight. Rather, a "thrown" ball exerts greater force than a "held" one. That is, the additional force equal and opposite to that imparted to a flung ball, in addition to the juggler's mass, would exceed the bridge's tolerance (the bridge can tolerate a juggler and held ball, but not the additional downward force associated with forcing a ball "up").

Miller appeared as "The Professor" in the Canadian series The Hilarious House of Frightenstein (1971), in a 4- to 5-minute segment each episode where he demonstrated physics experiments and explained the principles involved.

In 1974, Miller made The Professor and the Enquiring Minds in Australia, which was shown on the 7 network stations. This consisted of a panel of three school students who were peppered with questions about what they expected to happen in the experiment Miller then conducted, and were then asked to explain the experiment's results.

In the 1970s, Miller was also an occasional guest on The Tonight Show Starring Johnny Carson in the United States.

== Commercials ==
During the 1980s, Miller appeared in a famous series of Australian television commercials for Cadbury chocolate, using his stock phrase "Why is it so?", demonstrating a simple scientific principle, and describing how each block of chocolate "embraces substantial nourishment and enjoyment", and contained "a glass and a half of full-cream dairy milk". The ads were sufficiently popular to be played for some years after his death.

While in Australia, Miller also appeared in ads for non-stick saucepans and Ampol petroleum, which included demonstrations of real principles of physics, albeit briefly.

== Death ==
In February 1987, Miller became ill while visiting Australia and returned to the United States, where he was diagnosed with leukemia. Miller died six weeks later on April 14, 1987, in Torrance, California. In accordance with his will, no services were held, and Miller's body went to the University of Southern California's School of Dentistry.

== Foundations ==
Professor Miller's wife, Alice Brown Miller, wanted to perpetuate the memory and achievements of her husband, and so conceived the idea of the Julius Sumner Miller Foundation, which was established in 1998.

Through an offer by Cadbury-Schweppes Pty Ltd, the Cadbury-Julius Sumner Miller Scholarship for Academic Excellence was established to provide undergraduate scholarships in the School of Physics at the University of Sydney.

In 1993, the Australian Science Foundation for Physics established the Julius Sumner Miller Fellowship in his memory. The fellowship is currently held by Karl Kruszelnicki, best known as "Doctor Karl" for his appearances on Australian radio and television as a science commentator and author.

== Popular culture ==
In 1966, Miller devised a word game, Milleranagrams, which was published in Australia by John Sands Limited. The game, whose only materials were 200 Scrabble-like letter tiles, required players in their turn to draw an unseen tile from the "pool" then either make a word from their stock of tiles or add a tile to a word already on the table (rearrangement of the letters being permitted, hence the name) to form another word.

Miller remains popular in Australia, where he is still quoted. The phrase As Professor Julius Sumner Miller often asked, "Why is it so?" and its variations are still often used in newspaper articles that pose questions, even those unrelated to science.

A rock band in Calgary, Alberta, founded in 2013, named itself Julius Sumner Miller, having seen him on The Hilarious House of Frightenstein. Their first album, released in 2016, is titled Why Is It So?

== Bibliography ==
- Time: Selected Lectures On Time and Relativity, the Arrow of Time, and the Relation of Geological and Biological Time and On Men of Science, Shakespeare Head Press, 1965
- Millergrams; Some Enchanting Questions for Enquiring Minds, Ure Smith, 1966
- The Second Book of Millergrams: Some More Enchanting Questions for Enquiring Minds, Ure Smith, 1967
- Quiz Questions in Physics, Horwitz-Martin, Australia 1967
- Physics Fun and Demonstrations, Central Scientific Company, 1968
- Why It Is So, ABC books, 1971 ISBN 0-642-97296-6
- The Kitchen Professor, ABC books, 1972 ISBN 0-642-97352-0
- Why It Is So: Heat and Temperature, ABC books, 1973 ISBN 0-642-97496-9
- Why It Is So: Sound and Electricity & Magnetism, ABC books, 1973 ISBN 0-642-97584-1
- Why It Is So: Mechanics, Heat & Temperature, Sound and Electricity, ABC books, 1978 ISBN 0-642-97523-X
- Enchanting Questions for Enquiring Minds, Currey/O'Neil, 1982 ISBN 0-85902-280-3
- Why is it so?: the very best Millergrams of Professor Julius Sumner Miller, Australian Red Cross Society, Ringwood, Vic; Penguin Books, 1988
- The Days of My Life: An Autobiography, Macmillan, 1989. ISBN 0-333-50337-6

== Discography ==
=== Albums ===
- Professor Julius Sumner Miller (Professor Wonderful) Relating Stories of Isaac Newton (Walt Disney Productions 1964)
- Professor Julius Sumner Miller (Professor Wonderful) Relating Stories of Galileo (Walt Disney Productions 1964)
- Professor Julius Sumner Miller (Professor Wonderful) Relating Stories of Benjamin Franklin (Walt Disney Productions 1964)
- Professor Julius Sumner Miller (Professor Wonderful) Relating Stories of Michael Faraday (Walt Disney Productions 1964)

== See also ==
- Don Herbert (Mr. Wizard)
