= Parlor, Bedroom and Bath =

Parlor, Bedroom and Bath may refer to:

- Parlor, Bedroom and Bath (1920 film), an American silent comedy film directed by Edward Dillon
- Parlor, Bedroom and Bath (1931 film), an American pre-Code comedy film starring Buster Keaton
