= Hamilton West (federal electoral district) =

Former federal electoral district in Ontario, Canada

Ontario electoral district

Defunct federal electoral district
- Legislature: House of Commons
- District created: 1903
- District abolished: 2004
- First contested: 1904
- Last contested: 2000

Hamilton West was a federal electoral district in Ontario, Canada, that was represented in the House of Commons of Canada from 1904 to 2004.

== History ==
The federal riding was created when the old riding of Hamilton was split in 1903.

In 1903, the city of Hamilton was divided into two electoral districts: Hamilton East and Hamilton West. Hamilton West consisted of wards 2, 3, 4, and 5 of the city. The boundaries expanded ever eastward as the population centre did, but it always included the neighbourhoods of Ainslie Wood, Westdale and downtown Hamilton.

In 1914, it was redefined to consist of the western part of the city of Hamilton described by a line drawn from the brow of the mountain along Dundurn Street, west along Aberdeen Avenue, north along Paradise Road to Cootes Paradise, along the south and east margins of the marsh to Burlington Bay, east along the bay, south along Hughson Street, east along King Street, south along Ferguson Avenue, west along Aberdeen Avenue and the Mountain Brow.

In 1924, it was redefined to consist of the part of the city of Hamilton lying west of Wellington Street, east of Paradise Road, and north of Cootes Paradise.

In 1935, it was redefined to exclude the part lying south of Concession Street, Claremont Drive and West Fifth Street.

In 1952, it was redefined to consist of the part of the city of Hamilton lying north of the brow of the mountain and west of a line drawn from north to south along Wellington Street and its prolongation south to the brow of the mountain.

In 1966, it was redefined to consist of the part of the City of Hamilton bounded as follows: commencing where Wellington Street meets the shore of Hamilton Harbour, south along Wellington Street, east along Robert Street, south along East Avenue, east along Main Street, south along Wentworth Street, west along the brow of the Mountain to the west city limit.

In 1976, it was redefined to consist of the part of the City of Hamilton lying west and north of a line drawn south along Wentworth Street from Hamilton Harbour, east along Main Street East, south along Sherman Avenue, and west along the brow of the Mountain to the city limit.

In 1987, it was redefined to consist of the part of the City of Hamilton lying west and north of a line drawn from north to south from the northern city limit, south along Wentworth Street, east along Cannon Street, south along Sherman Avenue, west along the brow of the Niagara Escarpment, to the western limit of the city.

In 1996, it was redefined to consist of the part of the City of Hamilton lying west and north of a line drawn from where westerly limit of the city meets Lisajane Court to Stone Church Road, east along Stone Church Road, north along Garth Street, east along Lincoln Alexander Expressway, north along West Fifth Street, east along the brow of the Niagara Escarpment, north to and along Wentworth Street, west along Main Street, north along Wellington Street, east along Burlington Street, and north along the spur line of the Canadian National Railway to the northern city limit.

The electoral district was abolished in 2003 when it was redistributed between Ancaster—Dundas—Flamborough—Westdale, Hamilton Centre and Hamilton Mountain ridings.

== Members of Parliament ==
This riding elected the following members of the House of Commons of Canada:

Parliament	Years	Member	Party
Hamilton West; Riding created from Hamilton
10th	1904–1908	Adam Zimmerman	Liberal
11th	1908–1911	Thomas Joseph Stewart	Conservative
12th	1911–1917	Thomas Joseph Stewart	Conservative
13th	1917–1921	Thomas Joseph Stewart	Conservative
14th	1921–1925	Thomas Joseph Stewart	Conservative
15th	1925–1926	Charles William Bell	Conservative
16th	1926–1930	Charles William Bell	Conservative
17th	1930–1935	Charles William Bell	Conservative
18th	1935–1937	Herbert Earl Wilton	Conservative
18th	1937–1940	John Allmond Marsh	Conservative
19th	1940–1945	Colin W. G. Gibson	Liberal
20th	1945–1949	Colin W. G. Gibson	Liberal
21st	1949–1950	Colin W. G. Gibson	Liberal
21st	1950–1953	Ellen Fairclough	Progressive Conservative
22nd	1953–1957	Ellen Fairclough	Progressive Conservative
23rd	1957–1958	Ellen Fairclough	Progressive Conservative
24th	1958–1962	Ellen Fairclough	Progressive Conservative
25th	1962–1963	Ellen Fairclough	Progressive Conservative
26th	1963–1965	Joseph Macaluso	Liberal
27th	1965–1968	Joseph Macaluso	Liberal
28th	1968–1972	Lincoln Alexander	Progressive Conservative
29th	1972–1974	Lincoln Alexander	Progressive Conservative
30th	1974–1979	Lincoln Alexander	Progressive Conservative
31st	1979–1980	Lincoln Alexander	Progressive Conservative
32nd	1980–1980	Lincoln Alexander	Progressive Conservative
32nd	1980–1984	Stanley Hudecki	Liberal
33rd	1984–1988	Peter Peterson	Progressive Conservative
34th	1988–1993	Stan Keyes	Liberal
35th	1993–1997	Stan Keyes	Liberal
36th	1997–2000	Stan Keyes	Liberal
37th	2000–2004	Stan Keyes	Liberal
Riding dissolved into Hamilton Centre, Ancaster—Dundas—Flamborough—Westdale and Hamilton Mountain

== Federal election results ==
1904 Canadian federal election
Party	Candidate	Votes
Liberal	Adam Zimmerman	3,345
Conservative	Frank C. Bruce	3,108

1908 Canadian federal election
Party	Candidate	Votes
Conservative	Thomas Joseph Stewart	3,363
Liberal	Adam Zimmerman	2,969

1911 Canadian federal election
Party	Candidate	Votes
Conservative	Thomas Joseph Stewart	4,390
Liberal	John Inglis McLaren	2,570
Unknown	Hiram Dickhout	522

1917 Canadian federal election
Party	Candidate	Votes
Government (Unionist)	Thomas Joseph Stewart	6,451
Labour	Walter Ritchie Rollo	3,678
Opposition (Laurier Liberals)	John Inglis McLaren	2,610

1921 Canadian federal election
Party	Candidate	Votes
Conservative	Thomas Joseph Stewart	6,942
Progressive	Thomas James O'Heir	4,990
Liberal	William Ainslie	1,557

1925 Canadian federal election
Party	Candidate	Votes
Conservative	Charles William Bell	13,875
Liberal	George Alexander Gow	2,651

1926 Canadian federal election
Party	Candidate	Votes
Conservative	Charles William Bell	10,888
Liberal	Henry Carpenter	3,665

1930 Canadian federal election
Party	Candidate	Votes
Conservative	Charles William Bell	10,978
Liberal	Cranmer Egerton Riselay	6,275

1935 Canadian federal election
Party	Candidate	Votes
Conservative	Herbert Earl Wilton	7,857
Reconstruction	Nora-Frances Henderson	5,065
Liberal	Kennedy Connor	4,817
Liberal	William Ainslie	3,434
Co-operative Commonwealth	William Herbert Connor	2,203

On Mr. Wilton's death, 1 February 1937:

By-election on 22 March 1937
Party	Candidate	Votes
Conservative	John Allmond Marsh	8,102
Liberal	Kennedy Connor	7,295
Labour	John O'Hanley	3,536

1940 Canadian federal election
Party	Candidate	Votes
Liberal	Colin W. G. Gibson	13,965
National Government	John Allmond Marsh	11,032

1945 Canadian federal election
Party	Candidate	Votes
Liberal	Colin W. G. Gibson	11,439
Progressive Conservative	Chester William New	9,260
Co-operative Commonwealth	David Lewis	6,728
Labor–Progressive	Sam Sniderman	1,063

1949 Canadian federal election
Party	Candidate	Votes
Liberal	Colin W. G. Gibson	12,324
Progressive Conservative	Ellen Fairclough	9,252
Co-operative Commonwealth	John Stanley Allen	6,748

On Mr. Gibson's appointment as Puisne Judge of the Supreme Court of Ontario, 18 January 1950:

By-election on 15 May 1950
Party	Candidate	Votes
Progressive Conservative	Ellen Fairclough	8,008
Liberal	Harold F. Lazier	7,602
Co-operative Commonwealth	Alfred Henry Collingdon	3,235

1953 Canadian federal election
Party	Candidate	Votes
Progressive Conservative	Ellen Fairclough	13,016
Liberal	John Prendergast O'Reilly	10,044
Co-operative Commonwealth	Alex Muir	4,358

1957 Canadian federal election
Party	Candidate	Votes
Progressive Conservative	Ellen Fairclough	16,533
Liberal	John Munro	9,964
Co-operative Commonwealth	William Scandlan	4,363

1958 Canadian federal election
Party	Candidate	Votes
Progressive Conservative	Ellen Fairclough	19,863
Liberal	Dorothy Jane Crewe	6,094
Co-operative Commonwealth	William Scandlan	4,742

1962 Canadian federal election
Party	Candidate	Votes
Progressive Conservative	Ellen Fairclough	12,794
Liberal	Balys Bill Kronas	11,047
New Democratic	Gary Chertkoff	5,321
Communist	Alfred Dewhurst	421

1963 Canadian federal election
Party	Candidate	Votes
Liberal	Joseph Macaluso	13,701
Progressive Conservative	Ellen Fairclough	10,849
New Democratic	Gary Chertkoff	5,709
Social Credit	James Ian Buchan	442
Communist	Harry Hunter	283

1965 Canadian federal election
Party	Candidate	Votes
Liberal	Joseph Macaluso	13,247
Progressive Conservative	Lincoln Alexander	10,888
New Democratic	Tom Doyle	6,297
Social Credit	Reynolds H. James	199

1968 Canadian federal election
Party	Candidate	Votes
Progressive Conservative	Lincoln Alexander	13,580
Liberal	Thomas A. Beckett	13,238
New Democratic	Patricia Bruce	6,809

1972 Canadian federal election
Party	Candidate	Votes
Progressive Conservative	Lincoln Alexander	19,837
Liberal	Jack Burghardt	12,204
New Democratic	Peggy Leppert	5,420
Not affiliated	Bob Jaggard	218

1974 Canadian federal election
Party	Candidate	Votes
Progressive Conservative	Lincoln Alexander	15,421
Liberal	Milt Lewis	13,162
New Democratic	Gordon Holmes	4,890
Social Credit	Louis Deme	363
Communist	Bob Jaggard	138
Marxist–Leninist	Nola H. Moore	117

1979 Canadian federal election
Party	Candidate	Votes
Progressive Conservative	Lincoln Alexander	19,661
Liberal	Stanley Hudecki	13,859
New Democratic	Miriam Simpson	8,512
Communist	Edward McDonald	161
Marxist–Leninist	A.P. Daljeet	138

1980 Canadian federal election
Party	Candidate	Votes
Progressive Conservative	Lincoln Alexander	15,500
Liberal	Stanley Hudecki	14,929
New Democratic	Miriam Simpson	9,330
Rhinoceros	James E. S. Sabzali	304
Marxist–Leninist	A.P. Daljeet	139

Resignation of the Hon. Lincoln M. Alexander, 27 May 1980:

By-election on 8 September 1980
Party	Candidate	Votes
Liberal	Stanley Hudecki	12,565
Progressive Conservative	Jackie Isbester	9,882
New Democratic	Miriam Simpson	8,172
Libertarian	Chris Sorenson	133
Marxist–Leninist	Don McLean	120
Independent	John Turmel	88

1984 Canadian federal election
Party	Candidate	Votes
Progressive Conservative	Peter Peterson	16,573
Liberal	Stanley Hudecki	12,379
New Democratic	Philip Newell	11,508
Libertarian	Michael A. J. Baldasaro	300
Communist	Bob Mann	157
Commonwealth of Canada	Val Haché	135

1988 Canadian federal election
Party	Candidate	Votes
Liberal	Stan Keyes	16,598
Progressive Conservative	Peter Peterson	14,851
New Democratic	Lesley Russell	11,194
Christian Heritage	Barry Mombourquette	935
Independent	Walter A. Tucker	179
Communist	Bill Thompson	103

1993 Canadian federal election
Party	Candidate	Votes	%	Expenditures
Liberal	Stan Keyes	22,592	58.65	$38,319
Reform	George G. Mills	5,857	15.21	$30,042
Progressive Conservative	Peter Peterson	5,789	15.03	$34,188
New Democratic	Denise Giroux	3,143	8.16	$27,417
National	Owen Morgan	606	1.57	$1,152
Natural Law	Rita Rassenberg	396	1.03	$199
Independent	Elaine Couto	134	0.35	$244
Total valid votes		38,517	100.00	
Total rejected ballots		417		
Turnout		38,934	58.42	
Electors on the lists		66,640		
Source: Thirty-fifth General Election, 1993: Official Voting Results, Published by the Chief Electoral Officer of Canada. Financial figures taken from official contributions and expenses provided by Elections Canada.

1997 Canadian federal election
Party	Candidate	Votes
Liberal	Stan Keyes	20,951
New Democratic	Andrea Horwath	7,648
Progressive Conservative	John Findlay	6,510
Reform	Ken Griffith	6,285
Natural Law	Brian Rickard	323
Marxist–Leninist	Wendell Fields	170

2000 Canadian federal election
Party	Candidate	Votes
Liberal	Stan Keyes	21,273
Alliance	Leon O'Connor	7,293
New Democratic	Catherine Hudson	5,300
Progressive Conservative	Ron Blackie	5,024
Green	Hamish Jamie Campbell	616
Marijuana	Danielle Keir	437
Not affiliated	Stephen Downey	163
Natural Law	Rita Rassenberg	94
Communist	Mike Mirza	91
Marxist–Leninist	Wendell Fields	61

== See also ==
- List of Canadian electoral districts
- Historical federal electoral districts of Canada
