= Stan Keyes =

Canadian diplomat and politician

The Honourable Stan Keyes PC

MP for Hamilton West
- In office 1988–2004
- Preceded by: Peter Peterson
- Succeeded by: Riding dissolved

Personal details
- Born: May 17, 1953 (age 72) Hamilton, Ontario
- Party: Liberal
- Occupation: politician

Stanley Kazmierczak Keyes, PC (born May 17, 1953 in Hamilton, Ontario) is a Canadian diplomat and former politician.

== Before politics ==
Before entering politics, Keyes was a television news reporter from 1973 to 1988. He covered local news in Hamilton, Ontario, Queen’s Park, Toronto and Parliament Hill, Ottawa.

== Political career ==
Keyes was first elected to the House of Commons in 1988 election as the Liberal Party of Canada Member of Parliament for Hamilton West. He was reelected in 1993, 1997 and 2000 elections. In 2003, he was appointed Minister of National Revenue, Minister of State (Sport), Minister Responsible for the Canada Post Corporation and Minister Responsible for the Royal Canadian Mint. Keyes served as Parliamentary Secretary to the Minister of Transport from February 1996 to July 1998.

During the 2004 election, he ran as the Liberal candidate for the redistributed riding of Hamilton Centre, but was defeated by the New Democratic Party candidate David Christopherson, a former provincial cabinet minister.

For two years between 2002 and 2004, Keyes was Chair of the National Liberal Caucus and Chair of the National Liberal Caucus Executive Committee. Previously, he served as Chair of the House of Commons Standing Committee on Transport and Chair of the House of Commons Liaison Committee. From 1988 to 2003, Keyes was a member of the House of Commons Standing Committee on Industry, Standing Committee on Transport and the Standing Committee on Foreign Affairs and International Trade. He also led Government of Canada Task Forces on High Speed Rail, Airports, and the Canadian Sports System. His leadership on the Ports and Harbours Task Force earned him the American Association of Port Authorities (AAPA) Port Person of the Year Award, the first Canadian to be so honoured.

On August 2, 2005, Keyes was appointed Canadian consul general to Boston. The Conservative government of Stephen Harper replaced Keyes as Canada's representative in Boston on July 13, 2006, with Neil LeBlanc, a former Nova Scotia Tory finance minister and leadership candidate.

== After politics ==
On October 16, 2006, Keyes became the new President of the Canadian Payday Loan Association. He retired on April 17, 2016.

In November 2015, the Province of Ontario appointed Keyes to the Hamilton Port Authority Board of Directors.

In January 2017, Keyes was selected to serve on the Board of Directors of John C. Munro Hamilton International Airport.

== Personal life ==
Keyes is married to Catherine. They have two daughters, Caitlin and Hillary.

== Electoral record ==
1988 Canadian federal election: Hamilton West
Party	Candidate	Votes
Liberal	Stan Keyes	16,598
Progressive Conservative	Peter Peterson	14,851
New Democratic	Lesley Russell	11,194
Christian Heritage	Barry Mombourquette	935
Independent	Walter A. Tucker	179
Communist	Bill Thompson	103

1993 Canadian federal election: Hamilton West
Party	Candidate	Votes	%	Expenditures
Liberal	Stan Keyes	22,592	58.65	$38,319
Reform	George G. Mills	5,857	15.21	$30,042
Progressive Conservative	Peter Peterson	5,789	15.03	$34,188
New Democratic	Denise Giroux	3,143	8.16	$27,417
National	Owen Morgan	606	1.57	$1,152
Natural Law	Rita Rassenberg	396	1.03	$199
Independent	Elaine Couto	134	0.35	$244
Total valid votes		38,517	100.00	
Total rejected ballots		417		
Turnout		38,934	58.42	
Electors on the lists		66,640		
Source: Thirty-fifth General Election, 1993: Official Voting Results, Published by the Chief Electoral Officer of Canada. Financial figures taken from official contributions and expenses provided by Elections Canada.

1997 Canadian federal election: Hamilton West
Party	Candidate	Votes
Liberal	Stan Keyes	20,951
New Democratic	Andrea Horwath	7,648
Progressive Conservative	John Findlay	6,510
Reform	Ken Griffith	6,285
Natural Law	Brian Rickard	323
Marxist–Leninist	Wendell Fields	170

2000 Canadian federal election: Hamilton West
Party	Candidate	Votes
Liberal	Stan Keyes	21,273
Alliance	Leon O'Connor	7,293
New Democratic	Catherine Hudson	5,300
Progressive Conservative	Ron Blackie	5,024
Green	Hamish Jamie Campbell	616
Marijuana	Danielle Keir	437
Not affiliated	Stephen Downey	163
Natural Law	Rita Rassenberg	94
Communist	Mike Mirza	91
Marxist–Leninist	Wendell Fields	61

27th Canadian Ministry (2003–2006) – Cabinet of Paul Martin
Cabinet posts (2)
Predecessor	Office	Successor
Elinor Caplan	Minister of National Revenue; 2003–2004	John McCallum
	Minister of State (Sport); 2003–2004	Stephen Owen
Other offices
Preceded by Peter Peterson	Member of Parliament for Hamilton West; 1988–2004	Succeeded by riding abolished
