= Charles William Bell =

Canadian playwright, lawyer, politician

Charles William Bell (24 April 1876 – 8 February 1938) was a Canadian playwright, lawyer and politician, born in Hamilton, Ontario. He was Rocco Perri's lawyer.

Bell attended Hamilton Collegiate Institute and Trinity College, University of Toronto. He was called to the bar in 1899, after studies at Osgoode Hall. He practiced law in Toronto before moving back to Hamilton, and worked for a couple of local law firms before setting up his own firm, Bell & Yates.

Before 1930 he defended thirteen men on murder charges and all were acquitted. In the mid-1930s he defended David Meisner, accused of kidnapping London Beer Tycoon John Labatt. Despite a valiant effort by Bell (he only charged $400, most of which went to research and getting witnesses to come from the States - he was left with less than $125) to prove Meisner's innocence, the jury found him guilty and the judge sentenced him to 15 years in the Kingston Penitentiary in Ontario. Bell maintained that Meisner was innocent, and wrongly accused, even writing a book about it: "Who Said Murder?" published by Macmillan in Toronto in 1935. It was later found that Meisner was innocent, and he was acquitted.

He entered the world of politics and represented Hamilton West as a Conservative candidate in the 1925 Dominion election and won with a majority of 12,000 votes. Elected again in 1926 and 1930 and stepped down in 1935 due to the death of his son, Kenneth Clifford in an auto accident. He also enjoyed the theatre and became a playwright for a number of comedic plays. Bell's first successful play was Her First Divorce, which opened at the Comedy Theater on Broadway in New York in May 1913. His most successful play was Parlor, Bedroom and Bath, which opened in 1917 and ran for 232 performances. The play was twice made into a film, the first time in 1920, and again in 1931 starring Buster Keaton.

Combining law and theatre came naturally for he believed that watching an audience's reaction to his plays helped him to judge the character of witnesses in court. Bell would write in the morning before going to court or his law offices.

Bell was also a member of All Saints' Anglican Church and former Prime Minister Arthur Meighen was an honorary pallbearer at his funeral in 1938. Bell was buried in Woodland Cemetery.

Parliament of Canada
Preceded by Thomas Joseph Stewart	Member of Parliament for Hamilton West; 1925–1935	Succeeded by Herbert Earl Wilton
