= Colin W. G. Gibson =

Canadian politician

The Honourable Colin W. G. Gibson PC MC VD QC

Minister of Mines and Resources
- In office 1 April 1949 – 17 January 1950
- Prime Minister: Louis St. Laurent
- Preceded by: James Angus MacKinnon
- Succeeded by: Office Abolished

Secretary of State for Canada
- In office 12 December 1946 – 31 March 1949
- Prime Minister: W. L. Mackenzie King; Louis St. Laurent
- Preceded by: Paul Martin Sr.
- Succeeded by: Frederick Gordon Bradley

Minister of National Defence for Air
- In office 8 March 1945 – 11 December 1946
- Prime Minister: W. L. Mackenzie King
- Preceded by: Angus Lewis Macdonald
- Succeeded by: Office Abolished

Minister of National Revenue
- In office 8 July 1940 – 7 March 1945
- Prime Minister: W. L. Mackenzie King
- Preceded by: James Lorimer Ilsley
- Succeeded by: James Angus MacKinnon (acting)

Member of Parliament for Hamilton West
- In office 26 March 1940 – 17 January 1950
- Preceded by: John Allmond Marsh
- Succeeded by: Ellen Fairclough

Personal details
- Born: Colin William George Gibson; 16 February 1891 Hamilton, Ontario, Canada
- Died: 3 July 1974 (aged 83)
- Spouse: Florence Kerr (m. 1916)
- Children: 4, including Colin
- Relatives: John Morison Gibson (father)
- Occupation: Land surveyor; Lawyer

Military service
- Allegiance: Canada
- Branch/service: Royal Fusiliers 1914-1919; Royal Hamilton Light Infantry 1929-1934
- Years of service: 1911–1919
- Rank: Lieutenant-Colonel 1929-1934; Commandant 1935-1938

Colin William George Gibson PC MC VD QC (16 February 1891 – 3 July 1974) was a Canadian politician, land surveyor and lawyer.

== Career ==
He graduated from the Royal Military College of Canada in Kingston, Ontario in 1911 (cadet # 805), where Kenneth Stuart, a future Commander of the Canadian Army, was a fellow cadet. He served with the Royal Fusiliers of the British Army in 1914 and graduated from the University of Toronto in 1915 where he was a Member of Alpha Delta Phi. He was lieutenant-colonel of the Royal Hamilton Light Infantry from 1929 to 1934. He practiced law from 1919. He was a founding member of the Royal Military College of Canada ex-cadet club in Hamilton, Ontario in 1930. He became Commandant of Hamilton Garrison from 1935 to 1939.

As Member of Parliament for Hamilton West, he was reelected three times from 1940.03.26 to 1950. He was first elected as the Liberal Member of Parliament for Hamilton West in 1940, with 55.9% of the vote in a two candidate race. Following his election, he was appointed as Minister of National Revenue (1940.07.08 - 1945.03.07). Near the end of his first term, he was also appointed as the acting and later permanent Minister of National Defence for Air (1945.03.08 - 1946.12.11). He served as Secretary of State (1948.11.15 - 1949.03.31) and (1946.12.12 - 1948.11.14). He was Minister for Mines and Resources (1949.04.01 - 1950.01.17).

Following his re-election with 40.2% of the vote (in a three-way, four-party race), he continued as Minister of National Defence for Air (1945.01.11 - 1945.03.07). He was made the Secretary of State for Canada from December 12, 1946, to March 31, 1949, and Minister of Energy, Mines and Resources (Canada) from April 1, 1949, to January 17, 1950.

He was re-elected in 1949 (with 43.5% of the vote). He resigned from both cabinet and parliament upon his appointment as Puisne judge of the Supreme Court of Ontario. He died in 1974.

== Family ==
Gibson was the son of Major General Sir John Morison Gibson, former Attorney General of Ontario. His son, Colin D. Gibson, held the riding of Hamilton—Wentworth from 1968 to 1972.

== Legacy ==
The Gibson Medal at the Royal Military College of Canada is awarded to the top graduating student in the Arts Division.

== Books ==
- 4237 Dr. Adrian Preston & Peter Dennis (Edited) "Swords and Covenants" Rowman And Littlefield, London. Croom Helm. 1976.
- H16511 Dr. Richard Arthur Preston "To Serve Canada: A History of the Royal Military College of Canada" 1997 Toronto, University of Toronto Press, 1969.
- H16511 Dr. Richard Arthur Preston "Canada's RMC - A History of Royal Military College" Second Edition 1982
- H16511 Dr. Richard Preston "R.M.C. and Kingston: The effect of imperial and military influences on a Canadian community" 1968
- H1877 R. Guy C. Smith (editor) "As You Were! Ex-Cadets Remember". In 2 Volumes. Volume I: 1876–1918. Volume II: 1919–1984. Royal Military College. [Kingston]. The R.M.C. Club of Canada. 1984

Parliament of Canada
Preceded by John Allmond Marsh	Member for Hamilton West; 1940-1950	Succeeded by Ellen Fairclough
Preceded by Angus Lewis Macdonald	Minister of National Defence for Air; 1945-1946	Succeeded by None - position abolished
