= John Allmond Marsh =

Canadian politician

Member of Parliament for Hamilton West
- In office March 1937 – March 1940
- Preceded by: Herbert Earl Wilton
- Succeeded by: Colin W. G. Gibson

Personal details
- Born: John Allmond Marsh; 6 March 1894 Guelph, Ontario
- Died: 5 November 1952 (aged 58)
- Party: National Government; Conservative (1867–1942)
- Spouse: Marjorie Campbell
- Profession: business executive

John Allmond Marsh (6 March 1894 – 5 November 1952) was a Conservative member of the House of Commons of Canada. He was born in Guelph, Ontario and became a business executive.

Marsh attended public school at Hamilton, then Peterboro Collegiate Institute, then the University of Toronto. He was an alderman for Hamilton, Ontario from 1936 to 1937.

He was first elected to Parliament at the Hamilton West riding in a by-election on 22 March 1937. After completing the remaining months of the 18th Canadian Parliament, Marsh became a candidate under the National Government party banner but was defeated in the 1940 election by Colin W. G. Gibson of the Liberal party.
