= Peter Peterson (Canadian politician) =

Canadian politician

Peter James Peterson (born February 22, 1953) is a Canadian businessman and politician. Peterson was a Member of Parliament for the riding of Hamilton West, representing the Progressive Conservative Party of Canada.

A stockbroker by profession, Peterson was elected in the 1984 Canadian federal election, defeating incumbent Liberal MP Stanley Hudecki. In the 33rd Canadian Parliament, he served as a backbench supporter of Brian Mulroney's government. He lost to Liberal challenger Stan Keyes in the 1988 election. He challenged Keyes again unsuccessfully in 1993.

== Electoral record ==
1984 Canadian federal election
Party	Candidate	Votes
Progressive Conservative	Peter Peterson	16,573
Liberal	Stanley Hudecki	12,379
New Democratic	Philip Newell	11,508
Libertarian	Michael A. J. Baldasaro	300
Communist	Bob Mann	157
Commonwealth of Canada	Val Haché	135

1988 Canadian federal election: Hamilton West
Party	Candidate	Votes
Liberal	Stan Keyes	16,598
Progressive Conservative	Peter Peterson	14,851
New Democratic	Lesley Russell	11,194
Christian Heritage	Barry Mombourquette	935
Independent	Walter A. Tucker	179
Communist	Bill Thompson	103

1993 Canadian federal election: Hamilton West
Party	Candidate	Votes	%	Expenditures
Liberal	Stan Keyes	22,592	58.65	$38,319
Reform	George G. Mills	5,857	15.21	$30,042
Progressive Conservative	Peter Peterson	5,789	15.03	$34,188
New Democratic	Denise Giroux	3,143	8.16	$27,417
National	Owen Morgan	606	1.57	$1,152
Natural Law	Rita Rassenberg	396	1.03	$199
Independent	Elaine Couto	134	0.35	$244
Total valid votes		38,517	100.00	
Total rejected ballots		417		
Turnout		38,934	58.42	
Electors on the lists		66,640		
Source: Thirty-fifth General Election, 1993: Official Voting Results, Published by the Chief Electoral Officer of Canada. Financial figures taken from official contributions and expenses provided by Elections Canada.

Parliament of Canada
Preceded by Stanley Hudecki	Member for Hamilton West; 1984-1988	Succeeded by Stan Keyes
