= Joseph Macaluso =

Canadian politician (1931–2011)

- Official 1966 portrait

Member of Parliament for Hamilton West
- In office April 8, 1963 – June 24, 1968
- Preceded by: Ellen Fairclough
- Succeeded by: Lincoln Alexander

Personal details
- Born: Joseph Angelo Macaluso; April 6, 1931 Hamilton, Ontario, Canada
- Died: March 22, 2011 (aged 79)
- Party: Liberal
- Profession: Solicitor; Barrister

Joseph Angelo Macaluso (April 6, 1931 – March 22, 2011) was a Canadian Member of Parliament for the riding of Hamilton West, and a member of the Liberal Party of Canada.

He was elected in the 1963 Canadian federal election, serving until 1968 when he did not run again.

In the 1984 federal election he sought to make a return to Parliament for Lincoln, Ontario but was defeated.

Macaluso was a barrister/solicitor and served as an alderman for Hamilton, Ontario City Council from 1960 to 1963.

Parliament of Canada
Preceded by Ellen Fairclough	Member for Hamilton West; 1963-1968	Succeeded by Lincoln Alexander
