= Thomas Joseph Stewart =

Canadian politician

Thomas Joseph Stewart (July 26, 1848 – November 9, 1926) was a Canadian politician.

He was mayor of Hamilton, Ontario from 1907 to 1908. He was a Conservative Member of the House of Commons of Canada for the riding of Hamilton West from 1908 to 1925.

Parliament of Canada
Preceded by Adam Zimmerman	Member of Parliament from Hamilton West; 1908–1925	Succeeded by Charles William Bell
