= Adam Zimmerman =

Canadian politician (1852–1919)

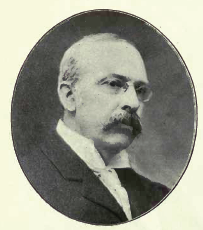

Member of the Canada Parliament for Hamilton West
- In office 1904–1908
- Succeeded by: Thomas Joseph Stewart

Personal details
- Born: August 14, 1852 Harrisburg, Pennsylvania, US
- Died: November 21, 1919 (aged 67)
- Party: Liberal

Adam Zimmerman (August 14, 1852 – November 21, 1919) was a Canadian politician.

Born in Harrisburg, Pennsylvania, the son of Isaac and Ottellia Zimmerman, German-Americans, Zimmerman was educated in Delaware, Ohio. A merchant, he was elected to the House of Commons of Canada for Hamilton West in the 1904 federal election. A Liberal, he was defeated in the 1908 election.
