= Ellen Fairclough =

Canadian politician (1905–2004)

The Right Honourable Ellen Fairclough PC CC OOnt
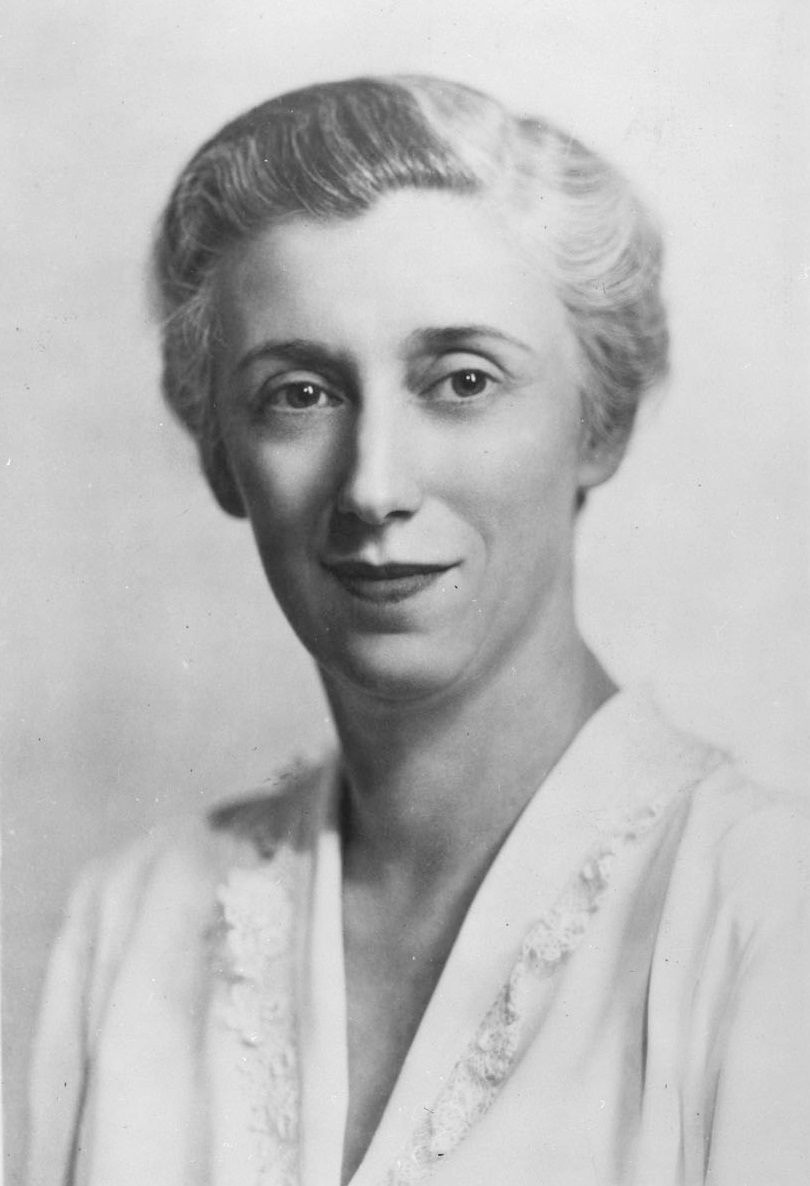
- Portrait by Arthur Roy, 1940s

Postmaster General of Canada
- In office August 9, 1962 – April 22, 1963
- Prime Minister: John Diefenbaker
- Preceded by: William McLean Hamilton
- Succeeded by: Azellus Denis

Minister of Citizenship and Immigration
- In office May 12, 1958 – August 8, 1962
- Prime Minister: John Diefenbaker
- Preceded by: Davie Fulton (acting)
- Succeeded by: Dick Bell

Secretary of State for Canada
- In office June 21, 1957 – May 11, 1958
- Prime Minister: John Diefenbaker
- Preceded by: Roch Pinard
- Succeeded by: Henri Courtemanche

Member of Parliament for Hamilton West
- In office May 15, 1950 – February 6, 1963
- Preceded by: Colin W. G. Gibson
- Succeeded by: Joseph Macaluso

Personal details
- Born: Ellen Louks Cook; January 28, 1905 Hamilton, Ontario, Canada
- Died: November 13, 2004 (aged 99) Dundas, Ontario, Canada
- Party: Progressive Conservative
- Spouse: Gordon Fairclough (m. 1931; died 1997)
- Children: 1
- Profession: Accountant

Ellen Louks Fairclough PC CC OOnt (née Cook; January 28, 1905 – November 13, 2004) was a Canadian politician. A Progressive Conservative member of the House of Commons of Canada from 1950 to 1963, she was the first woman ever to serve in the Canadian Cabinet.

== Early life and career ==
Fairclough was born Ellen Louks Cook on January 28, 1905, in Hamilton, Ontario, to Norman Ellsworth and Nellie Bell (née Loucks) Cook. Fairclough was a chartered accountant by training, and ran an accounting firm prior to entering politics. She also served as a member of the executive for the Girl Guides of Canada prior to her election as a Member of Parliament.

== Political career ==
Fairclough's political career began as a member of Hamilton City Council (Ontario) from 1945 to 1950. Fairclough first ran for federal office as a Progressive Conservative in the 1949 federal election, in which she was defeated by incumbent Liberal MP Colin Gibson in Hamilton West. When Gibson was appointed to the Supreme Court of Ontario the following year, however, Fairclough ran in and won the resulting by-election.

As a Member of Parliament, she advocated women's rights including equal pay for equal work.

When the PC Party took power as a result of the 1957 federal election, Prime Minister John Diefenbaker appointed her, on June 21, to the position of Secretary of State for Canada, and she became Canada's first female cabinet minister. In 1958, she became Minister of Citizenship and Immigration, and from 1962 until her defeat in 1963, she was Postmaster General. As Immigration Minister in 1962, Fairclough introduced new regulations that mostly eliminated racial discrimination in immigration policy. She also introduced a more liberal policy on refugees, and increased the number of immigrants allowed into Canada.

Fairclough was also named as Acting Prime Minister of Canada from February 19 to 20, 1958; she was the first woman ever given the duty.

Toward the end of her term in office, Fairclough sought an appointment to the Senate of Canada, but was not appointed.

She was defeated in the 1963 election by Liberal Joseph Macaluso.

== Life after politics ==
Fairclough was defeated in her bid for re-election in the 1963 election. She subsequently worked for the Hamilton Trust and Savings Corporation as a senior executive, as well as being chairperson of Hamilton Hydro.

In 1979, she was named an Officer of the Order of Canada, and was promoted to Companion in 1994. In 1989, she was the recipient of the Governor General's Award in Commemoration of the Person's Case. In the fall of 1996, she received the Order of Ontario, the highest honour awarded by the province.

Fairclough was active in the Consumers Association of Canada, the Girl Guides, the I.O.D.E., the Y.W.C.A., the United Empire Loyalist Association, and the Zonta Club of Hamilton and Zonta International, before, during and after her stay in office. In 1982, the Ontario government office tower on the corner of MacNab and King Streets in Hamilton was officially named the Ellen Fairclough Building.

In recognition of her status as a pioneering woman in Canadian politics, she was bestowed the title Right Honourable in 1992 by Queen Elizabeth II, one of very few Canadians to have the title who had not been Prime Minister, Governor General or Chief Justice.

At the Progressive Conservative leadership election, 1993, Fairclough was a supporter of Kim Campbell, and gave the speech to formally nominate Campbell on the convention floor.

In 1995, she published her memoirs, Saturday's Child: Memoirs of Canada's First Female Cabinet Minister.

She died at St. Joseph's Villa, a nursing home in Dundas, Ontario, on November 13, 2004. She was 99. Her husband Gordon and son Howard both predeceased her.

On June 21, 2005, Canada Post issued a postage stamp in honour of Fairclough.

== Archives ==
The Ellen Louks Fairclough fonds is at Library and Archives Canada.
