= Stanley Hudecki =

Canadian politician (1916–1988)

Stanley M. Hudecki (April 22, 1916 – June 26, 1988) was a Canadian surgeon and politician. Hudecki was Member of Parliament for the riding of Hamilton West from 1980 until 1984. He was a member of the Liberal Party of Canada.

== Personal life ==
Stanley Michael Hudecki was an orthopedic surgeon by profession. He was the second eldest son of Michael and Mary (Marcisz) Hudecki who arrived in Canada in the early 1900s. The family was composed of three boys and one girl, Leon, Stanley, Stephen and Helen. They lived in Hamilton, Ontario, where father Michael worked at Dominion Glass Works and was also one of the other Polish immigrant men who began the construction of the original Polish-Canadian St. Stanislaus Catholic Church. Mother Mary was a homemaker who delighted in her family and her church.

== Medical career ==
Hudecki went to the University of Toronto and graduated with his M.D. degree in 1940. He was a Captain in the Royal Canadian Armed Forces throughout the war years and served as a general practitioner for the troops. After the war, he met and married Mary Leona Johnson, R.N., of Brantford, with whom he had nine children. During this time, he continued his training as a general surgeon (F.R.C.S.(C.)1950)in Toronto and received his orthopaedic specialist degree in 1960.

He maintained his diagnostic and surgical practice in Hamilton, with privileges at St. Joseph's Hospital, where he served as Chief of Orthopaedic Surgery for many years, at the Henderson, at the General and was an associate professor of Orthopaedics at McMaster University. Very involved in the care of disabled children at the Chedoke Crippled Children's Centre, he championed their cause in many situations. He was also active in the Rygiel Home for children and was one of the founding members of Participation House which assists and provides accommodations for young disabled adults to live independently.

== Local civic affairs ==
Hudecki and his wife and children were parishioners of St. Joseph's Church in Hamilton's West end. He participated, in many associations such as the Thistle Club, Medical Legal Club, the Hamilton Academy of Medicine, the Neuman Club and the Sierra Club, to name a few.

== Parliamentary career ==
A dynamic member of the local Liberal Party, he was persuaded to run as a candidate for the party when the highly respected member of Parliament for Hamilton West, Lincoln Alexander stepped down in 1980. Hudecki was elected as a member of Parliament in the 1980 Canadian federal election.

During his term, served as Parliamentary Secretary to the Minister of National Defence. In 1985, he announced the Canadian government's policy to increase its presence in Central America.

== Loss of seat ==
His seat was lost to Peter Peterson of the Progressive Conservative Party of Canada in the great Mulroney Tory sweep of the 1984 federal election.

Parliament of Canada
Preceded by Lincoln Alexander	Member for Hamilton West; 1980–1984	Succeeded by Peter Peterson
