= Parlor, Bedroom and Bath (1920 film) =

1920 film

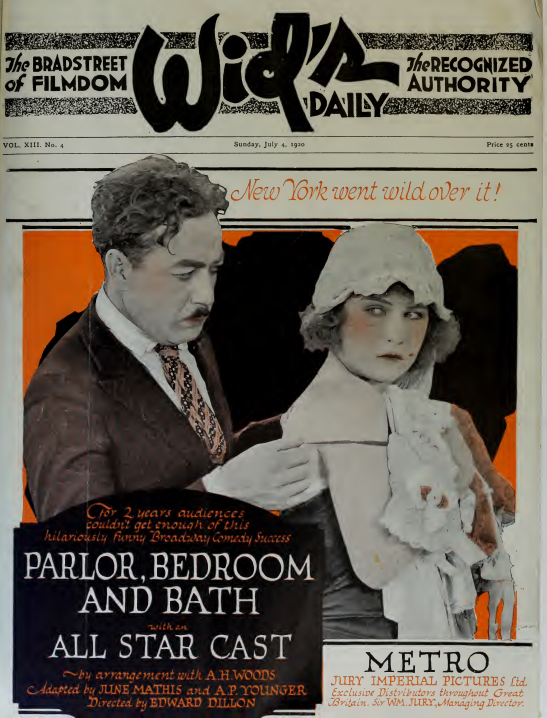
- Advertisement
- Directed by: Edward Dillon
- Written by: Charles William Bell (play); Mark Swan (play)
- Produced by: Richard A. Rowland ?Louis B. Mayer; A. H. Woods ("by arrangement with")
- Starring: Ruth Stonehouse; Eugene Pallette; Kathleen Kirkham
- Cinematography: William M. Edmond
- Distributed by: Metro Pictures
- Release date: July 5, 1920
- Running time: 6 reels
- Country: United States
- Language: Silent (English intertitles)

Parlor, Bedroom and Bath is a lost 1920 American silent comedy film produced and released by Metro Pictures and directed by Edward Dillon. The film stars Ruth Stonehouse and Eugene Pallette.

It is based on the 1917 Broadway play Parlor, Bedroom and Bath by Charles William Bell and Mark Swan which was produced by A. H. Woods.

The play was filmed again as Parlor, Bedroom and Bath at MGM in 1931 with Buster Keaton and Charlotte Greenwood.

== Cast ==
- Eugene Pallette as Reggie Irving
- Ruth Stonehouse as Polly Hathaway
- Kathleen Kirkham as Angelica Irving
- Charles H. West as Jeffrey Haywood
- Dorothy Wallace as Virginia Irving
- Helen Sullivan as Leila
- Henry Miller, Jr. as Ferdie Eaton
- George Periolat as Fred Leslie
- Josephine Hill as Nita Leslie
- Graham Pettie as Barkis
