= Parlor, Bedroom and Bath (1931 film) =

1931 film directed by Edward Sedgwick

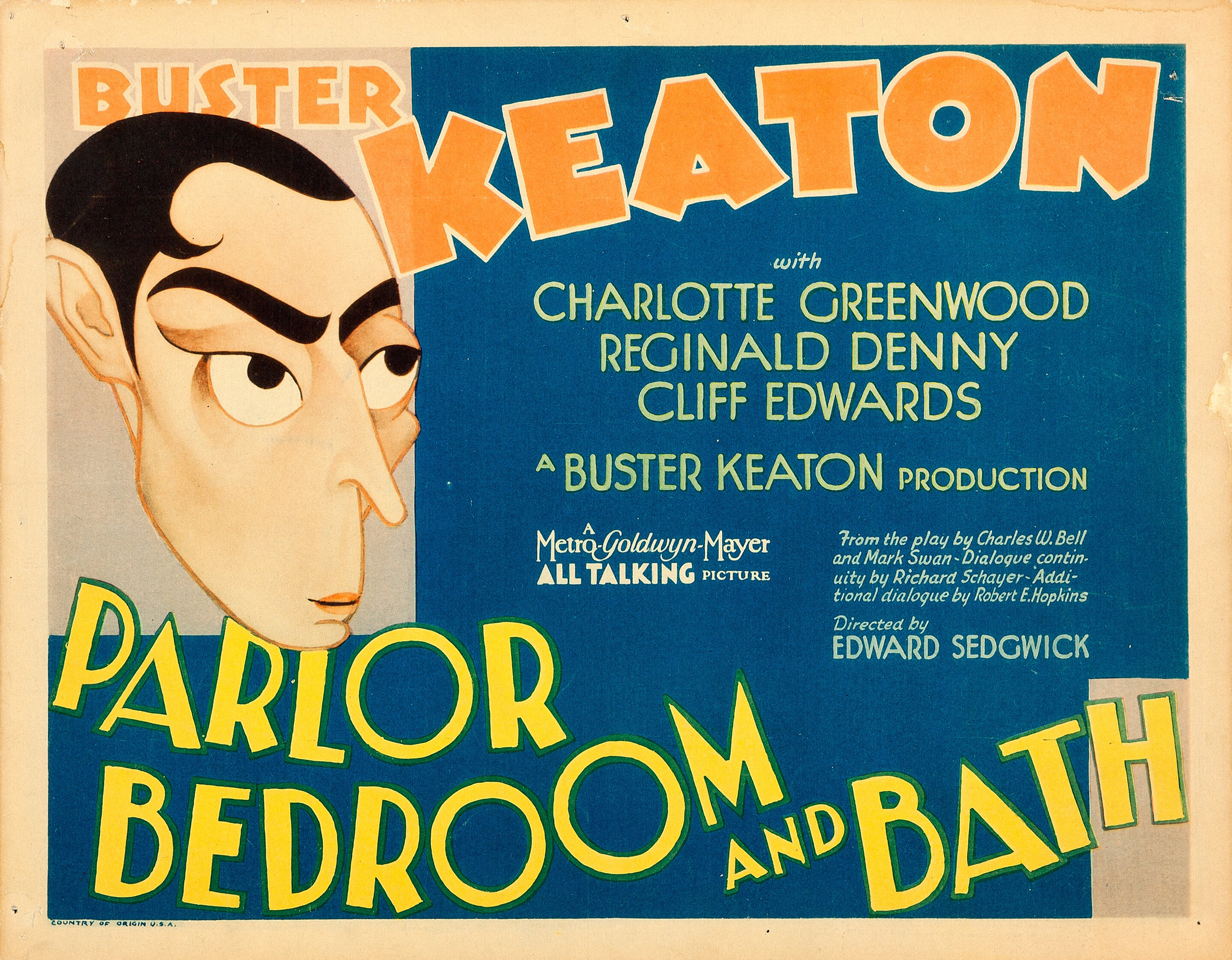
- 1931 Lobby card
- Directed by: Edward Sedgwick
- Written by: Charles William Bell (play); Mark Swan (play)
- Produced by: Buster Keaton
- Starring: Buster Keaton; Charlotte Greenwood
- Cinematography: Leonard Smith
- Edited by: William LeVanway
- Distributed by: Metro-Goldwyn Mayer
- Release date: February 28, 1931
- Running time: 73 minutes
- Country: United States
- Language: English

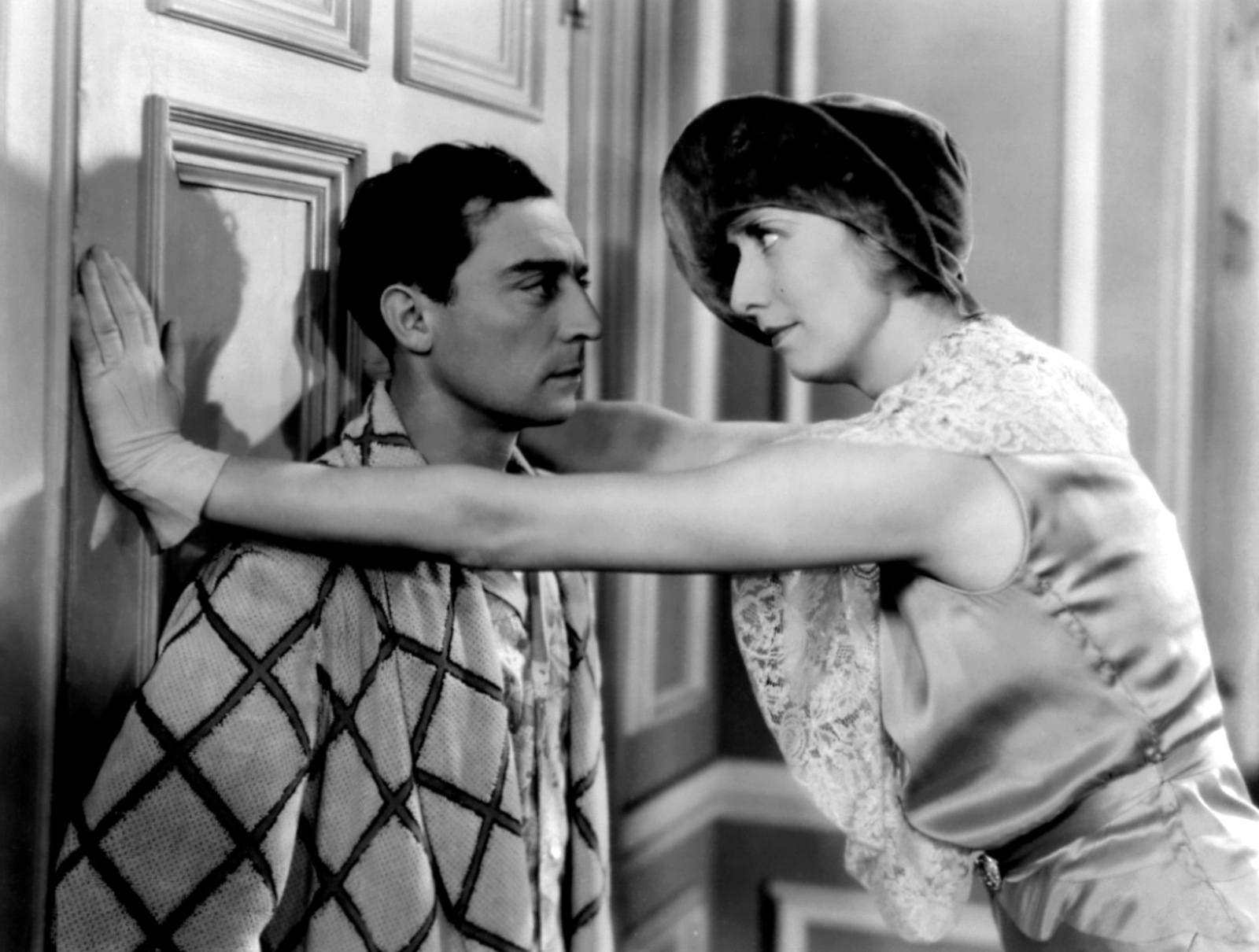
Buster Keaton and Charlotte Greenwood

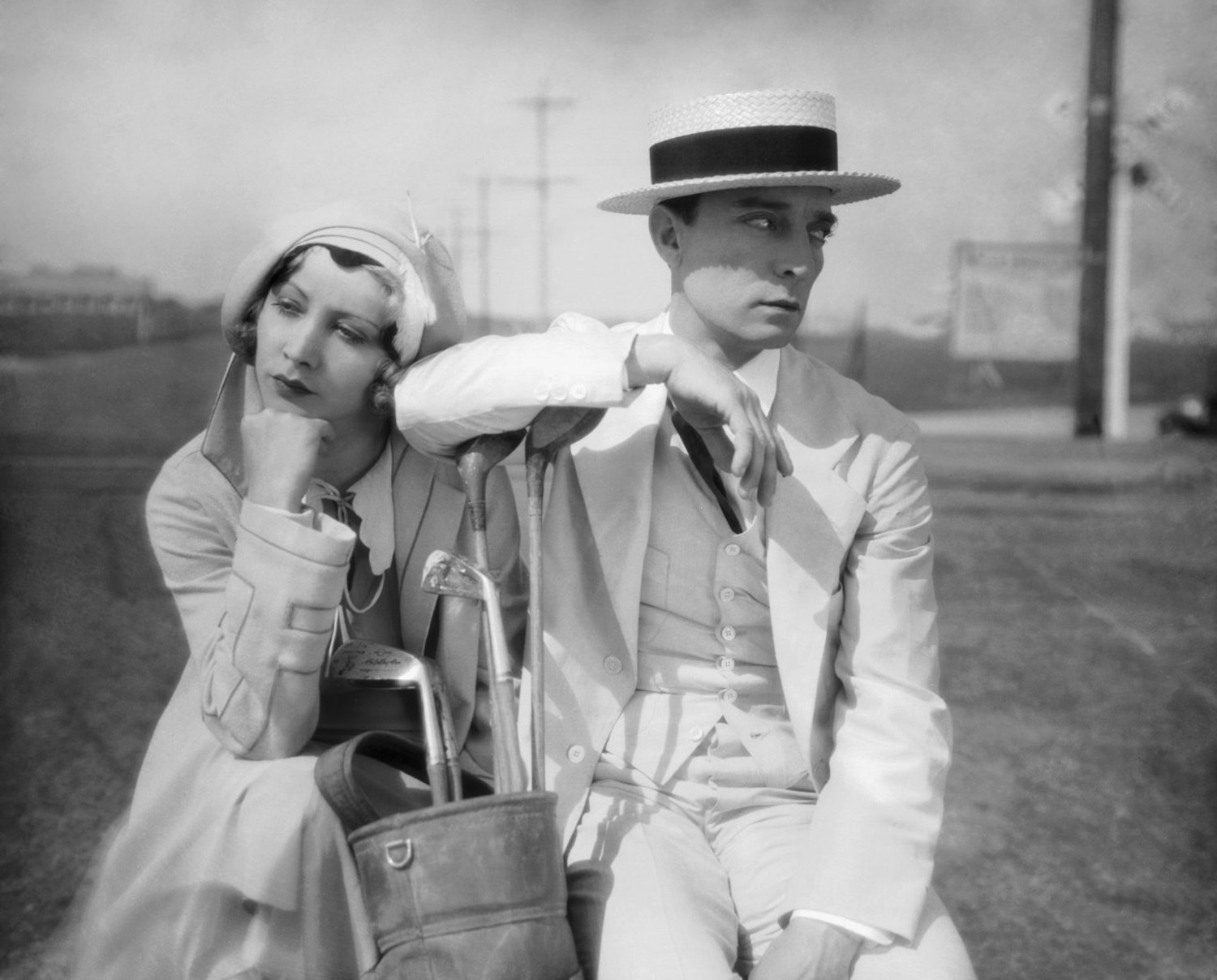
Joan Peers and Buster Keaton

Parlor, Bedroom and Bath

Parlor, Bedroom and Bath is an American pre-Code comedy film starring Buster Keaton, released by Metro-Goldwyn Mayer in 1931. It was Keaton's third talking picture after his successful silent career.

The film was released in the United Kingdom as Romeo in Pyjamas. Two foreign-language versions were made at the same time: Buster se marie in French, and Casanova wider Willen in German.

It is the remake of a 1920 film of the same name, based on the play by Charles William Bell and Mark Swan, which opened on Broadway in New York City on Christmas Eve, 1917 and ran for 232 performances.

Parlor, Bedroom and Bath was filmed partly at Keaton's own house. The film is in the public domain due to the copyright not being renewed.

== Plot ==
Jeffrey Haywood wants to marry Virginia "Ginny" Embrey. However, Ginny refuses to marry unless her older sister, the hard-to-please Angelica marries first as she's afraid that Angelica will become an old maid. Angelica, in turn, finds every man she knows too dull and predictable, not wild and exciting, so prefers to stay single.

One day, Jeff hits mild-mannered and timid Reggie Irving with his car and brings him to the Embrey mansion to recuperate. Angelica thinks that Reggie's handsome, so Jeff lies, telling her that he's a notorious, wealthy playboy chased away from Europe's playgrounds. Angelica's intrigued, particularly when different women, hired by Jeff, visit Reggie and fight over him.

Reggie's alarmed by this turn of events, as he thinks that Angelica's beautiful, but is inexperienced with wooing women. He tries to flee, but is captured and re-concussed by the Embrey groundskeepers at Jeff's direction. Angelica continues nursing him, falling in love.

Worried that Angelica will find Reggie dull, Jeff asks Polly, a society journalist, to write rumors about him. Also, he reserves a room for Polly and Reggie at the Seaside Hotel, intending that she'll will teach him how to woo and Angelica will catch them together, proving that Reggie's not dull. Nita Leslie, a family friend, believes the rumors Polly's been writing and, furious that her husband Fred prioritizes work over their marriage, declares to the Embreys that she'll go to an hotel "with the worst man I know." She sees Reggie packing his car and drives away with him.

After a disastrous trip to the Seaside Hotel, Nita and Reggie check in to their suite as Mr. and Mrs. John Smith. Nita becomes frightened that she is at an hotel with a terrible man and hides in the bedroom, despite his pleading from the parlor that Angelica needs to catch them together. Then, Polly bursts into the suite and comically attempts to teach him to woo. Sadly, Reggie's a limp fish, lacking passion.

The Embreys and Fred arrive, Fred shooting at Reggie for running away with Nita. Polly collapses, and everyone flees, shouting, "Murder!" with Fred pulling Nita out of the room before locking Reggie in the parlor with the "body." He hides her in a closet before the police arrive. When they find her, Polly wakes from her faint, and Reggie escapes. Everyone runs around the hotel, becoming mixed up, and Reggie and Angelica end back in his hotel suite together. He kisses her passionately, and she melts into his arms.

== Cast ==
- Buster Keaton as Reginald Irving
- Charlotte Greenwood as Polly Hathaway
- Reginald Denny as Jeffrey Haywood
- Cliff Edwards as Bell Hop
- Dorothy Christy as Angelica Embrey
- Joan Peers as Nita Leslie
- Sally Eilers as Virginia Embrey
- Natalie Moorhead as Leila Crofton
- Edward Brophy as Detective
- Sidney Bracey as Butler
- Walter Merrill as Fredrick Leslie

== See also ==
- List of films in the public domain
