= Wentworth Street =

Lower City arterial road in Hamilton, Ontario, Canada

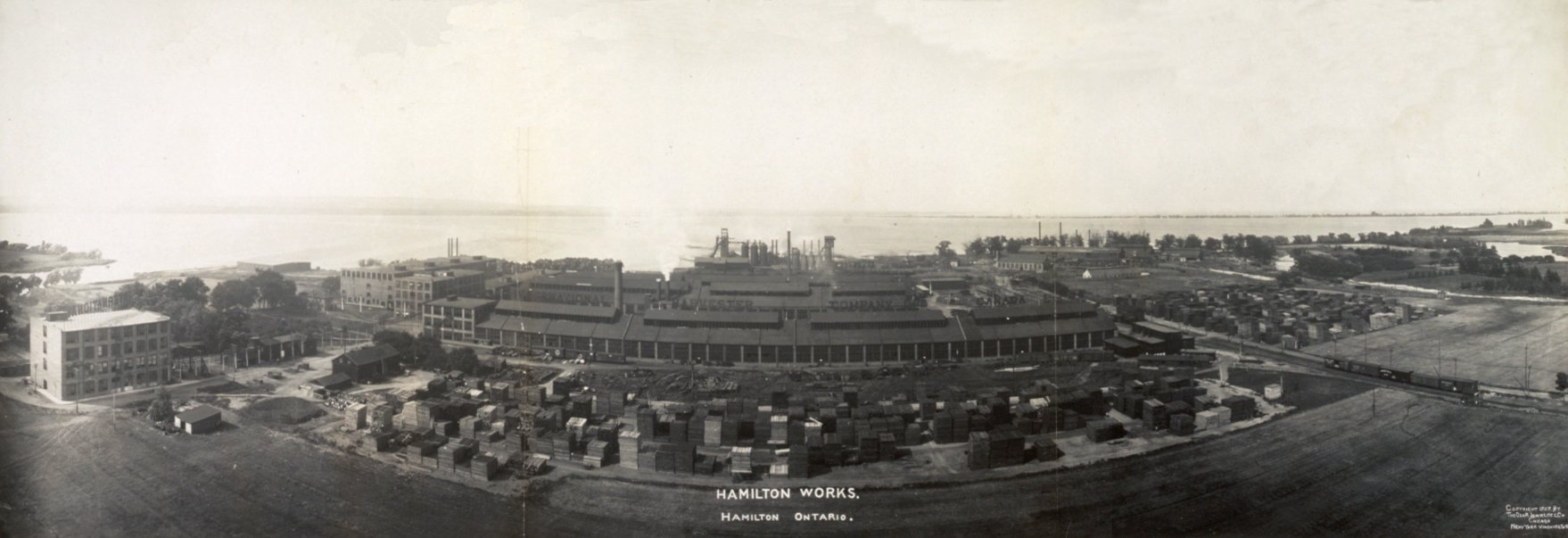
International Harvester Company plant and waterfront in Hamilton circa 1907

Wentworth Street is a Lower City arterial road in Hamilton, Ontario, Canada. It starts off at the base of the Niagara Escarpment (mountain) on Charlton Avenue East just south of the CP lines and runs right through the city's North End industrial neighbourhood and ends north of Burlington Street East at Pier 14, which one time was used by International Harvester (1902–1992).

From 1971 to 2016 it was a one-way street southbound-only from just north of Delaware Avenue to Barton Street East. It was decided to revert it back to two-way traffic in an effort to make it less of a "freeway" and more pedestrian friendly.

== History ==
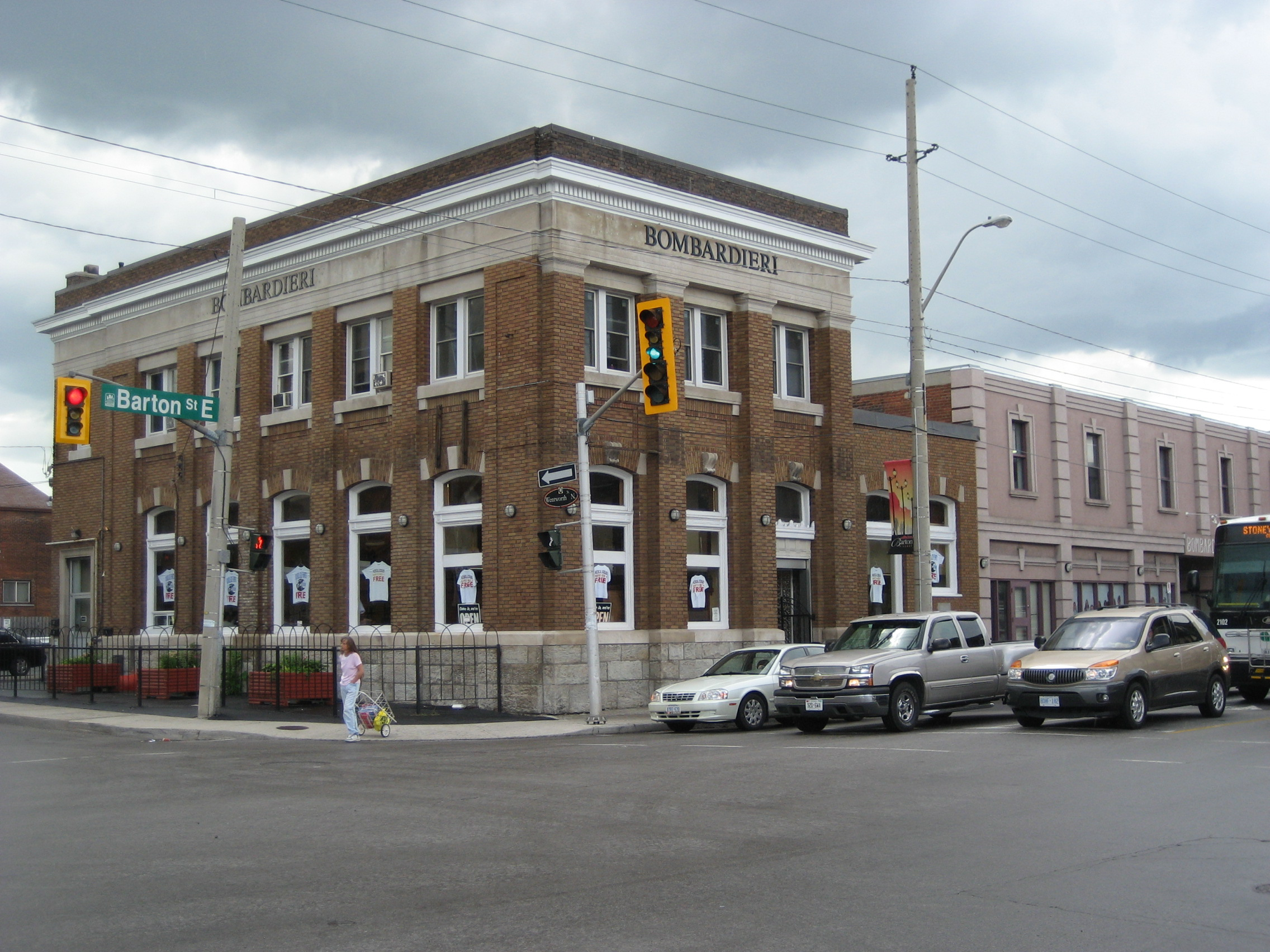
Corner of Wentworth & Barton Streets

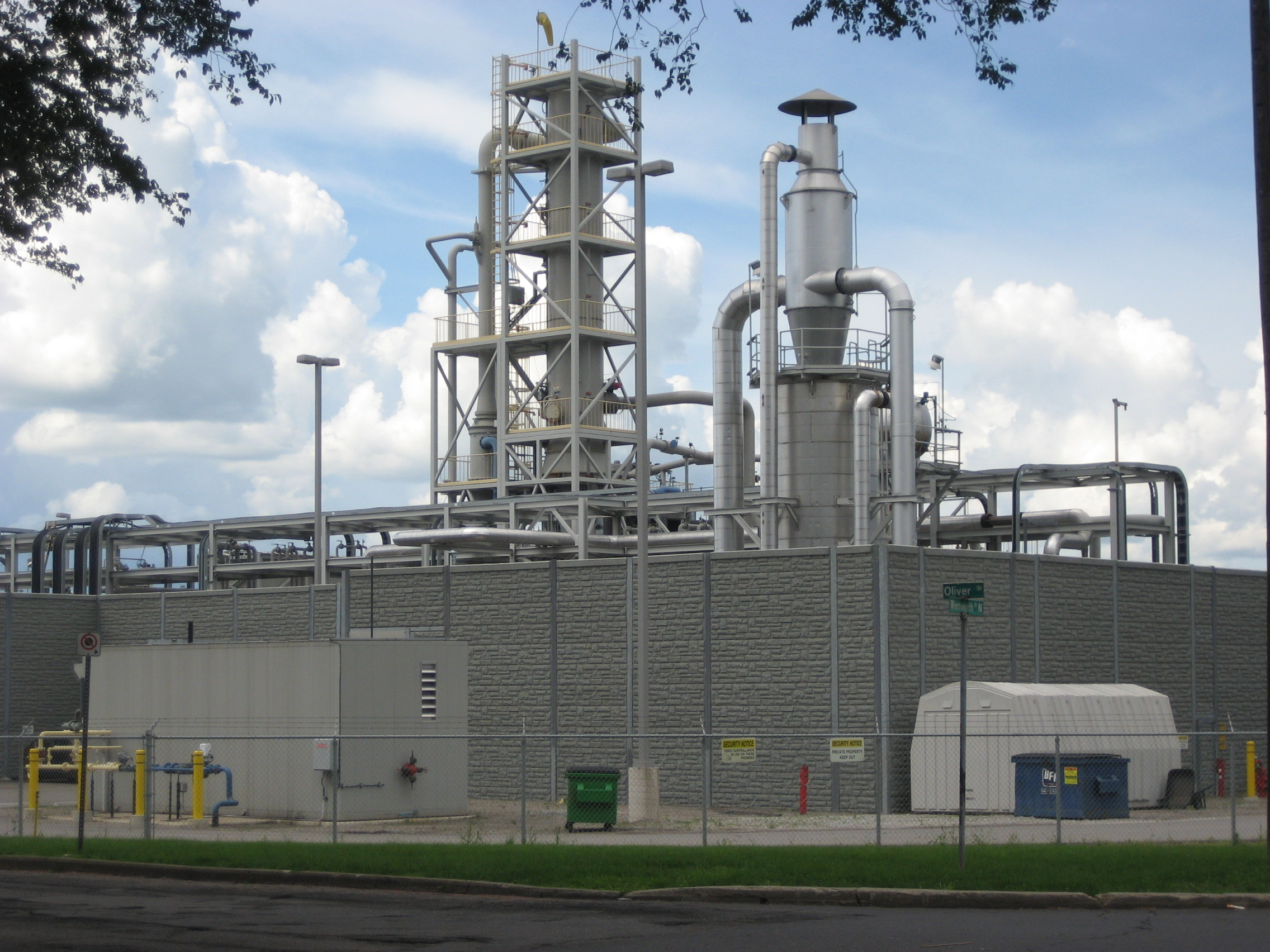
Northend, Wentworth Street

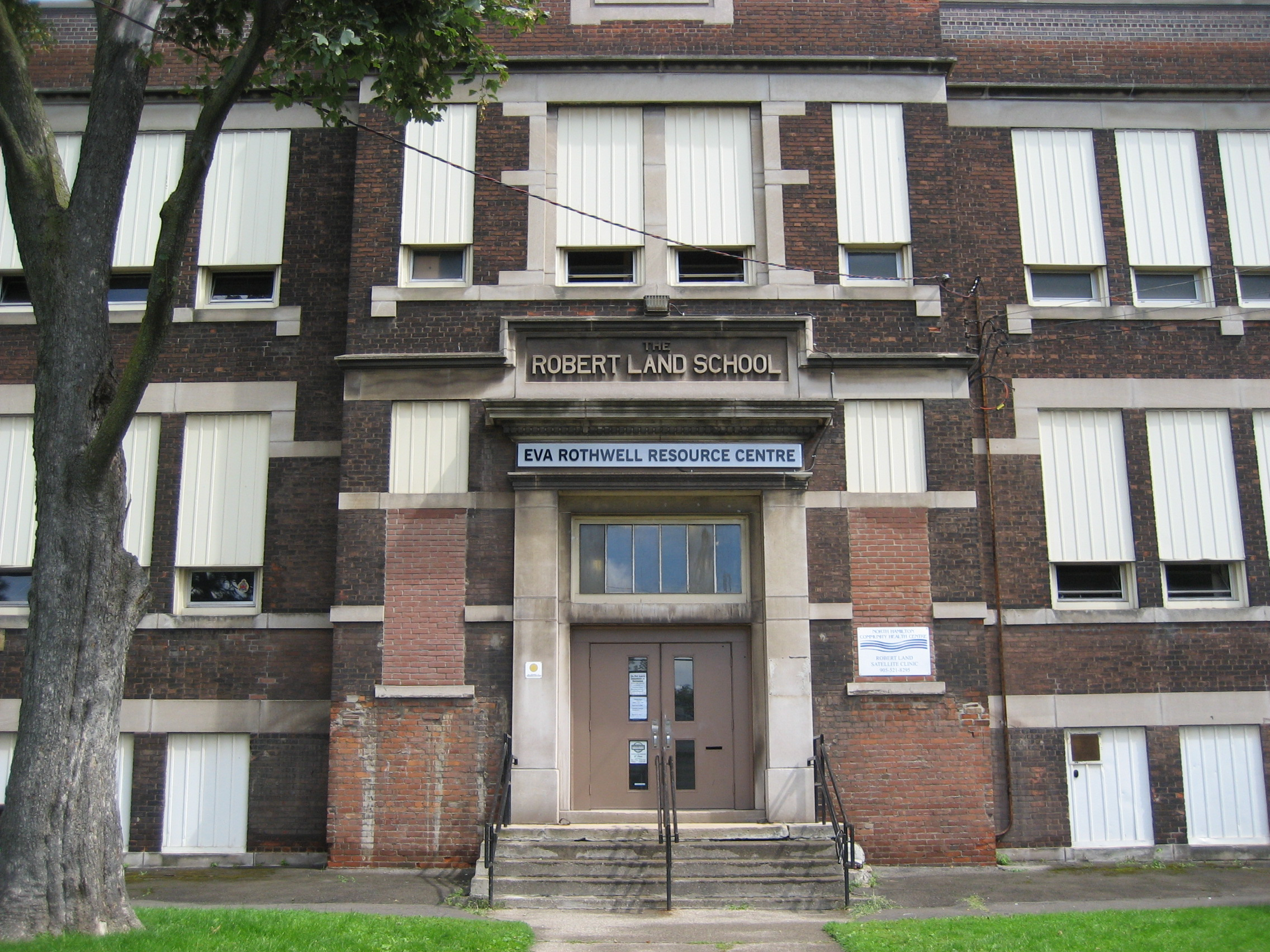
Robert Land School, building

Wentworth Street, is named after Sir John Wentworth, lieutenant-governor of Nova Scotia, from 1792 to 1808.

The first Westinghouse manufacturing operation outside of the United States was established in Hamilton, Ontario in 1897 on Sanford Avenue, one year after The Dominion Power and Transmission Company was formed in Hamilton. This marked a new industrial era for Hamilton. It was then incorporated in 1903, (1903–1997). Company founder George Westinghouse set up a factory to build air brakes for the booming rail industry. Eventually the company was producing from its Hamilton plants electric ranges, refrigerators and washing machines. During each of the wars it was also producing guns, ammunition, anti-radar devices and bomb sights. At its peak in 1955, Westinghouse employed 11,000 people in Hamilton. (second only to Stelco) Westinghouse in Hamilton was the first company in Canada to manufacture radios (1923) and electric air cleaners (1944).

International Harvester became the second major United States industry to locate in Hamilton, Ontario in 1902, (1902–1992). Originally known as Deering Harvester, the company plant sprawled along the Hamilton waterfront and claimed to be the "largest agricultural implement works in the British Empire." The plant was also involved in wartime production of specialized military items. The company started building heavy duty diesel trucks in Hamilton in 1959. The first to roll off the line was delivered to Dofasco, complete with a Rolls-Royce engine. Hamilton won over a number of Canadian cities when it successfully lured International Harvester. The reasons the company cited for its selection of Hamilton were as follows: it had waterside property that enabled the firm to control its own docks, its proximity to the steel industry, railway connections & the Cataract Power Company supplied them with cheap energy.

In 1922, the Beech-Nut Packing Company (makers of the Life Savers candy), establishes Canadian operations in Hamilton on Cumberland Avenue near Sanford Avenue at the base of the Niagara Escarpment. It was reported that when the company first started producing candy it was so pleased with the treatment from the city that it distributed free boxes of gum on the street and to every retailer in the city. By 1969 the company was producing more than a billion lifesavers candies a year in 26 flavours.

A number of recording studios call Hamilton home. In 1985, Daniel Lanois opened up Grant Avenue Studios a landmark in Hamilton, on 38 Grant Avenue, one block west of Wentworth Street South. A solo artist in his own right he's made his mark as a producer for some of the world's biggest musical acts. Some of these include Bob Dylan, Peter Gabriel and U2.

In 2006, the Disney film Firehouse Dog was filmed at the old Westinghouse headquarters building (1903–1997), on Wentworth Street North, (entrance one block east on Sanford Avenue) which featured the firehouse dog jumping off the roof of the burning building.

The site of the Cathedral Secondary School is the original site of the Hamilton Street Railway Company which maintained its operations at this site from 1910-1999. HSR was incorporated in 1873.

=== Eastend Incline Railway ===
Wentworth Street, at the base of the Niagara Escarpment (mountain) was the site of the city's second incline railway (1895–1936). Back then, the incline railway on Wentworth Street was known as the Eastend Incline Railway but was often called, The Mount Hamilton Incline Railway. The city's first incline railway on James Street South, (1892–1932), was known as the Hamilton & Barton Incline Railway. The first day, the public was allowed free access up and down the line. By the time the Wentworth Street incline made its last trip on 16 August 1936, it was estimated that nearly 20,000,000 trips had been made up and down the line. The Eastend Incline on Wentworth Street was electrically operated and the Westend Incline on James Street depended on steam for its power.

In 1929, the city's brochures were using the motto, "The City Beautiful and Hub of Canadian Highways" as well as "The City of Opportunity". In regards to the incline railways, the brochures go on to boast, "There is no finer view anywhere on the North American continent than the panorama to be seen from the Hamilton mountain. The city below, the blue waters of Hamilton harbour and Lake Ontario. In the background, flanked on the east by the famous Niagara Fruit District and on the west by the beautiful Dundas Valley and a range of hills, combine to make a picture no artist could paint. There are several roads leading up to the summit and you can drive upon "high", but if you want to enjoy a unique experience and give the family a thrill, drive your car onto one of the Incline Railways and you will have something to tell the folks about when you go back home."

In 1914, the city leaders of the day seriously looked at the possibility of extending the Wentworth Street mountain incline tracks to a point far enough north to eliminate the heavy climb. Their plan was to have the incline tracks pass under the Toronto, Hamilton and Buffalo Railway (T.H. & B.) tracks and over the Grand Trunk Railway (GTR) tracks on a level crossing. That never came about. City businessman George Webb offered to finance the whole scheme himself on the condition that the city of Hamilton undertook construction a permanent roadway on Wentworth Street. In 1915, George Webb had to defend himself when the public asked 'why the Wentworth Street incline costs more to use compared to the James Street incline?' At the time it was costing 15 cents per one hundred school kids on the James Street incline compared to 50 cents per one hundred school kids on his Wentworth Street incline. His defence was that school kids could use his incline on Wentworth any time of the day whereas on the James Street incline school kids were only allowed to be carried on school days between the morning hours of 8 to 9 and the afternoon hours of 12 noon to 2 and 4 to 5.

In 1924, following the city's booming development in the east, there was some serious discussion regarding the addition of a third incline railway. The 2 locations be considered at the time were Sherman Avenue or Ottawa Street South. The population of Hamilton Mountain at the time was 6,000.

In 1949 there was a petition going around town to help revive the Eastend incline, with no success. It was estimated that year 2,000 people used the Wentworth mountain stairs on a daily basis between the hours of 6 in the morning and 6 pm. Proponents of the incline argued that an elevator 'would take passengers and baby carriages to the top of Hamilton mountain and back' plus 'school children took the bus because they couldn't carry their bicycles up the steps'. The reason attributed for its closure in 1936 was the falling off in the numbers using it, due to the depression, and the depreciation of its rolling stock.

== Bruce Trail ==
One can reach the Bruce Trail on Wentworth Street South via the Wentworth Street Stairway. The trail cuts through the city along the Niagara Escarpment (mountain) and is used by many locals for a full day's hike. The trail is 430 miles long and starts at Niagara Falls, passes through Hamilton and ends at the Bruce Peninsula. Hikers are led to scenic gorges, hidden waterfalls and places of quiet charm.

== Landmarks ==
Note: Listing of Landmarks from North to South.

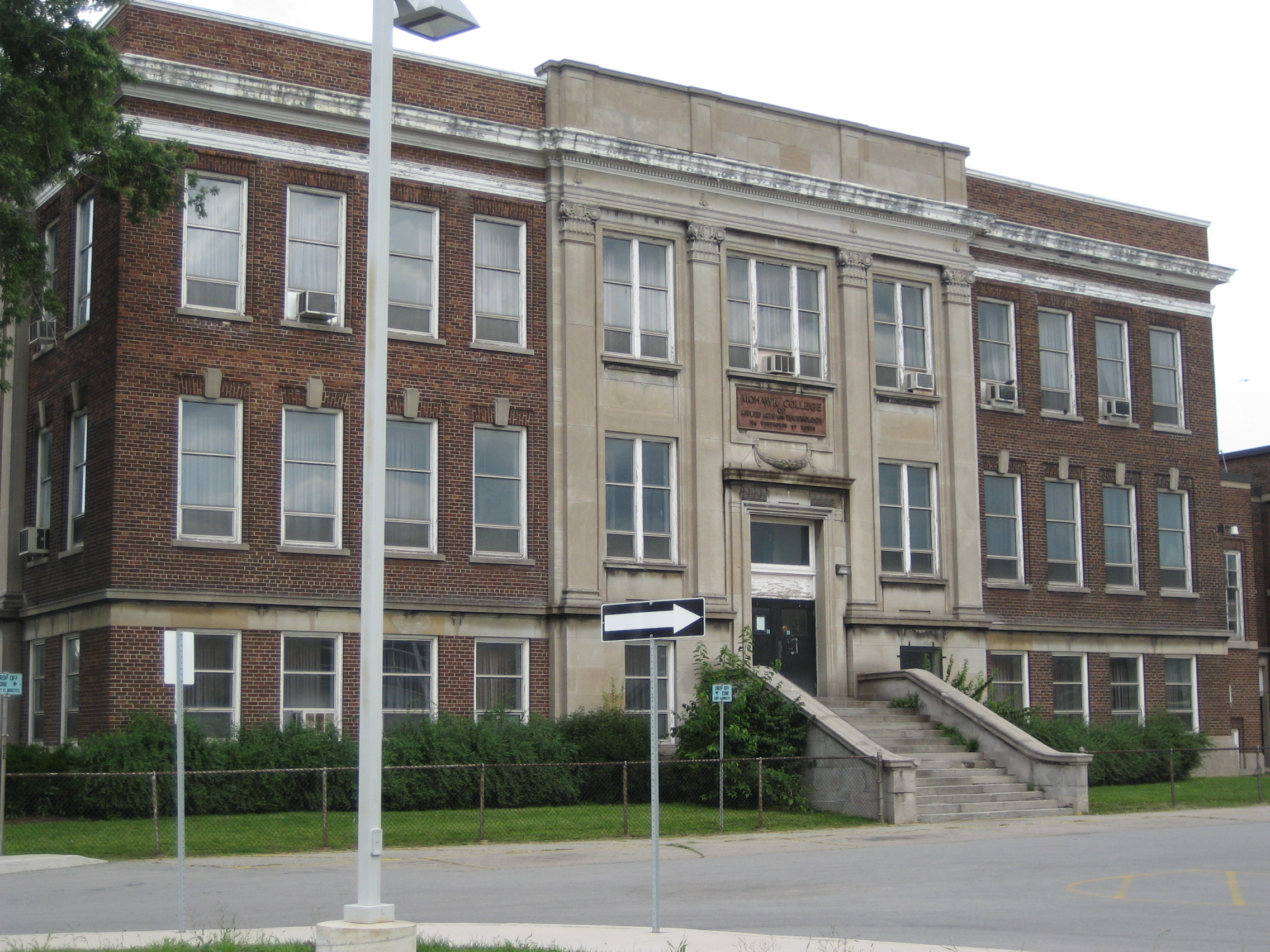
Mohawk College, Wentworth building

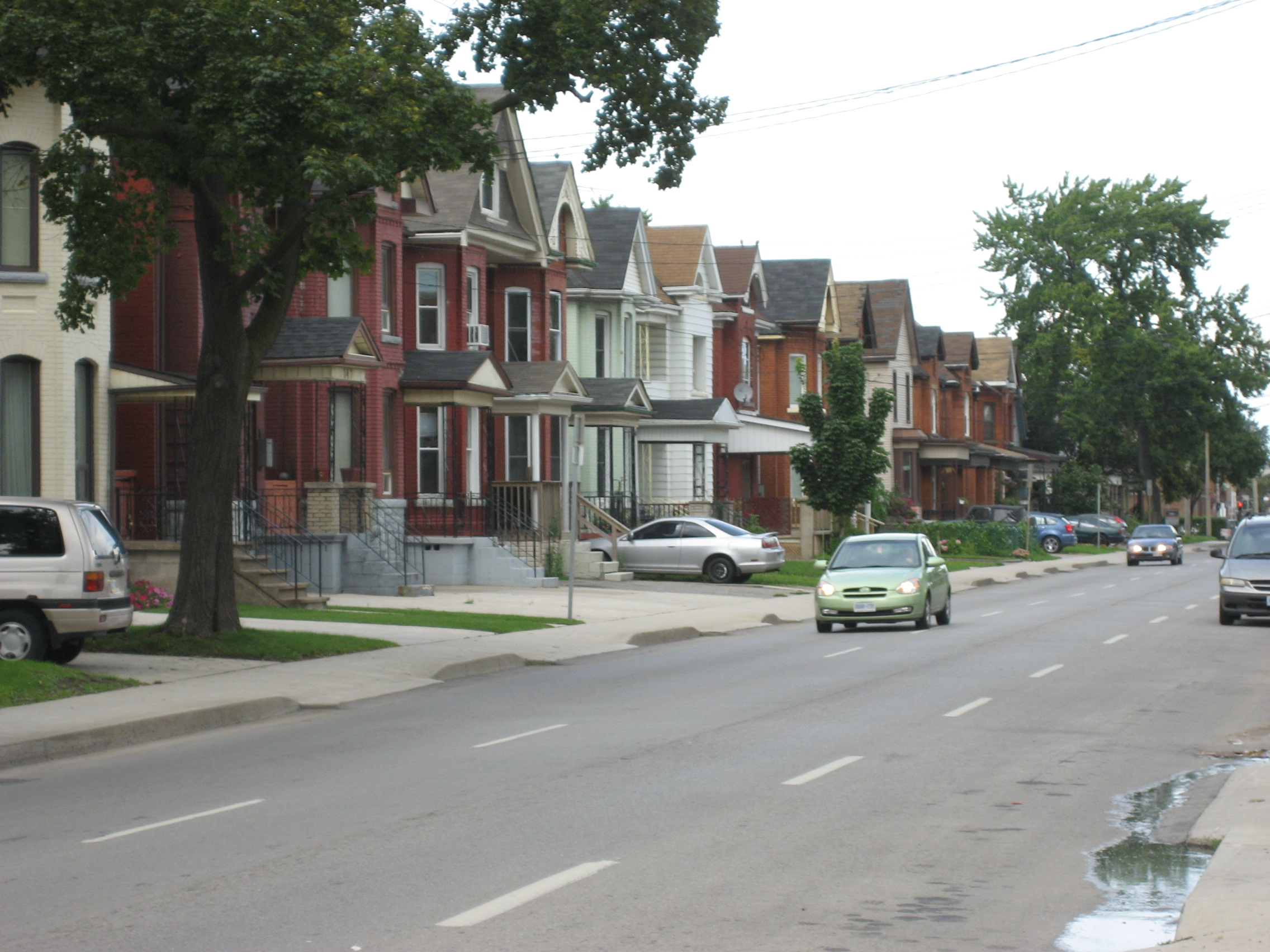
Wentworth Street North

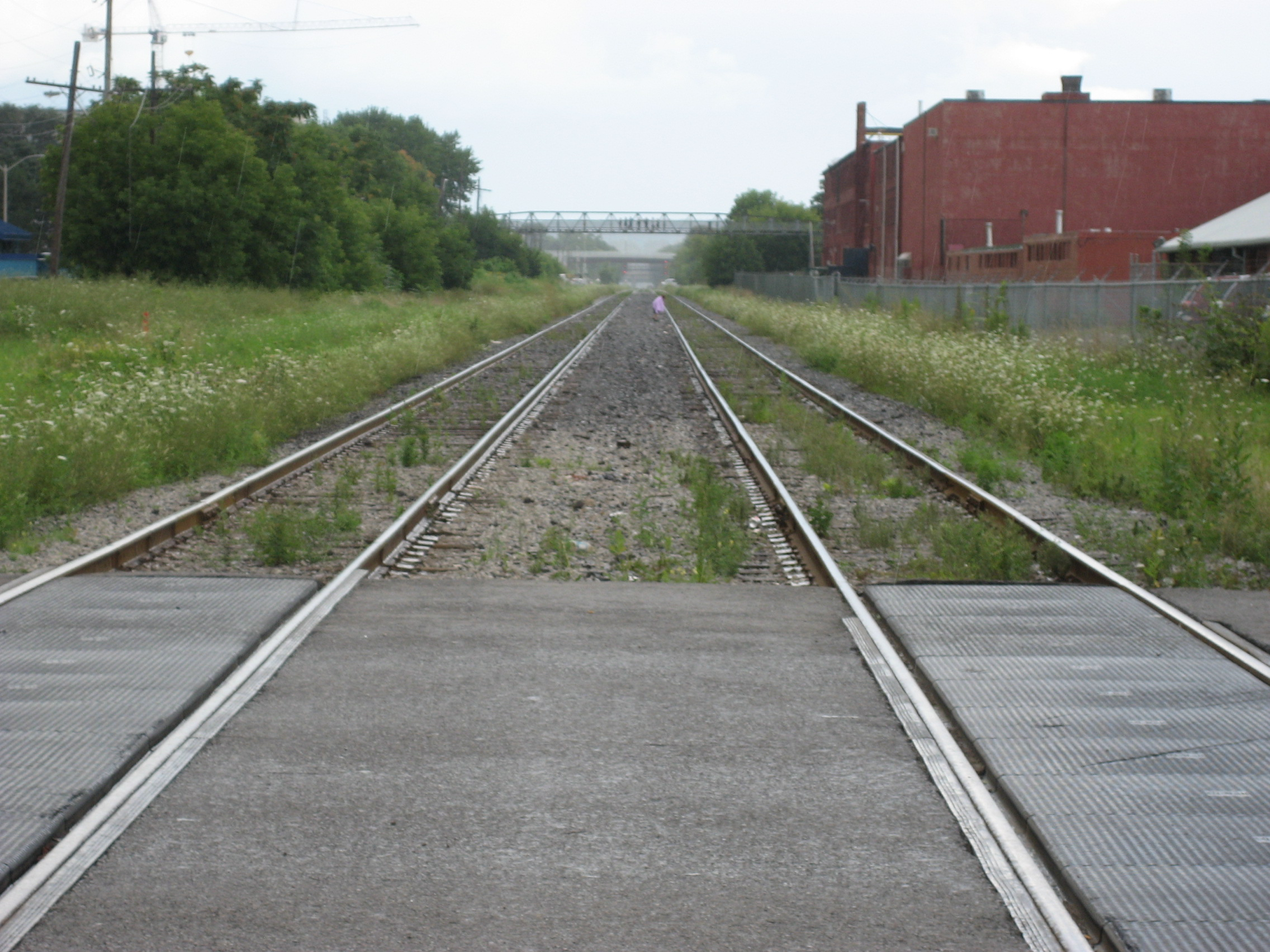
CN Railway tracks

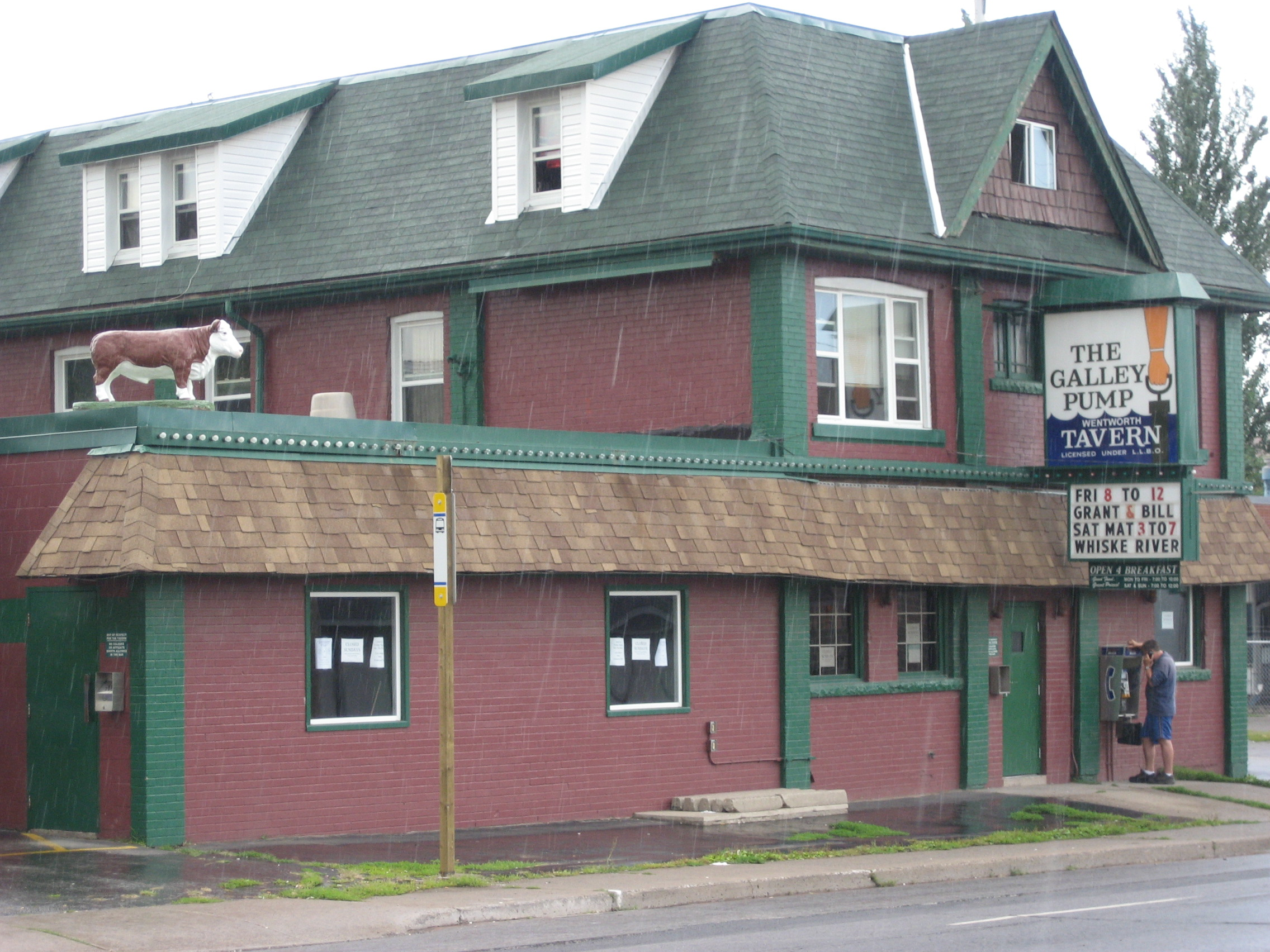
Galley Pump/ Wentworth Tavern

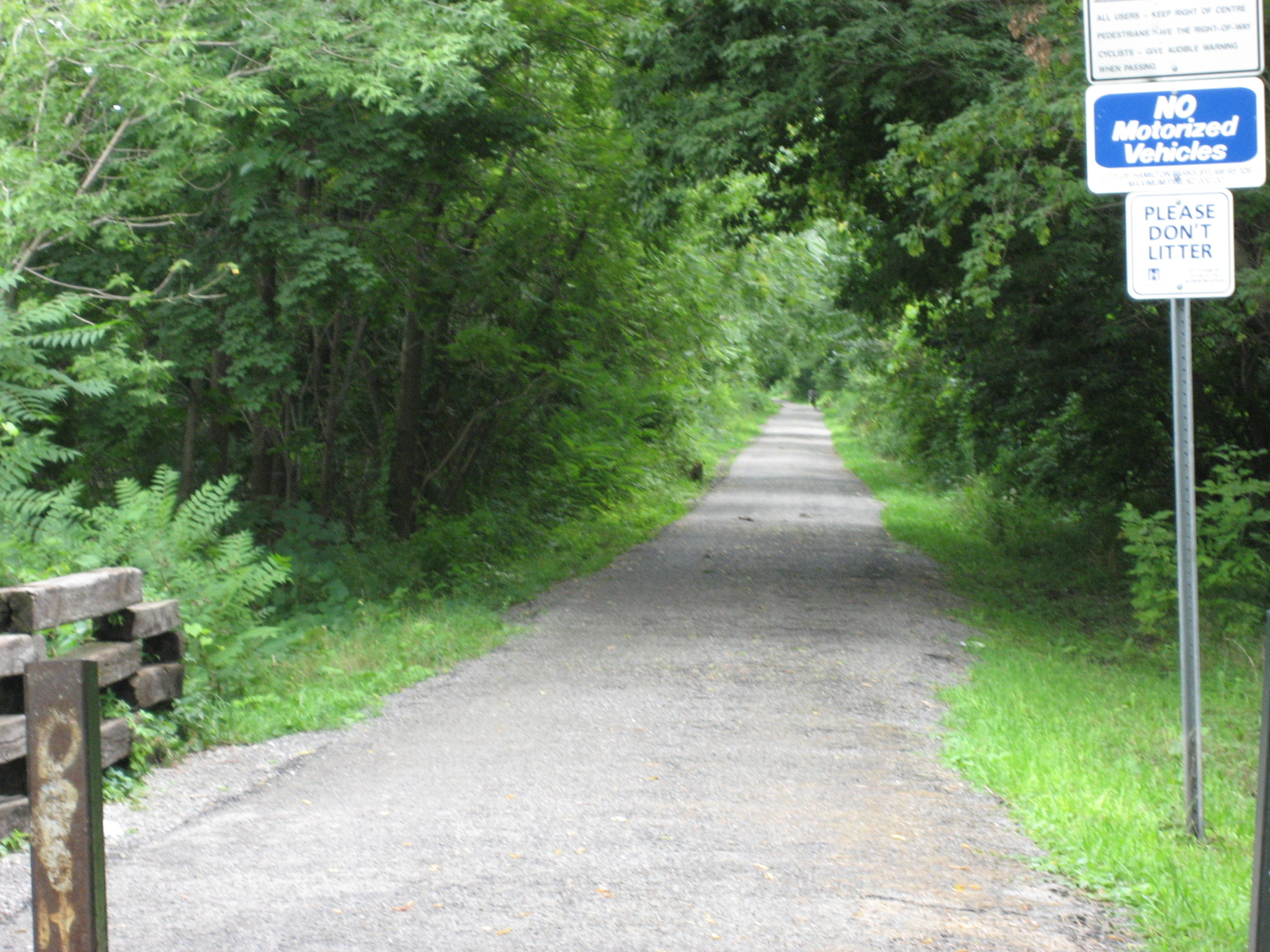
Escarpment Rail Trail

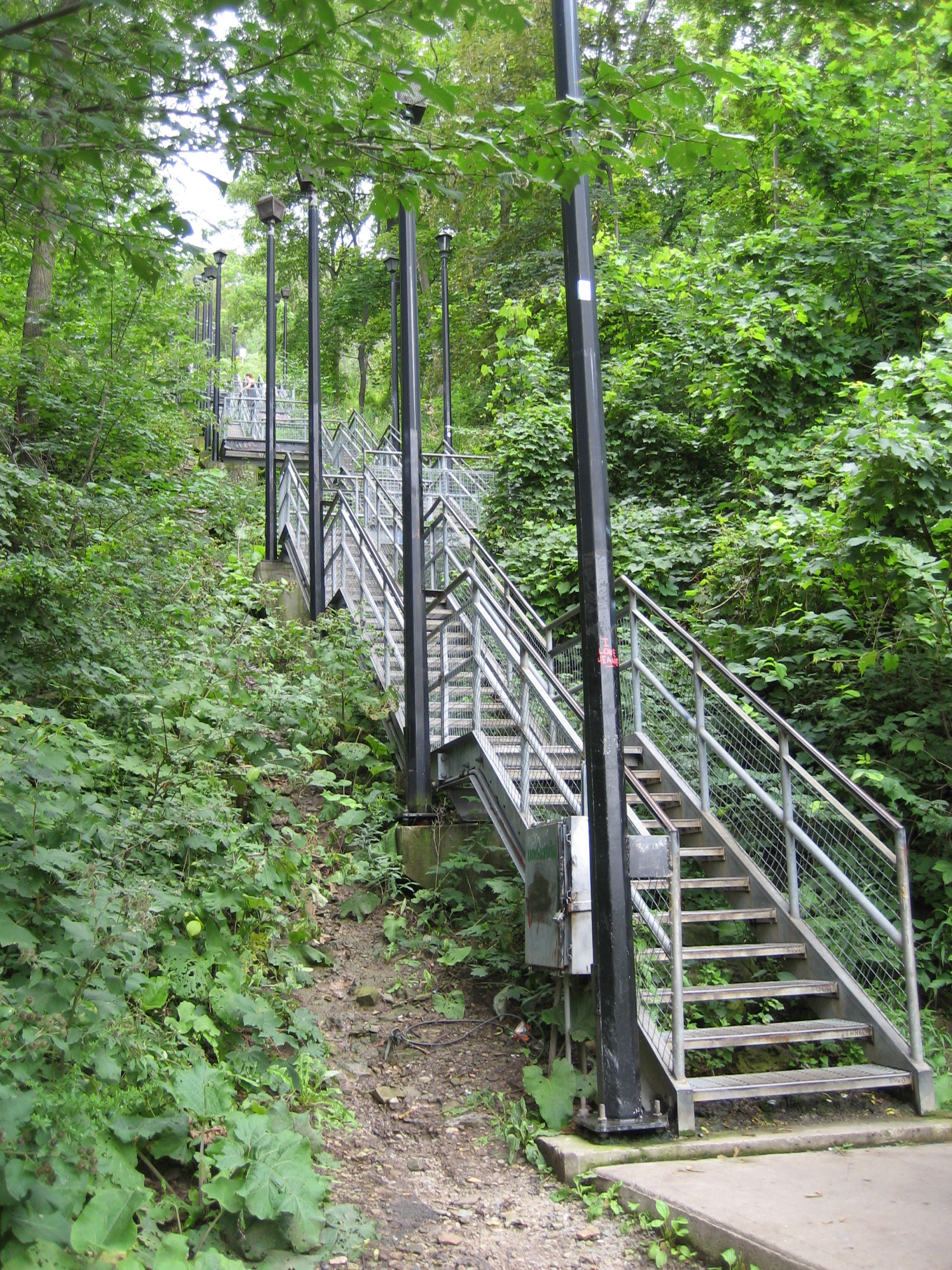
Wentworth mountain-access stairway

- Pier 14, Originally used by International Harvester (1902–1992), Piers 14, 15, 16 (Wentworth Street North to Sherman Avenue North)
- Canadian National railway tracks
- Wentworth Metal Recycling & Disposal Service
- St. David's Presbyterian Church
- Robert Land Junior Public School
- North Central CC Park
- The Galley Pump/ Wentworth Tavern
- SIEMENS building
- Canadian Westinghouse headquarters building (1903–1997), entrance one block east on Sanford Avenue.
- Woodlands Park
- Mohawk College, Wentworth campus building. (Now site of City of Hamilton Social & Public Health Services Dept.)
- Norman Pinky Lewis Recreation Centre
- Wentworth Baptist Church
- Hamilton Fire Station #6 (246 Wentworth Street North)
- site of the old Barton Street Arena, on Barton Street East and Wentworth Street North, site now occupied by a row of houses.
- Cathedral Secondary School
- Cathy Wever Elementary School (2006)
- Grant Avenue Studios, one block West of Wentworth Street South on 38 Grant Avenue.
- Grant Tower (9-storey apartment building)
- Lifesavers Park/ Life Savers Building (candy factory), off Cumberland Avenue near Sanford Avenue
- Escarpment Rail Trail (abandoned railway path)
  - Wentworth Street Stairway, 498 steps (Access to the Upper City, "Mountain")
  - Old site of the Wentworth Street Incline railway, (1895–1936), back in the day known as the Eastend Incline Railway
- Bruce Trail
- Niagara Escarpment (mountain)

== Communities ==
Note: Listing of neighbourhoods from North to South

- Northend - Everything north of the Canadian National Railway tracks
- Landsdale/ Gibson, Wentworth Street is the division between these two neighbourhoods.
- Stinson/ St. Clair, Wentworth Street is the division between these two neighbourhoods.

== See also ==
- Niagara Escarpment Commission
