= Wendell Fields =

Canadian political activist (1957–2017)

Personal details
- Born: Wendell Hugh Fields; August 26, 1957 Windsor, Nova Scotia, Canada
- Died: March 1, 2017 (aged 59) Hamilton, Ontario, Canada
- Party: Communist Party of Canada (Marxist-Leninist)

Wendell Fields (August 26, 1957 – March 1, 2017) was a Canadian veteran anti-poverty activist in Hamilton, Ontario, Canada. He was director of Hamilton Against Poverty, and twice campaigned for the House of Commons of Canada as a candidate of the Communist Party of Canada - Marxist-Leninist (CPC-ML). He died on March 1, 2017, following a short battle with cancer.

== Activist ==
In 1984, Fields, while demonstrating in sympathy with a trust company workers' strike in Waterloo, was charged with assaulting three police officers. He counter-charged the two officers that had assaulted him. The counter-charges went to trial, and Fields (who was not one of the strikers) was asked in court to explain why he was on the picket line. He refused to answer whether or not he was a Marxist-Leninist, and he was sentenced to thirty days in jail for contempt of court. The Canadian People's Defence Committee who described him as a political prisoner retained a lawyer on his behalf. Available media reports do not indicate if the appeal was successful or if either assault charge resulted in a conviction.

Fields worked as a dishwasher, busboy and labourer, and was laid off from his job as a plastics molder in about 1990. He subsequently moved from Cambridge, Ontario to Hamilton. According to The Hamilton Spectator, Fields became a part-time student to upgrade his skills, He joined Hamilton Against Poverty (HAP), a group consisting of social assistance recipients, helpful social agencies, Single mothers and the working poor. HAP was created in 1987. Wendell worked with anti poverty activist and HAP member, Julie Gordon. Gordon and Fields spoke against the Social Assistance Reform Act and the Prevention of Unionization Act at Queen's Park when Mike Harris was Premier of Ontario. Wendell, Julie and Herb Joseph made submissions together at Queen's Park concerning the Safe Streets Act. Herb Joseph, an aboriginal human rights activist wrote about the Jay Treaty for Mayday Magazine.

Fields testified before a federal House of Commons committee in 1992 as a HAP representative, speaking in opposition to a proposed child benefits bill introduced by the government of Brian Mulroney. His position was that the bill did nothing to benefit single mothers and low-income women, and should be rewritten. He and the HAP were also involved in lobbying about issues of homelessness.

Fields was arrested in 1995 following a demonstration by McMaster University students against tuition fee hikes. The following year, he spoke out in opposition to the provincial government's workfare policies, stating that ""We must fight (workfare) with dignity, pride and fearlessness."

He was charged with trespassing in 1999, after a peaceful demonstration protesting a display of fighter aircraft and what he and other protesters described as the militarism of an airshow at Hamilton International John C. Munro Airport. He pleaded not guilty. The following year, he was charged with failing to leave a premise after joining other protesters in occupying the office of Progressive Conservative Member of Provincial Parliament (MPP) Brad Clark to oppose the policies of Clark's government.

== Candidate for office ==
Fields ran for public office until the 1997 federal election when he campaigned in Hamilton West for the CPC-ML. He also campaigned for municipal and provincial office in the late 1990s, making a bid for Mayor of Hamilton in 1997. He campaigned more local involvement in government, including people's councils, and a constituent assembly to develop appropriate government structure for the city. He also argued that the economic decisions must be made to benefit citizens rather than corporate interests. He also suggested the creation of neighbourhood groups to make surprise inspections of polluting industries. In 1999, he stood as an independent candidate for the provincial government in the riding of Hamilton West. Fields campaigned for the Canadian House of Commons a second time in the 2000 federal election for the Marxist-Leninist party. He received 61 votes. In the 2011 federal election, he also ran for the MLPC in the riding of Hamilton East-Stoney Creek and received 95 votes. Wendell Fields ran in the federal election in 2015 as a Marxist-Leninist candidate.

He remained active in the Hamilton activist community as of 2005.
