= Wellington Street (Hamilton, Ontario) =

Road in Hamilton, Ontario, Canada

Coordinates: 43.2638°N 79.8558°W

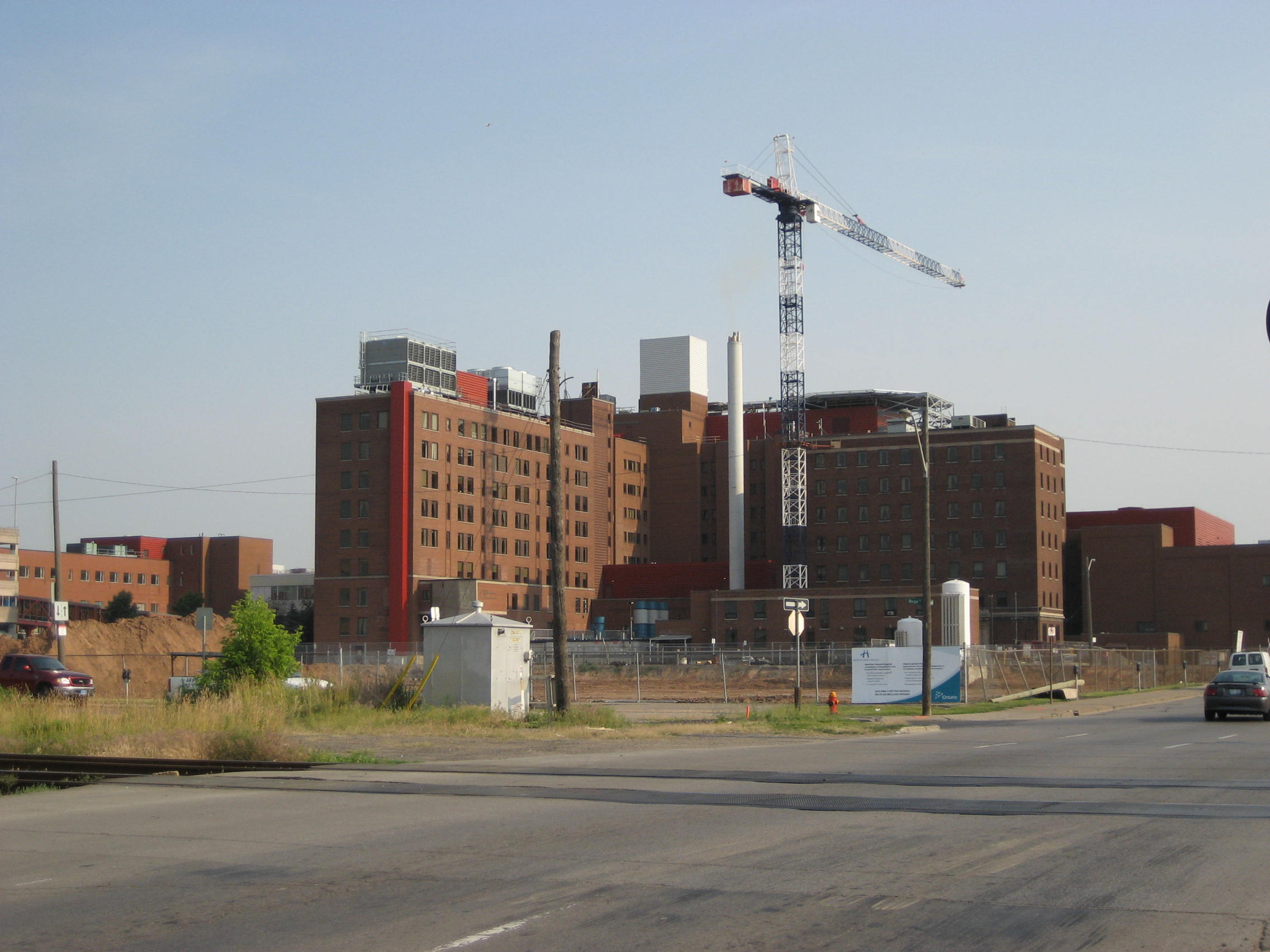
The David Braley Cardiac, Vascular and Stroke Research Institute is a $90-million Research Centre that will be home to 500+ scientists and will be built right behind the Hamilton General Hospital

Wellington Street is a Lower City arterial road in Hamilton, Ontario, Canada. It starts off at Charlton Avenue East as a two-way street for only one block where it's then blocked off by the Corktown Park and a couple of Canadian National Railway lines that cut through it. It then starts up again north of the park on Young Street and is a one-way street the rest of the way (Southbound). It ends in the North End of the City on Burlington Street East, in front of the Lakeport Brewing Company and the Administration offices of the Hamilton Port Authority.

== History ==
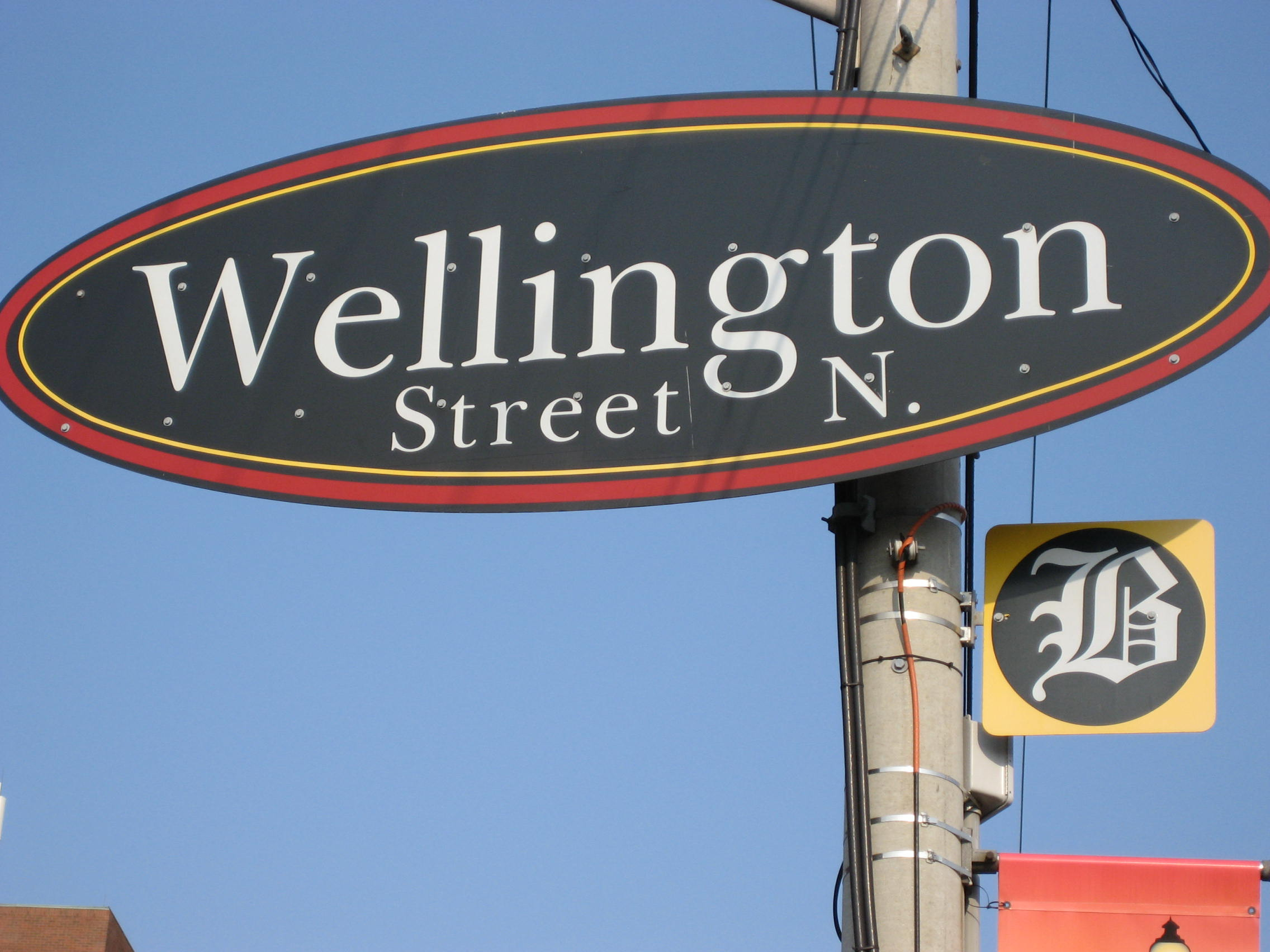

Originally Wellington Street was called Lovers' Lane.

The Hamilton General Hospital is major teaching hospital on the corners of Barton Street East and Wellington Street North in downtown Hamilton, Ontario that is affiliated with McMaster University. It is sometimes referred to as "HGH" and was founded in 1848.

The David Braley Cardiac, Vascular and Stroke Research Institute is a $90-million Research Centre that will be home to 500+ scientists and will be built right behind the Hamilton General Hospital. The new building with 165,000 square feet (15,300 m^{2}) is expected to open in 2010. At least 250 new jobs will be added to the local economy. David Braley contributed $10-million towards the project. Braley's donation marks an important transition in Hamilton's economy, as he takes money he made in the industrial economy and uses it to help the community develop a more diverse economic base. David Braley is the president of auto-parts manufacturer Orlick Industries Ltd., former owner of the Hamilton Tiger-Cats and current owner of the B.C. Lions.

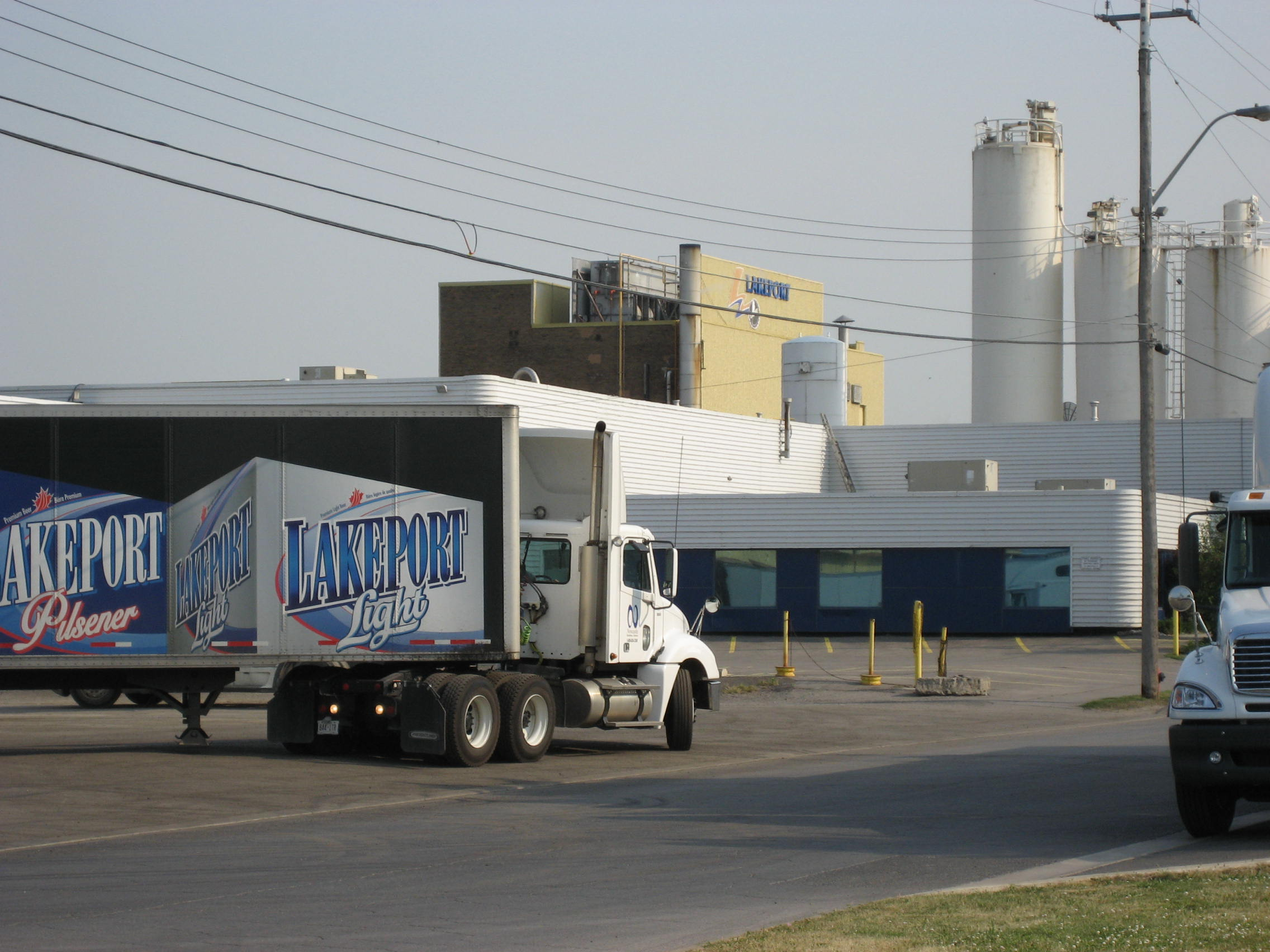
Lakeport Brewery

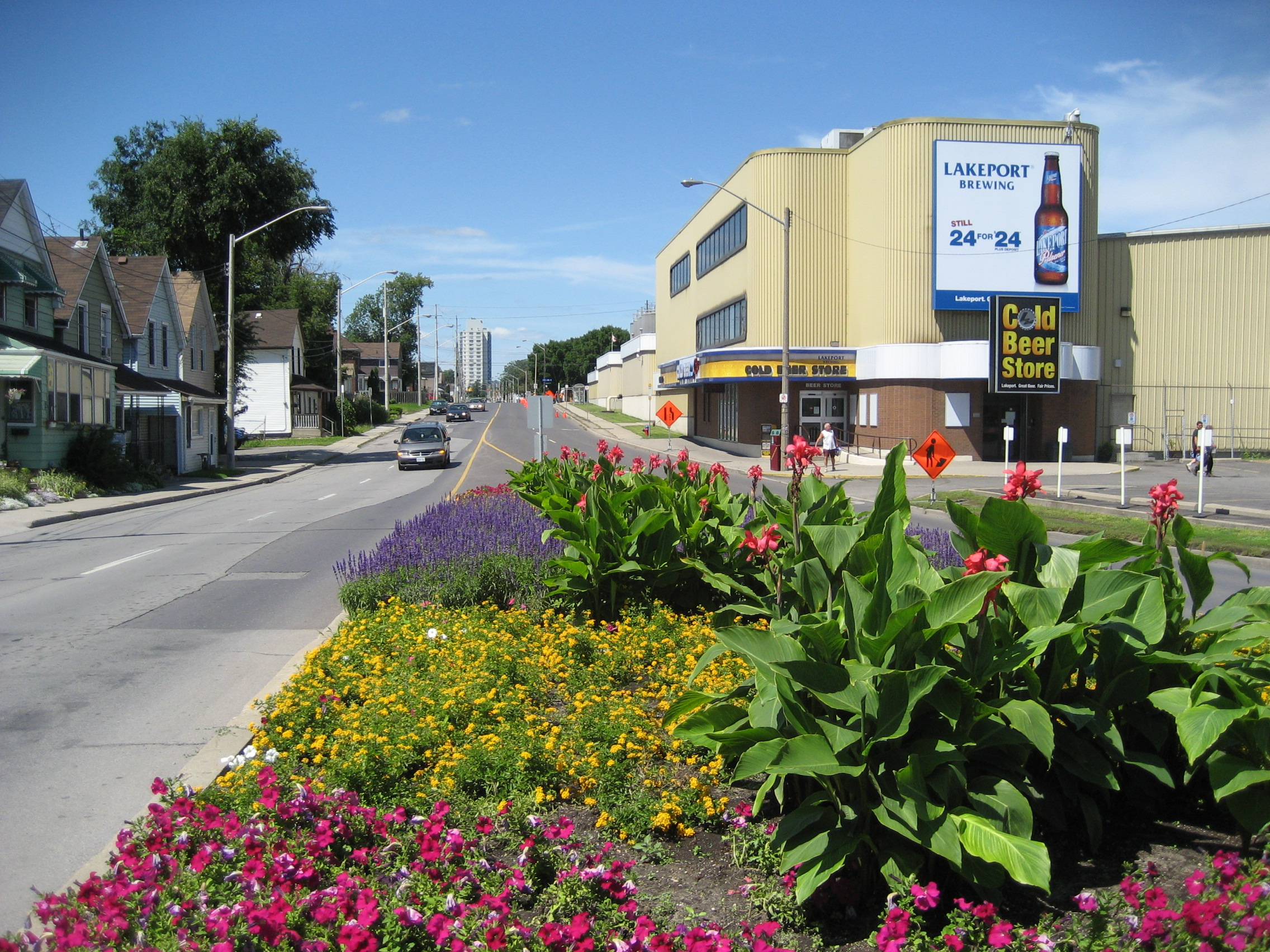
Lakeport Brewery

In 1856, the Daniel C. Gunn Engine Shop on Wellington Street North, produced the first Canadian-built locomotives. In 1976, First Place apartments, a seniors high rise at King and Wellington opened on the site of First United Church, which burned down in 1969.

Lakeport Brewing Company is based in Hamilton and focused on producing value-priced quality beer for the Ontario take-home market. Lakeport pioneered the "24 for $24" value segment. Lakeport produces nine proprietary beer brands, two of which, Lakeport Honey Lager and Lakeport Pilsener, are two of the top ten selling brands in the province of Ontario. Lakeport has more than 200 employees at its production facility. It is one of the fastest-growing companies in the Hamilton region. Lakeport Brewing Company joined forces with the Hamilton Port Authority who will finance and construct a 35,000 square foot (3,250 m^{2}) expansion to Lakeport's Hamilton harbour front facility. Lakeport Brewing Company is Canada's No.1 co-packer of beer, non-alcohol and spirit-based products. The company is also said to be North America's most modernized beverage alcohol production facility. On Monday May 8, Labatt Brewing Company made it official and announced that Lakeport, who they purchased earlier in the year, (March 29, 2007), for $200-million for rights to the income trust, which controlled the plant, will continue to operate in the City of Hamilton. It will continue to operate in Hamilton as they believe it is a "viable plant" and "the company is proud to integrate it with Labbat's." The operations employees continue to brew Lakeport in Hamilton but the marketing and sales jobs are now centralized at Labatt's head offices.

Kenesky Sports on Barton & Wellington Streets is the site where Emile "Pops" Kenesky invented the hockey goalie pads in 1917. His new pads were cricket pads, modified, and widened to approximately 12 inches. The new pads caught on extremely quickly, and this style of pad was used by a majority of pro goalies right on to the 1970s. NHL greats like Johnny Bower, Jacques Plante and Terry Sawchuk having worn them. Kenesky's company became the best-known manufacturer of hockey equipment in Canada. Also a hockey school for hockey goalies of all-ages. Alumni include NHLers Ray Emery and Dwayne Roloson.

== Landmarks ==
Note: Listing of Landmarks from North to South.

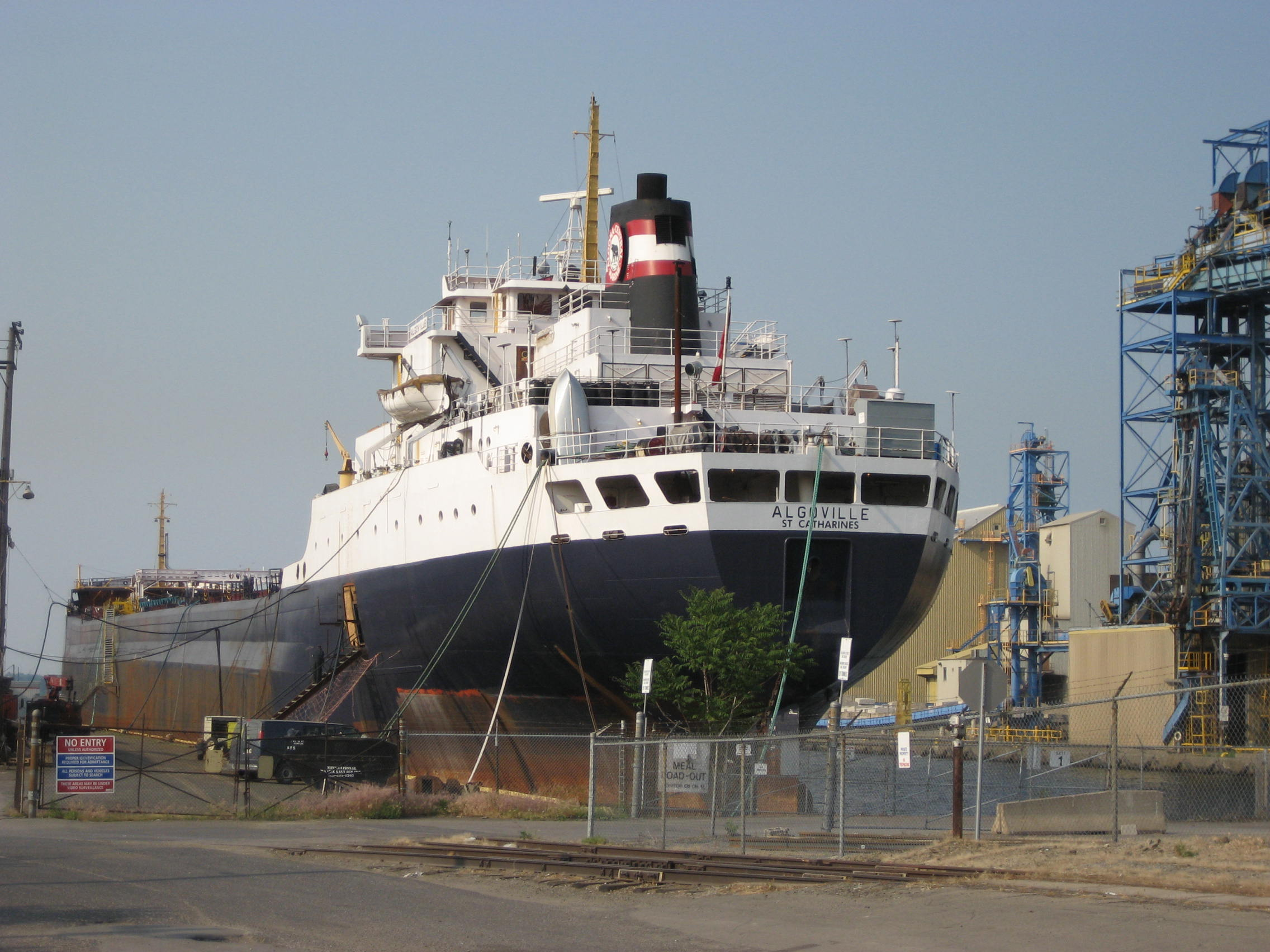
Hamilton Port Authority

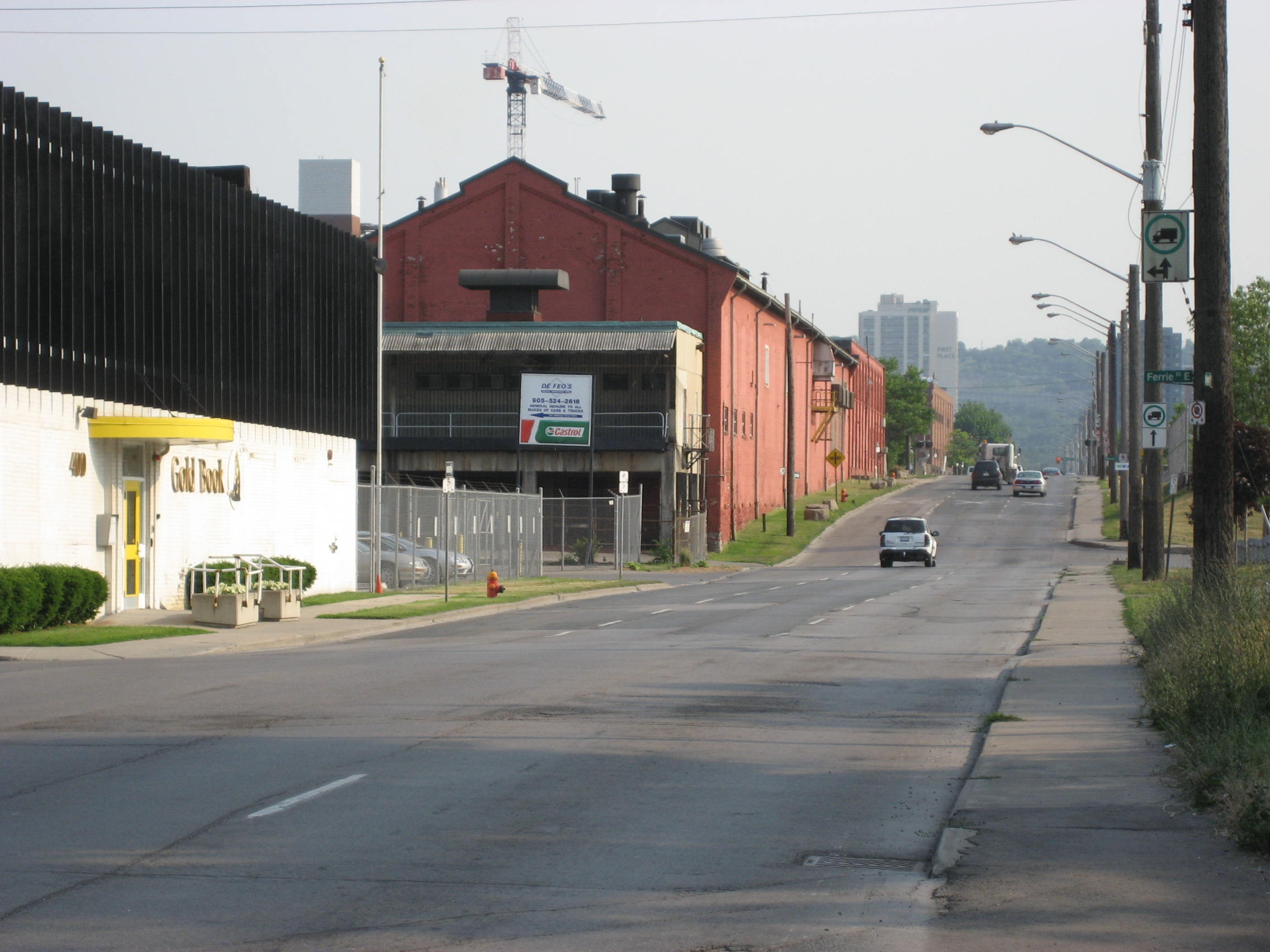
Wellington North, walking tour

- Pier 10
- Hamilton Port Authority, Administration Office
- Lakeport Brewing Company
- Canadian National railway tracks
- Hamilton General Hospital
- David Braley Cardiac, Vascular and Stroke Research Institute
- Kenesky Sports & Cycle Co. Ltd.
- Wellington Park
- First Place Hamilton, Seniors apartment building
- Corktown Park
- Escarpment Rail Trail (abandoned railway path)
- Bruce Trail
- Niagara Escarpment (mountain)

== Communities ==
Note: Listing of neighbourhoods from North to South

- North End - Everything north of the Canadian National Railway tracks
- Beasley/ Landsdale, Wellington Street is the division between these two neighbourhoods.
- Corktown, Stinson, Wellington Street is the division between these two neighbourhoods.

== Images ==
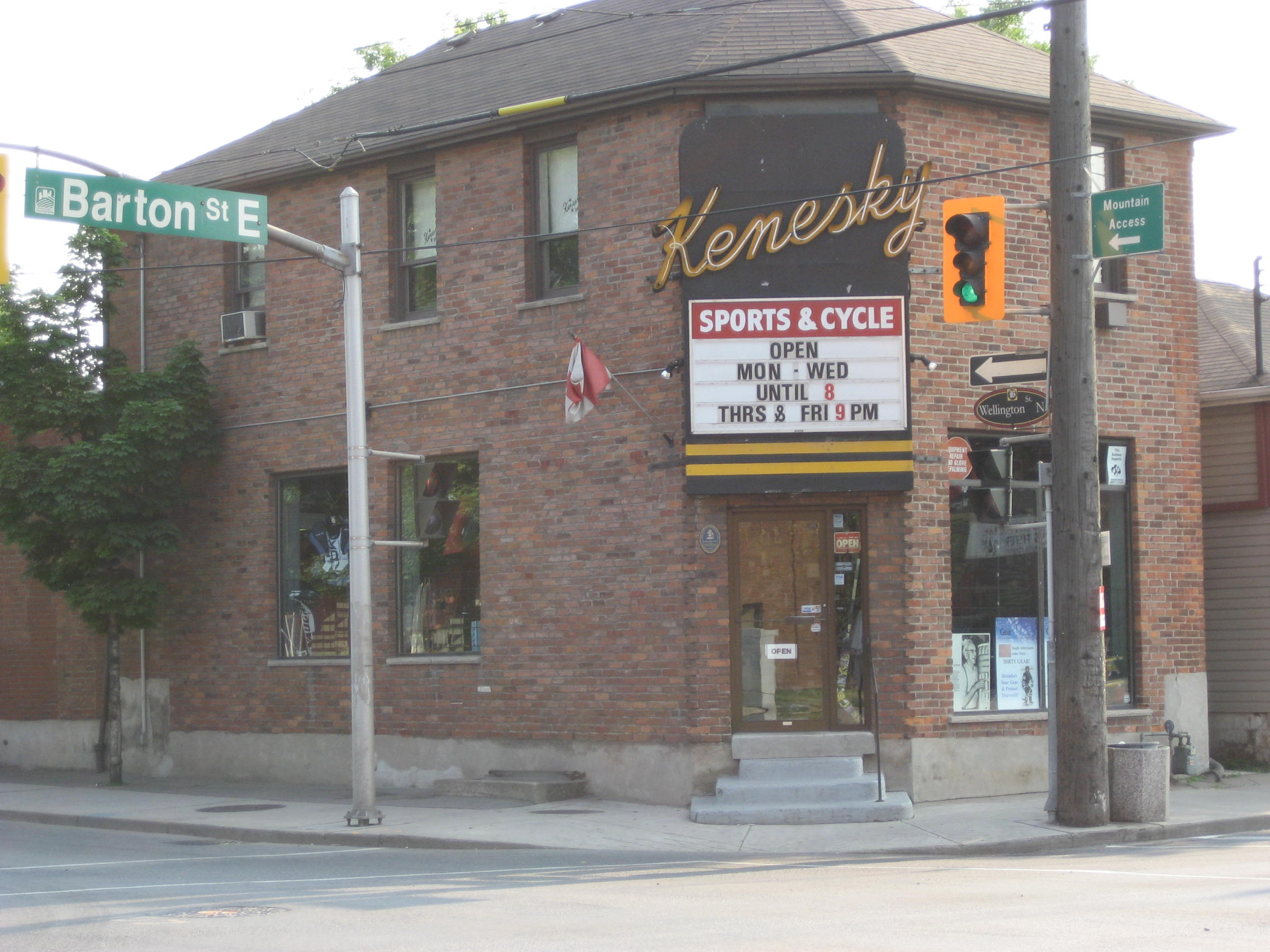
Kenesky's Sports, site of hockey goalie pads invention

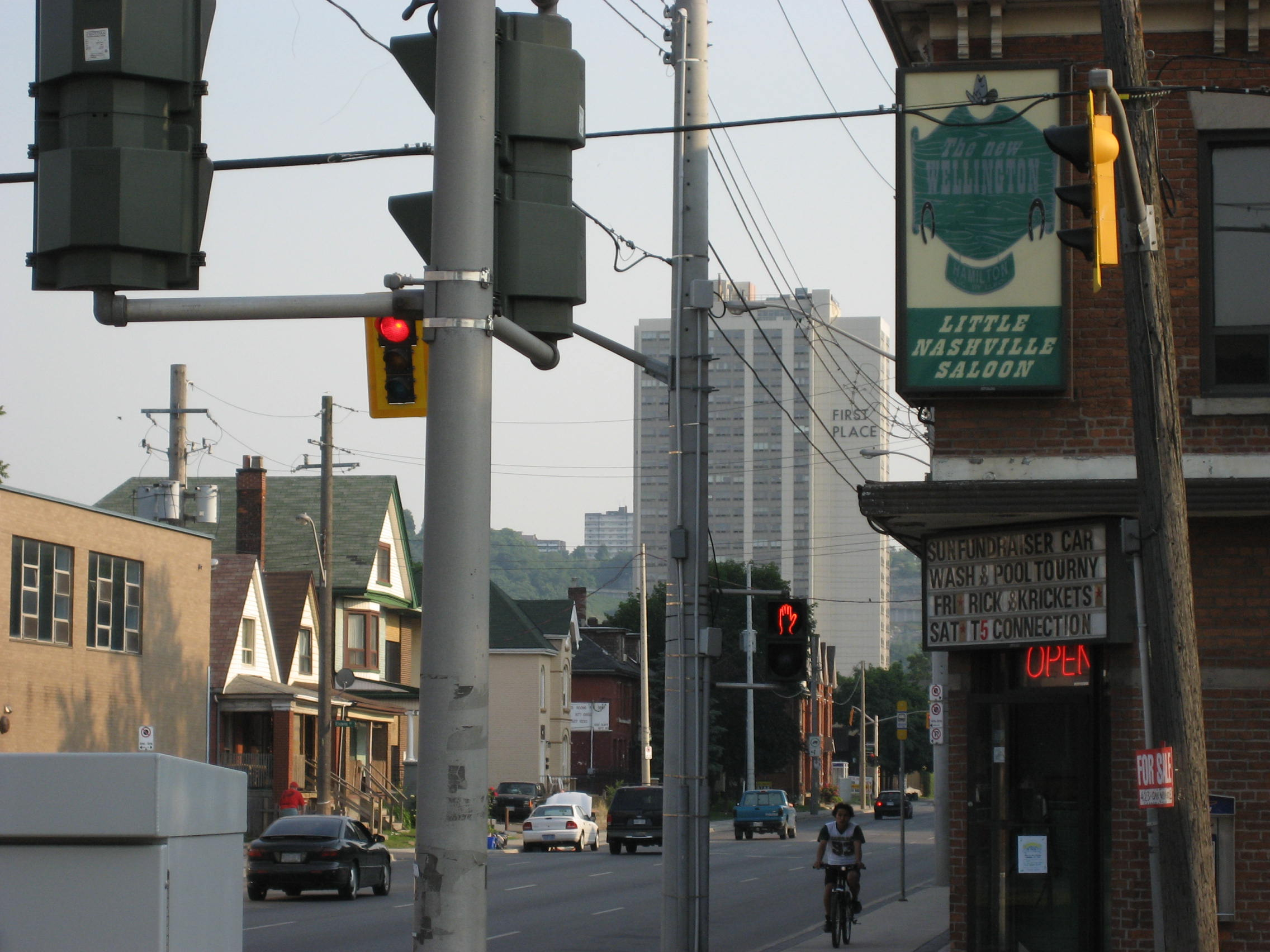
Wellington South, walking tour

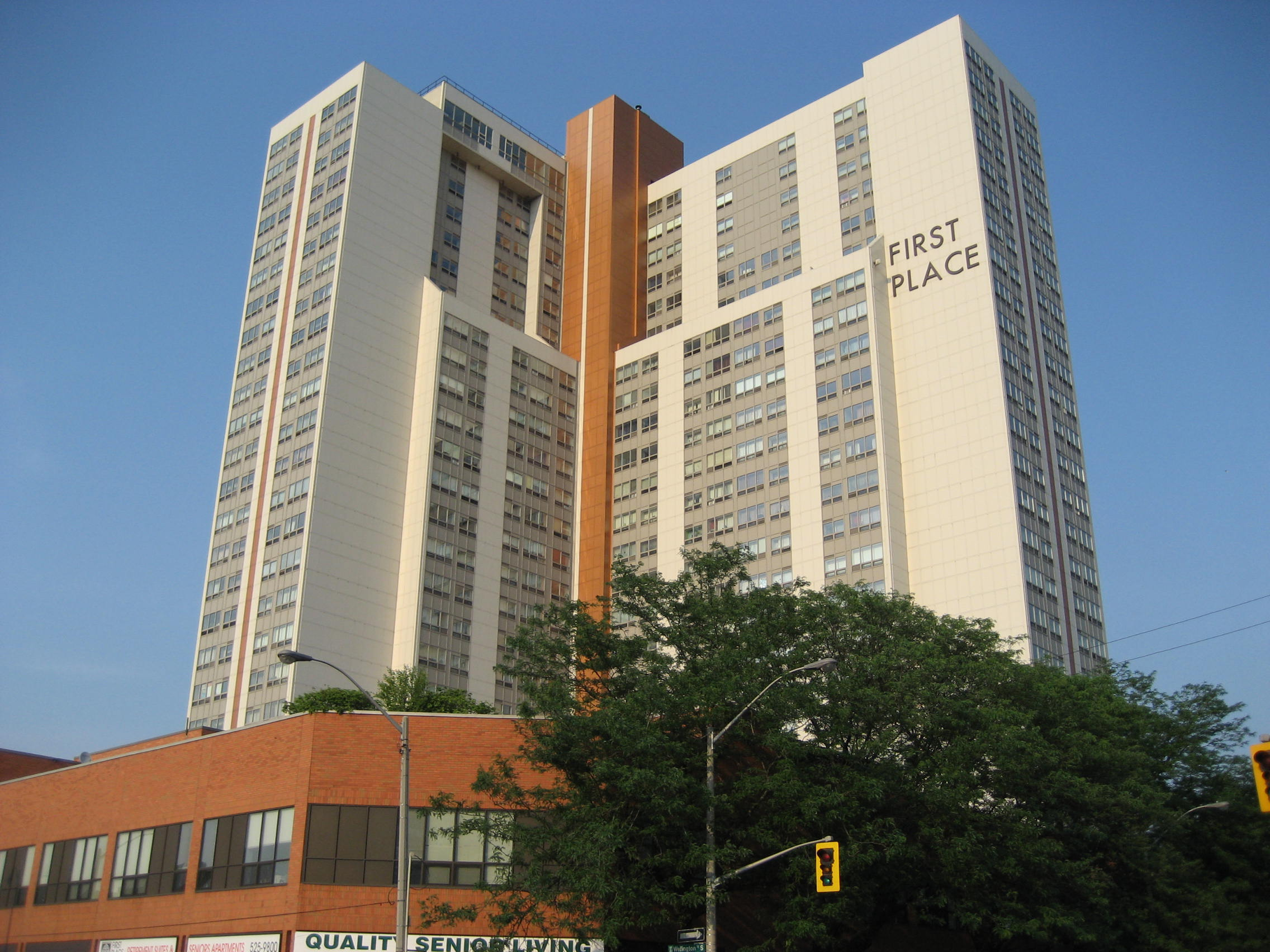
First Place Hamilton, Seniors Apartments

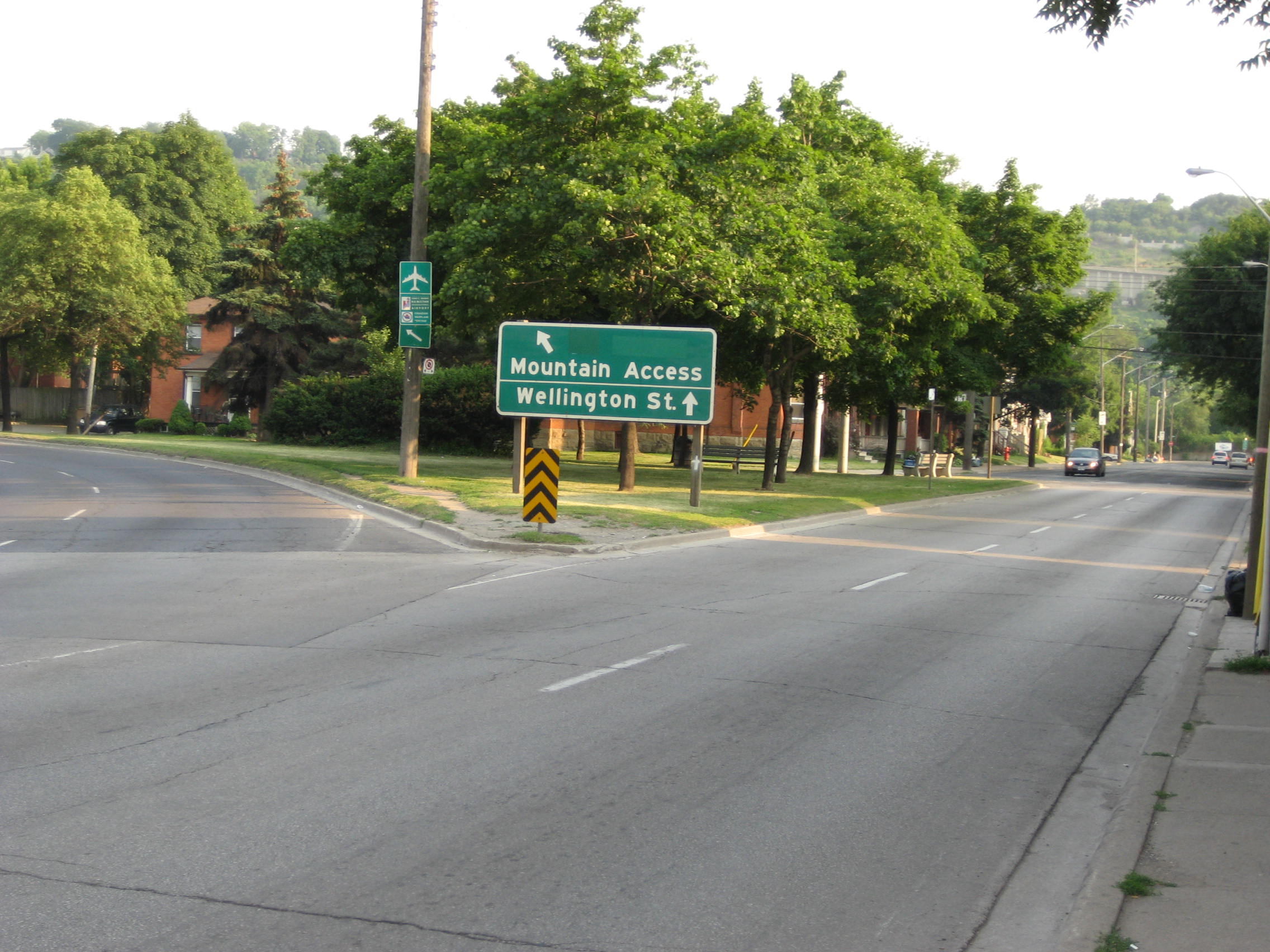
Wellington South, walking tour

== See also ==
- Niagara Escarpment Commission
