= Ottawa Street =

Road in Hamilton, Ontario, Canada

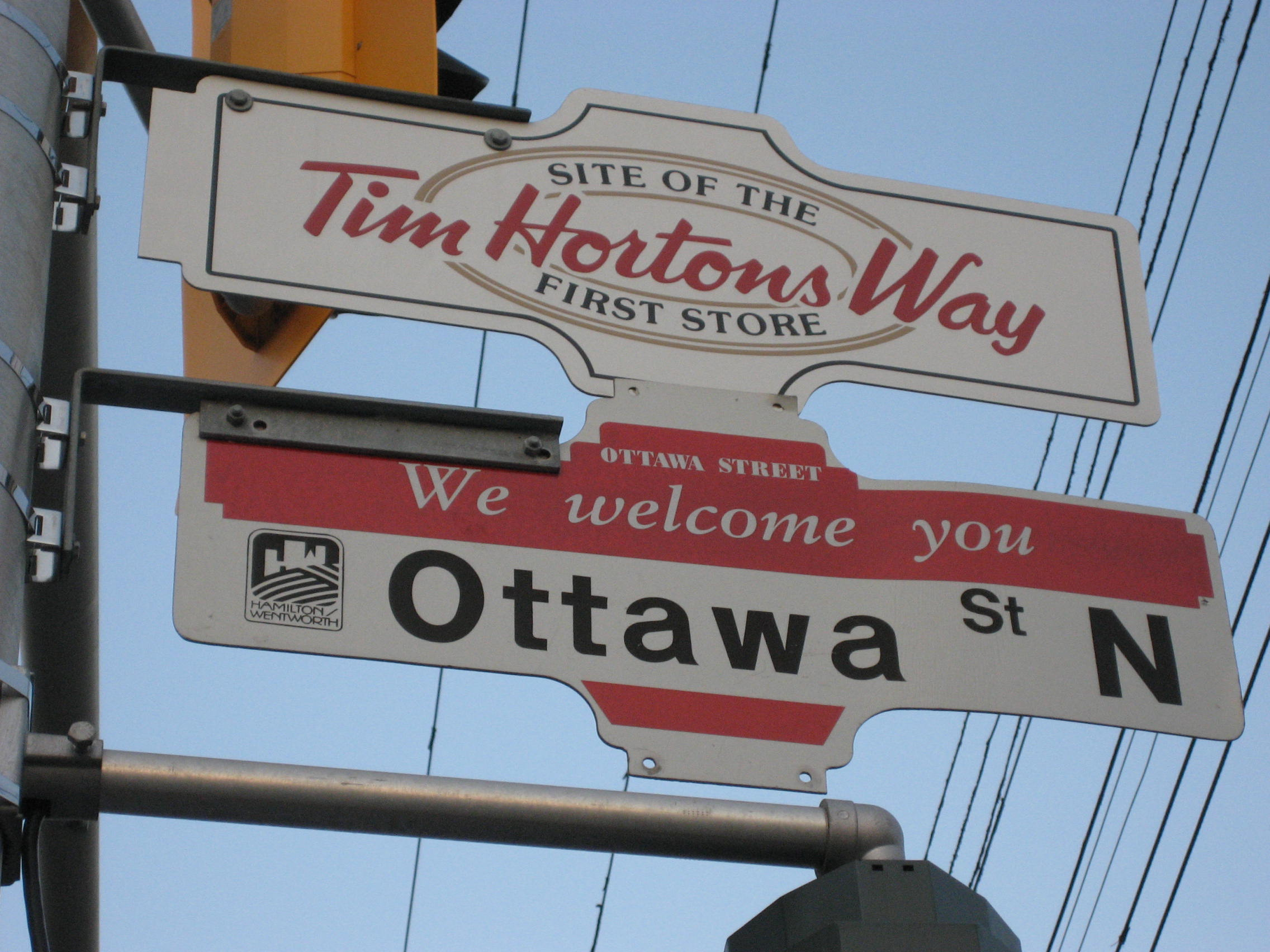

Ottawa Street is a Lower City arterial road in Hamilton, Ontario, Canada. It starts off at Lawrence Road at the base of the Niagara Escarpment (mountain) and is a two-way street throughout, cutting through the Delta and Crown Point neighbourhoods and the City's North End industrial neighbourhood. It ends at Industrial Drive, the site of the Dofasco steel company. This used to be one of the east ends' mountain access roads - it continued south over the train tracks at Lawrence Road and quickly turned right towards the brick manufacturing plant once known as Hamilton Brick. It took several turns before joining what is now the Kenilworth Access near the old water reservoir entrance. Its routing up the mountain is fairly consistent with the current Kenilworth Access with one exception - another hair-pin turn at the top; not the traffic circle that is present now. It was because of these hair-pin turns that the Hamilton Street Railway discontinued bus service on this road in 1944, and why the City planned a new Kenilworth Access to the east which opened in 1957.

== History ==
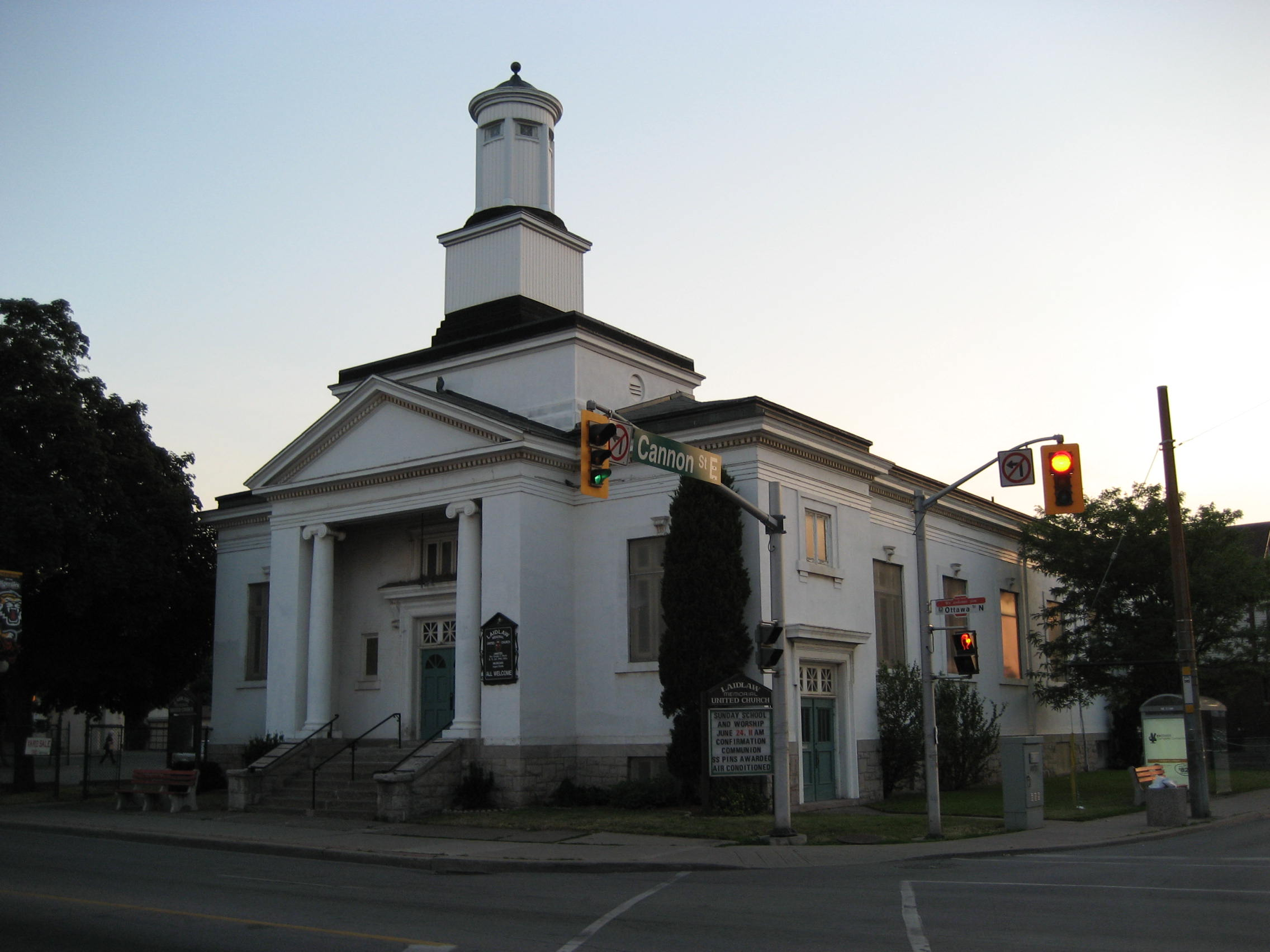
Laidlaw United Church, Ottawa Street South

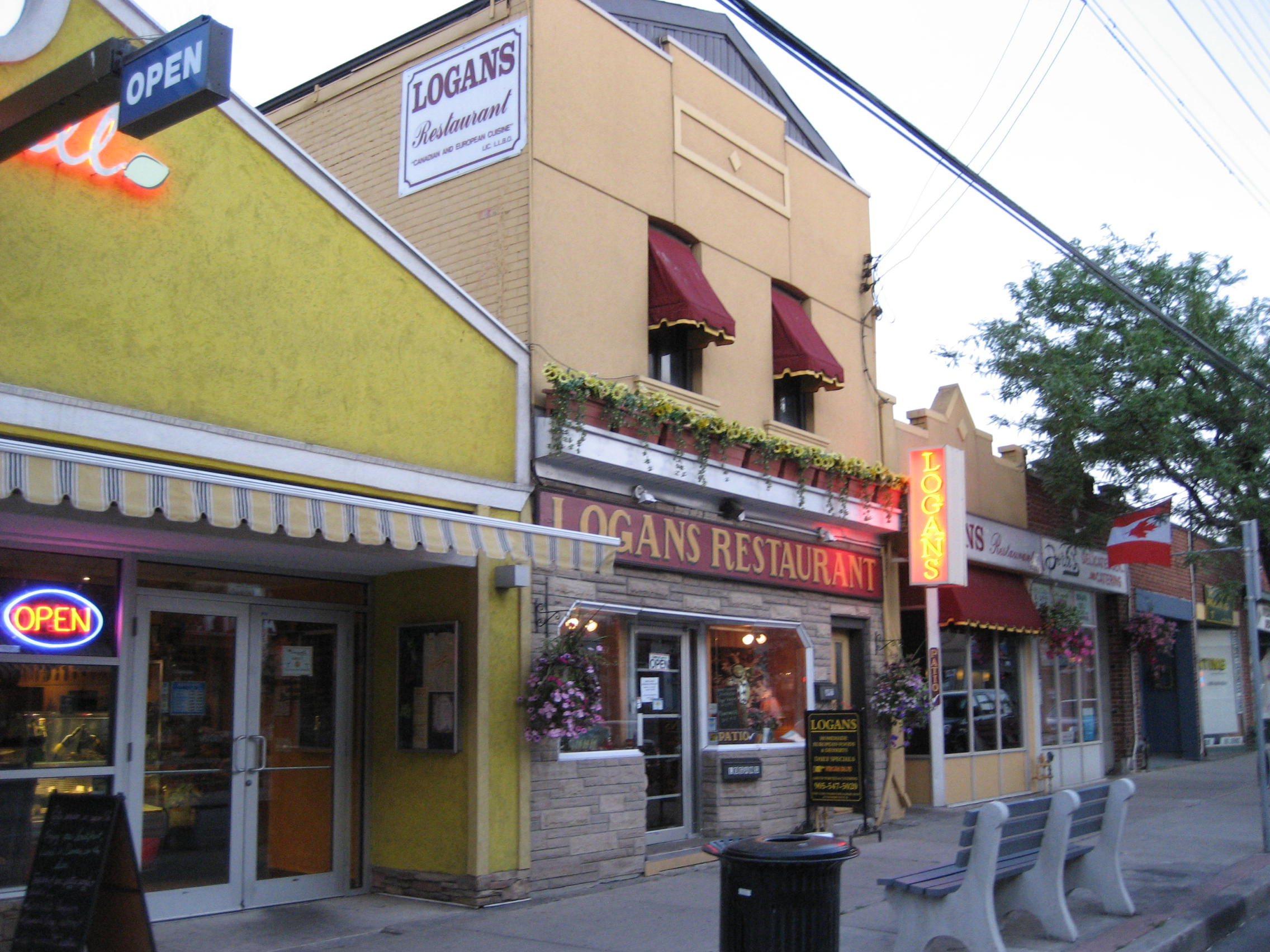
Ottawa Street North, Textile district

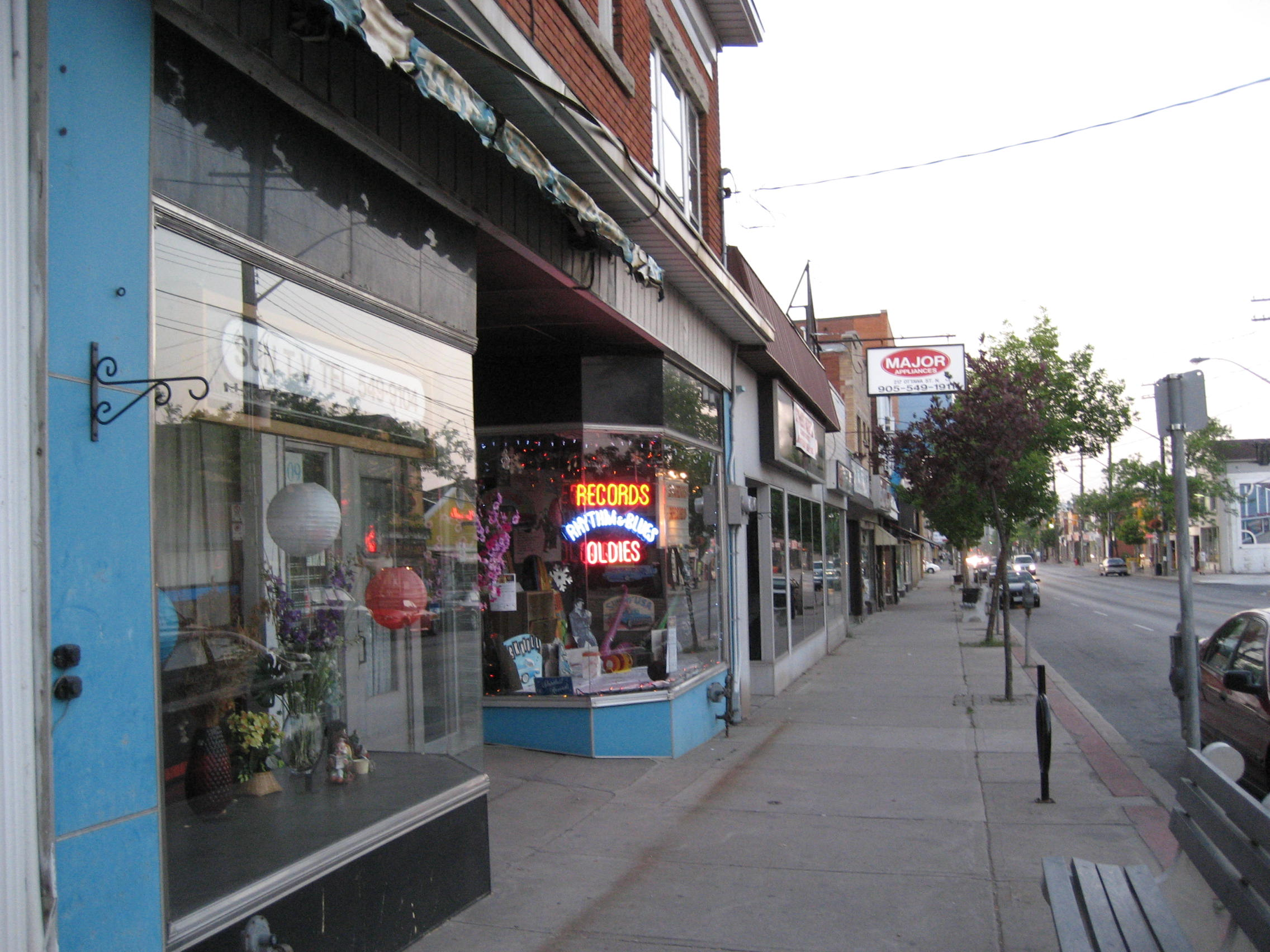
Ottawa Street North, Shopping district

In 1862, The city had invested in the Great Western Railway but the government of Canada favoured the rival Grand Trunk Railway. Also, after the end of the Depression (1857–1862), the population dips downwards in Hamilton and the city could not meet the interest on its bonds, many of which were held by British investors. To save the city from its creditors temporarily, Henry Beasley removes the assessment rolls, thus preventing a levy of special tax. Foundries and machine shops associated with the Great Western Railway failed and several established wholesalers closed their accounts. Daniel C. Gunn's locomotive works went bankrupt, but the manufacturers of farm implements and stoves-the mainstays of iron foundries- were able to weather the crisis. Those owned by Dennis Moore and the Copp brothers endured, but their employees suffered wage cuts and layoffs. Canadian patent laws and the underemployed workers skilled in machinist trades lured an important new industrial enterprise from the U.S.A.- the manufacture of sewing machines by Richard Wanzer. From this development there evolved the ready-made clothing industry, which William Eli Sanford introduced locally. The Textile District evolved in East Hamilton, centered on Ottawa Street and boomed during the First and Second World Wars.

In 1913, Procter & Gamble Manufacturing Company (based in Cincinnati, Ohio) purchased 7 acres (28,000 m^{2}) of land and 2 acres (8,100 m^{2}) of water on the south side of Burlington Street between Depew and Ottawa Streets. This event marked the beginning of Procter & Gamble's operations outside of the United States. In 1914, construction started on the Procter & Gamble Hamilton plant, which cost $1 million and consisted of seven buildings: the Crisco building, the boiler house, the gas plant, the soap building, the hardening plant, the kettle and glycerin house, and the machine shop. By 1915, Procter & Gamble officially opens Hamilton plant, employing 75 workers who made six different products.

The Tim Hortons chain was founded in Hamilton in 1964. The original store still operates on Ottawa Street.

== Centre Mall reconstruction project ==
Centre Mall owners announced plans for a 23-building super centre on the property on Barton Street East. Cost is estimated to be around $100-million and will take up 700,000 square feet (65,000 m^{2}) of retail space. This will end up being the largest redevelopment project in the history of Hamilton's east-end. The overhaul will take about two-and-a-half years to complete but the bulk of the work is expected to be done by the end of the summer of 2008. Some new buildings will go up before the enclosed mall is torn down. The redevelopment of Centre Mall is transforming the entire neighbourhood from Ottawa to Kenilworth Avenue. The $100-million investment in the mall has boosted Ottawa Street North - already the city's No.1 tourist destination. The garment district has also morphed into a holistic home decor destination area, complete with lighting, antique, design & glass stores. The Ottawa Street B.I.A. had the most application and grants under the commercial property improvement program in 2007 with thirty three and it had an effect on the property values and real estate activity in the district.

== Landmarks ==
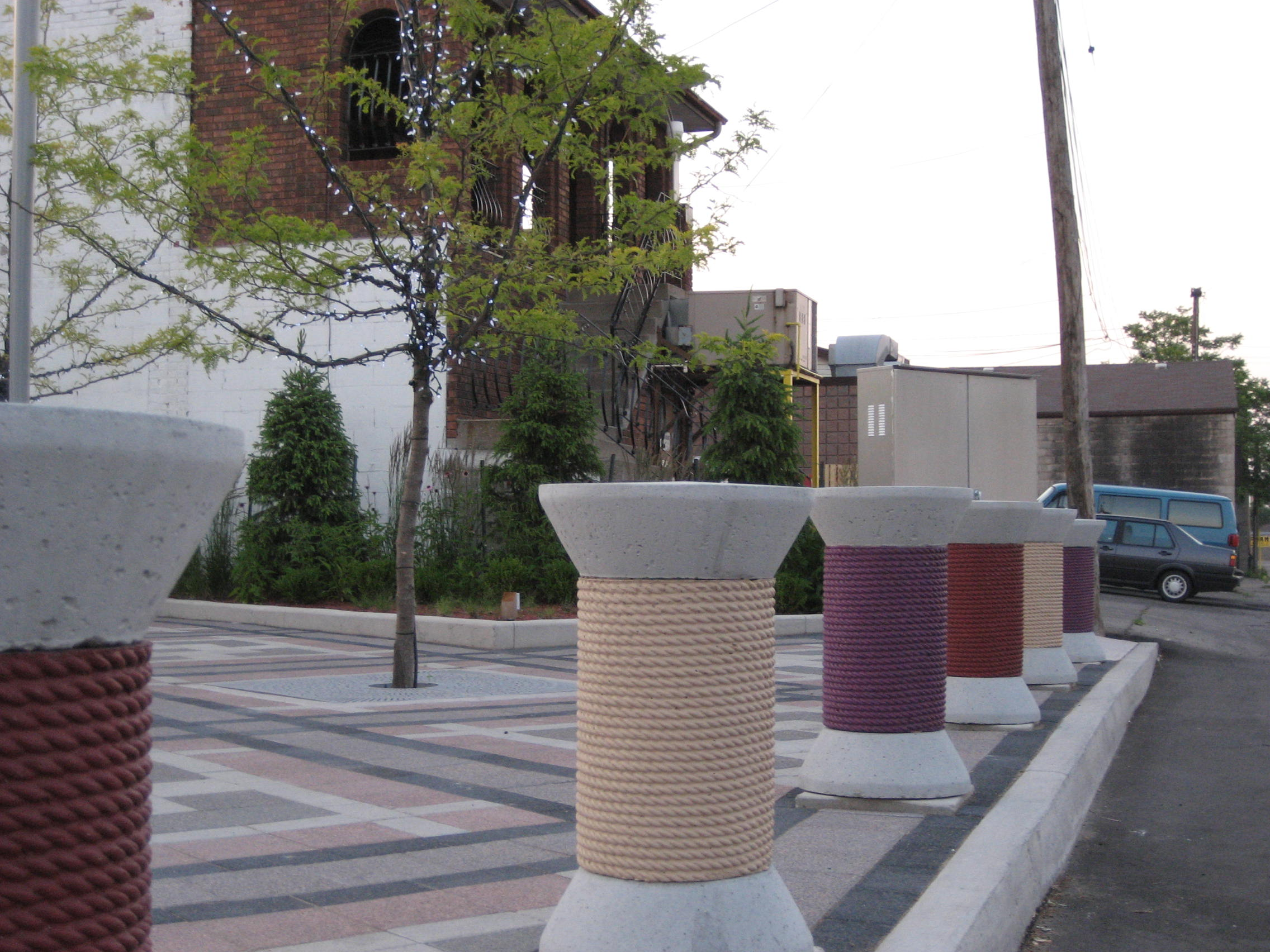
East Kiwanis Place, Ottawa Street North

Note: Listing of landmarks from north to south.

- Dofasco, (steel company)
- site of the old Procter & Gamble Manufacturing Company buildings & property (1913–1998)
- Canadian National railway tracks
- Centre Mall
- Ottawa Street shopping district
- Tim Hortons, original location, opened in 1964 and still in operation
- Bruce Trail
- Mountain Face Park

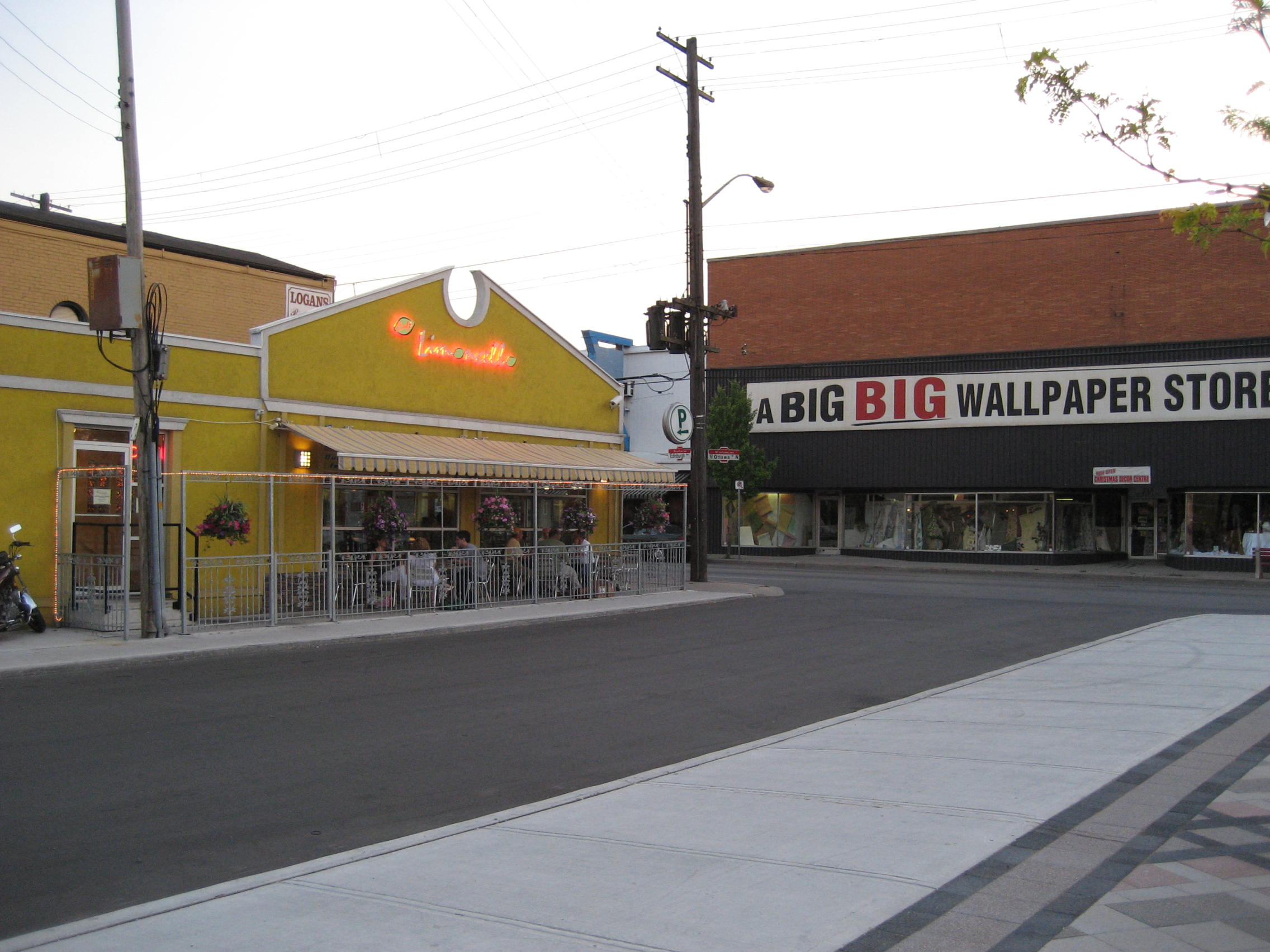
Textile District, Ottawa Street North

== Images ==
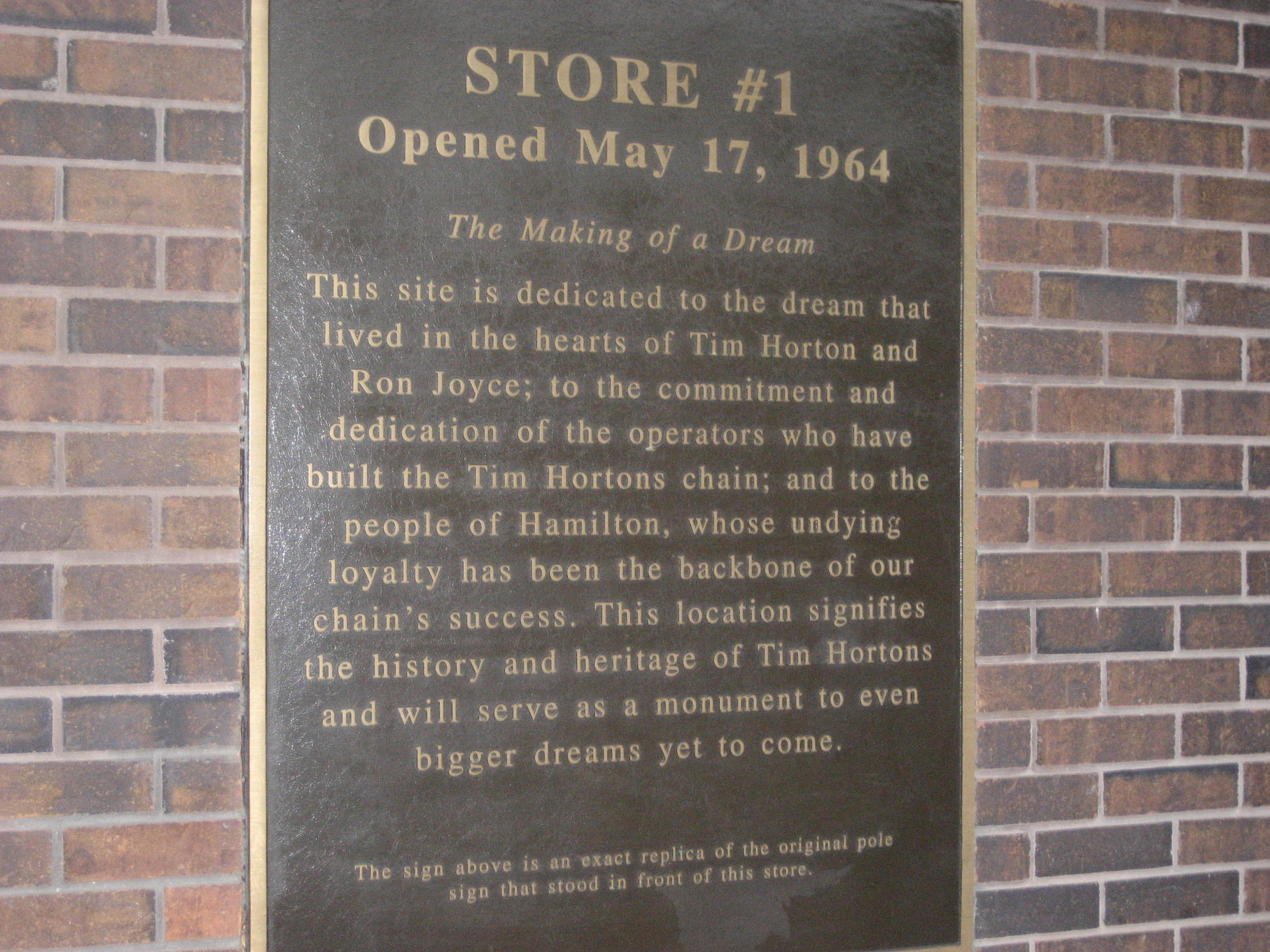
Tim Hortons plaque, 1st store

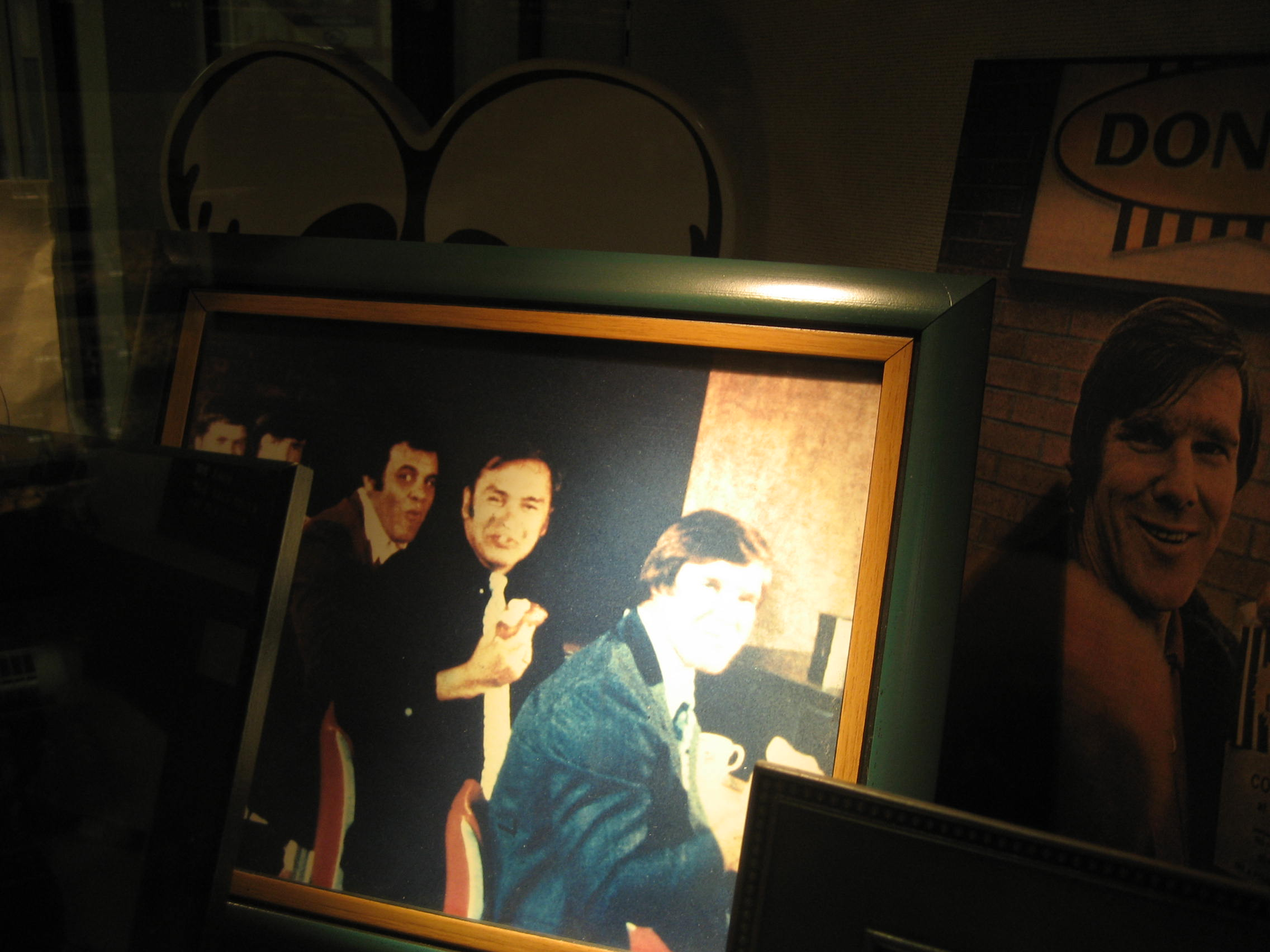
Display case, Tim Hortons, 1st store

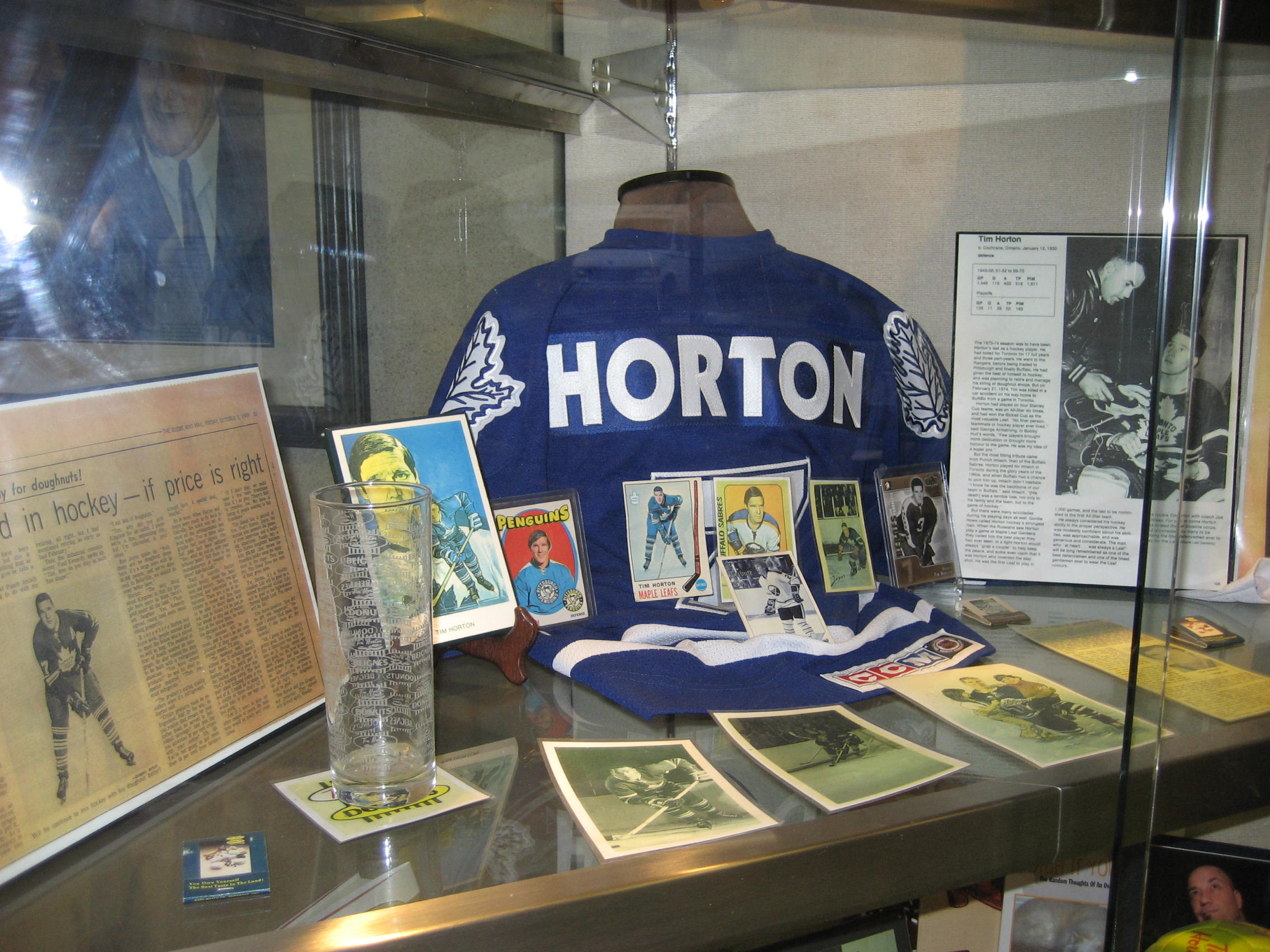
Display case, Tim Hortons, 1st store

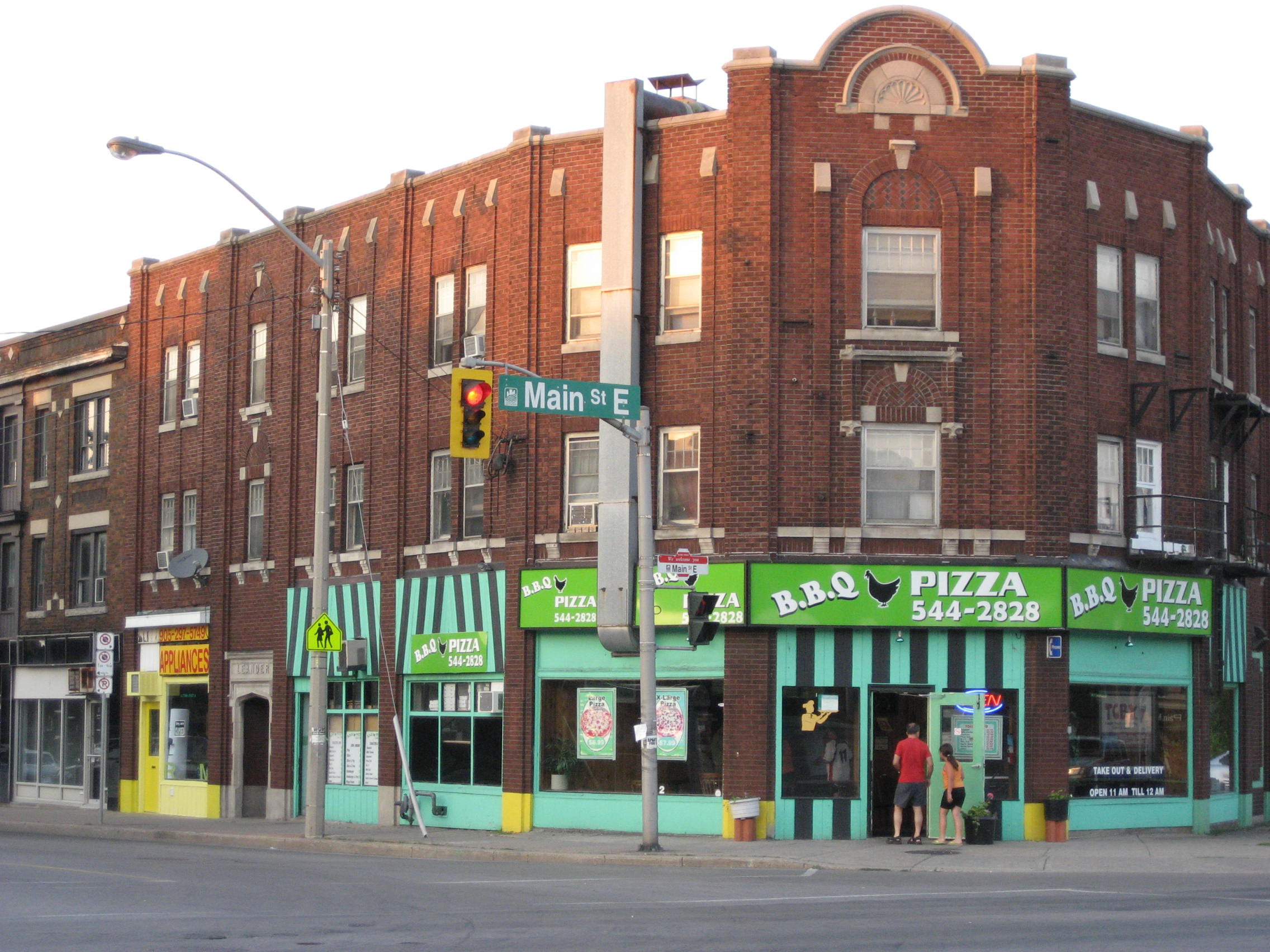
Corner of Ottawa South & Main East

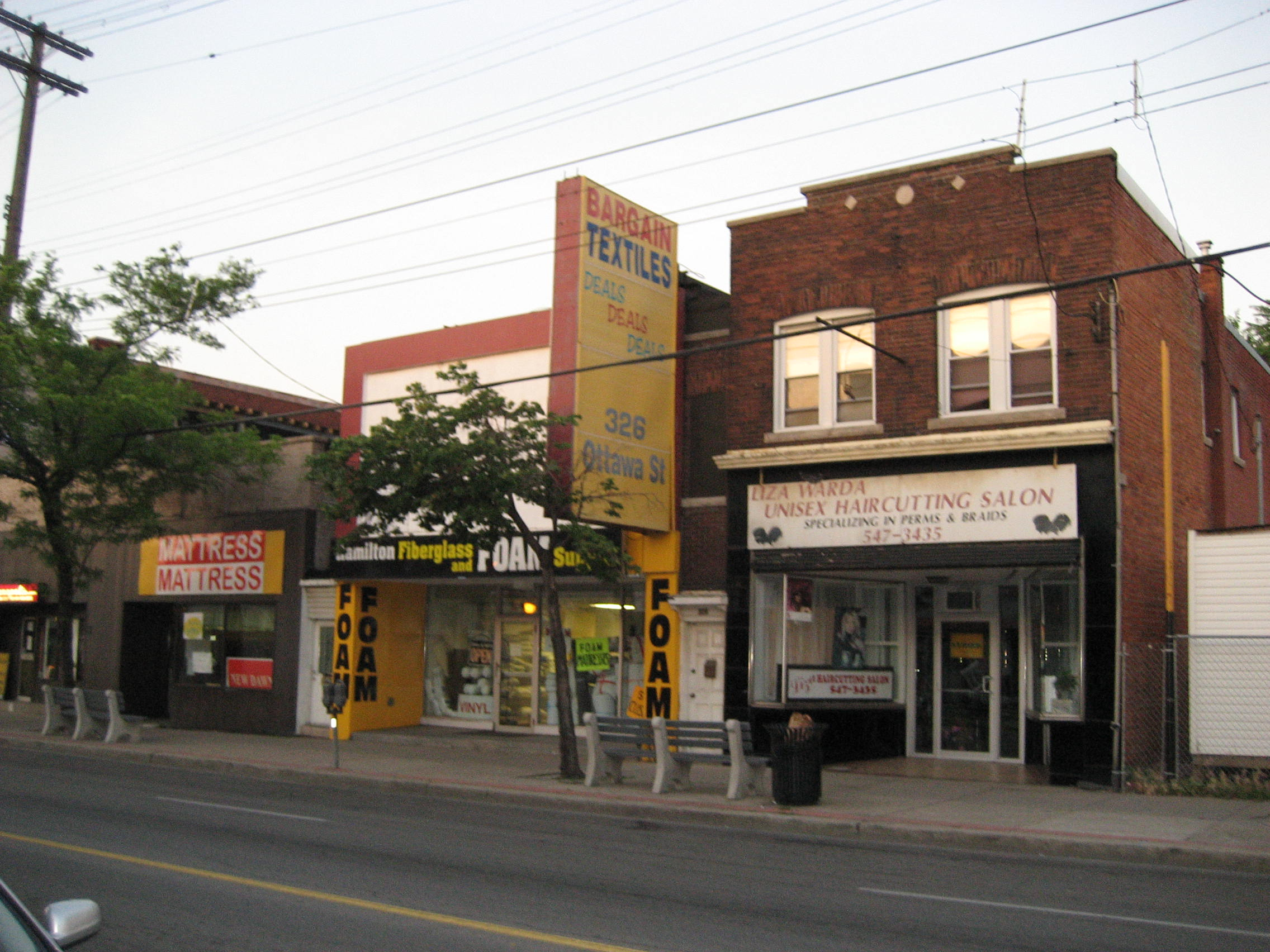
Textile District

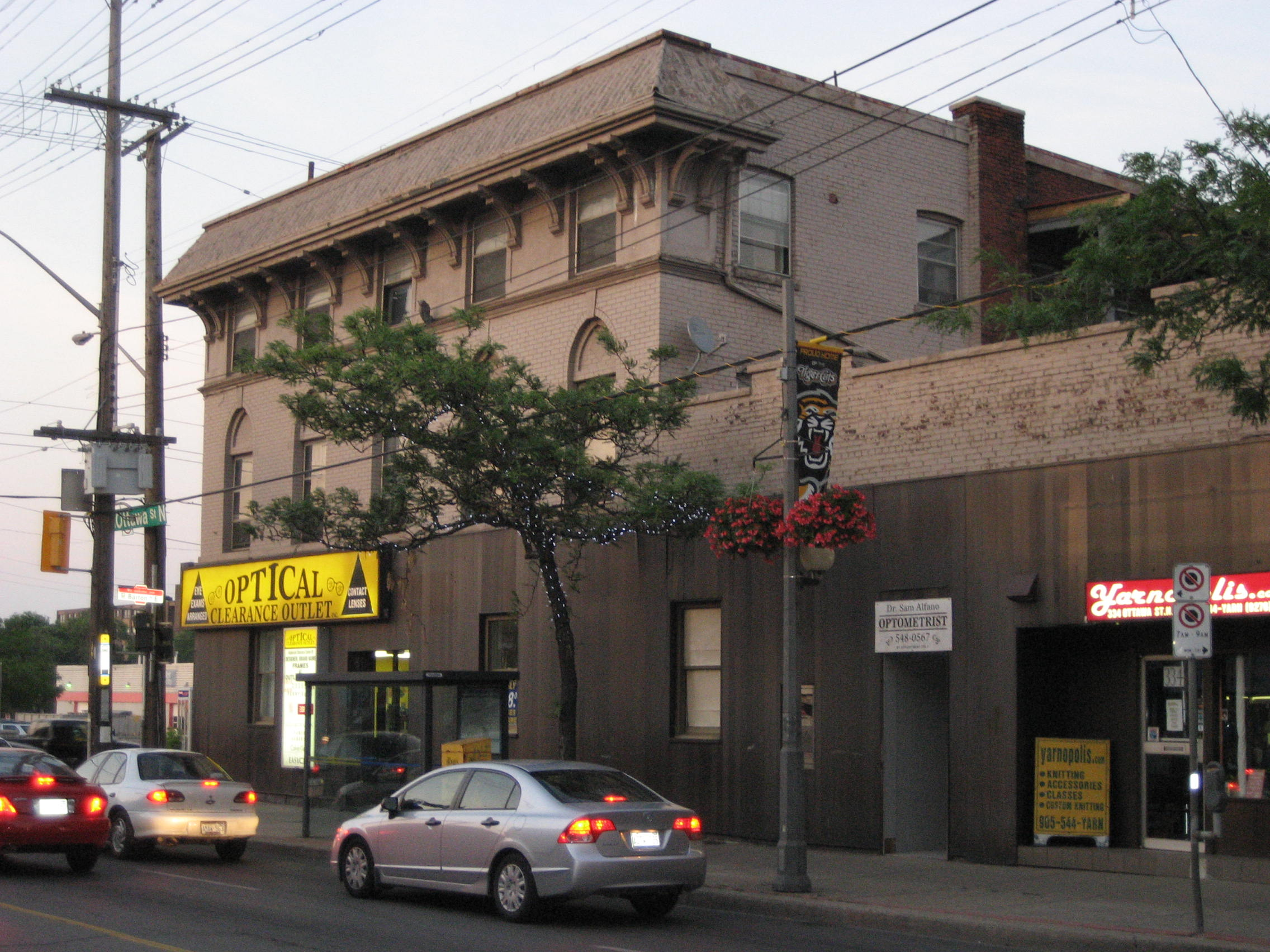
Corner of Ottawa Street North & Barton

== See also ==
- Niagara Escarpment Commission
