= Barton Street (Hamilton, Ontario) =

Arterial road in Hamilton, Ontario, Canada

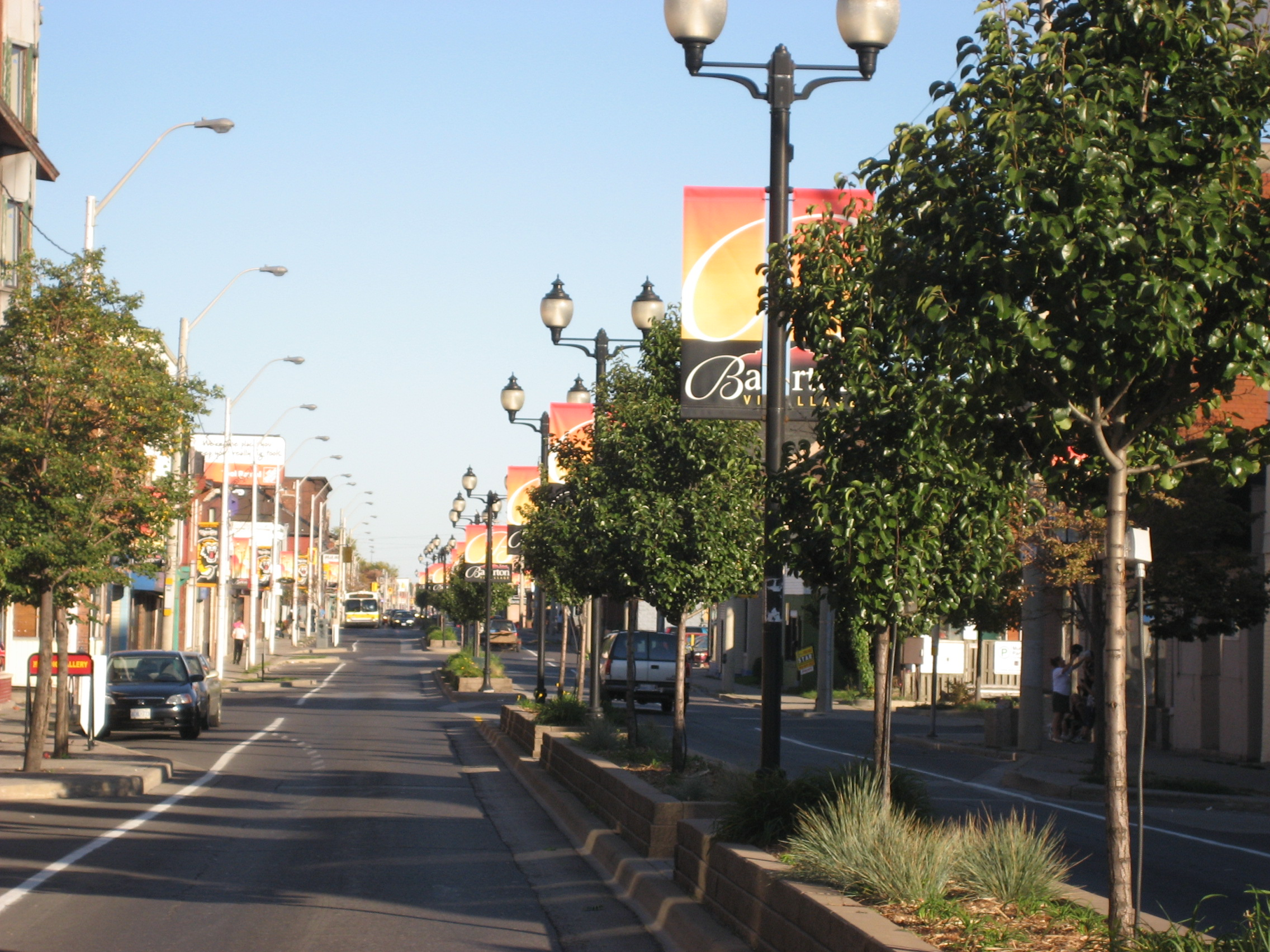
Barton Street East, looking East

Barton Street is an arterial road in the Lower City of Hamilton, Ontario, Canada. It is the longest street (21.0 km) in the city. It starts at the north end of downtown at Locke Street North and is a two-way street that stretches eastward through a number of different and varied communities in the city. It ends in the Winona neighbourhood at Fifty Road, just west of the Hamilton/Niagara regional boundary. The street is divided along James Street into East and West portions. However, the East designation does not continue through the Stoney Creek district (which includes Winona) due to Stoney Creek being a separate municipality prior to amalgamation in 2001. The Street has had a negative reputation for years due to crime, with residents of Hamilton calling the Street "Hamilton's Redlight District".

== History ==
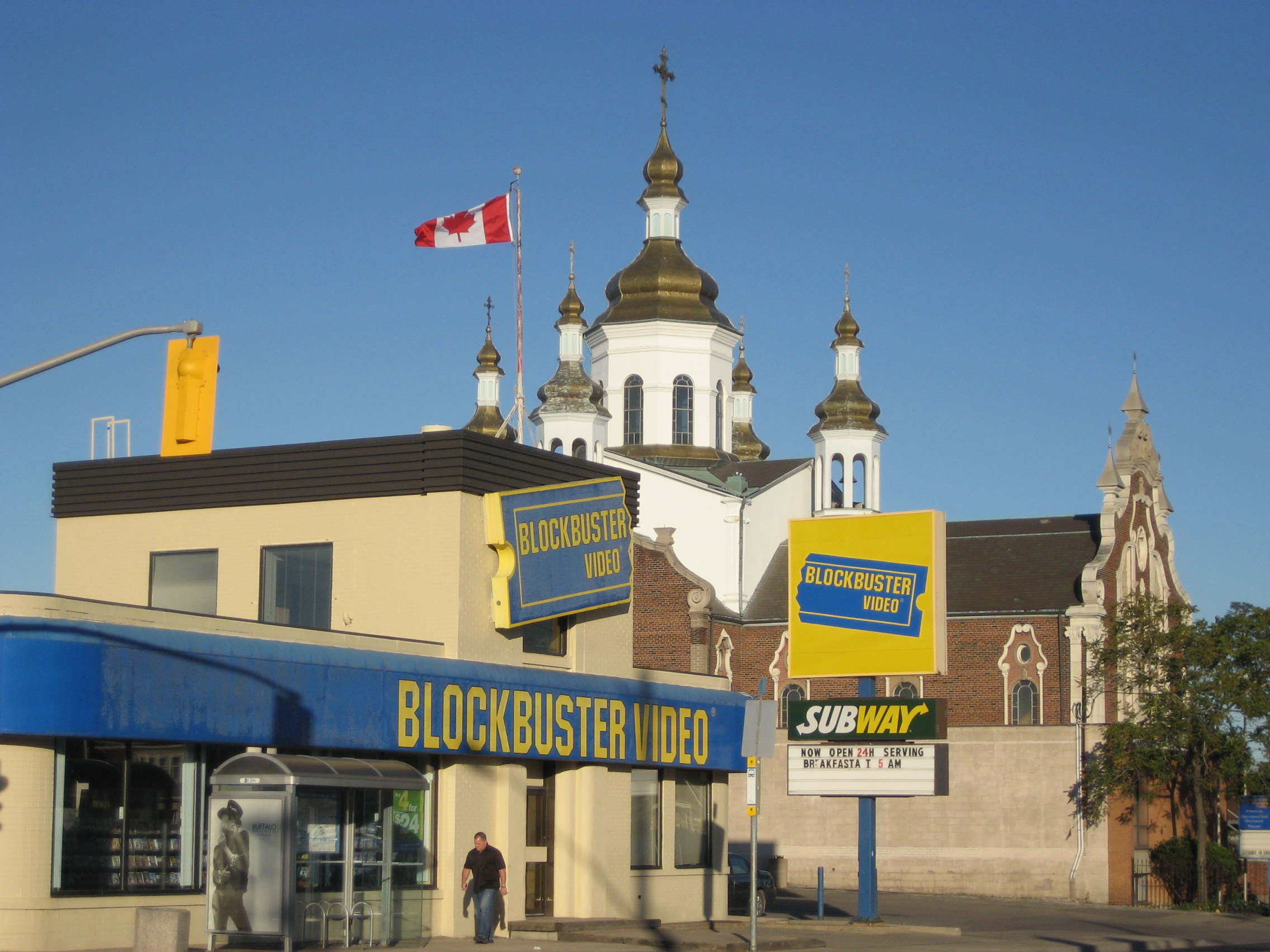
Barton Street East pictured in 2007 with the Ukrainian Orthodox Cathedral of St. Vladimir in the background

In the early days Hamilton was known as Barton township, named after a township in Lincoln County, England. Barton Street is all that remains of the township. In 1816, the Barton township population was 668.

On 24 May 1909, a Coney Island-type amusement Park was opened in Hamilton. It was known as Maple Leaf Park and was bounded by Barton Street (north), Ottawa Street (east), Cannon Street (south), Rosslyn Avenue (west). It failed to attract enough visitors to keep the gates open and only lasted a year. Investors of the Park sold the land to local real estate speculators for $25,000 interested in the property because the land itself was a valuable commodity in the booming East Hamilton market. It had a "Figure 8" roller coaster. This was the most popular coaster model of the era, with many Canadian parks having one. Most were built by Fred Ingersoll.

Barton Street East changed locations in the late 1960s. Barton Street East heading east from Strathearne Avenue originally ended at Walter Avenue, where you continued south on Walter Avenue (to present day Melvin Avenue). It continued east to Fifty Road in Stoney Creek. The section east of Walter Avenue was called Superior Street (for the Superior Propane Company) and it ended close to Talbot Street. Some buildings on Melvin Avenue close to Woodward Avenue still have signage indicating their address as Barton Street East (such as the Barwood Apts, signed as 2041 Barton Street East).

Hamilton's first artificial skating surface was The Forum. Locals referred to it as the Barton Street Arena. It was situated between Sanford Avenue and Wentworth Streets. It opened 8 January 1913. Eventually, a few years down the line it was purchased by Kenneth D. Soble and then he announced a new rink would be built and the new Forum opened up for business 1 October 1953. The rink lasted until 1976. That's when the Junior A hockey club Hamilton Fincups left Hamilton. Demolition started in September 1976.

Present-day Centre Mall used to be the site of the Jockey Club racetrack but in the years after the Second World War the push for Hamilton's eastward expansion had completely engulfed the Jockey Club property. On 26 September 1952 the racetrack was sold. The site would then become the site of the Greater Hamilton Shopping Centre.

Trolley buses served Barton Street from 1951 to the end of 1992. Originally unnumbered, after about 1960 the route was Hamilton Street Railway's route 2–Barton.

== Centre Mall reconstruction project ==
Centre Mall owners announce plans for a 23-building super centre on the property on Barton Street East. Cost is estimated to be around $100-million and will take up 700,000 square feet (65,000 m^{2}) of retail space. This will end up being the largest redevelopment project in the history of Hamilton's east-end. The buildings on the property will be grouped around the edge of the property and create a friendly, pedestrian-oriented design rather than a commercial island in a sea of parking. The overhaul will take about two-and-a-half years to complete but the bulk of the work is expected to be done by the end of the summer of 2008. Some new buildings will go up before the enclosed mall is torn down. The redevelopment of Centre Mall is transforming the entire neighbourhood from Ottawa Street to Kenilworth Avenue. The $100-million investment in the mall has boosted Ottawa Street North - already the city's No.1 tourist destination. The garment district has also morphed into a holistic home decor destination area, complete with lighting, antique, design & glass stores. The Ottawa Street B.I.A. had the most application and grants under the commercial property improvement program in 2007 with thirty three and it had an effect on the property values and real estate activity in the district.

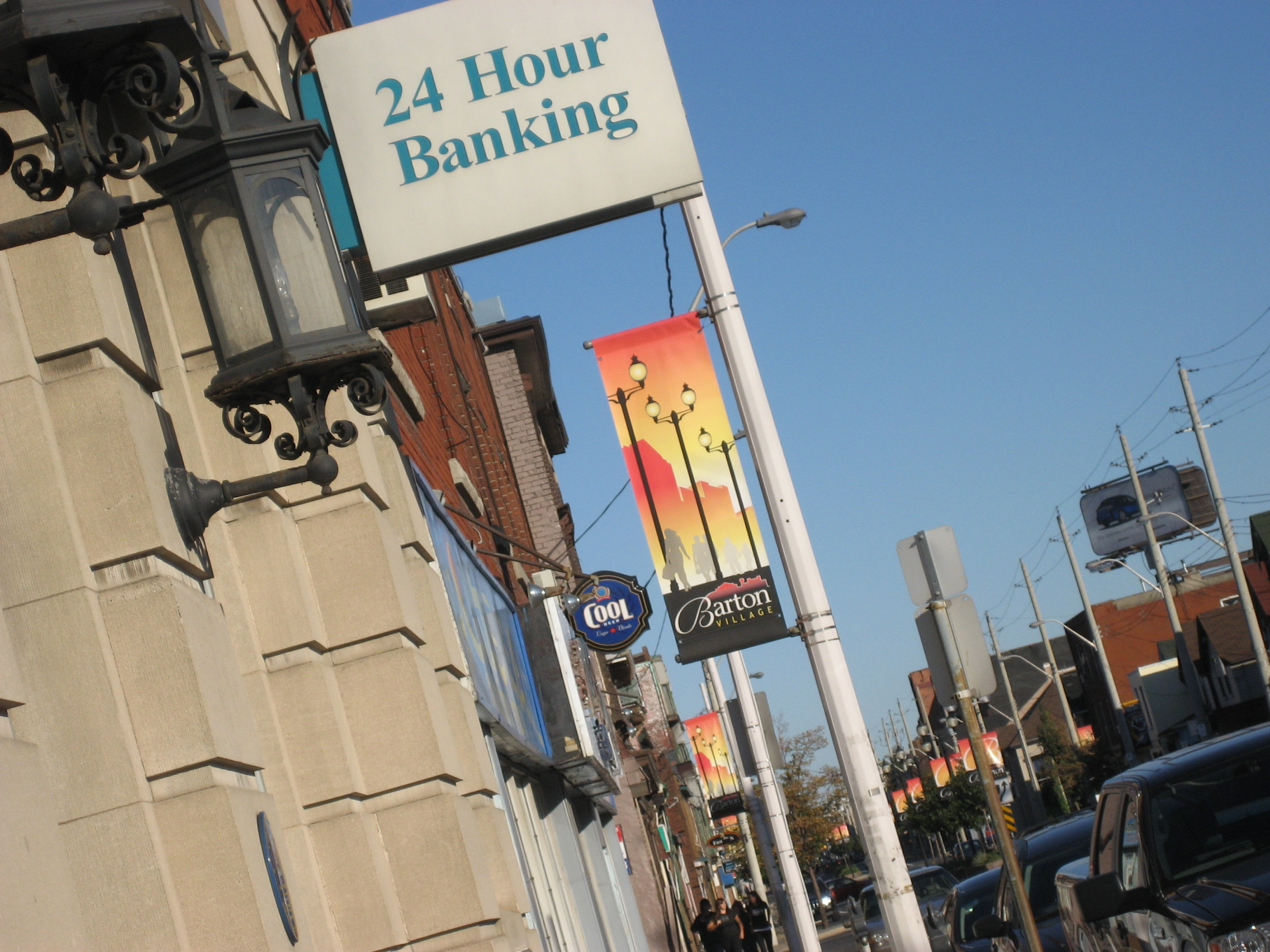
Barton Street East

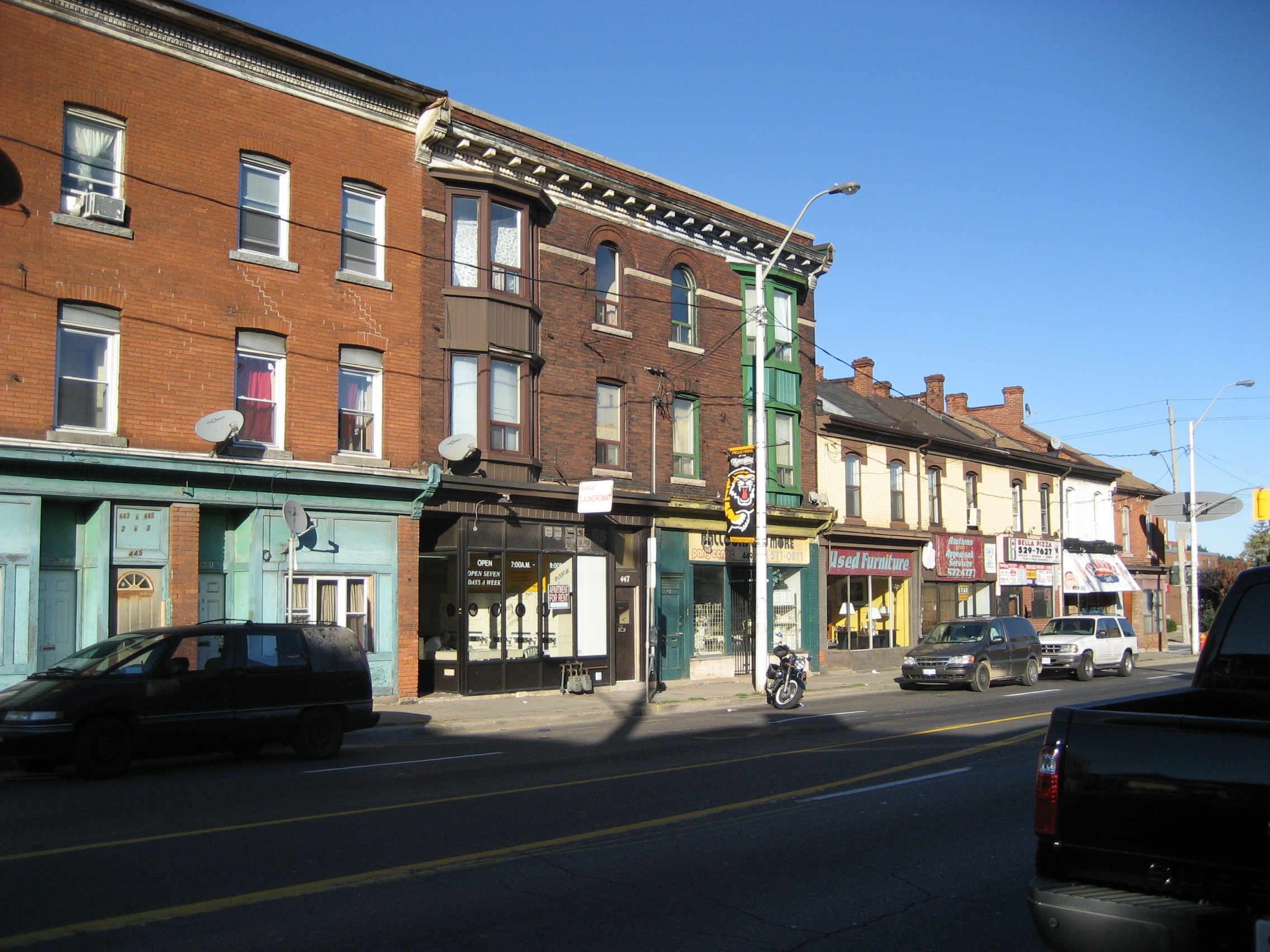
Barton Street East

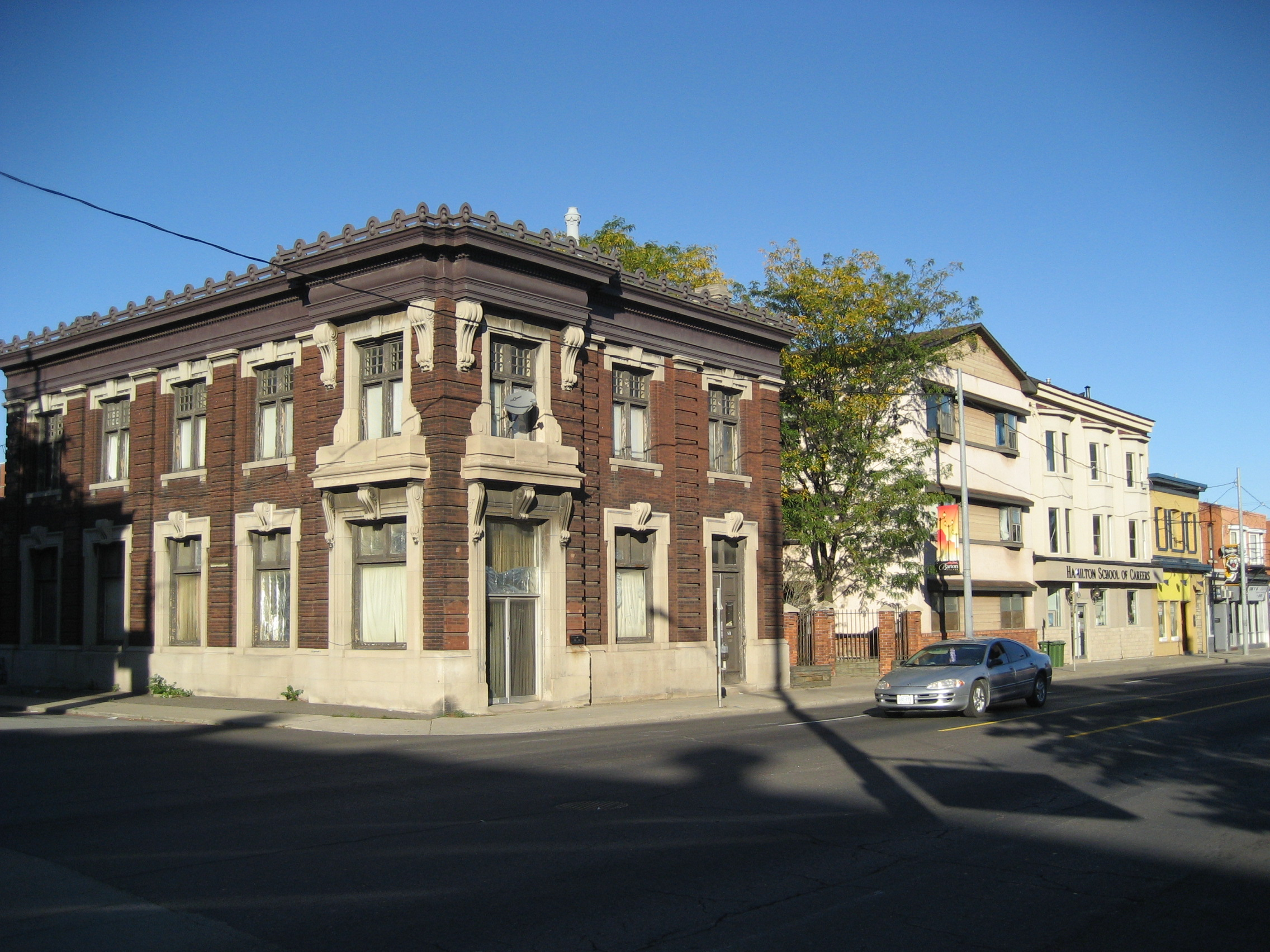
Barton Street East

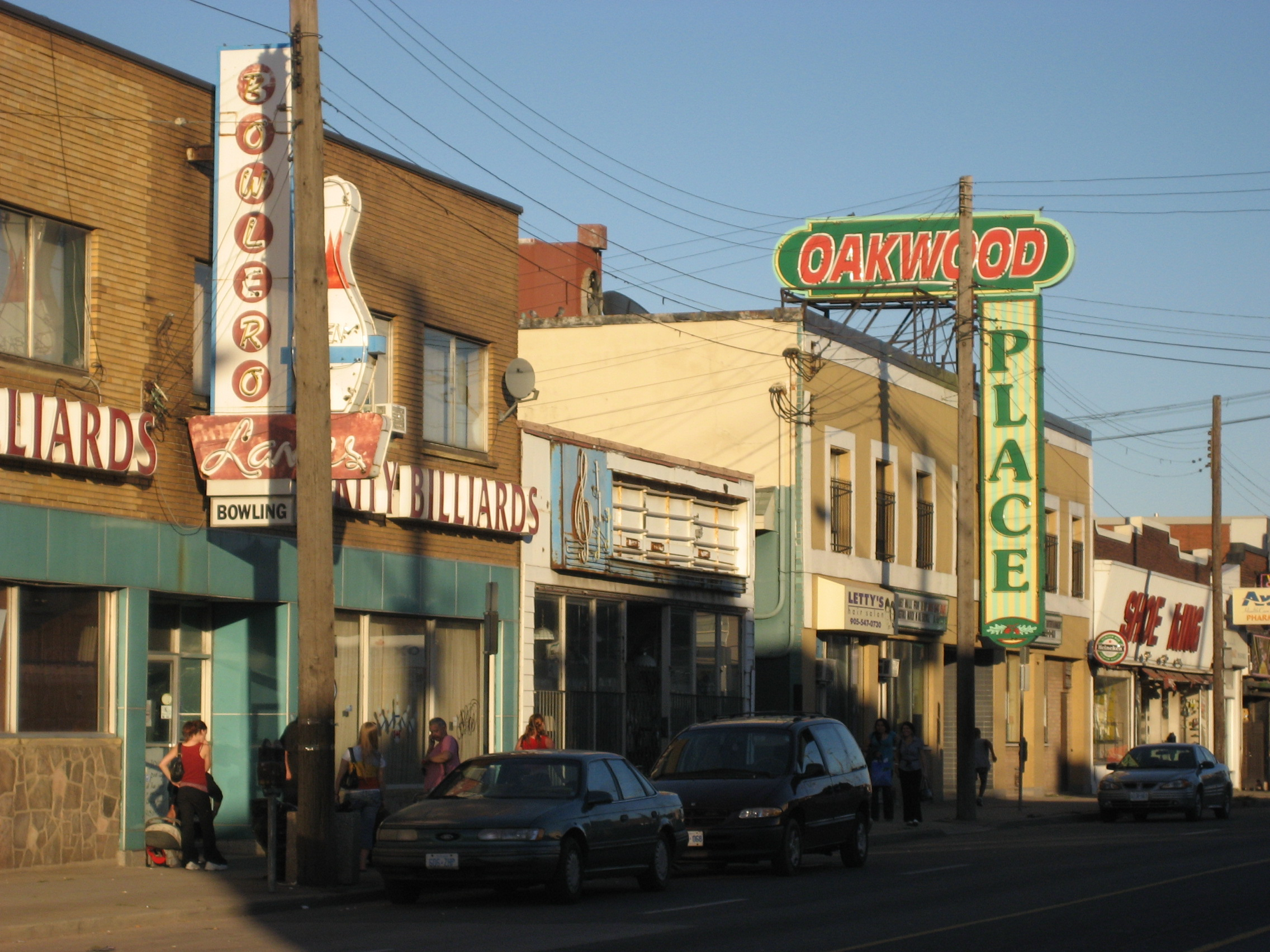
Barton Street East

== Landmarks ==
Note: listing of landmarks from west to east.

- Rheem Canada building (Demolished Feb 2012)
- Barton Street Hill
- Jamesville, which is shared by the Italian & Portuguese communities of Hamilton
- James North Art District
- site of the old Hanrahan's Hotel, now a strip club called "Hamilton Strip".
- Hamilton-Wentworth Detention Centre
- Hamilton General Hospital
- Kennesky Sports & Cycle Co. Ltd.
- Woodlands Park
  - Site of the old Barton Street Arena, across the street from Woodlands Park, now a row of houses.
- Former Canadian Westinghouse headquarters building (1903–1997), just north of Barton Street.
- Mohawk College - Wentworth campus
- St. Ann's Catholic Church
- Ukrainian Orthodox Cathedral of St. Vladimir
- St. Stanislaw Kostka Polish Roman Catholic Church
- Holy Spirit Church
- Stadium Mall
- Centre Mall, site of the former Jockey Club / Racetrack before mall was built
- Ottawa Street Shopping District - "Textile District"
- East Hamilton Radio
- Slovak Assumption Byzantine Catholic Church
- Strathbarton Mall
- Coca-Cola bottling company
- Mahony Park
- Hamilton Doublerink Arena (2 rinks)
- Canada's First Lowe's Home Improvement Warehouse
- Red Hill Creek Valley
- Red Hill Valley Trail
- Red Hill Creek
- Red Hill Valley Parkway, flows underneath Barton Street overpass.
- Red Hill Creek Centre
- Eastlawn Cemetery
- Comfort Inn motel
- Parkway Plaza (shopping)
- Mountainview Public School
- County Market (Stoney Creek)
- Winona Park / Winona Scout Hall
- Rice Monuments Works

== Communities ==
Note: Listing of neighbourhoods from West to East.

- Strathcona
- Central - The financial center of Hamilton, Ontario
- Beasley
- Landsdale
- Gibson
- Sanford
- Stipeley
- Crown Point West
- Crown Point East
- Homeside
- Normanhurst
- McQuesten West
- McQuesten East
- Parkview West
- Parkview East
- Nashdale/ Kentley, Barton cuts through these two neighbourhoods.
- Lakely/ Riverdale West, Barton cuts through these two neighbourhoods.
- Grayside/ Riverdale East, Barton cuts through these two neighbourhoods.
- Fruitland
- Winona
- Stoney Creek

== Images ==
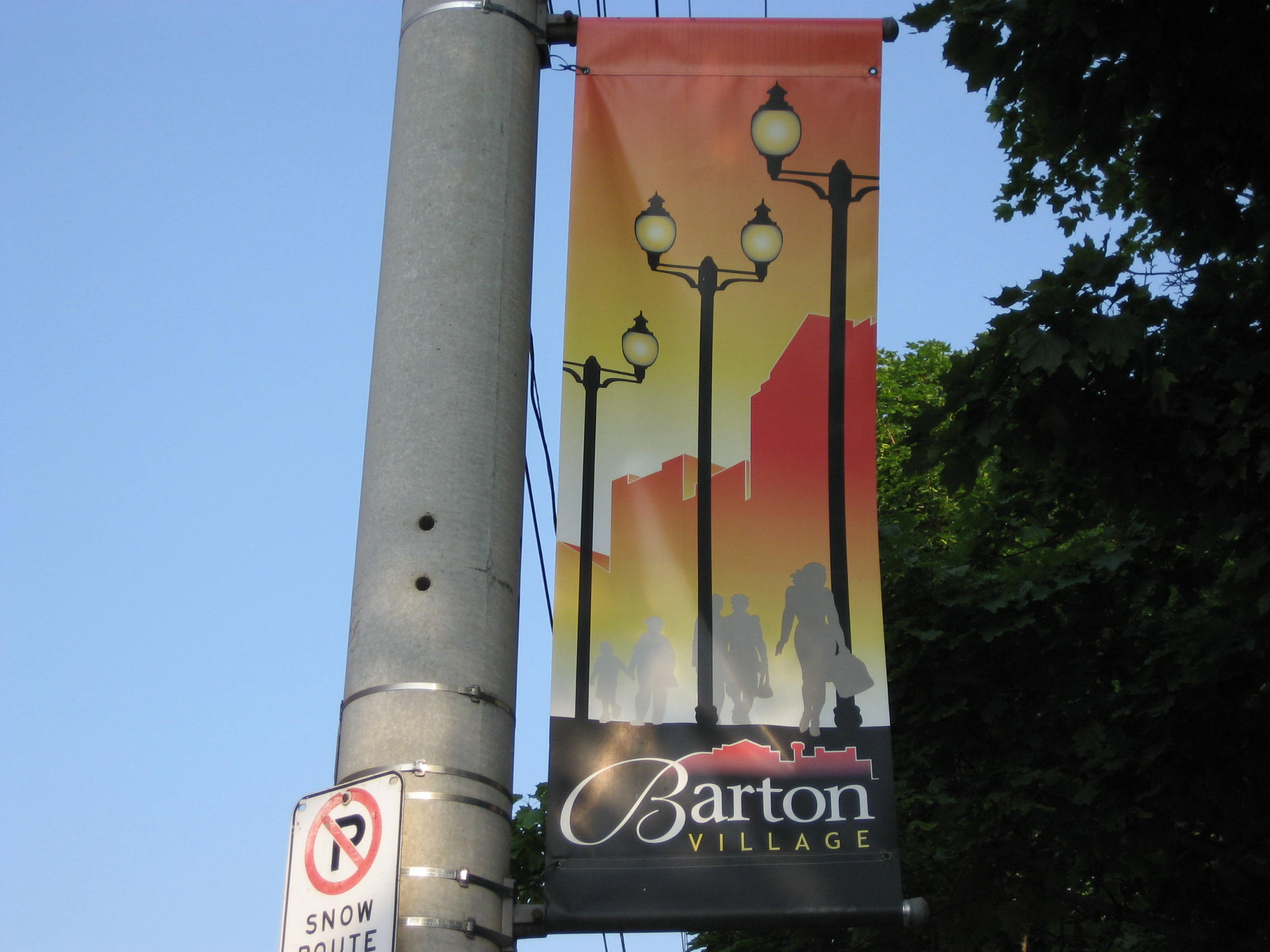
Barton Street banner

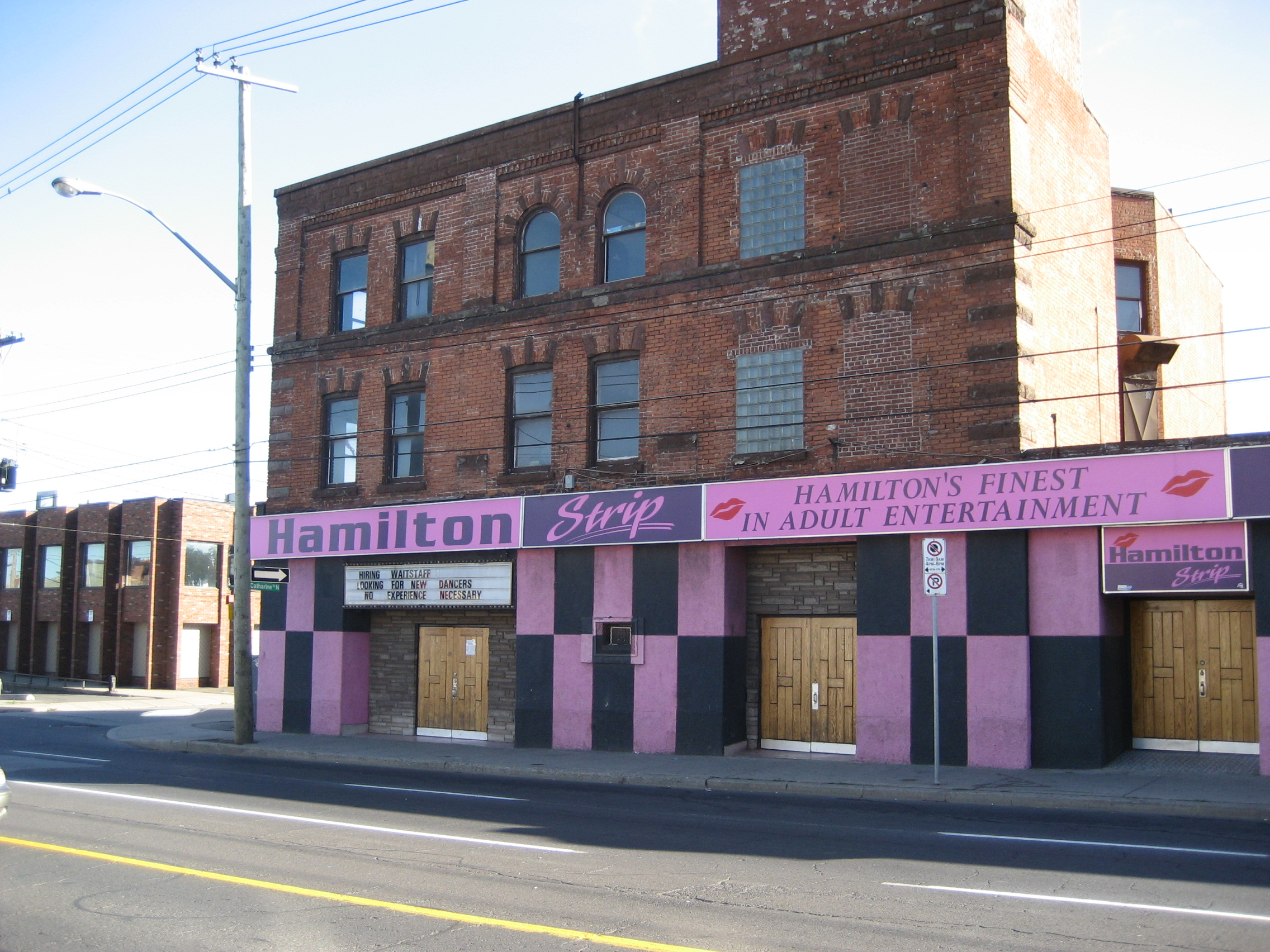
Barton Street East

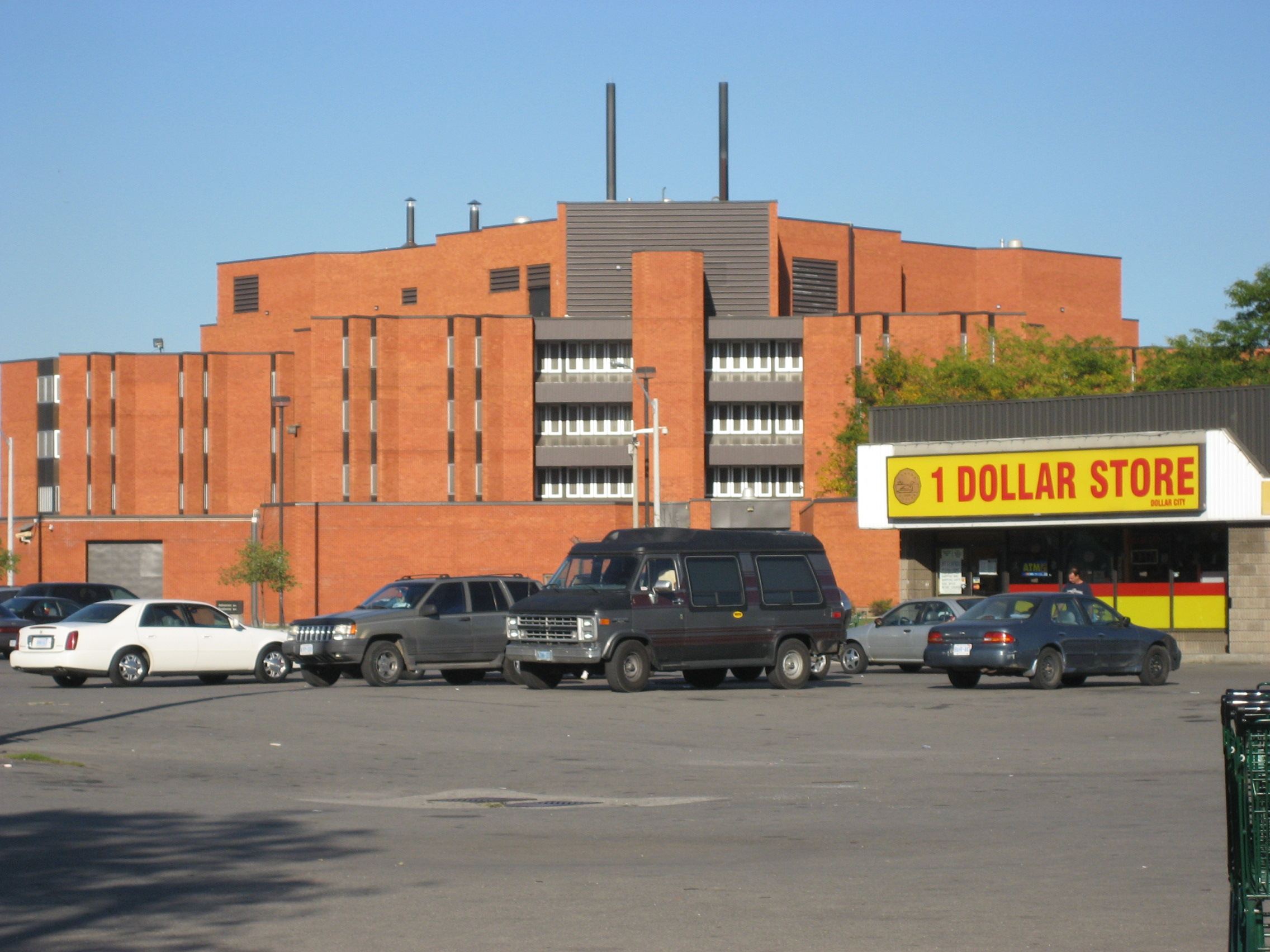
Hamilton-Wentworth Detention Centre

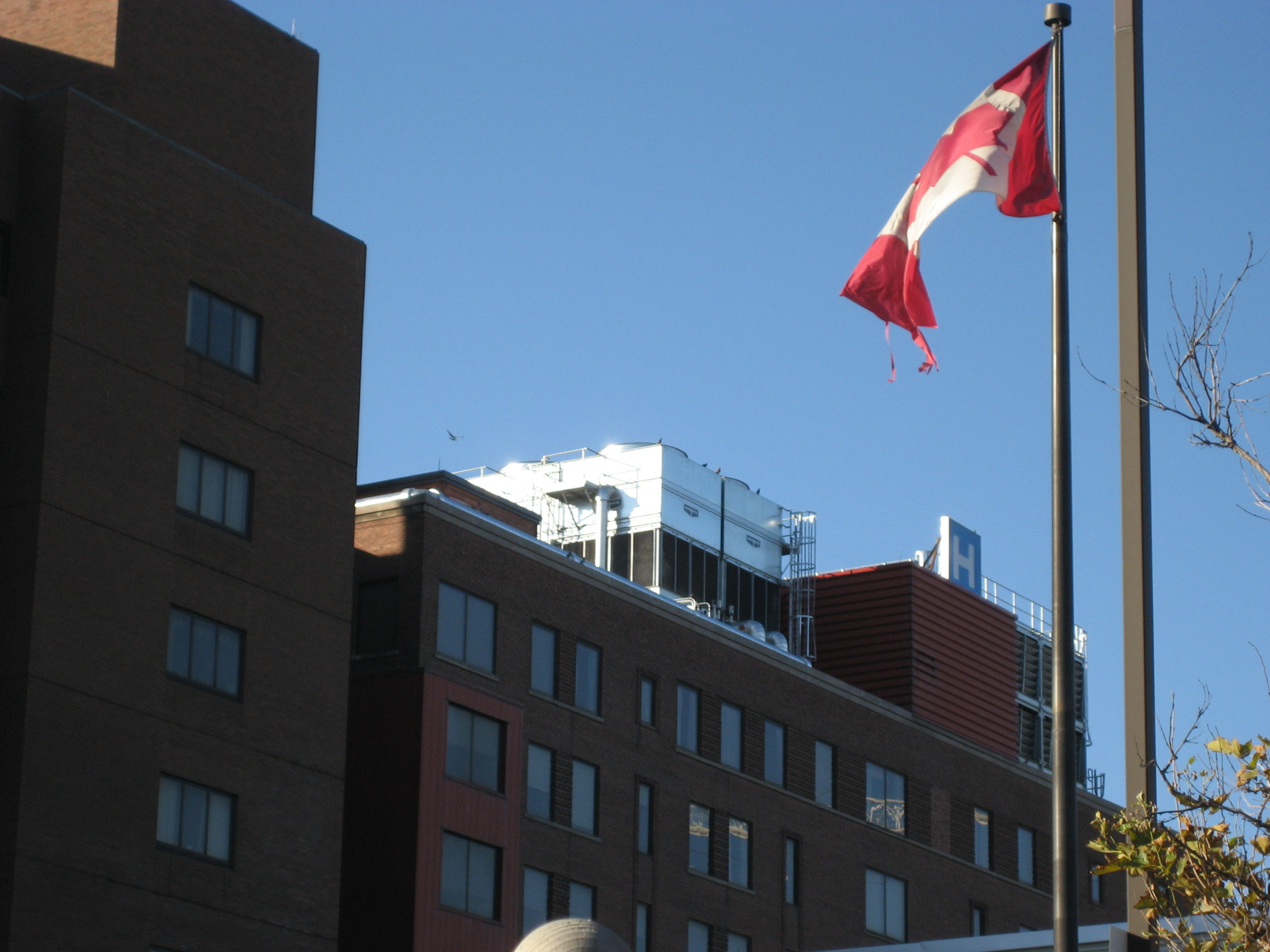
Hamilton General Hospital

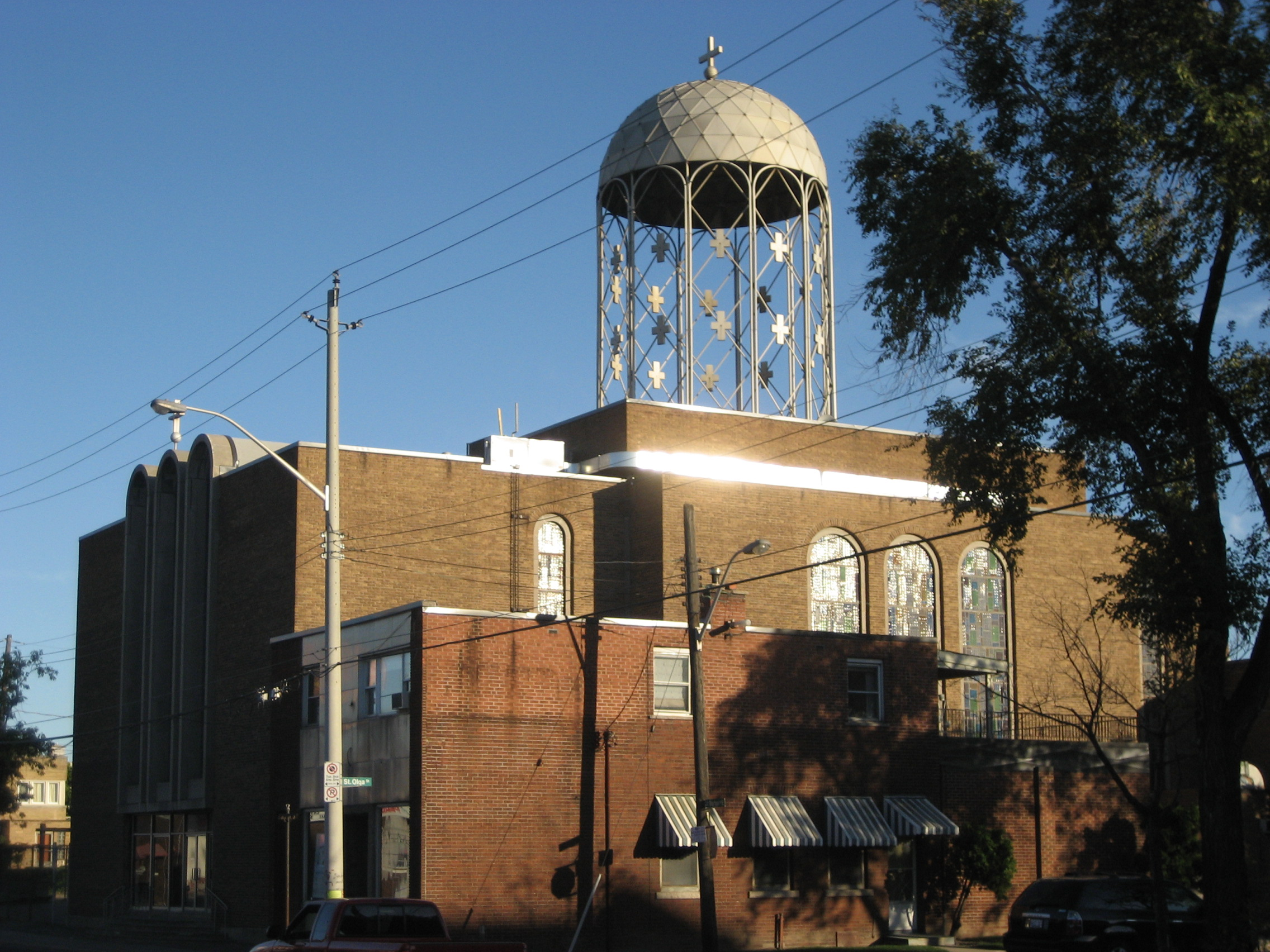
Holy Spirit Church

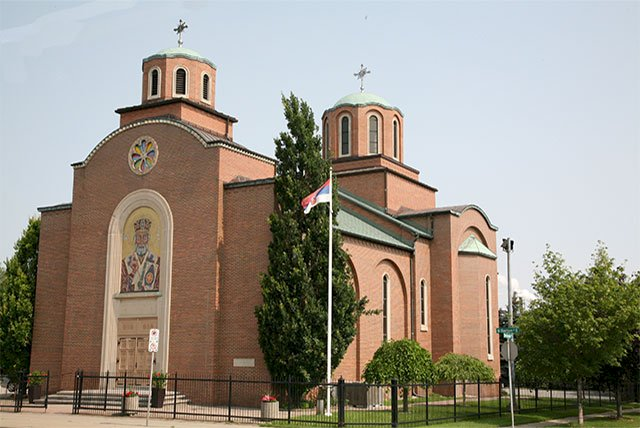
Saint Nicholas Serbian Orthodox Church
