= The Centre on Barton =

Coordinates: 43.252°N 79.810°W

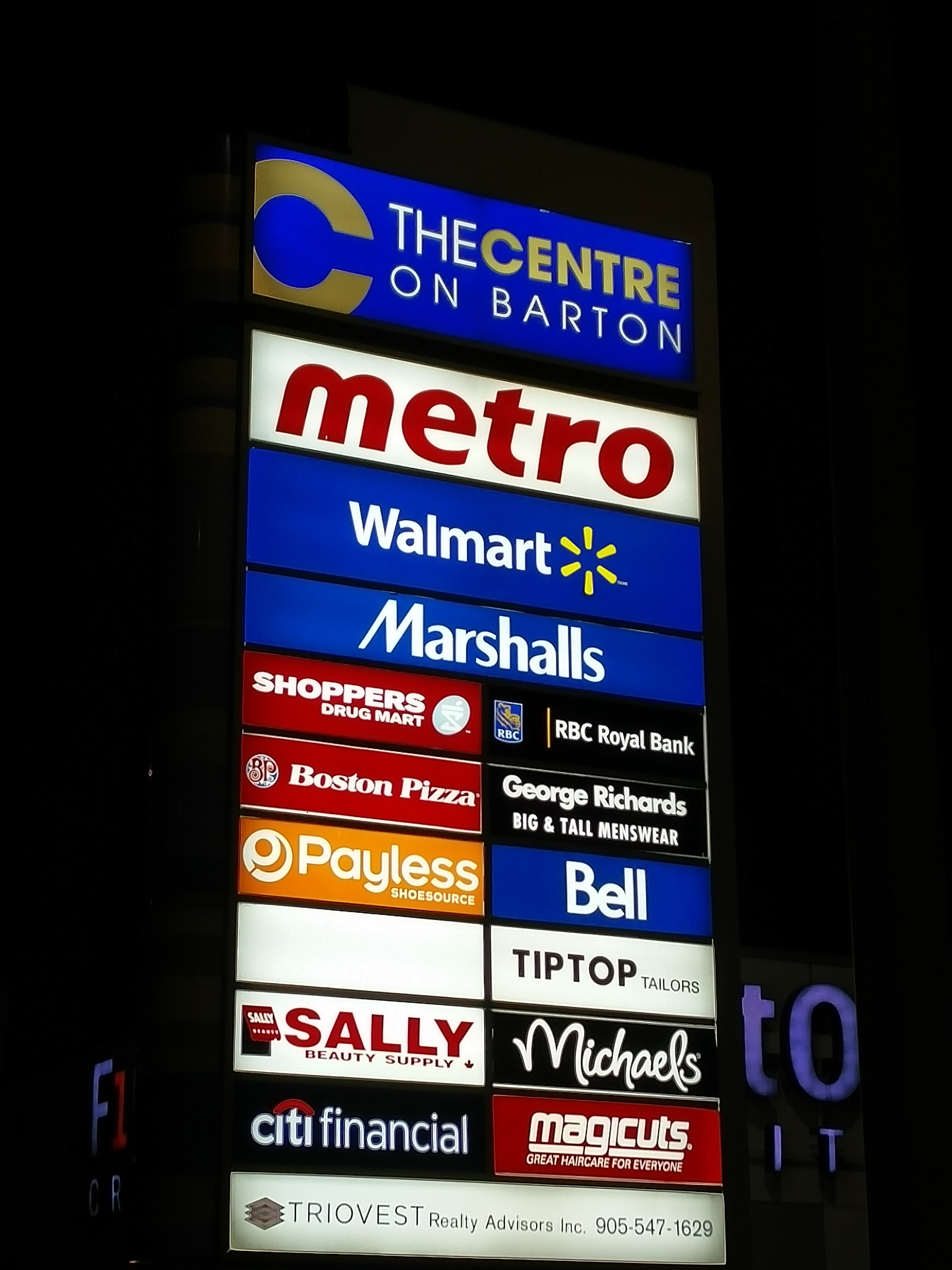
- Sign for the Mall
- Location: 1275 Barton Street East; Hamilton, Ontario; L8H 2V4
- Opened: 1955

The Centre on Barton is an outdoor shopping centre in the Lower City of Hamilton, Ontario, Canada. The centre is located on Barton Street East bounded by Ottawa Street North in the western-end and Kenilworth Avenue North on the eastern-end. It was formerly known as the Centre Mall and before that, the Greater Hamilton Shopping Centre. It was a "plaza" for many years before being closed in as a "mall" and access to the stores was available through a front and back door of the plaza. In 2008, the mall was rebuilt back to an outdoor shopping centre. Some long time residents were not happy about the change from an indoor mall to an outdoor plaza, complaining that in the winter they now have to go outside to get from store to store, and navigating from store to store more difficult in general year round.

== History ==
The Greater Hamilton Shopping Centre was built in 1955 and was one of the first shopping malls in North America. Before the 2008 reconstruction project, the mall had 1 floor (two of the anchor tenants had 2 floors).

The present-day Centre on Barton used to be the site of the Hamilton Jockey Club Racetrack but in the years after the Second World War the push for Hamilton's eastward expansion had completely engulfed the Jockey Club property. On September 26, 1952, the racetrack was sold. The site then became the Greater Hamilton Shopping Centre.

== 2008 Reconstruction project ==
The Centre Mall owners announced the plans for a 23-building power centre, named The Centre on Barton, on the property of Barton Street East. The cost had originally been estimated to be around the $100-million mark and the project eventually took up 700,000 square feet (65,000 m^{2}) of retail space. This was the largest redevelopment project in the history of Hamilton's east-end. The buildings on the property are grouped around the edge of the property and create a pedestrian-oriented design rather than a commercial island in a sea of parking. The overhaul roughly took about two-and-a-half years to complete but the bulk of the work had been done by the end of the summer of 2008. Some new buildings were completed before the enclosed mall was torn down.

The redevelopment of Centre Mall transformed the entire neighbourhood from Ottawa Street to Kenilworth Avenue. The $100-million investment in the mall boosted Ottawa Street North – already the city's No.1 tourist destination. The garment district became a holistic home decor destination area, with lighting, antique, design & glass stores. The Ottawa Street Business Improvement Area had the most applications and grants under the commercial property improvement program in 2007 with 33, and it had an effect on the property values and real estate activity in the district.
