= Kenilworth Avenue (Hamilton, Ontario) =

Lower City arterial road in Hamilton, Ontario, Canada

Coordinates: 43.2499°N 79.8059°W

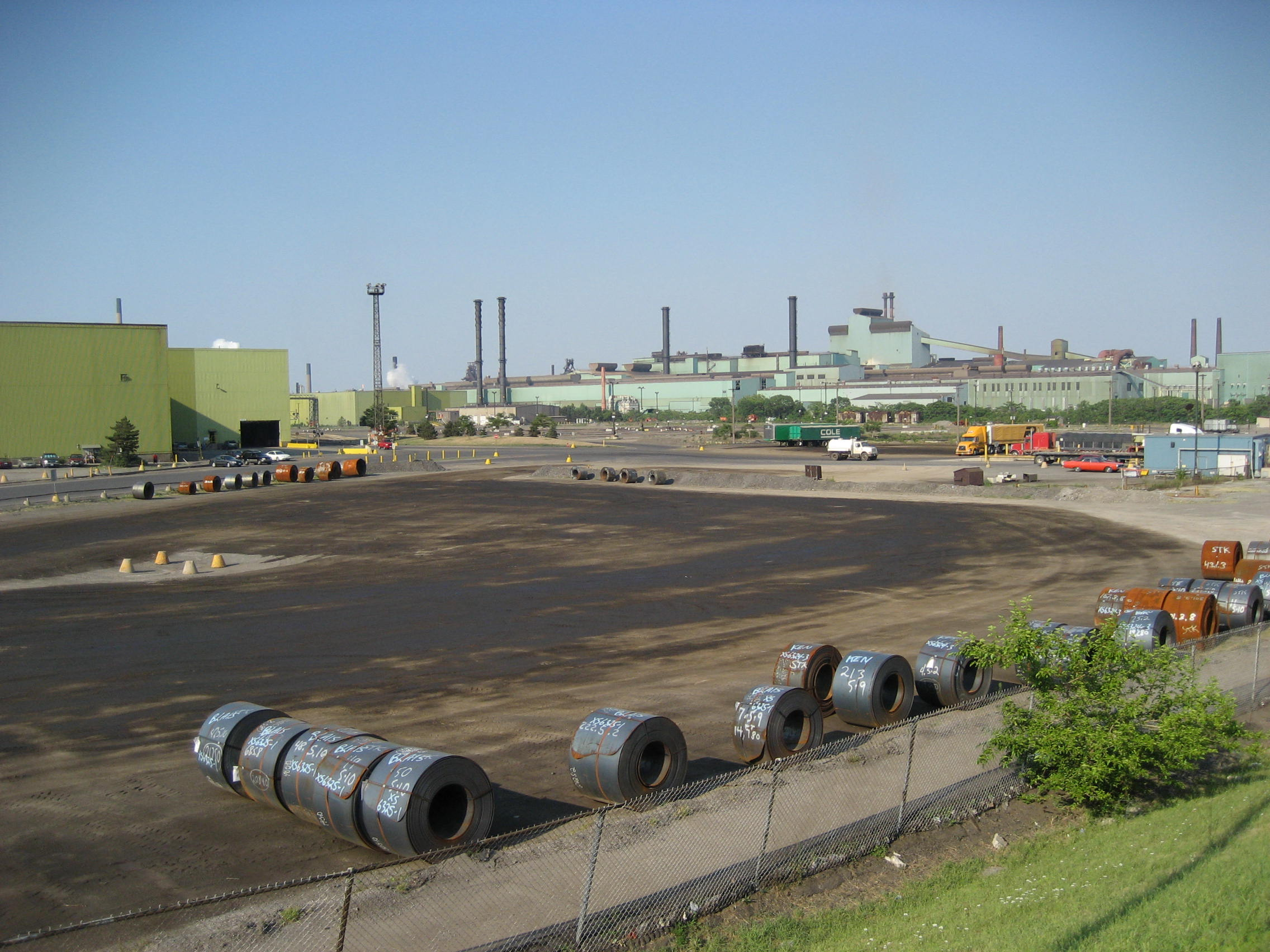
Dofasco, steel company

Kenilworth Avenue is a Lower City arterial road in Hamilton, Ontario, Canada. It starts off at the Kenilworth Traffic Circle and Kenilworth Access, a mountain-access road at the base of the Niagara Escarpment (mountain) and is a two-way street throughout stretching northward through the city's North End industrial neighbourhood where it then flows underneath the Burlington Street bridge and right into Dofasco's (steel company) Industrial Park.

== History ==
Dominion Steel Casting Company (Dofasco) established in 1912. Later named Dominion Foundries and Steel, the company merged with its subsidiary, Hamilton Steel Wheel Company in 1917. The name was officially changed to Dofasco Inc. in 1980. In 1912, National Steel Car is established in Hamilton. Builders of reliable freight and passenger train cars and equipment. Also by 1912, with 4.5 miles (7.2 km) of dockage, Hamilton is second only to Montreal in shipping.

Firestone Tire and Rubber Company of Canada (1919–1988) was based just east of Kenilworth Avenue North on Burlington Street with neighbouring National Steel Car on its left.

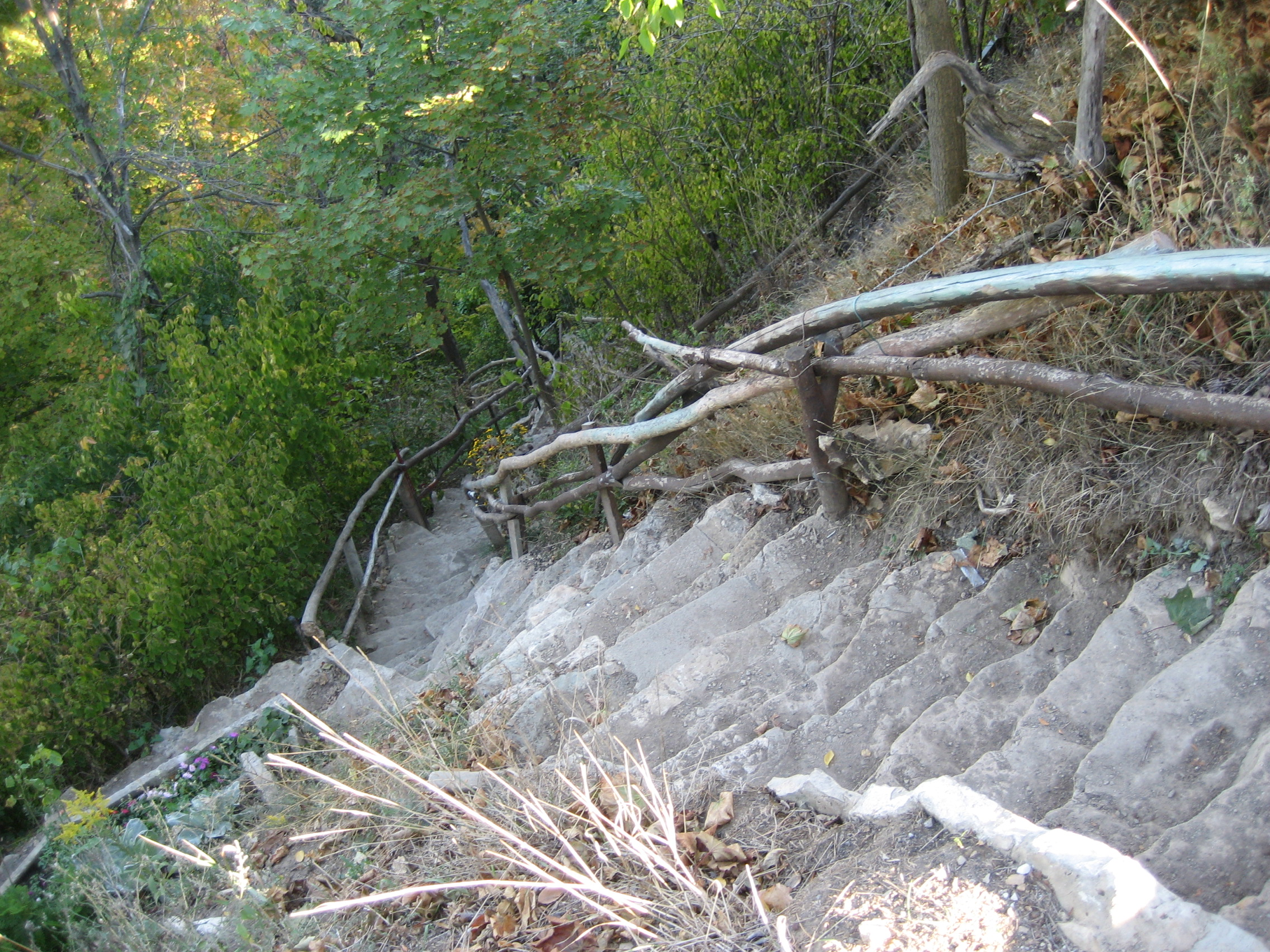
Uli's Stairs, connecting Mountain Brow to the Rail Trail

Uli's Stairs are stone steps that connect the mountain brow to the Rail Trail. They were made by a local man named Ulrich, otherwise known as Uli. The city sees his steps as a risk to public safety. The city has a set of steps made of steel nearby at the end of Kimberly Drive near Kenilworth Avenue that go from the lower city to the Escarpment Rail Trail and the Bruce Trail, and another set of stairs a few hundred feet east of those connecting the Rail Trail and the Mountain Brow at Margate Avenue.

The Bruce Trail cuts through the city along the Niagara Escarpment (mountain) and used by many locals for a full day's hike. The trail is 430 miles (690 km) long and starts at Niagara Falls, passes through Hamilton and ends at the Bruce Peninsula. Hikers are led to scenic gorges, hidden waterfalls and places of quiet charm.

Pier 23 is home to Lakeshore Sand, which processes foundry and glass-making sand, casting and water filtration sand, and bunker sand supplied to nearly 40 area golf courses.

== Landmarks ==
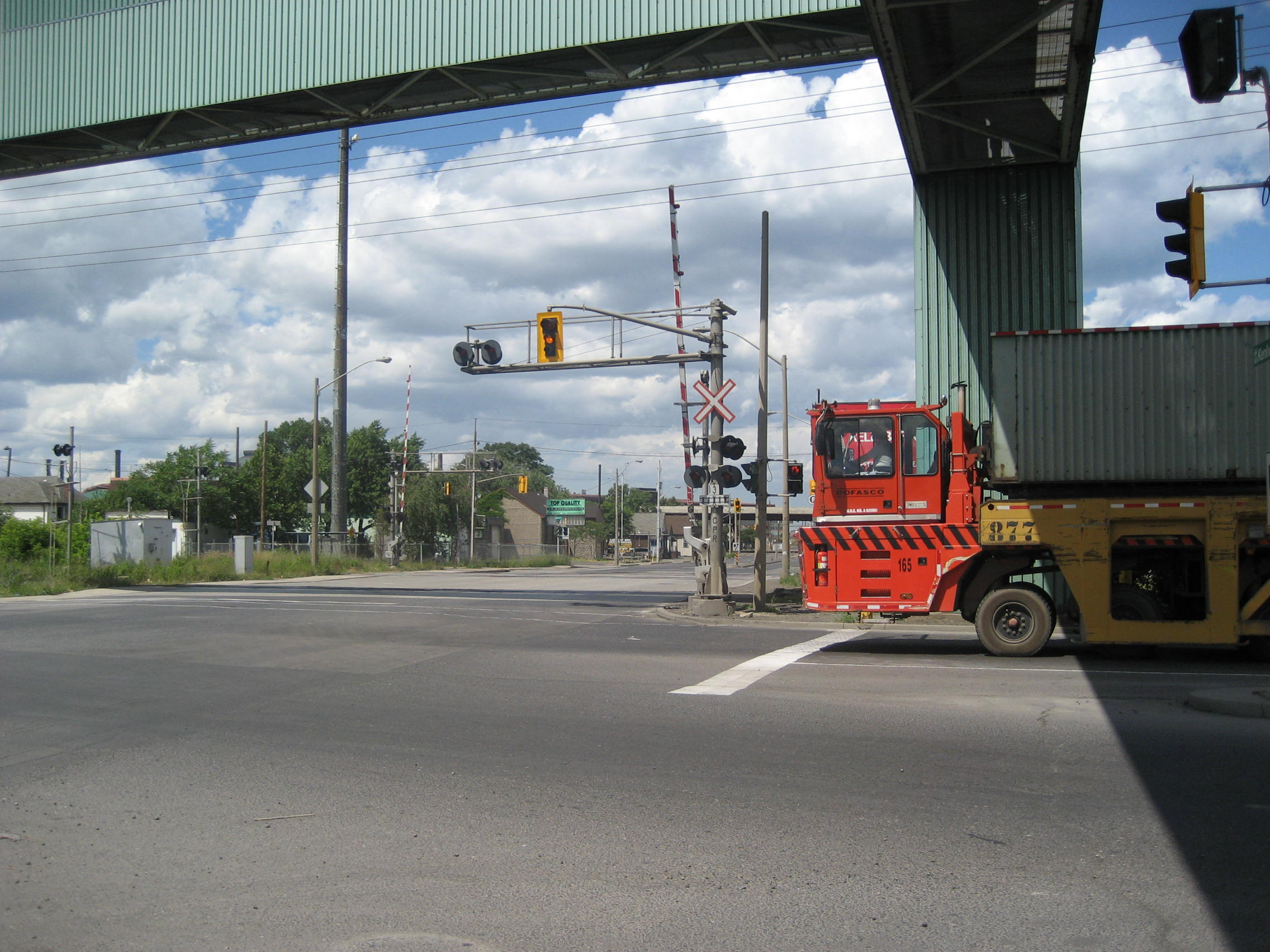
Kenilworth North, leading into Dofasco

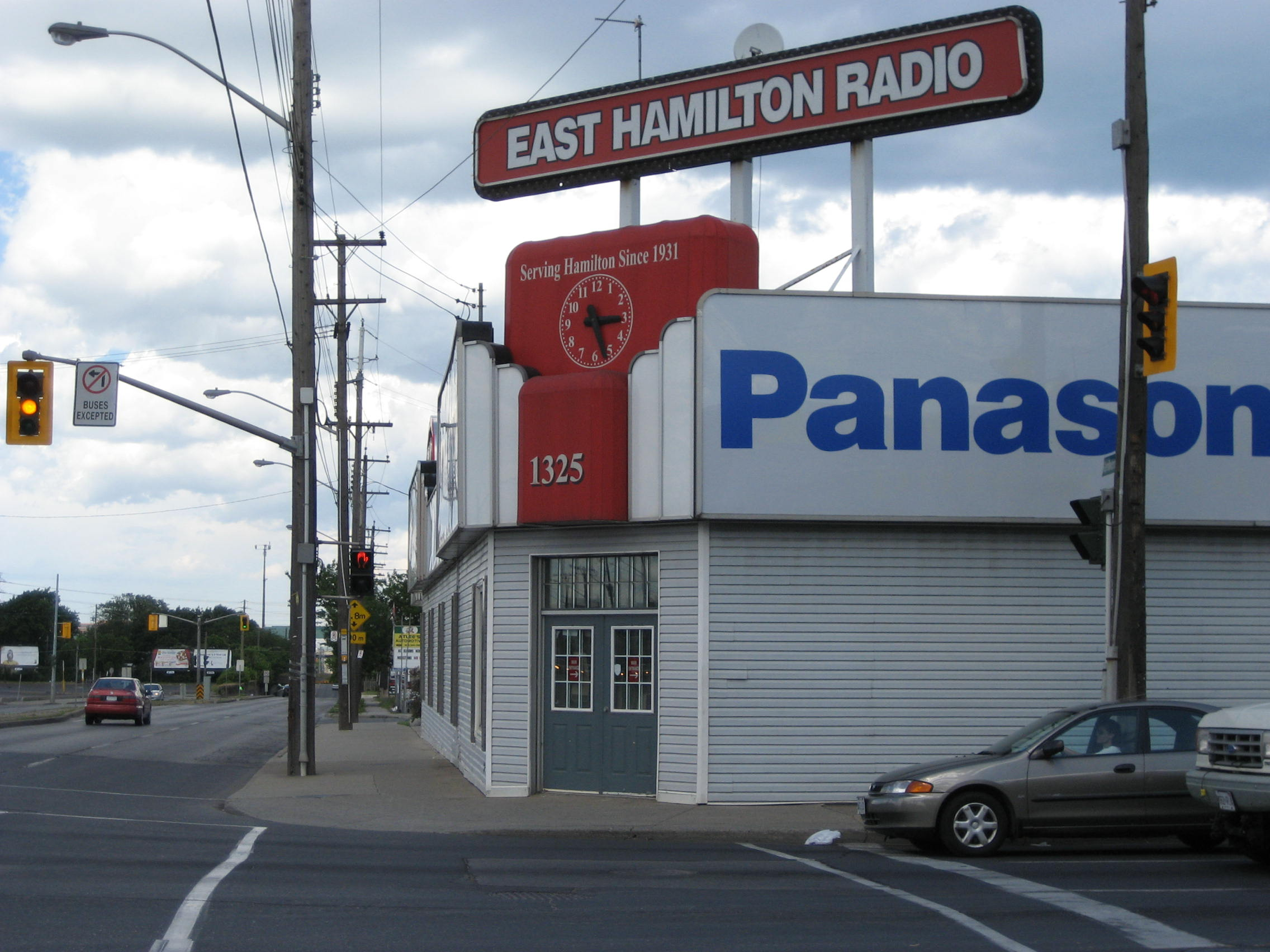
East Hamilton Radio Building

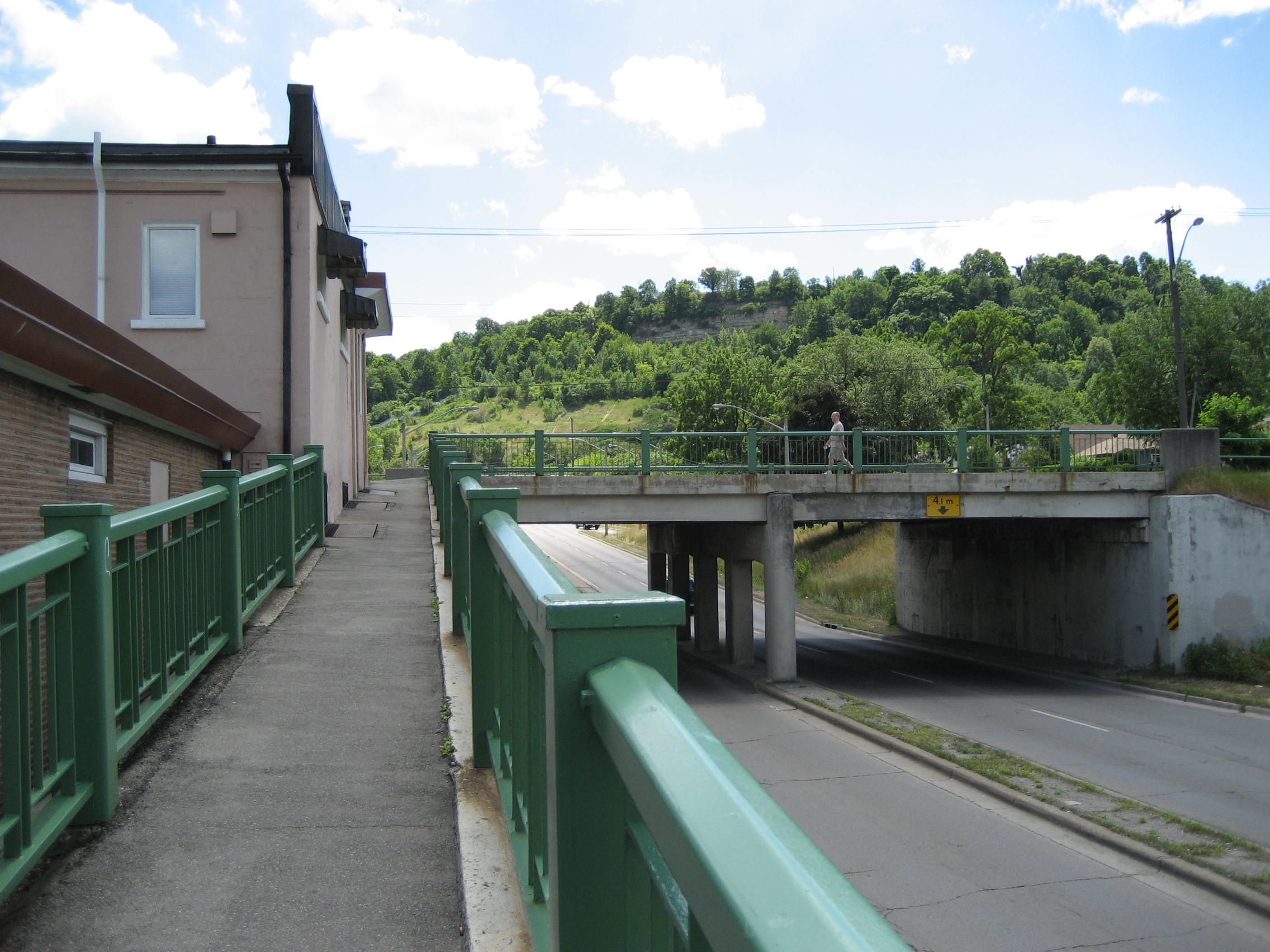
Kenilworth Avenue South at King Street East overpass

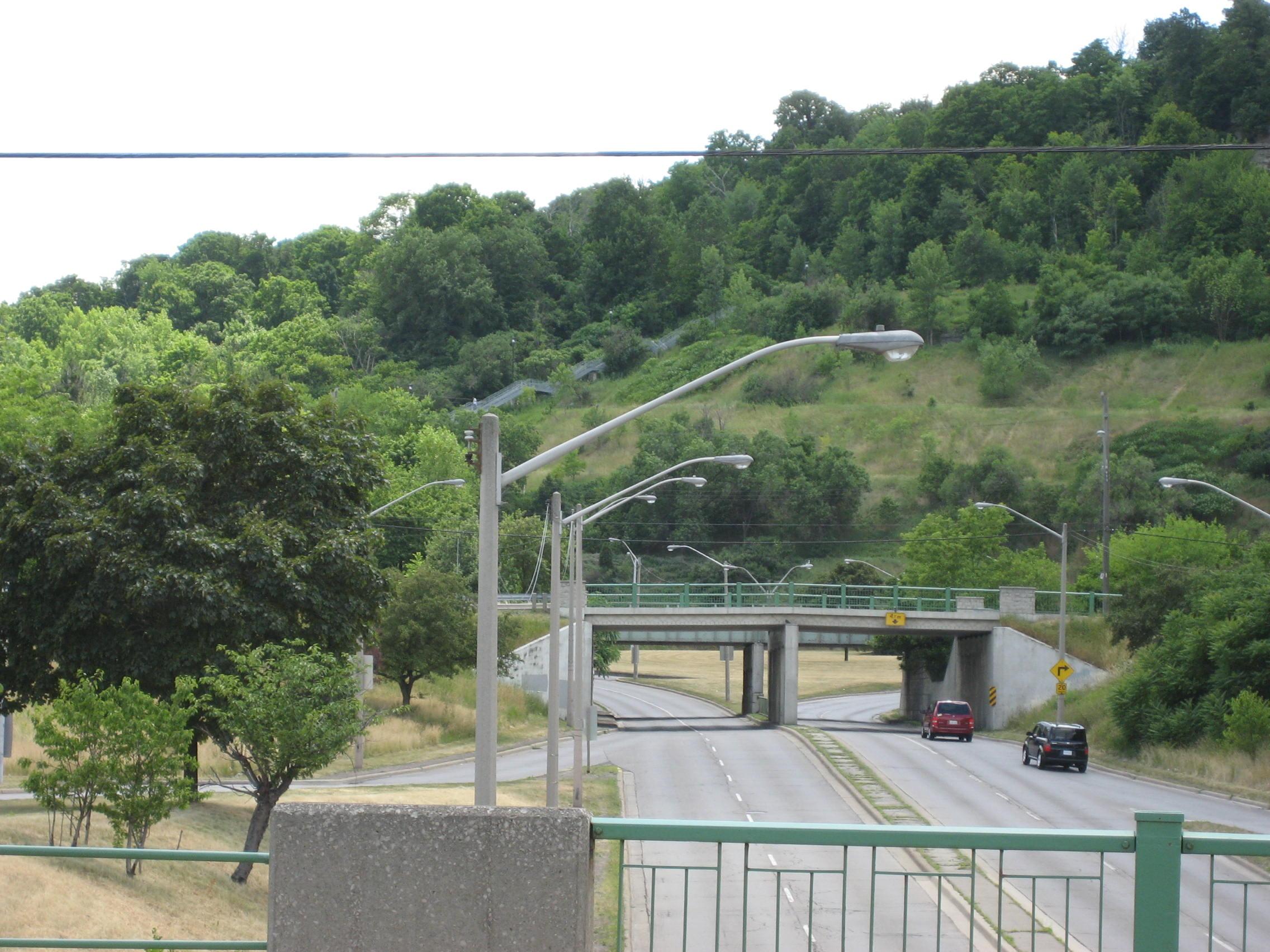
Kenilworth Avenue South

Note: Listing of landmarks from north to south

- Piers 21, 22, 23
- Dofasco (steel company)
- National Steel Car (builders of railway cars)
- Lakeshore Sand Company
- Canadian National railway bridge/ underpass
- Centre Mall, east end property, stretches West to Ottawa Street North (Canada's first Mall)
- East Hamilton Radio (building)
- United Steelworkers of America, Local 1005/ United Steelworkers, Local 7135
- Hamilton Hobby Specialties
- Kenilworth Traffic Circle
- Kenilworth stairs, at end of Kimberly Drive, 229 steps to the Rail Trail.
- Escarpment Rail Trail (abandoned railway path)
- Uli's Stairs, (305 stone steps), from Rail Trail up to the mountain brow (near Margate Avenue), connecting lower Hamilton to the Upper City.
- Bruce Trail
- Mountain Face Park
- Niagara Escarpment (mountain)

== Communities ==
Note: Listing of neighbourhoods from north to south

- North End - Everything north of the Canadian National Railway tracks
- Crown Point East/ Homeside, Kenilworth Avenue is the division between these two neighbourhoods.
- Delta East/ Bartonville, Kenilworth Avenue is the division between these two neighbourhood

== See also ==
- Niagara Escarpment Commission
