= Dofasco =

Canadian steel company

- Type: Subsidiary
- Industry: Steel
- Founded: 1912
- Headquarters: 1330 Burlington St E, Hamilton, Ontario
- Parent: ArcelorMittal
- Website: dofasco.arcelormittal.com

ArcelorMittal Dofasco, a subsidiary of ArcelorMittal, is a steel company based in Hamilton, Ontario, Canada. Dofasco is a standalone subsidiary of ArcelorMittal, the world's largest integrated steel producer.

== History ==
Clifton and Frank A. Sherman founded Dominion Foundries and Steel in 1912 in Hamilton, Ontario. Dofasco was incorporated as Dominion Steel Castings Company Limited in 1912, becoming Dominion Foundries and Steel Company in 1917. Sherman Mine opened in 1968 and closed in 1990. Its longtime nickname, "Dofasco," was adopted as its legal name in 1980.

Frank H. Sherman (Frank A.'s son) introduced to Dofasco and North America in 1954 the method of steel production known as basic oxygen steelmaking (BOS), thus rendering former processes obsolete because, with respect to them, the same quantity of steel from a BOS process is manufactured in one-twelfth the time. Basic oxygen steelmaking is superior to previous steelmaking methods because the oxygen pumped into the furnace limited impurities, primarily nitrogen, that previously had entered from the air used.

Dofasco's head office in Hamilton was built in 1964 and was designed by Prack & Prack.

Dofasco owned and operated a number of subsidiaries, including National Steel Car, a Hamilton-based railway freight car manufacturer, from 1962 to 1994, and Algoma Steel, from 1988 to 1991, until union and financial difficulties ultimately forced Dofasco to divest the company.

In 1990, the world economy entered into recession. Dofasco lost $900 million in three years from 1991, in addition to the write-off of $700 million when it sold Algoma. Dofasco was the owner of the Adams and Sherman iron ore mines in Northeastern Ontario until 1990 when Dofasco announced that they would be closing the mines. During the recession of the early 1990s, Dofasco made its first permanent layoffs since the Great Depression of the 1930s.

On March 12, 2025, then-prime minister-designate Mark Carney visited the Dofasco Steel Plant as a response to American tariffs on steel, as a part of the greater Canada-United States trade war.

Dofasco has won awards for being the "most sustainable manufacturing company" in North America.

=== Acquisition ===
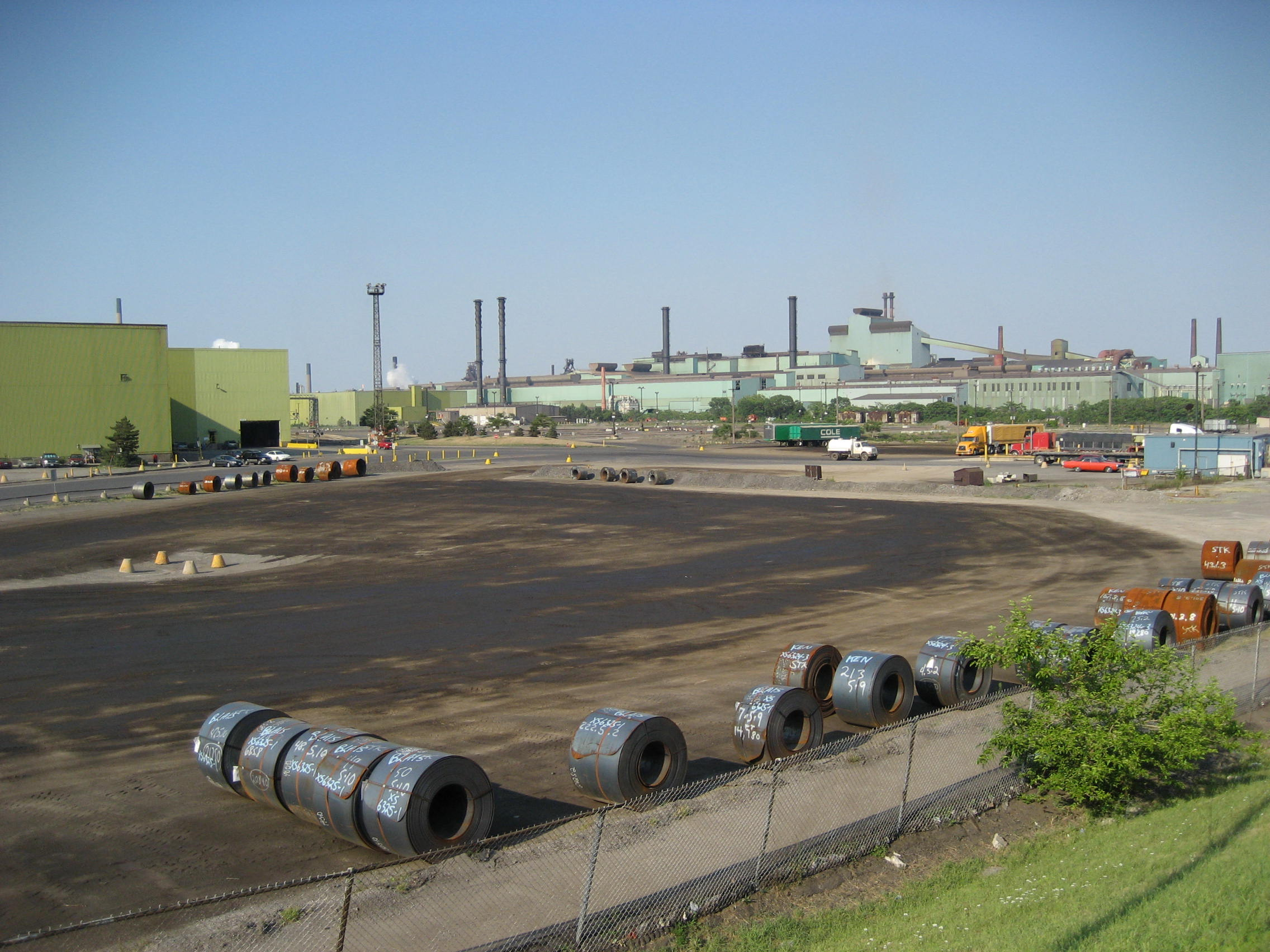
Dofasco, view from Burlington Street

In January 2006, Luxembourg-based Arcelor, then the world's second-largest steel producer by volume, outbid rival German steel producer, ThyssenKrupp AG, to purchase Dofasco. Analysts cited the strengths of Dofasco, including its non-unionized workforce, strong automotive customer base, unique thin, high-strength steel product, and ownership of a Canadian ore mine.

Dofasco's Canadian management initially didn't want to be taken over. After Arcelor initially presented a hostile bid of $56 per share, ThyssenKrupp and Dofasco signalled their intentions to enter into a friendly merger. Under that plan, Dofasco would have retained its employee profit-sharing plan and placed in charge of all of ThyssenKrupp's North American operations. Arcelor raised its offer significantly, causing ThyssenKrupp to pull out, as further bidding would have downgraded its credit rating. Dofasco paid ThyssenKrupp a breakup fee of $215 million. Dofasco's board recommended the latest Arcelor offer of $71 per share in cash, worth an estimated $5.5 billion. While the breakup fee was criticized by some as excessive, most analysts otherwise praised President and CEO Donald A. Pether and the board of directors for their successful handling of the bidding situation.

Arcelor was itself three months later taken over by the world's largest steel producer, Mittal. However, in an effort to prevent Dofasco from falling into ThyssenKrupp's hands, Arcelor management locked Dofasco into an independent trust based in the Netherlands. Dofasco is now part of the combined ArcelorMittal and has been integrated into their international operations.

== Labour relations ==
Unlike rival Stelco, Dofasco is not unionized. As a result, Dofasco has avoided many of the strikes and work stoppages which have plagued its cross-town rival. Some investors complained that the profits should have been distributed to shareholders as a special dividend rather than giving workers larger bonuses, which was a factor in the underperforming stock price despite strong results. As of January 1, 2013, Dofasco (now a standalone subsidiary) reduced the benefits for both drug and dental and changed to a defined contribution pension plan for many of its employees.

While several unsuccessful attempts have been made to organize by the United Steelworkers of America, union negotiations at Stelco may have influenced wages and benefits at Dofasco.

In 2007, Dofasco was named one of Canada's Top 100 Employers, as published in Maclean's magazine, the only steelmaker to receive this honour. The most recent win came in 2020.

Since 1937, Dofasco has annually held a large Christmas party, typically featuring 30,000 guests and a 30-foot (9 m) tree. During the early years, the party was held in one of the large mill buildings on Gage Ave. From 1993 to 2009, the party was held at Copps Coliseum. In 2010, the company moved the party to the company-owned recreation park. In 2024 the company moved the party to the Ancaster Fairgrounds.

== Pollution ==
Steelmaking in Canada has long been associated with pollution. For example, in 1989, Dofasco and Stelco were listed among the "dirty dozen" polluters in Ontario:

"For many years Steeltown's two giants pumped liquid discharges that contained cyanide, phosphorus, ammonia, solvents and phenols straight into Hamilton Harbour.... But both firms have been cleaning up to meet the terms of a pollution control order imposed on them by Queen's Park [and] the harbour is getting cleaner and supports 58 known species of fish."

In 2014, the company pleaded guilty to violating air quality standards in 2012 and paid violation and victim surcharge fines of approximately half a million dollars. In 2015, there was an accidental release of a large plume of iron oxide dust at the plant due to an instrument failure and Dofasco has been working to address air pollution

== Company slogan ==
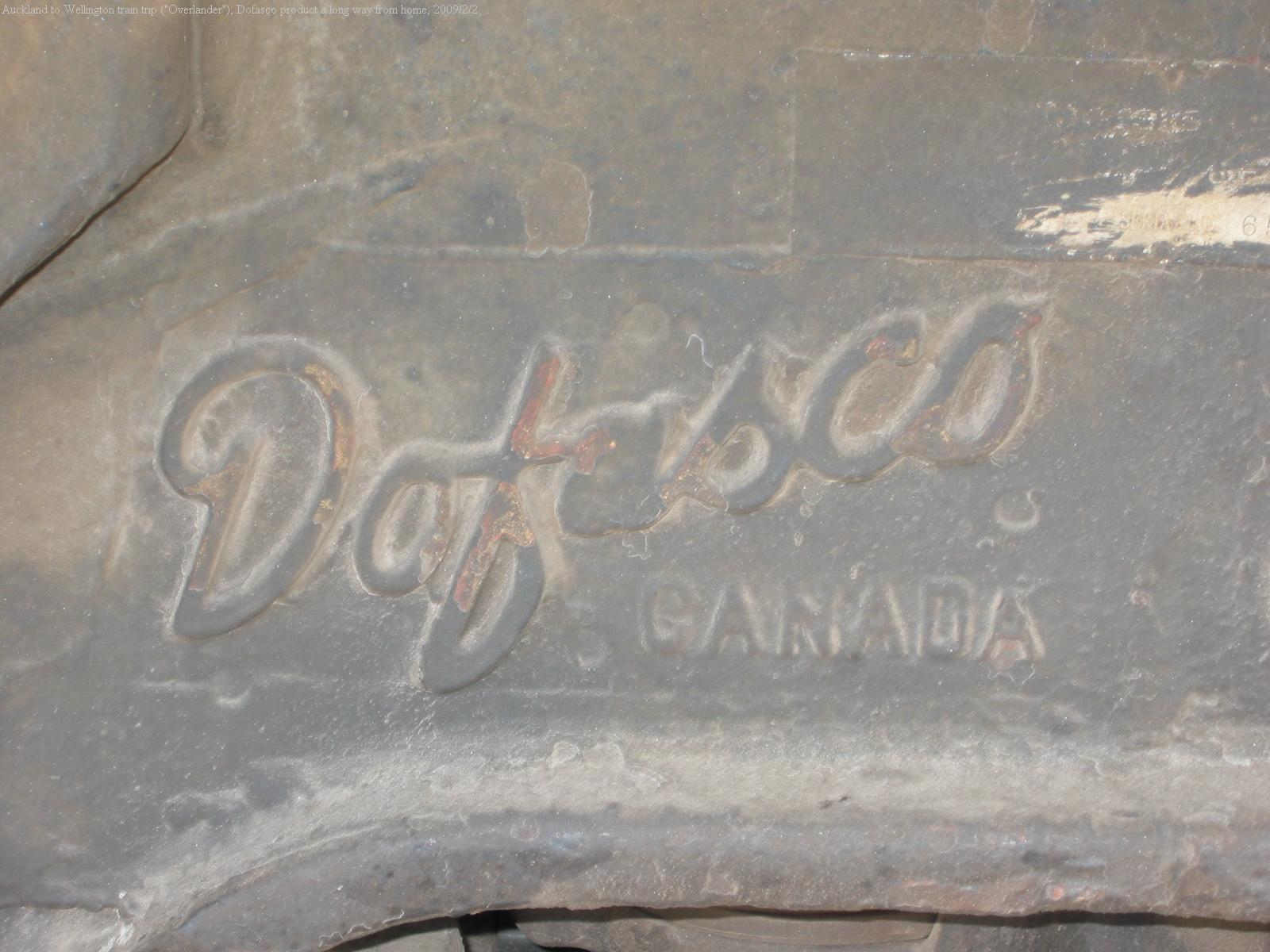
A Dofasco product—a railway locomotive bogie in New Zealand—bears the company's name and country of origin.

Since 1970, the company has used the same corporate slogan—"Our product is steel. Our strength is people."—to create what Marketing Magazine has called "one of the most clearly defined corporate images in the country." The slogan was created by Hamilton-based Kelly Advertising, which has been the company's advertising agency since 1927. The slogan can also be seen as recognizing the importance of its workforce, as the company says it has a good relationship with its employees. For a short time, the slogan contained a third line: "Our home is Hamilton."

== Leadership ==
Presidents and chairmen of Dofasco have been:

=== President ===
1. Clifton William Sherman, 1912–1945
2. Frank Albert Sherman, 1945–1953
3. Arthur George Wright, 1953–1957
4. Frederick Allen Loosley, 1957–1959
5. Frank Howard Sherman, 1959–1983
6. Paul Joseph Phoenix, 1983–1990
7. William Laurie Wallace, 1990–1992
8. John Thomas Mayberry, 1993–2002
9. Donald Allison Pether, 2003–2006
10. Jacques Chabanier, 2006–2007
11. Jürgen Günter Schachler, 2007–

=== Chairman of the board ===
1. Clifton William Sherman, 1945–1955
2. Frank Albert Sherman, 1955–1967
3. Frank Howard Sherman, 1982–1987
4. Paul Joseph Phoenix, 1991–1992
5. William Laurie Wallace, 1992
6. John Thomas Mayberry, 2002–2006
7. Donald Allison Pether, 2006
