= Cannon Street (Hamilton, Ontario) =

Road in Hamilton, Ontario, Canada

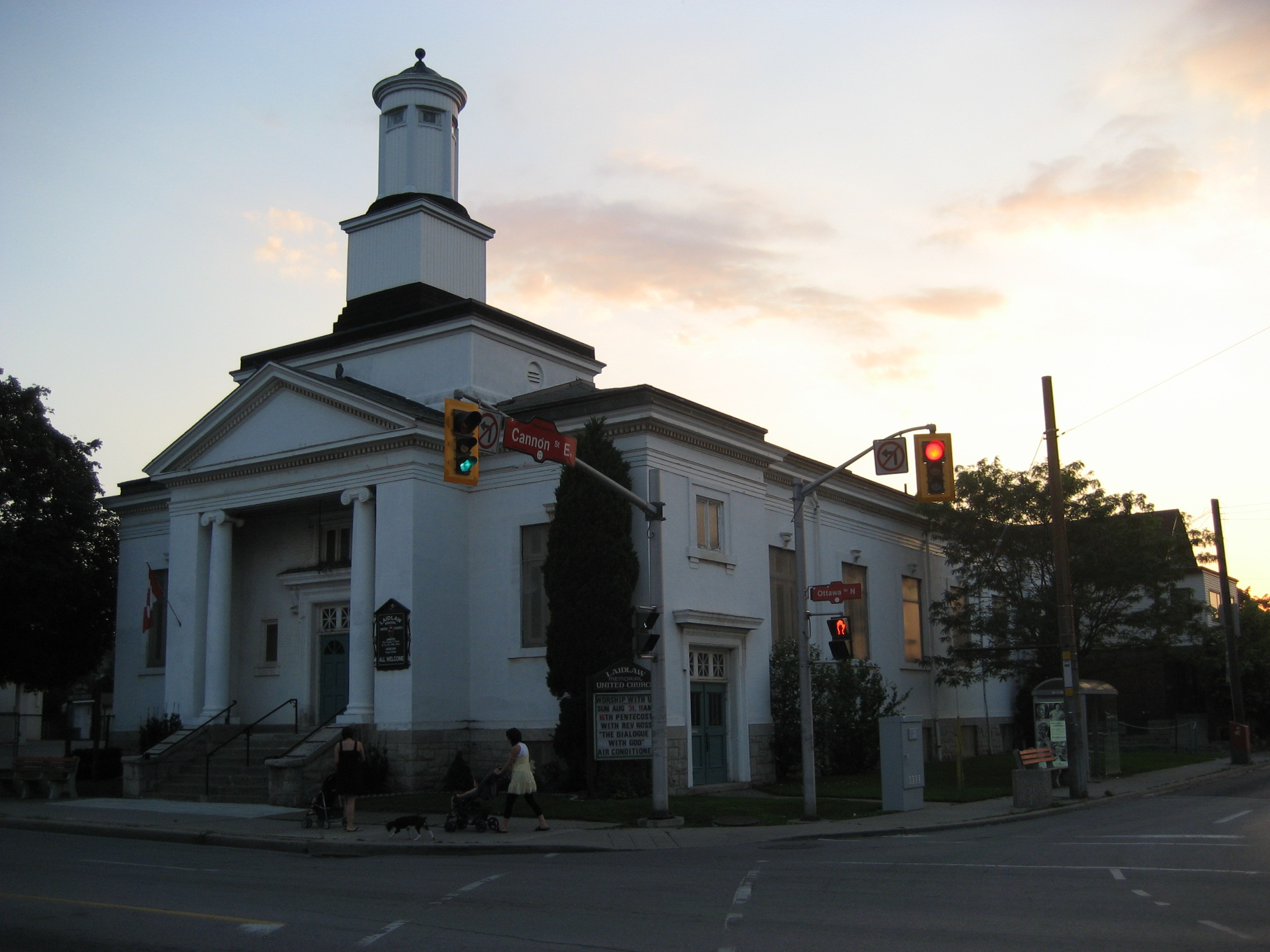
Laidlaw Memorial United Church

Cannon Street is a Lower City collector road in Hamilton, Ontario, Canada. It starts off at Queen Street North as a one-way street (Westbound) up to Sherman Avenue North where it then switches over to a two-way street the rest of the way Eastward and ends just past Kenilworth Avenue North on Barons Avenue and merges with Britannia Avenue, a street that runs parallel with Cannon Street from Ottawa Street North to Barons Avenue.

== History ==
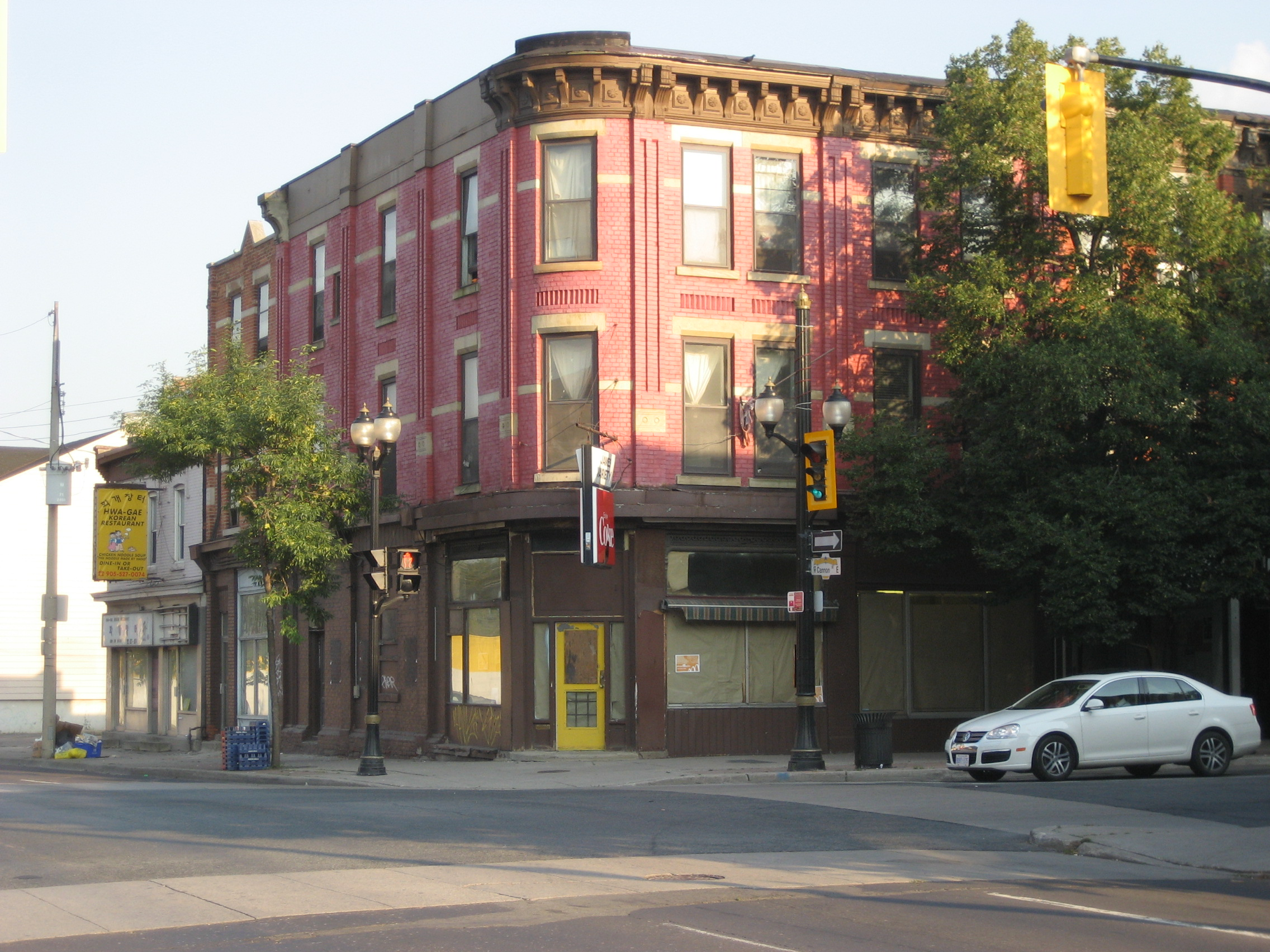
Cannon at James Street North

Cannon Street was originally called Henry Street. The section between Bay and James Streets was called Miles Street. The origins of the Cannon street name remains a mystery for local historians. Cannon Street today at Brian Timmis/ former Ivor Wynne Stadium/ Tim Horton's Field location is also known as Bernie Faloney Way which is named after the quarterback who played for the local CFL team, Hamilton Ti-Cats, between the years of 1957-64.

On 24 May 1909 a Coney Island-type amusement park was opened in Hamilton. It was known as Maple Leaf Park and was bounded by Barton Street (north), Ottawa Street (east), Cannon Street (south), Rosslyn Avenue (west). It failed to attract enough visitors to keep the gates open and only lasted a year. Investors of the Park sold the land to local real estate speculators for $25,000 interested in the property because the land itself was a valuable commodity in the booming East Hamilton market.

== Landmarks ==
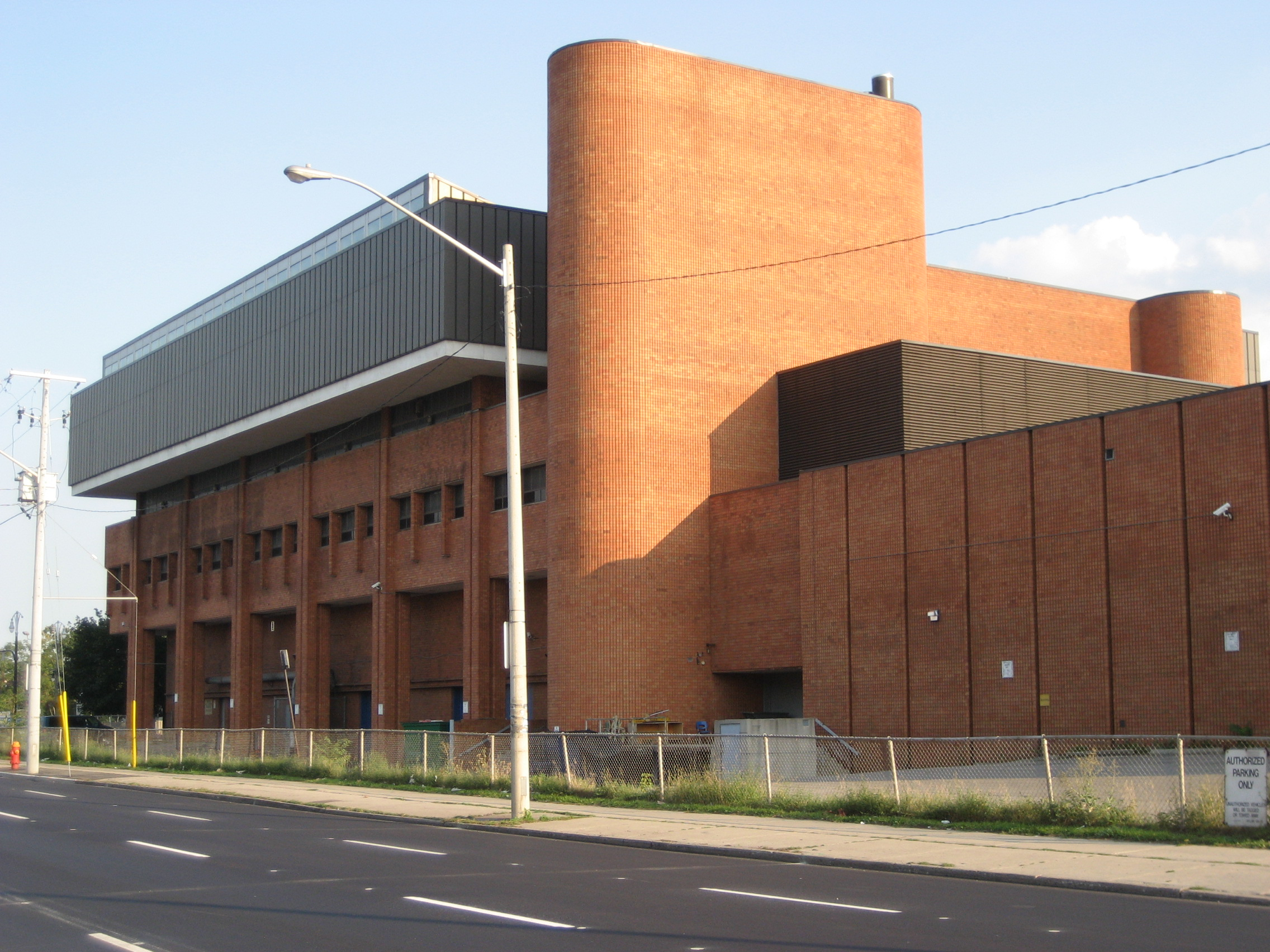
Sir John A. Macdonald Secondary School

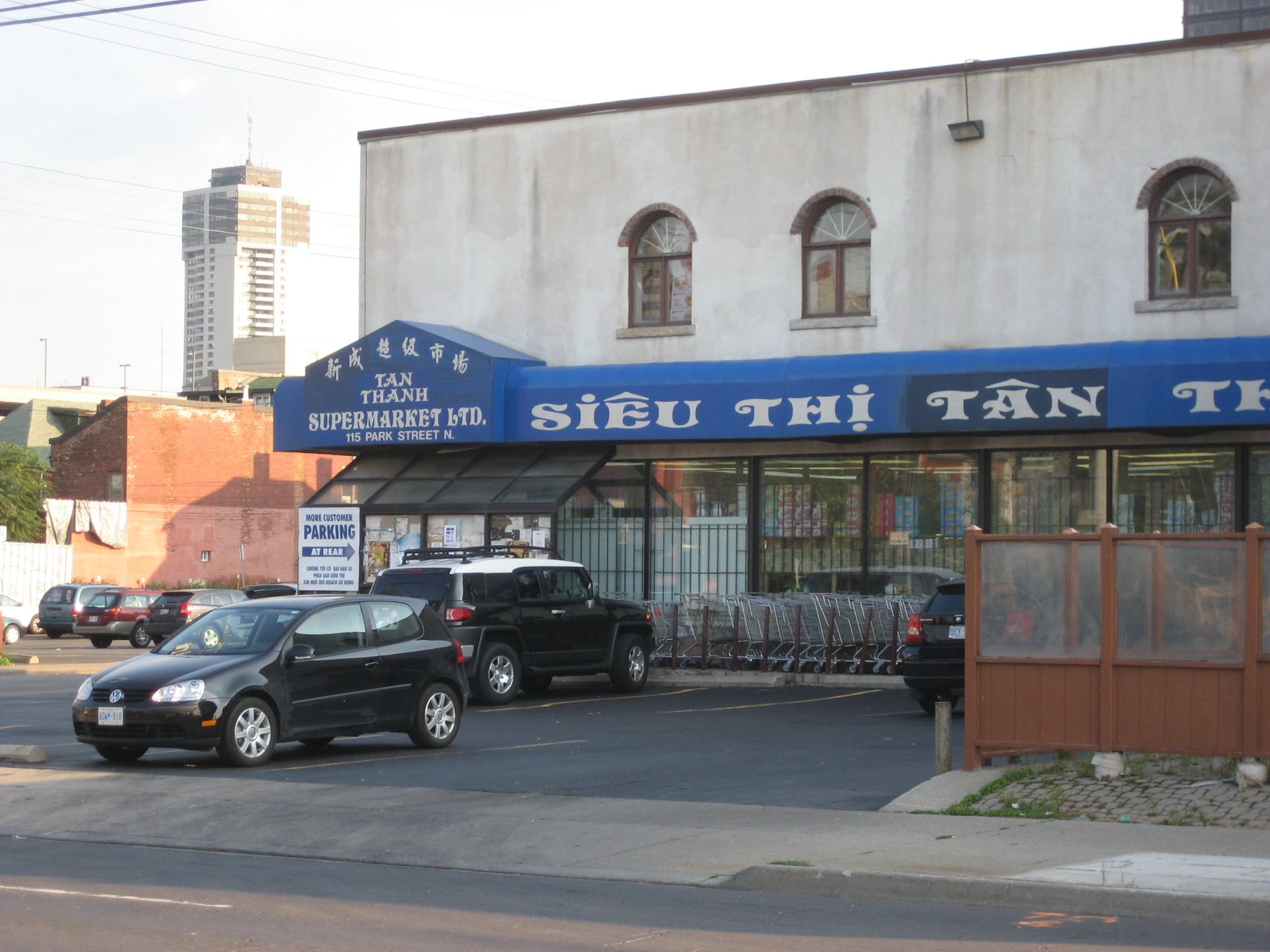
Tan Thanh Vietnamese Supermarket

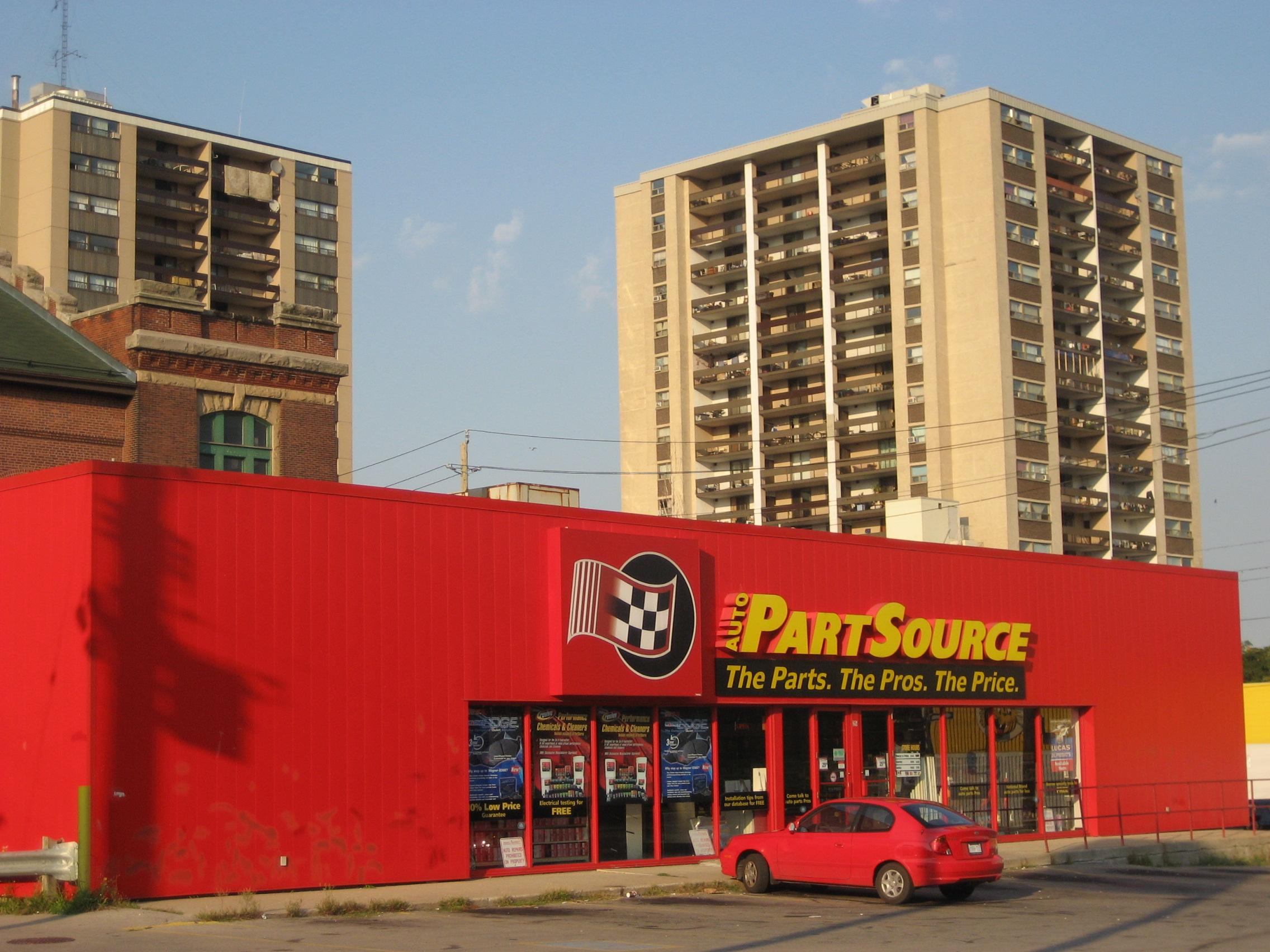
Auto Part Source

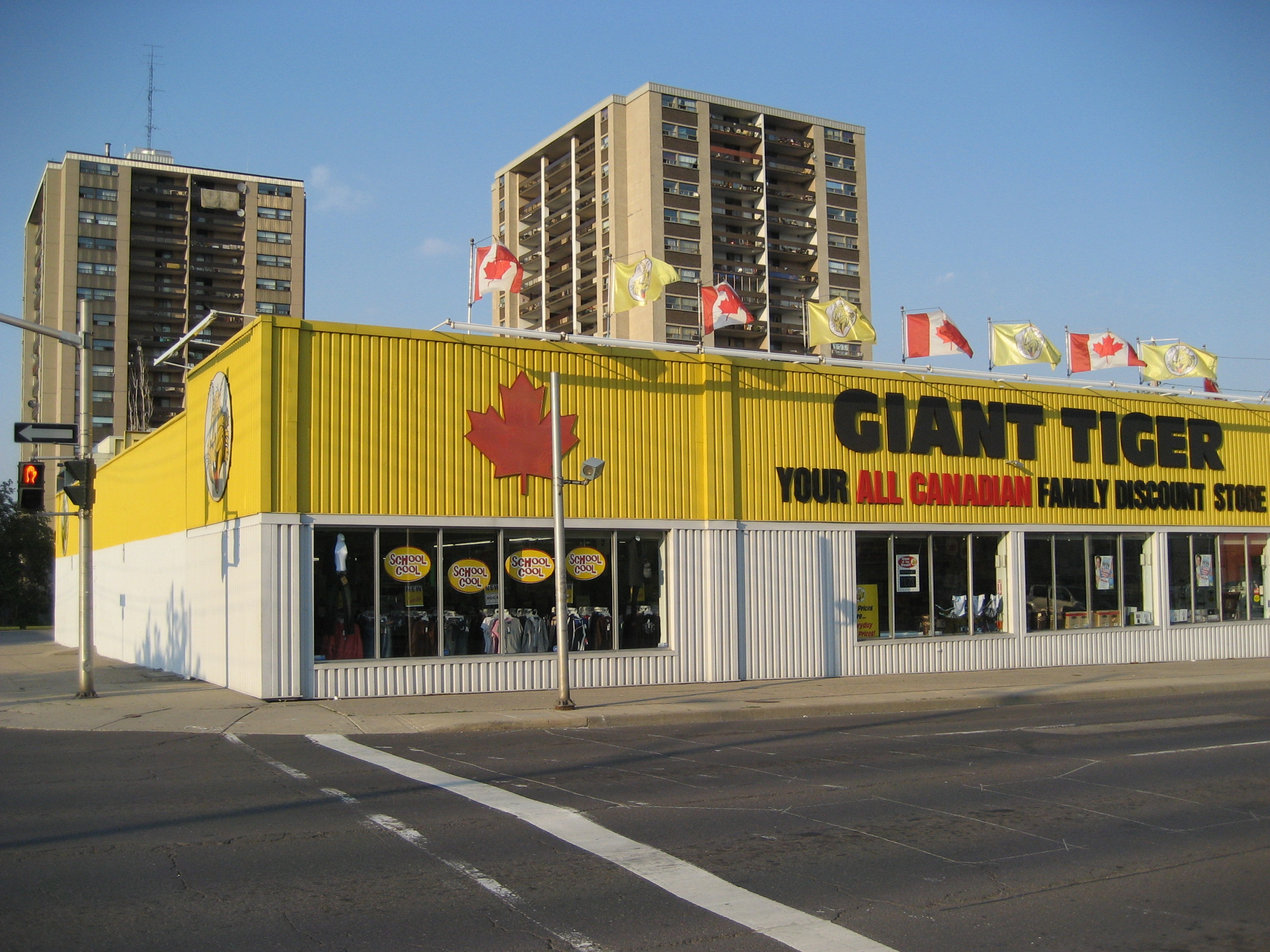
Giant Tiger Discount store

Note: Listing of Landmarks from West to East.

- Hess Street Elementary School
- Railway Street
- Sir John A. Macdonald Secondary School
- Tan Thanh Supermarket Inc. (Vietnamese)
- T & H Auto Electric Ltd., building
- Jamesville, which is shared by the Italian & Portuguese communities of Hamilton
- Mixed Media, (building)
- site of the old Tivoli Theatre
- Auto Part Source- (discount auto parts centre)
- Active Green + Ross: Complete Tire & Auto Centre
- Firth Brothers Ltd. (5-storey factory building)
- Giant Tiger (All-Canadian family discount store)
- McLaren Park
- United Trophy Mfg. (since 1926)
- Good Shepherd Centre
- 134 Mary Street Building (Cannon Knitting Mills Limited)
- Chevrolet City, (car dealership)
- Beasley Park
- Beasley Park Community Centre
- Barton Auto Parts
- Paper Fibres Inc., (company)
- Wellington Tavern
- Canada Post Corporation: Hamilton letter carrier depot 1
- Barton Auto Parts
- St. Brigids Elementary School
- Hamilton Cab 777-7777 (headquarters)
- Wentworth Baptist Church
- Hamilton Stirton TS Electrical complex
- Brian Timmis Stadium,
  - Ivor Wynne Stadium (right behind Brian Timmis Stadium)
- Scott Park Secondary School
- Scott Park Arena
- Canadian Pacific railway line
- Holy Name of Jesus Elementary School
- Gospel Hall, (church)
- Ottawa Street Shopping District - "Textile District"
- Laidlaw Memorial United Church
- Around the Bay Road Race 5 kilometre marker
- Queen Mary Elementary School
- Holy Family Roman Catholic Church
  - Holy Family Elementary School (right behind Holy Family R.C. Church)
- Cannon Street ends and merges here with Britannia Avenue
- Andrew Warburton Park

== Communities ==
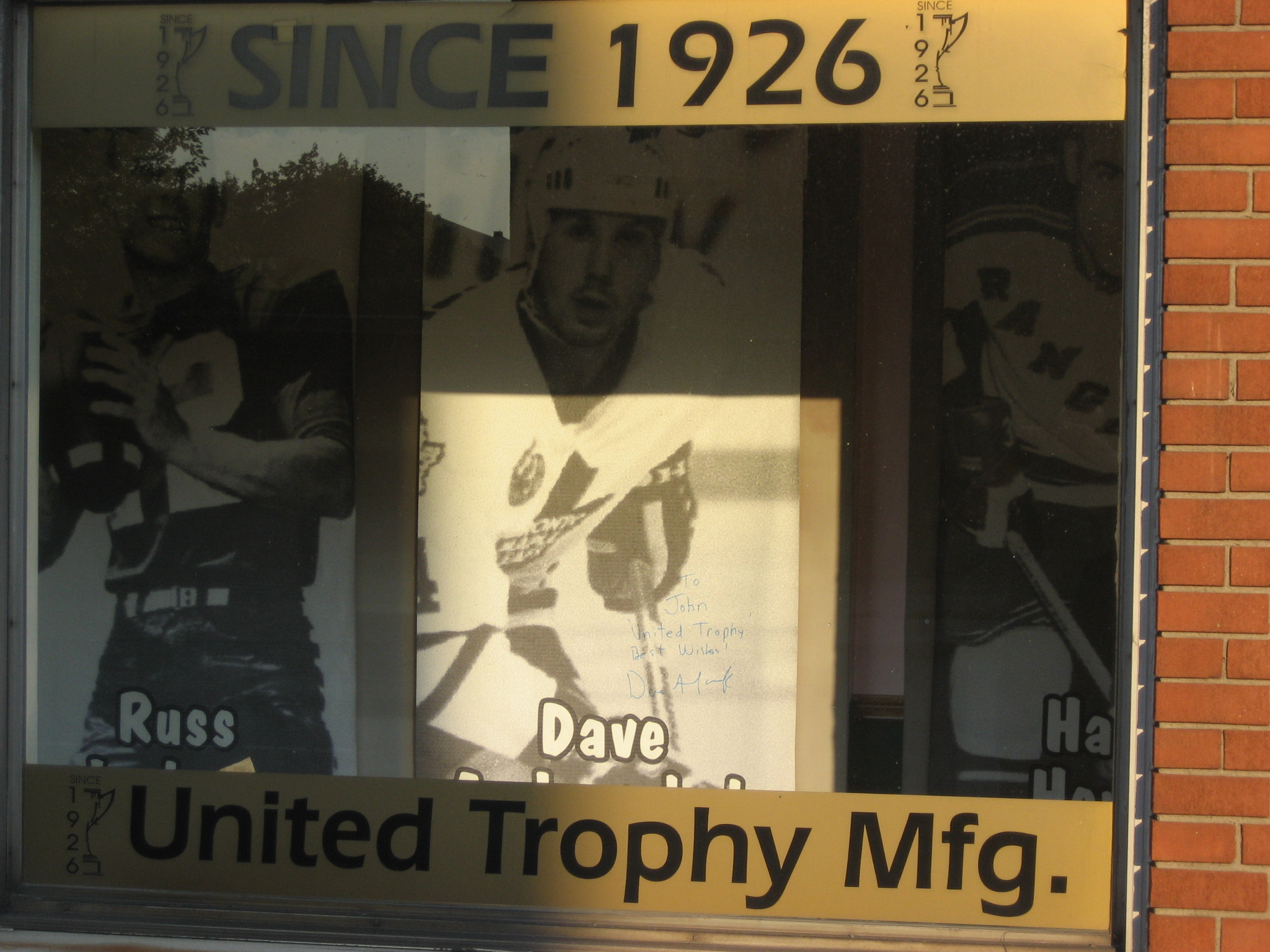
United Trophy Mfg. window

Note: Listing of neighbourhoods from West to East.

- Strathcona
- Central - The financial center of Hamilton, Ontario
- Beasley
- Landsdale
- Gibson
- Stipley
- Crown Point West
- Crown Point East
- Homeside

== Roads that are parallel with Cannon Street ==
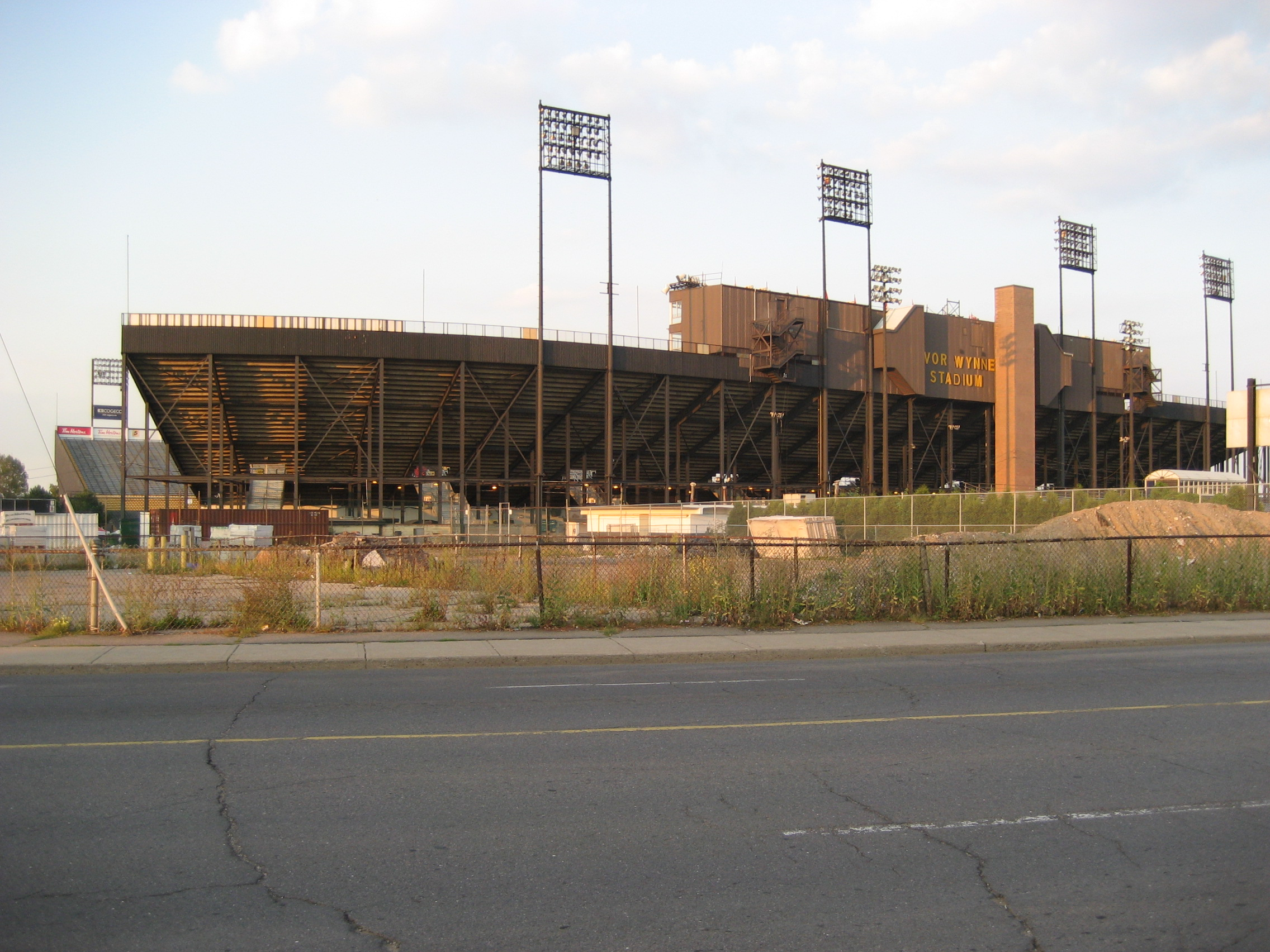
Ivor Wynne Stadium

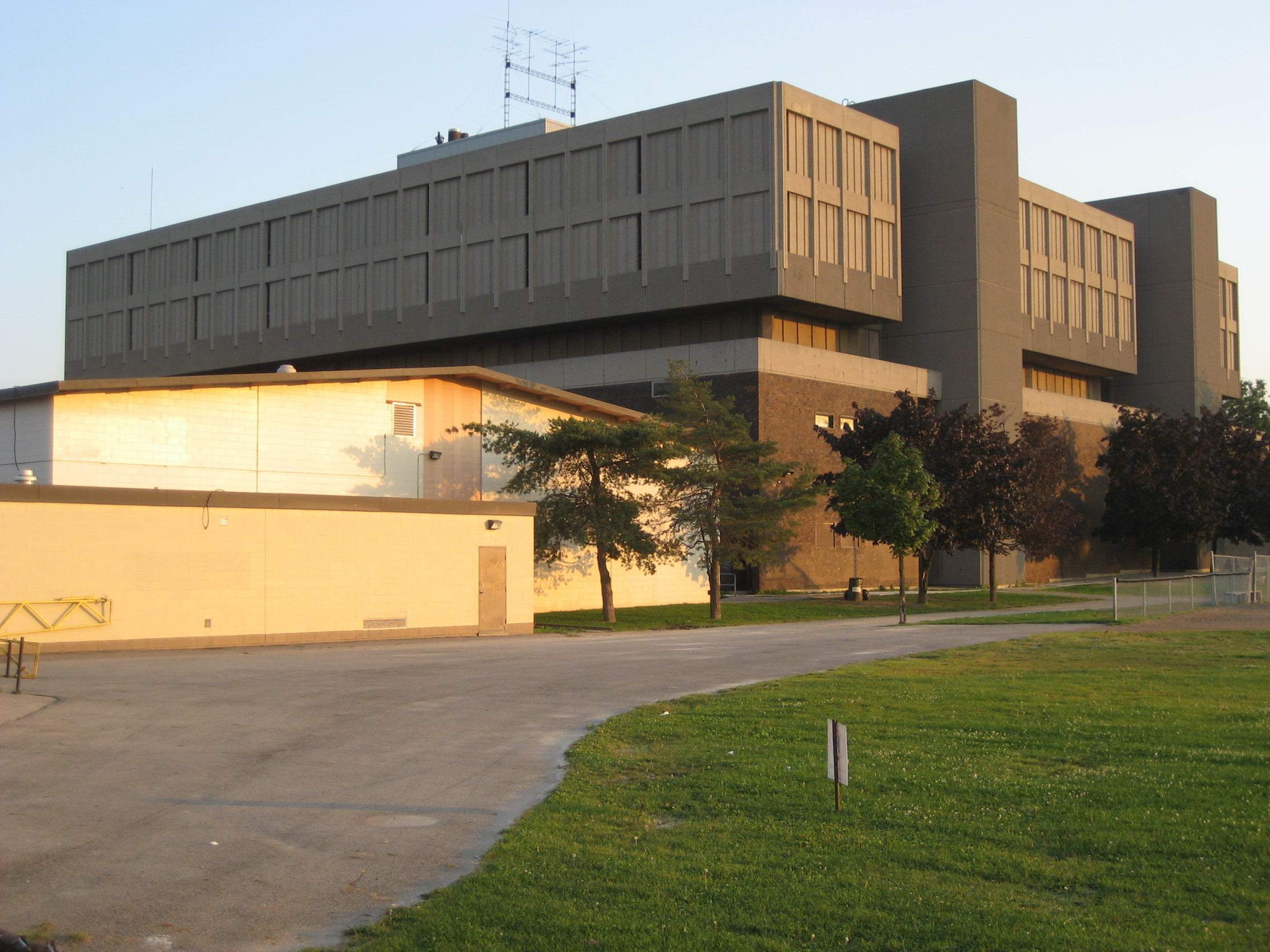
Scott Park Secondary School & Arena

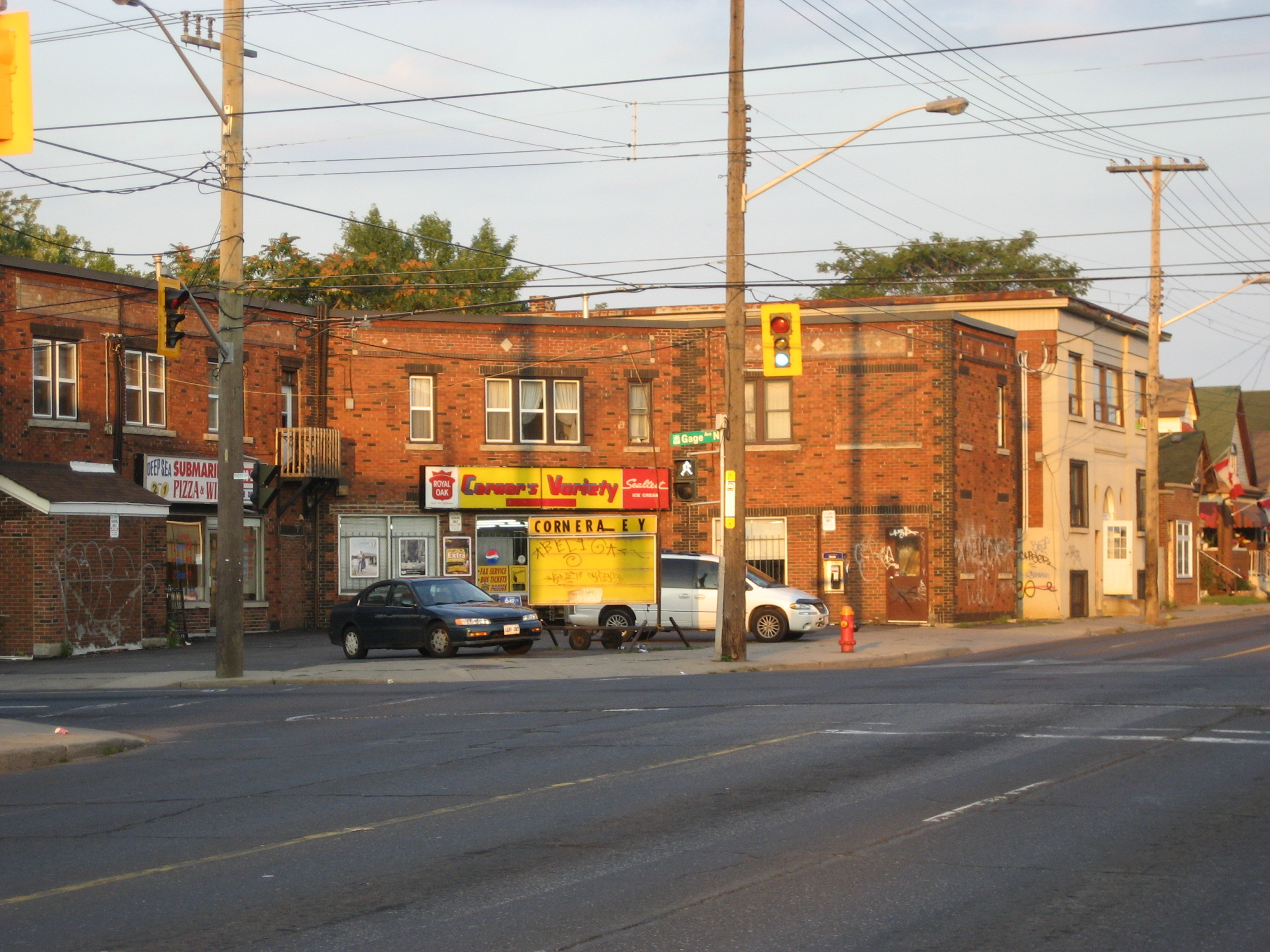
Corner of Cannon and Gage Avenue North

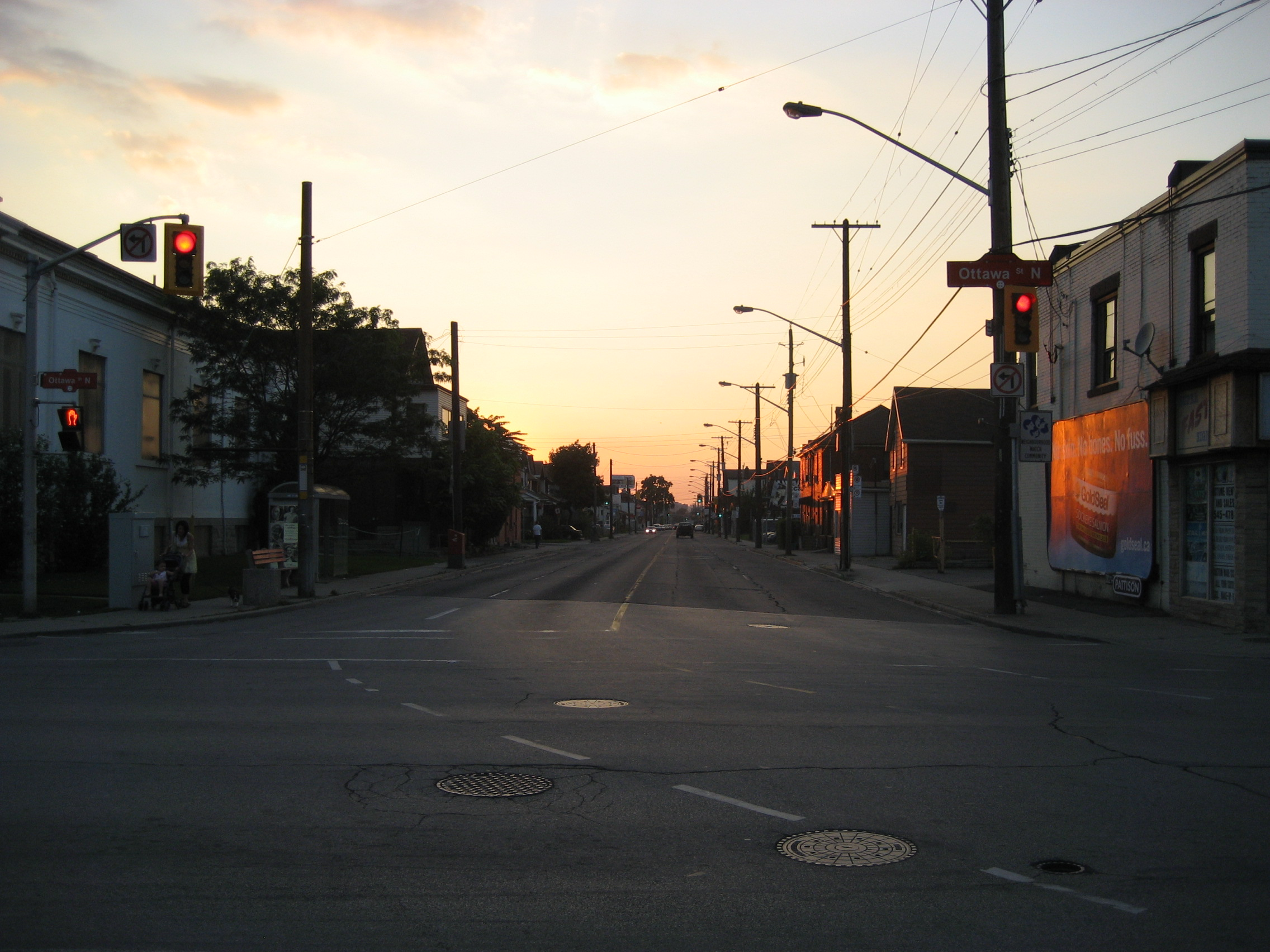
Cannon looking westward from Ottawa Street North

Lower City Roads:

- Burlington Street, West/East
- Barton Street, West/East
- Cannon Street, West/East
- Wilson Street
- King William Street
- King Street, West/East
- Main Street, West/East; - Queenston Road
- Jackson Street, East
- Hunter Street, West/East
- Augusta Street
- Charlton Avenue, West/East
- Aberdeen Avenue

Niagara Escarpment (Mountain) Roads:

- Concession Street
- Queensdale Avenue West/ East
- Scenic Drive - Fennell Avenue, West/East
- Sanatorium Road
- Mohawk Road, West/East
- Limeridge Road West/East
- Lincoln M. Alexander Parkway - Mud Street, (Hamilton City Road 11)
- Stone Church Road, West/East
- ; Rymal Road, West/East
- Twenty Road

== Roads that cross Cannon Street ==
Note: Listing of streets from West to East.

- Queen Street, North
- Hess Street, North
- Bay Street, North
- MacNab Street, North
- James Street, North
- Hughson Street, North
- John Street, North
- Catharine Street, North
- Ferguson Avenue, North
- Wellington Street, North
- Victoria Avenue, North
- Wentworth Street, North
- Sherman Avenue, North
- Gage Avenue, North
- Ottawa Street, North
- Kenilworth Avenue, North
