= Ferguson Avenue =

Road in Hamilton, Ontario, Canada

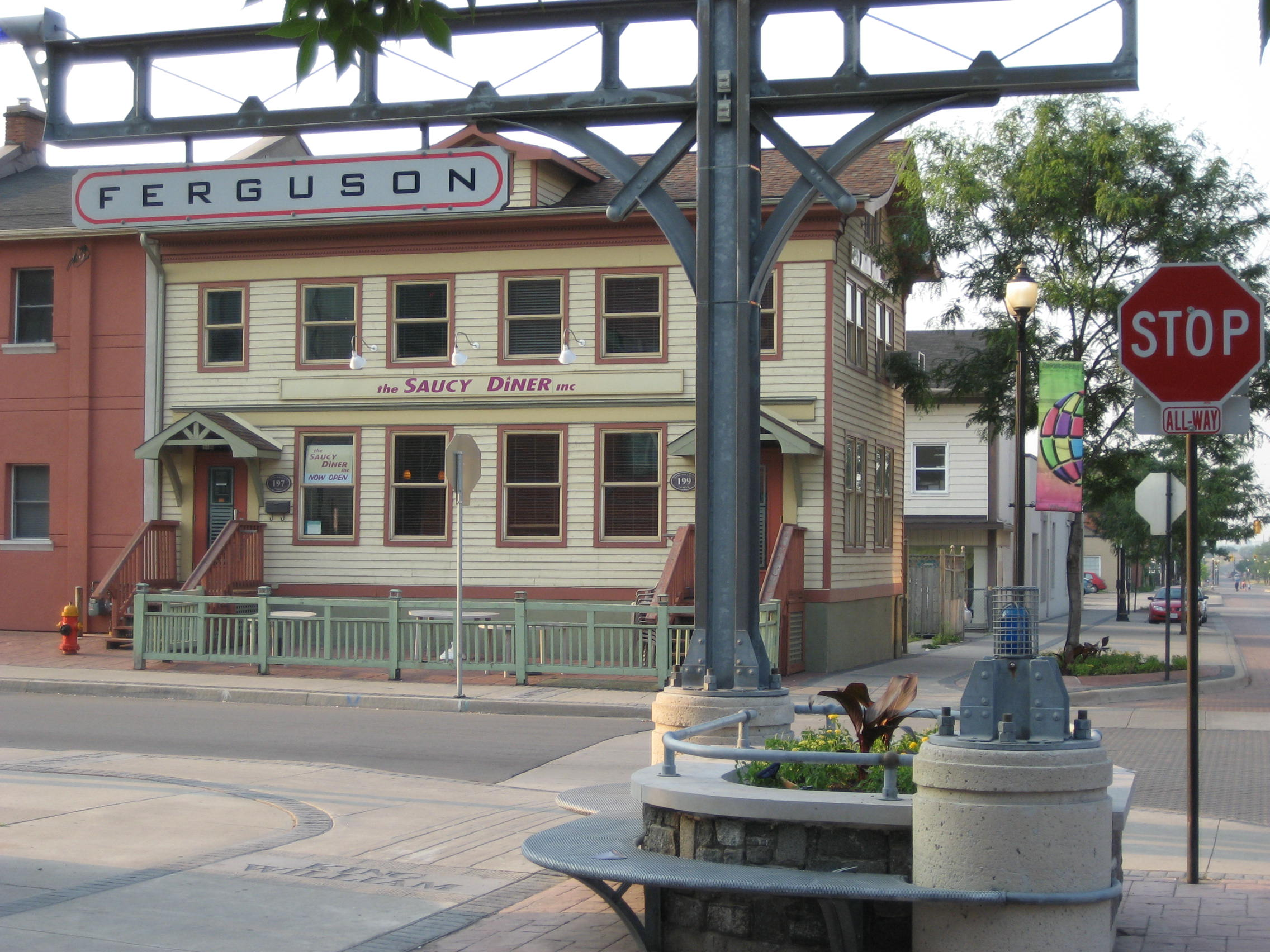
Corner of Ferguson Avenue North & King William Street

Ferguson Avenue is a Lower City collector road in Hamilton, Ontario, Canada. It is a two-way street throughout that starts off at the base of the Mountain (Niagara Escarpment) on Foster Street. It is interrupted 3 blocks north at Corktown Park where Canadian Pacific Railway lines passes through it. Ferguson Avenue resumes again north of the Park right before Hunter Street East, extending northward past Barton Street East through the city's North End industrial neighbourhood where it ends on Dock Service Road, the site of a Royal Canadian Navy base and Pier 10.

== History ==
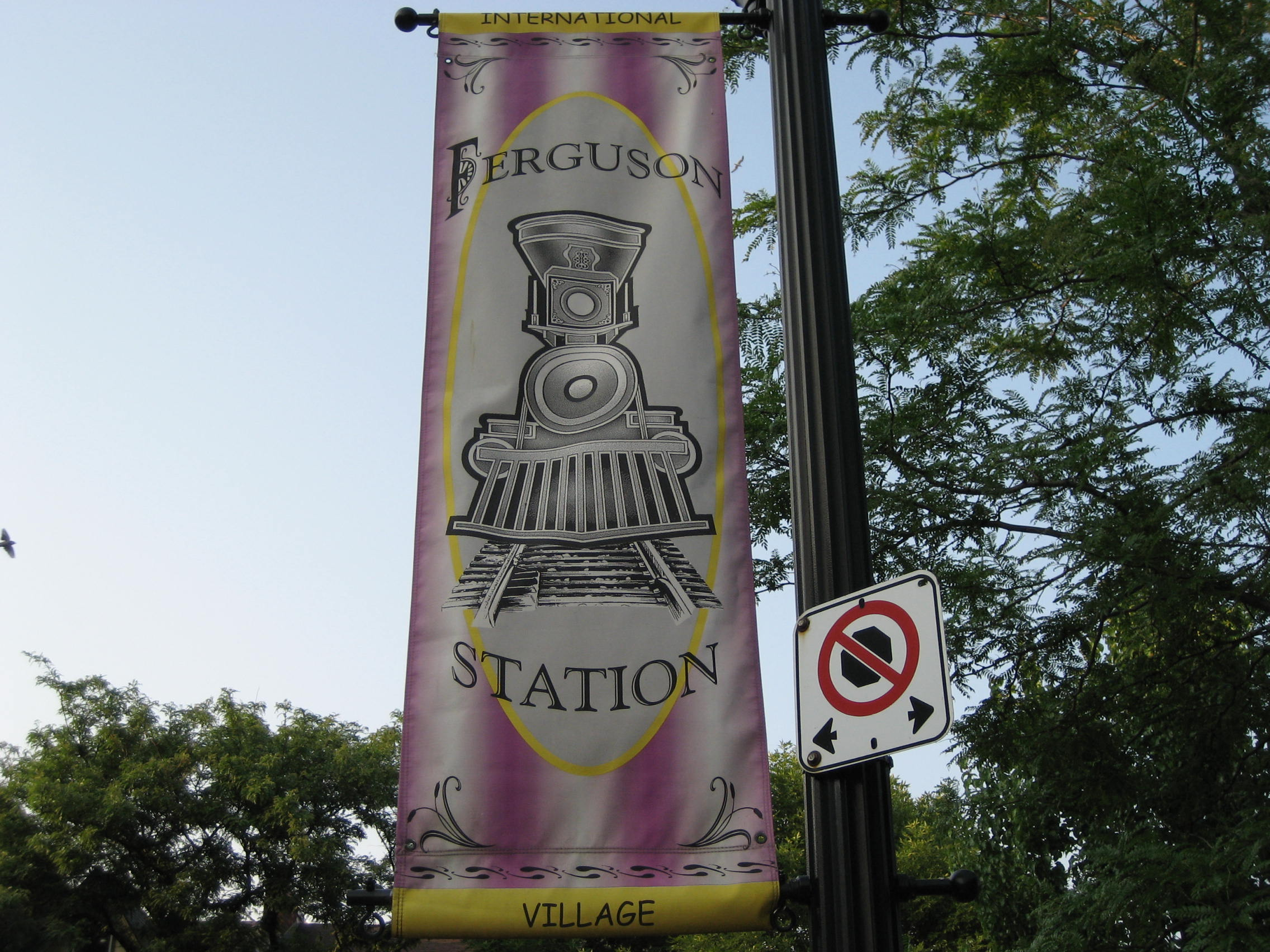
Street banner

Ferguson Street was named after Peter Ferguson an early settler. Mary Street was named after his wife, Mary Ferguson.

Ferguson Station is a defunct train station in downtown Hamilton. It used to be the Hamilton terminal for the Grand Trunk Railway Company. There was also a railyard north and south of this station. The North yard was on Ferguson Avenue between Cannon Street East and Barton Street East. The South yard was on Ferguson Avenue at Young Street. Ferguson Avenue south of Main Street used to be called, Cherry Street. Back in its day, Ferguson Station was referred to as the "King Street Station". Freight rail service continued on a line running down the middle of Ferguson Avenue until the mid-1980s.

On July 25, 2008, a newly constructed bridge opened up on Ferguson Avenue North, just north of Barton Street East, to Simcoe Street East. This part of Ferguson was separated by CN railway tracks and better connects the downtown to Hamilton's waterfront. The $4.6 million construction project began in November 2006 and includes one lane of traffic in each direction, bicycle lanes and sidewalks. This project is also in line with Hamilton’s recently adopted Transportation Master Plan which emphasizes enhanced cycling and walking facilities and an efficient road network to support economic development. This construction project received federal funding through the Federal Gas Tax Fund.

== Festivals ==
Hamilton was also home to the Mustard Festival from 1998 to 2010. Hamilton is home to the largest miller of dry mustard in the world. It was held annually on Labour Day weekend at Ferguson Station at Hamilton's International Village and was a summertime food & beverage festival that features some of the top Blues and Jazz acts in the region.

== Landmarks ==
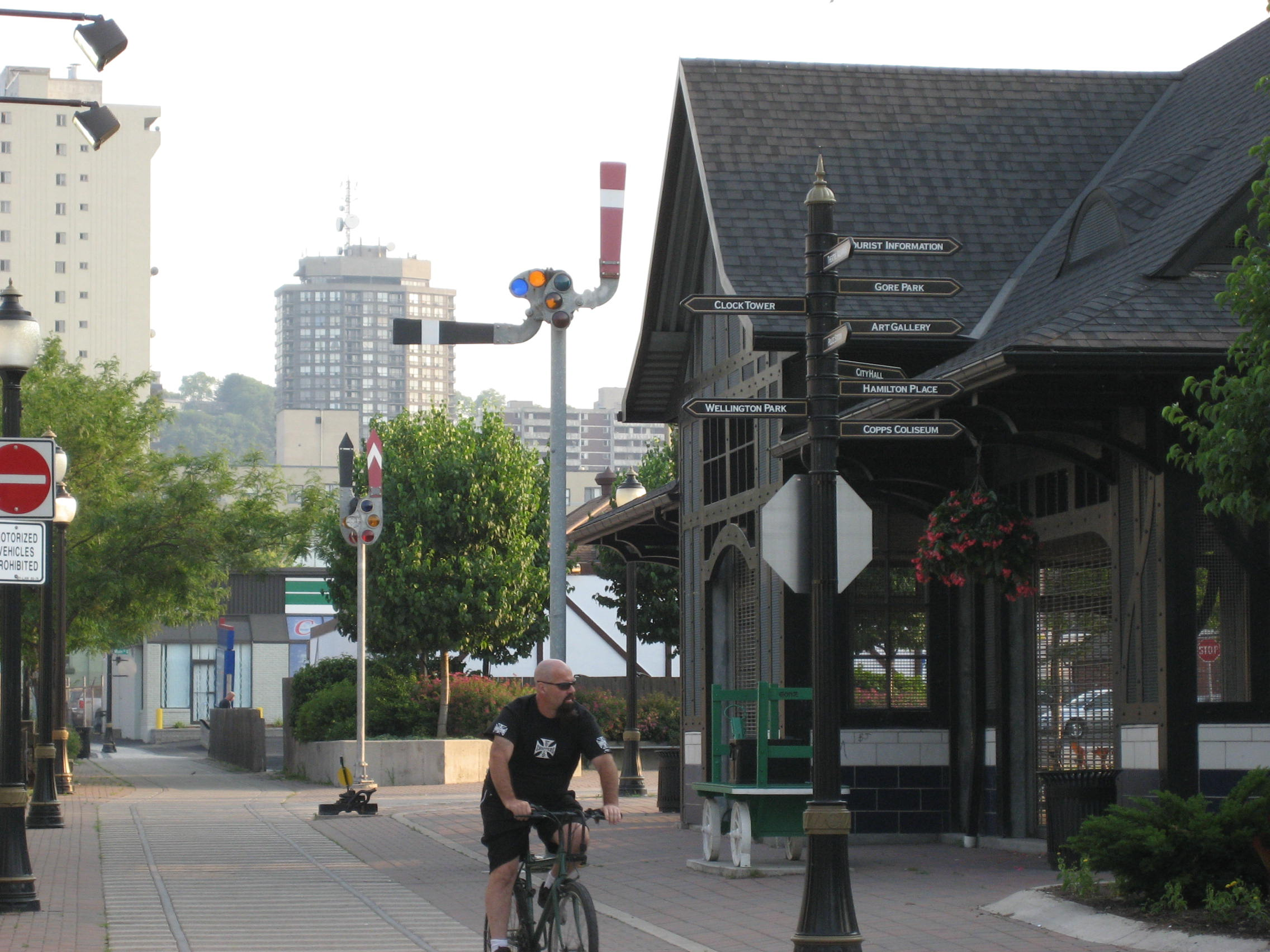
Ferguson Station, at King Street East

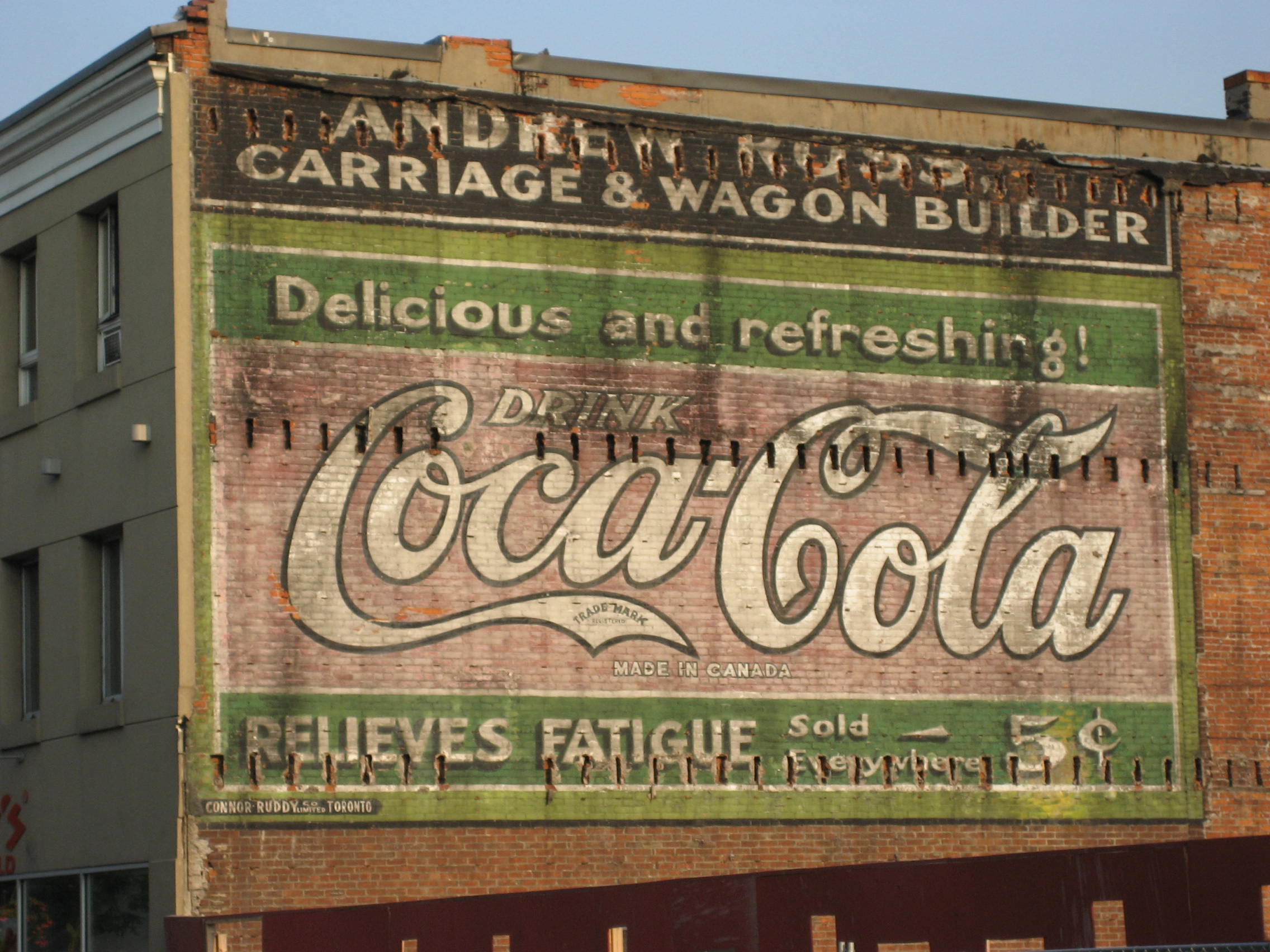
Corner of Ferguson & King Streets, Andrew Ross, onetime business owner of the area.

Note: Listing of Landmarks from North to South.

- Pier 10
- Royal Canadian Navy, Army and Sea Cadets
- Ferrie Street Park
- Simcoe Street Park
- Ferguson Avenue bridge/overpass, Canadian National railway tracks
- Hamilton Regional Detention Centre (Barton street jail)
- Hamilton Regional Police station
- Theatre Aquarius
- Beasley Park
- Beasley Park Community Centre
- Ferguson Station (historic site)- defunct Grand Trunk Railway train station, site of the summertime Mustard Festival
- International Village (shopping district)
- Escarpment Rail Trail (abandoned railway path)
- Corktown Park
- Shamrock Park
- Bruce Trail
- Niagara Escarpment (mountain)

== Communities ==
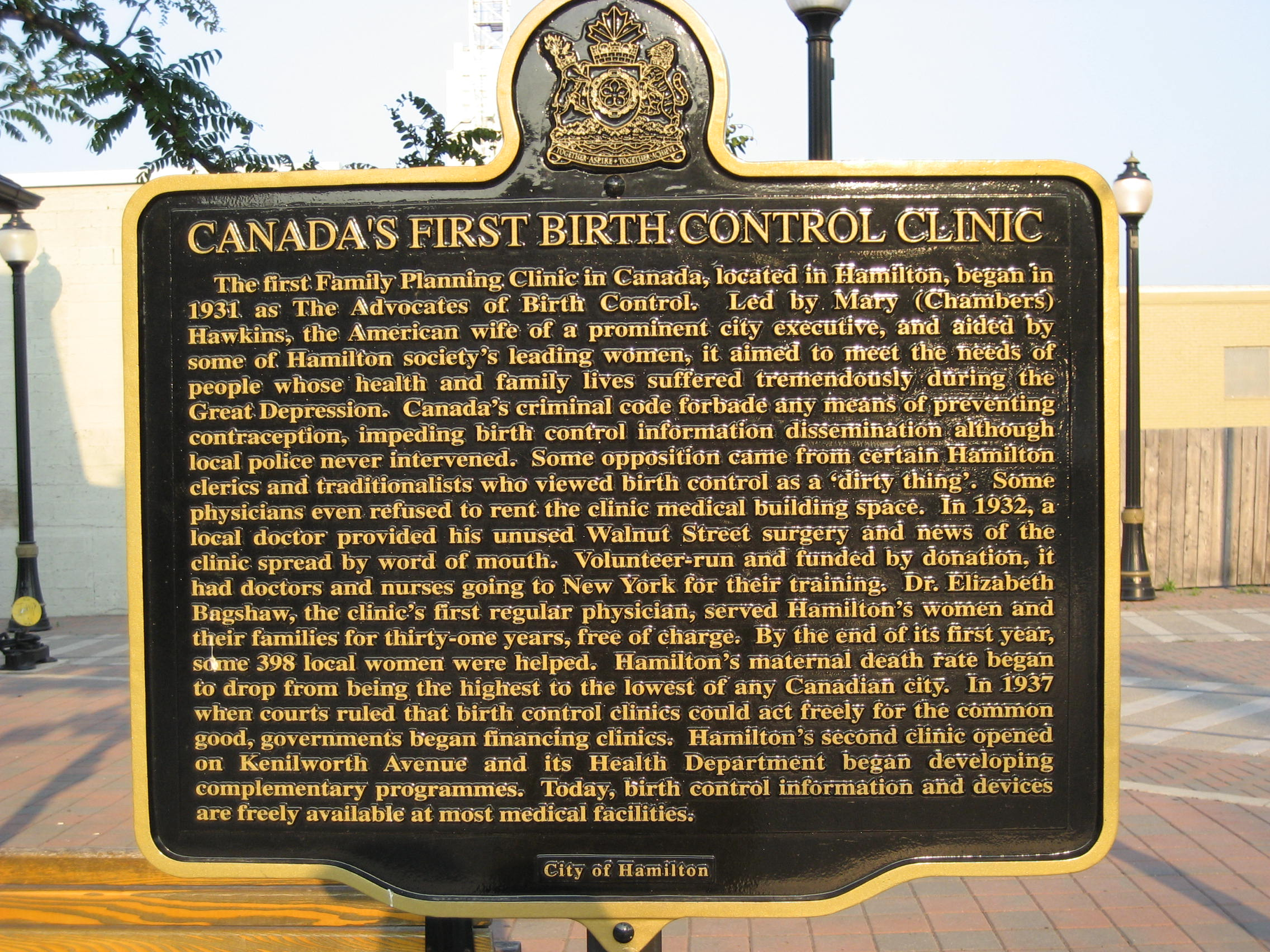
Canada's first Birth Control Clinic, plaque at Ferguson Station

Note: Listing of neighbourhoods from North to South

- North End - Everything north of the Canadian National Railway tracks
- Beasley
- Corktown

== Images ==
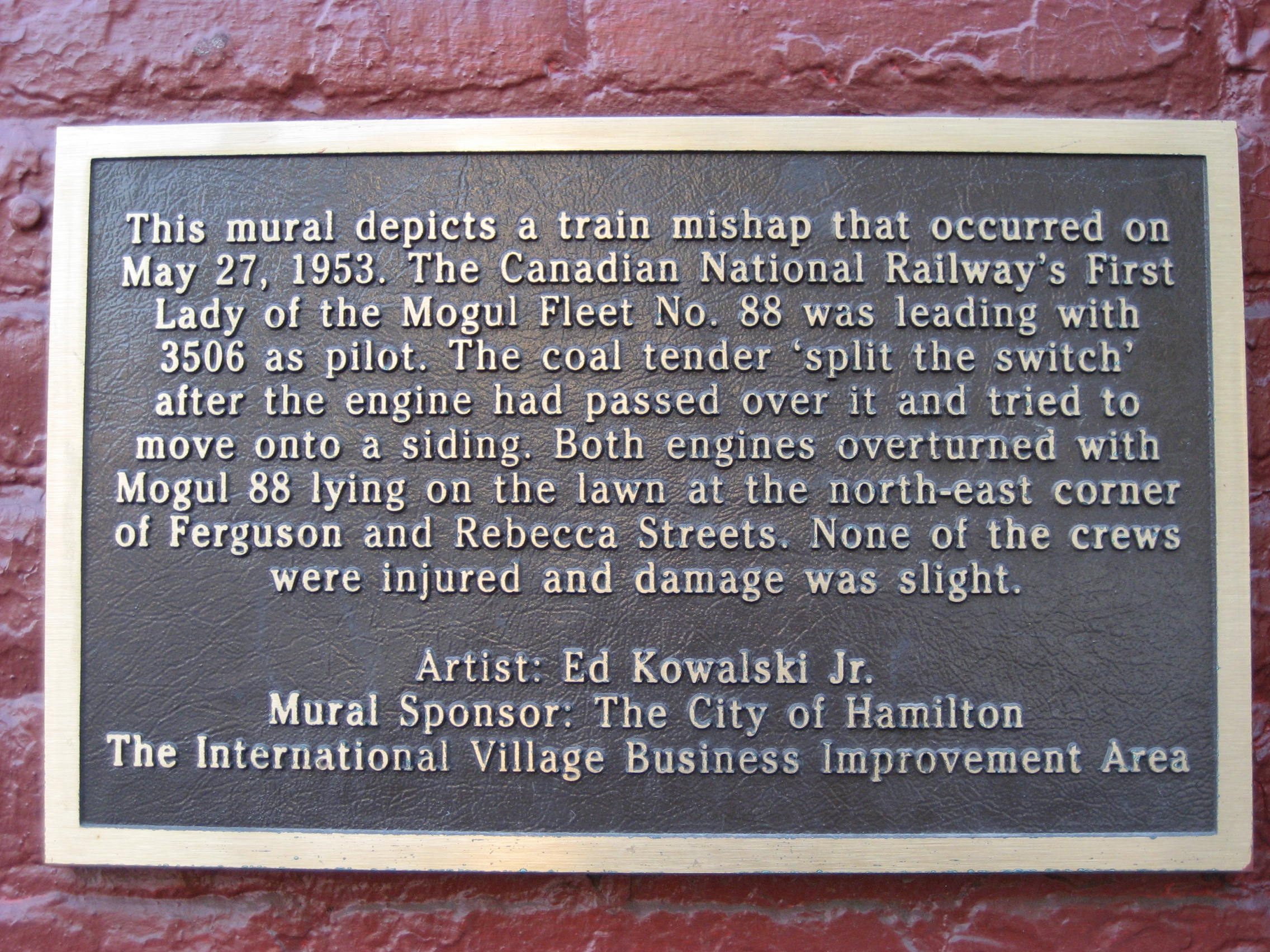
1953 Train Derailment, description

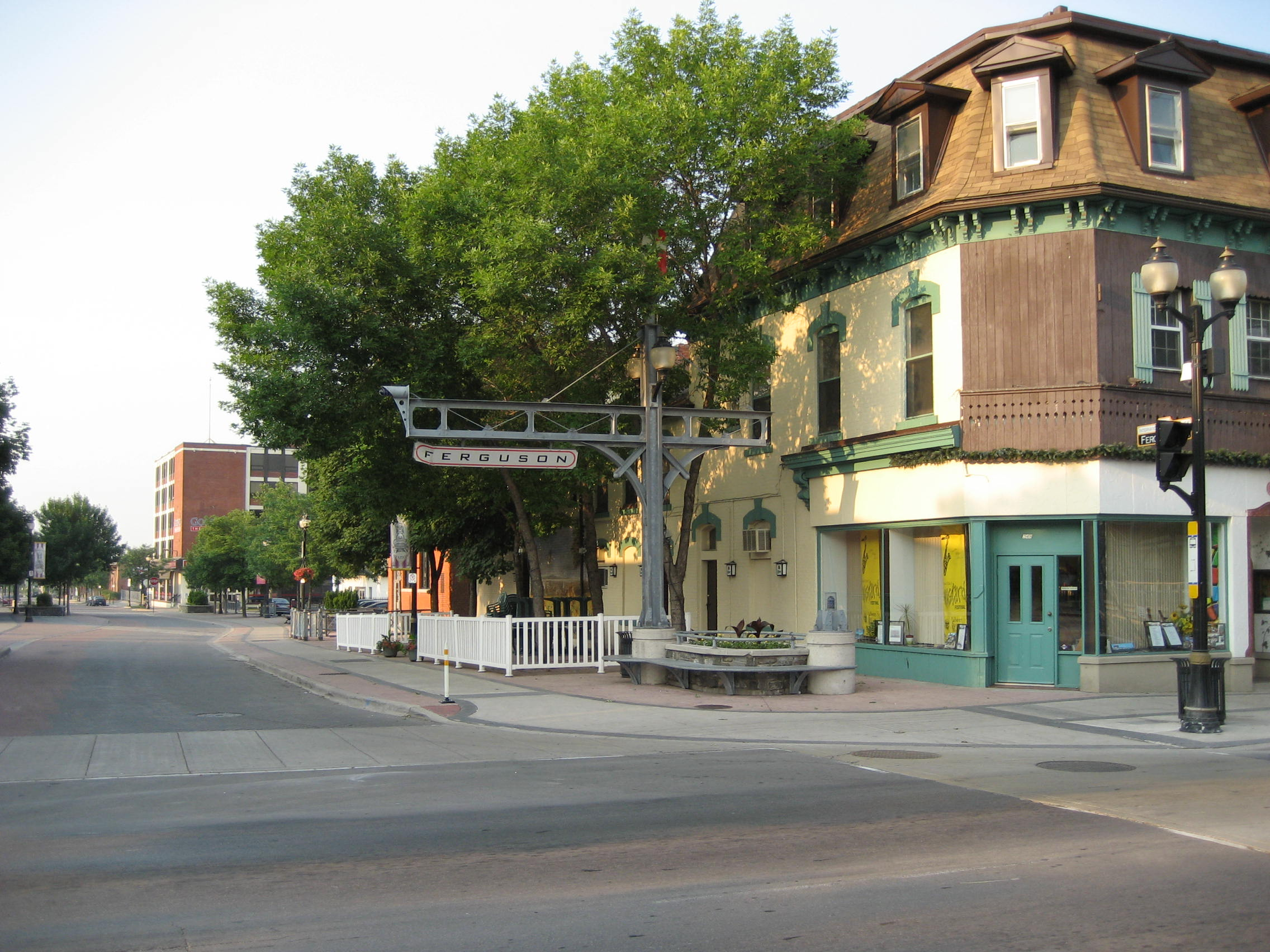
Corner Ferguson & King Streets

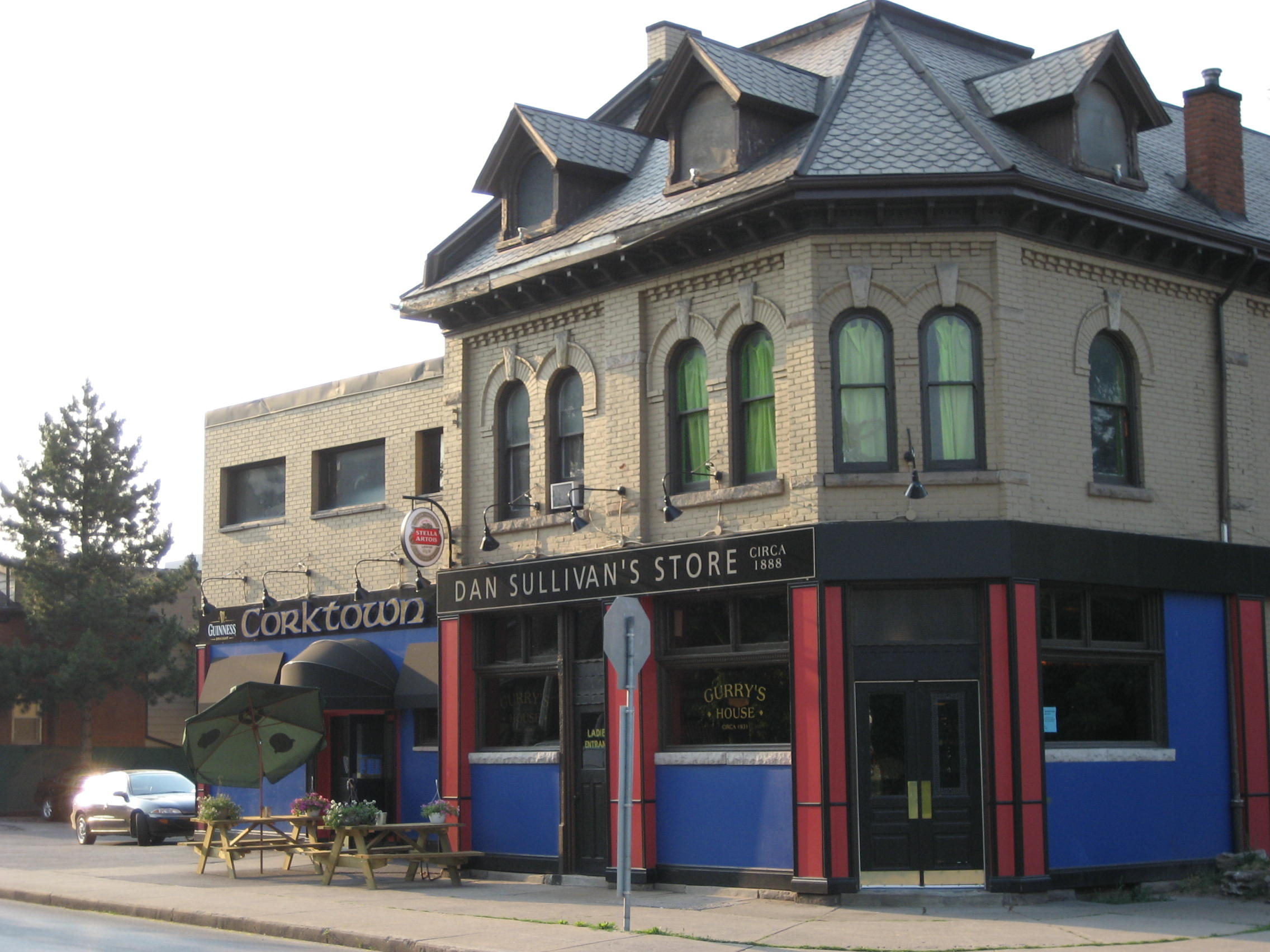
Corktown, Ferguson South, landmark

== See also ==
- Niagara Escarpment Commission
