= Samuel D. Betzner =

Samuel D. Betzner (March 1, 1771 – August 10, 1856) was an American-born settler and district constable in Upper Canada. He was born in Lancaster County, Pennsylvania to a Mennonite farmer, Samuel Betzner Sr., and his wife, Maria Detweiler. He married before 1798 to Elizabeth Brech, and died near Flamborough, Ontario.

Betzner and his brother-in-law moved to Upper Canada in 1799 to join other Mennonites from Pennsylvania. The following spring, after wintering in Ancaster, they searched for land of their own. They bought land from Richard Beasley and partners in what became Waterloo County and constructed buildings. They were followed by other Mennonites from Pennsylvania, looking for inexpensive land and continued exemption from military service.

Betzner is recognized as one of the earliest settlers in Waterloo County. Many of Betzner's descendants continue to live throughout parts of Southern and Southwestern Ontario.
