= Beasley Park =

Park in Hamilton, Ontario, Canada

- Location within Southern Ontario
- Interactive map of Beasley Park
- Type: Urban park
- Location: Hamilton, Ontario
- Coordinates: 43°15′29″N 79°51′44″W
- Created: 1976
- Open: All year

Beasley Park is a park in the Lower City of Hamilton, Ontario, Canada and named after Richard Beasley, (1761–1842), a soldier, political figure, farmer, and businessman in Upper Canada. who was one of Hamilton's first settlers and came to Canada from New York in 1777.

Beasley Park is bounded by Cannon Street (north), Mary Street (west), Wilson Street (south) and Ferguson Avenue (east).

== History ==
Beasley Park was originally developed in 1976. Until then, Beasley Park was the site of some of Hamilton's early industries, including the Grand Trunk Railway yards. In 1991, the redevelopment of the park was deemed a priority for revitalization of the Beasley neighbourhood.

Improvements included the installation of an accessible creative play structure, a decorative fountain, concrete walkway, a community centre, and a skateboarding area. Funding was provided by the Province of Ontario through the programme for Renewal, Improvement, Development, Economic revitalization and Housing Intensification (P.R.I.D.E. H.I.N.T.) and the City of Hamilton.
