= Richard Beasley (politician) =

Canadian politician

Personal details
- Born: July 21, 1761 Province of New York, New England
- Died: February 16, 1842 (aged 80) Hamilton, Canada West

Richard Beasley (July 21, 1761 – February 16, 1842) was a soldier, political figure, farmer, and businessman in Upper Canada.

== Early life ==
He was born in the British colony of New York in 1761 and moved to Quebec in 1777. In 1783, he partnered with Peter Smith in the fur trade. In 1788, he settled in Barton Township on Lake Ontario near the current city of Hamilton, still involved in trading furs. Richard Beasley became one of the founders of Ancaster when he gave millwright James Wilson half of the financial backing to build a grist-mill in 1791 and a sawmill in 1792. In 1797, Beasley sold his half-share of the mills to fur trader and businessman Jean Rousseaux. Ultimately, by 1800, after speculating on land originally granted to the Six Nations of the Grand River in 1784 by the Haldimand Proclamation along the Grand River, he was forced to sell part of his property to cover debts. At one time, he owned 13,350 acres (54.0 km^{2}) of land in what is now Kitchener, Ontario. Much of it was later sold to German-speaking Pennsylvania Dutch settlers.

== Political career ==
In 1796, he was elected to the 2nd Parliament of Upper Canada, representing Durham, York & 1st Lincoln. He was also appointed magistrate in the same year. In the next Parliament, he represented West York, Lincoln & Haldimand and served as speaker from 1803 to 1804. In 1802, he became a lieutenant colonel in the York Militia. In 1808, he was elected to represent West York in the 5th Parliament, but he was unseated because it was found that his agent had closed the polls too early. Beasley, like most of the members of the Upper Canada Legislative Assembly during this period, was a enslaver. He enslaved several people in Hamilton.

Beasley occupied Burlington Heights (now the site of Dundurn Castle and Harvey Park) in 1790, establishing a trading operation there.

In May 1813, British forces retreating from the Niagara area set up camp on his land, erecting earthworks and other fortifications. The British launched a successful counter-attack against the Americans from this encampment at Stoney Creek a week later. After the War of 1812, he regained his land from the British and took part in a convention organized by radical reformer Robert Fleming Gourlay. As a result, he lost his post as magistrate. In addition, allegations regarding his participation in the War of 1812 were raised.

Financial difficulties forced Beasley to sell lands at Burlington Heights, but it was purchased by Sir Allan Napier MacNab who built Dundurn Castle on the foundations of Beasley's brick home.

In 1824, he was elected to represent Halton and became a magistrate again in 1827.

He died in Hamilton in 1842. His grave site is at the back of Christ Church Cathedral in Hamilton, Ontario.

== Legacy ==
The Beasley neighbourhood in Hamilton is named after him. It is bounded by Barton Street East (north), Main Street East (south), John Street North (west) and Wellington Street North (east). Notable features of this neighbourhood include Landmark Place, Royal Connaught Hotel and Beasley Park, which was also named after him.

Richard Beasley Public School, also named after him, is a primary school on Hamilton's east mountain.

== See also ==
- Samuel D. Betzner
