= Beasley, Hamilton =

Neighbourhood in Hamilton, Ontario, Canada

Coordinates: 43°15′40″N 79°51′40″W

Beasley is a neighbourhood in the Lower City area of Hamilton, Ontario, Canada. The Beasley neighbourhood is bounded in the north by the Canadian National Railway tracks just north of Barton Street, James Street (west), Main Street (south) and Wellington Street (east).

== History ==
Beasley is one of the oldest and one of the first four neighbourhoods of Hamilton, the other three being Central, Durand and Corktown. It is named after Richard Beasley, (1761-1842), a soldier, political figure, farmer, and businessman in Upper Canada who was one of Hamilton's first settlers.

He came to Canada from New York in 1777, occupied Burlington Heights (now the site of Dundurn and Harvey Parks) in 1790, and was granted land by the Crown in 1799. A local entrepreneur, Beasley's business ventures included fur trading, land acquisition and establishment of a grist mill in Ancaster. He was a member of the Legislative Assembly of Upper Canada from 1791 to 1804 and was appointed colonel of the 2nd Regiment of the York Militia in 1809. Financial difficulties forced Beasley to sell lands at Burlington Heights, but they were purchased in 1832 by Sir Allan Napier MacNab, who built Dundurn Castle on the foundations of Beasley's brick home.

Beasley Park in the neighbourhood is also named after him.

== Festivals ==
Hamilton was also home to an annual Mustard Festival from 1998 to 2010. Hamilton is home to the largest miller of dry mustard in the world. It was held annually at Ferguson Station, Ferguson Avenue at Hamilton's International Village and was a summertime food & beverage festival that featured some of the top Blues and Jazz acts in the region.

== Public transportation ==
The Hamilton Street Railway (abbreviated as HSR) operates all public transit vehicles in the city of Hamilton, Ontario.

Below are the HSR Bus Routes found in the Beasley neighbourhood:

- 1/1A King
- 2 Barton
- 3 Cannon
- 10 Beeline Express (interlined with 55/55A/58)

== Attractions ==
- Beasley Park
- Beasley Park Community Centre
- Seventy-Seven Night Club
- The Baltimore House, a music venue and nightclub
- The Underground, Steel City Music Venue
- Theatre Aquarius, Dofasco Centre for the Performing Arts, downtown
- Summertime Mustard Festival at the Ferguson Station (historic site)- defunct Grand Trunk Railway train station.
- International Village (shopping district)
- Wellington Park

== Historical buildings ==
- Royal Connaught Hotel/ Holiday Inn
- The Hamilton Courthouse, with the United Empire Loyalists statue Statue info. at myhamilton.ca
- Ramada Plaza (hotel)
- The Cannon Knitting Mill - defunct Chipman-Holton Knitting Company mill, currently poised for redevelopment
- Ferguson Station (historic site)- defunct Grand Trunk Railway train station, site of the summertime Mustard Festival
- Hamilton General Hospital
- Hamilton Downtown Mosque
- Stewart Memorial Church (originally St. Paul's African Methodist Episcopal Church. 1961 became a Masonic Hall. North of Wilson on John Street)

== See also ==
- List of streets in Hamilton, Ontario
- List of neighbourhoods in Hamilton, Ontario

== Local media/ web links ==
- Our Beasley Website
- The Beasley Badger
