= King William Street (Hamilton, Ontario) =

Lower City collector road in Hamilton, Ontario, Canada

Coordinates: 43.2548°N 79.8587°W

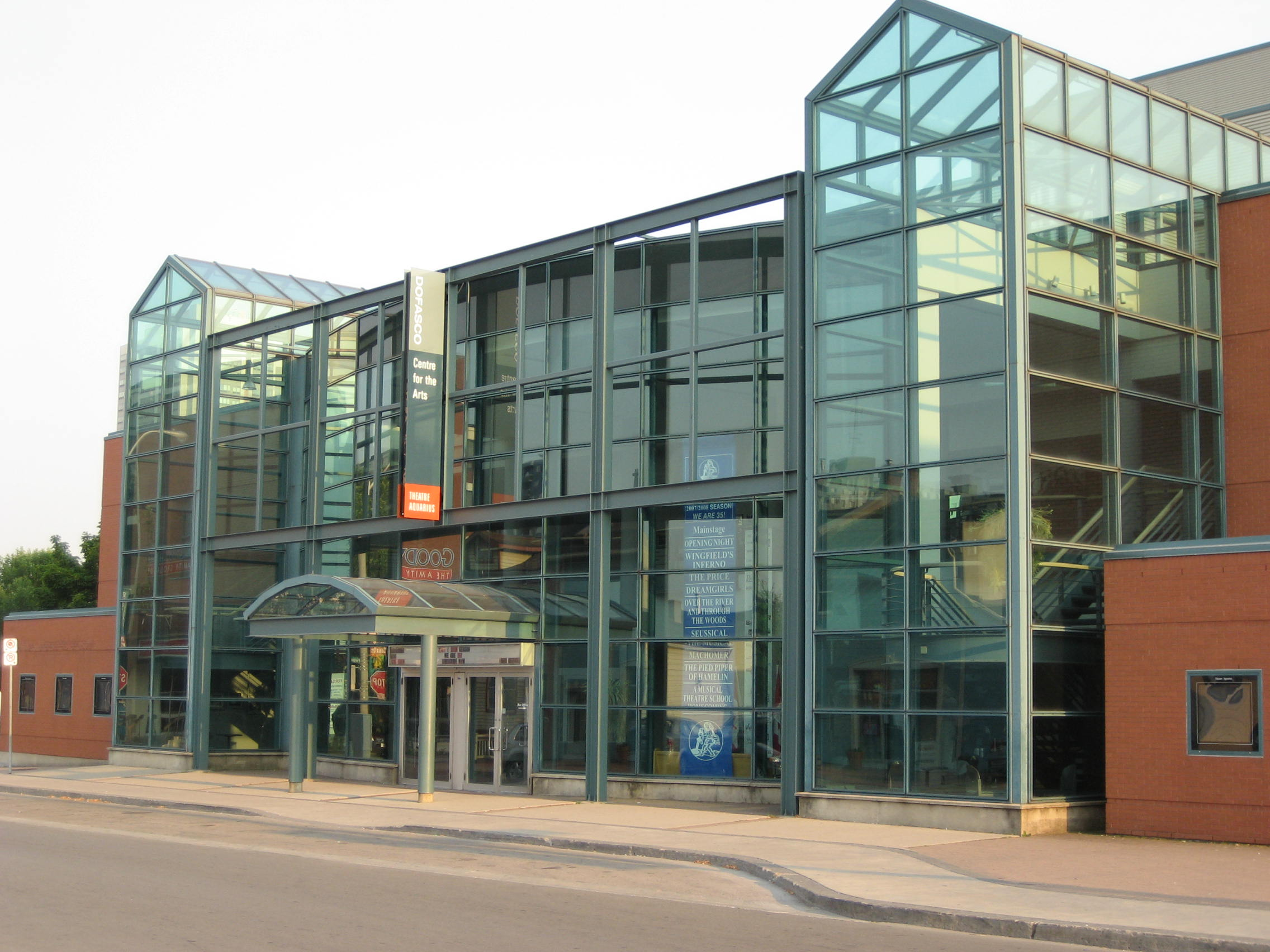
Theatre Aquarius

King William Street is a Lower City collector road in Hamilton, Ontario, Canada. It starts off at the western-end at James Street North and is a one-way street (Eastbound) until Mary Street, where it becomes a two-way street that ends at Wentworth Street North. It is named after King William IV of the British North America.

== Landmarks ==
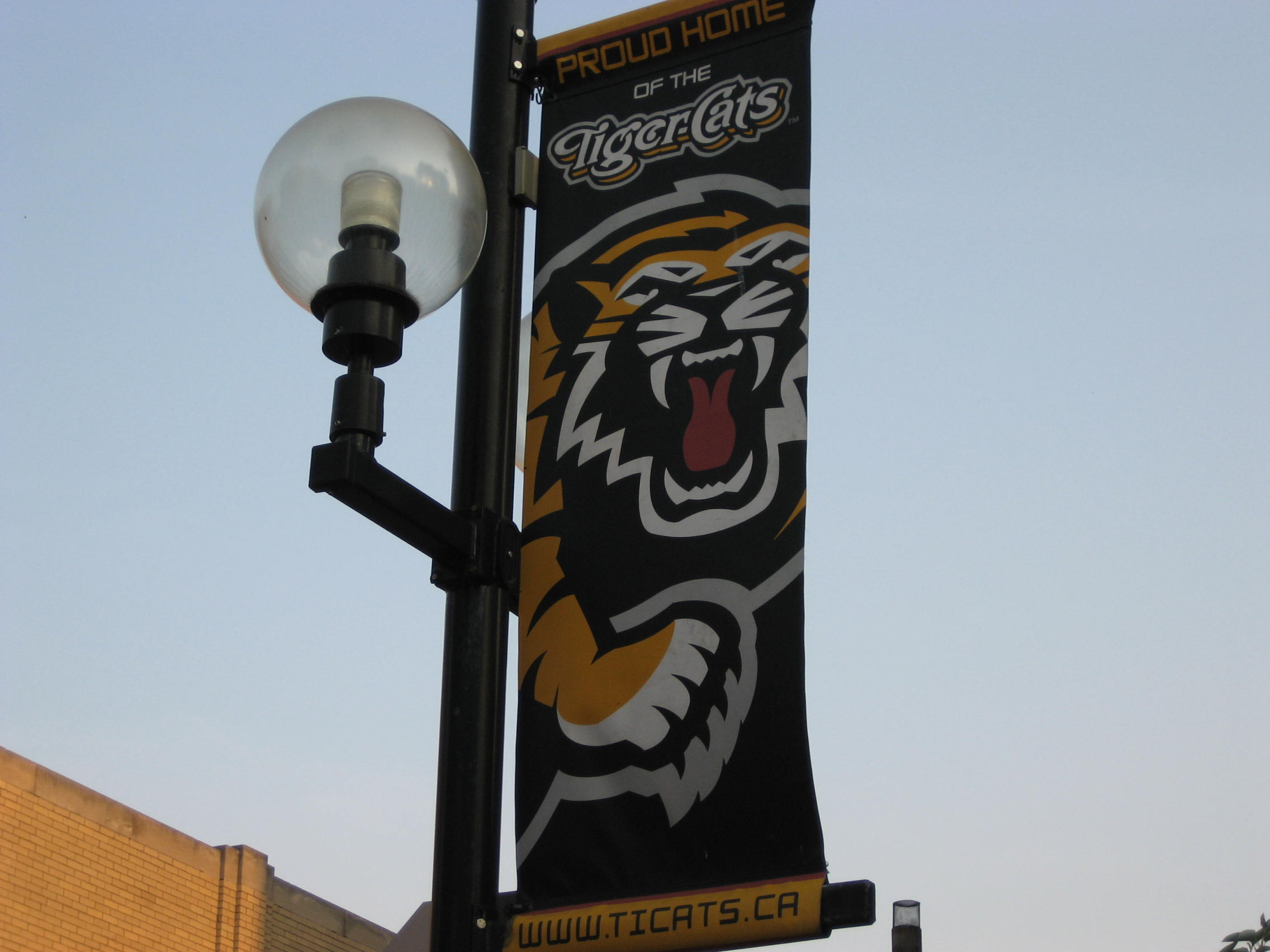
Hamilton Ti-Cats, street banner (2007)

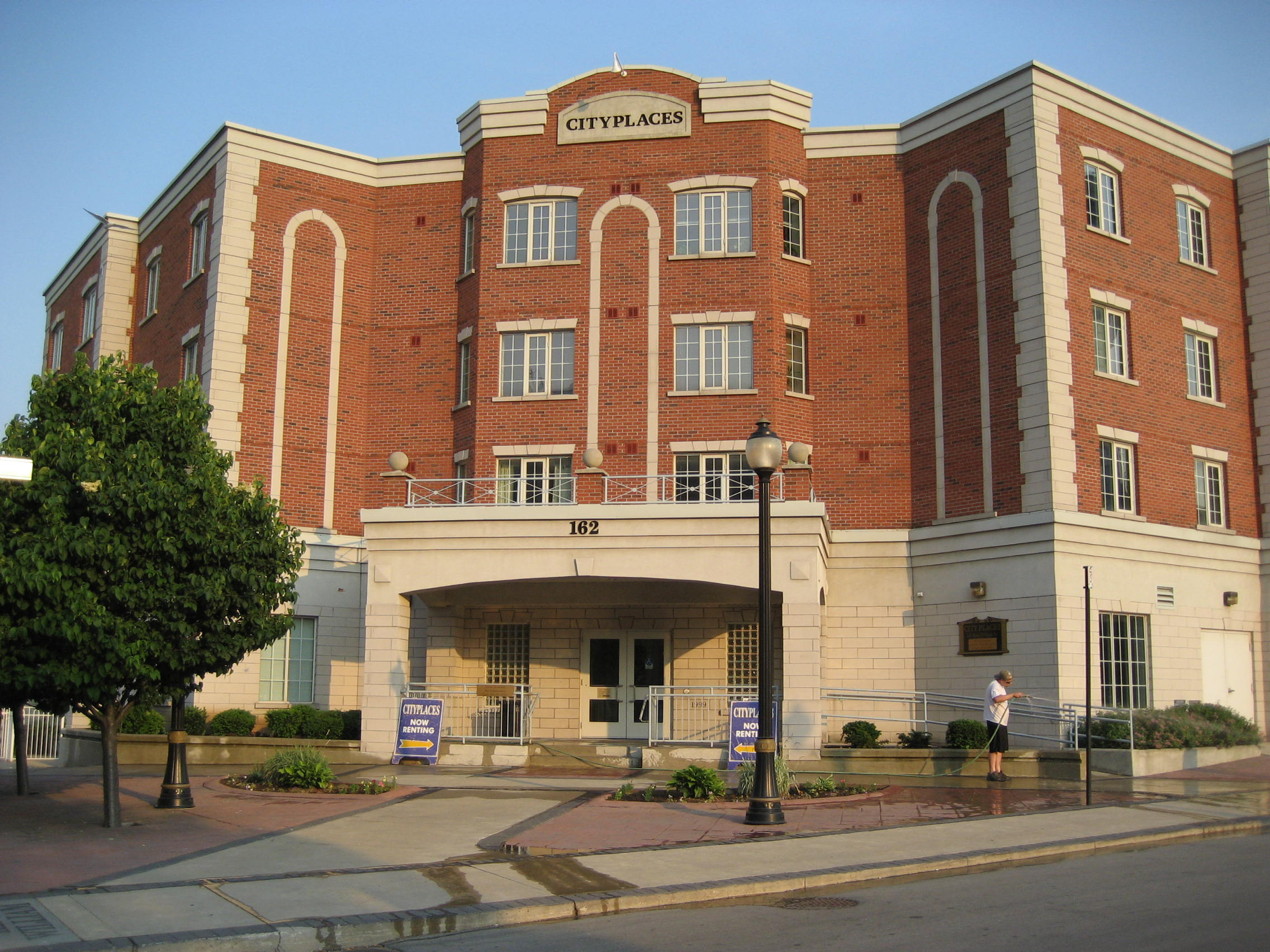
Residential Apartments

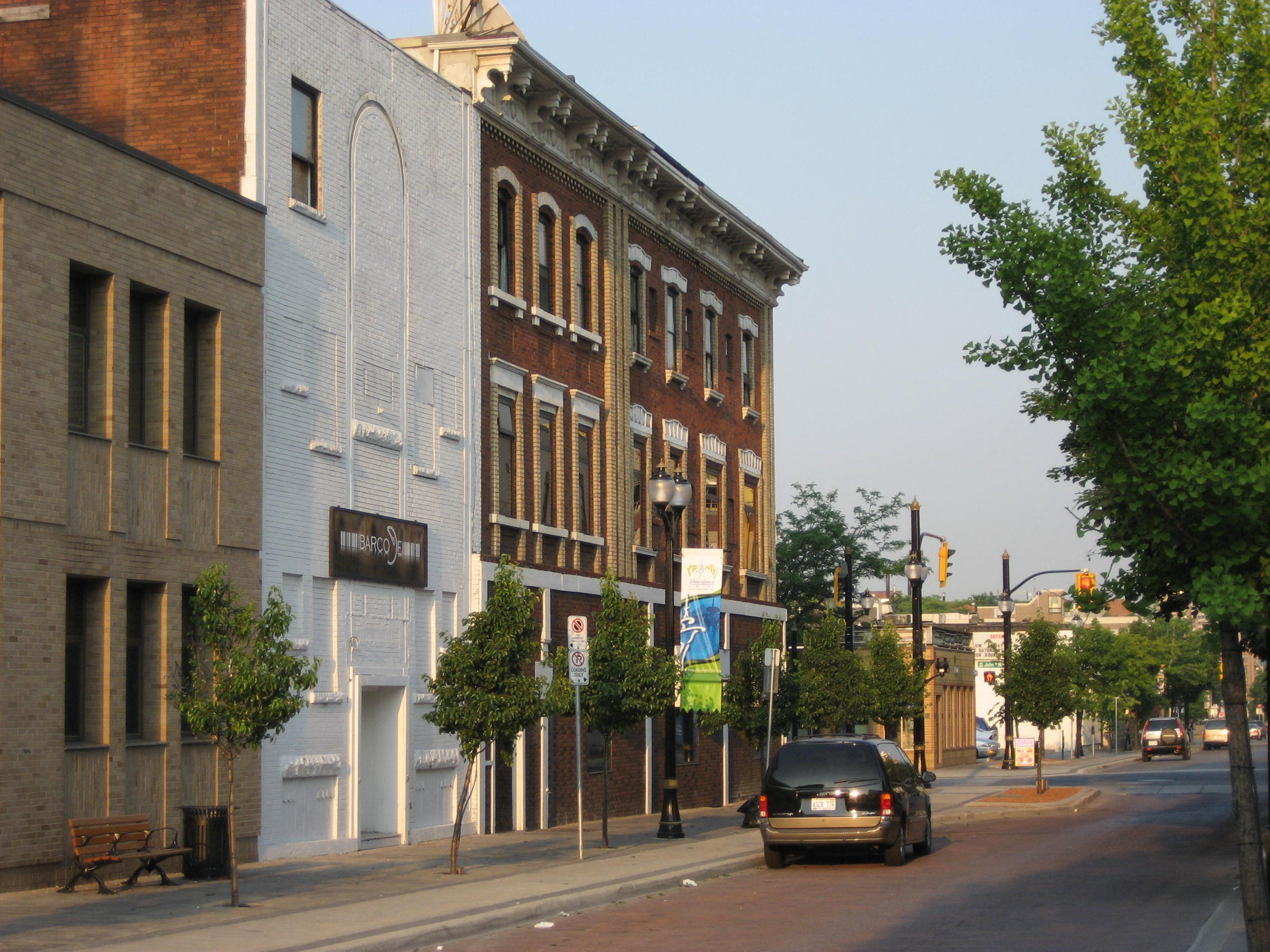
Many of downtown Hamilton's night clubs are located in this neighbourhood

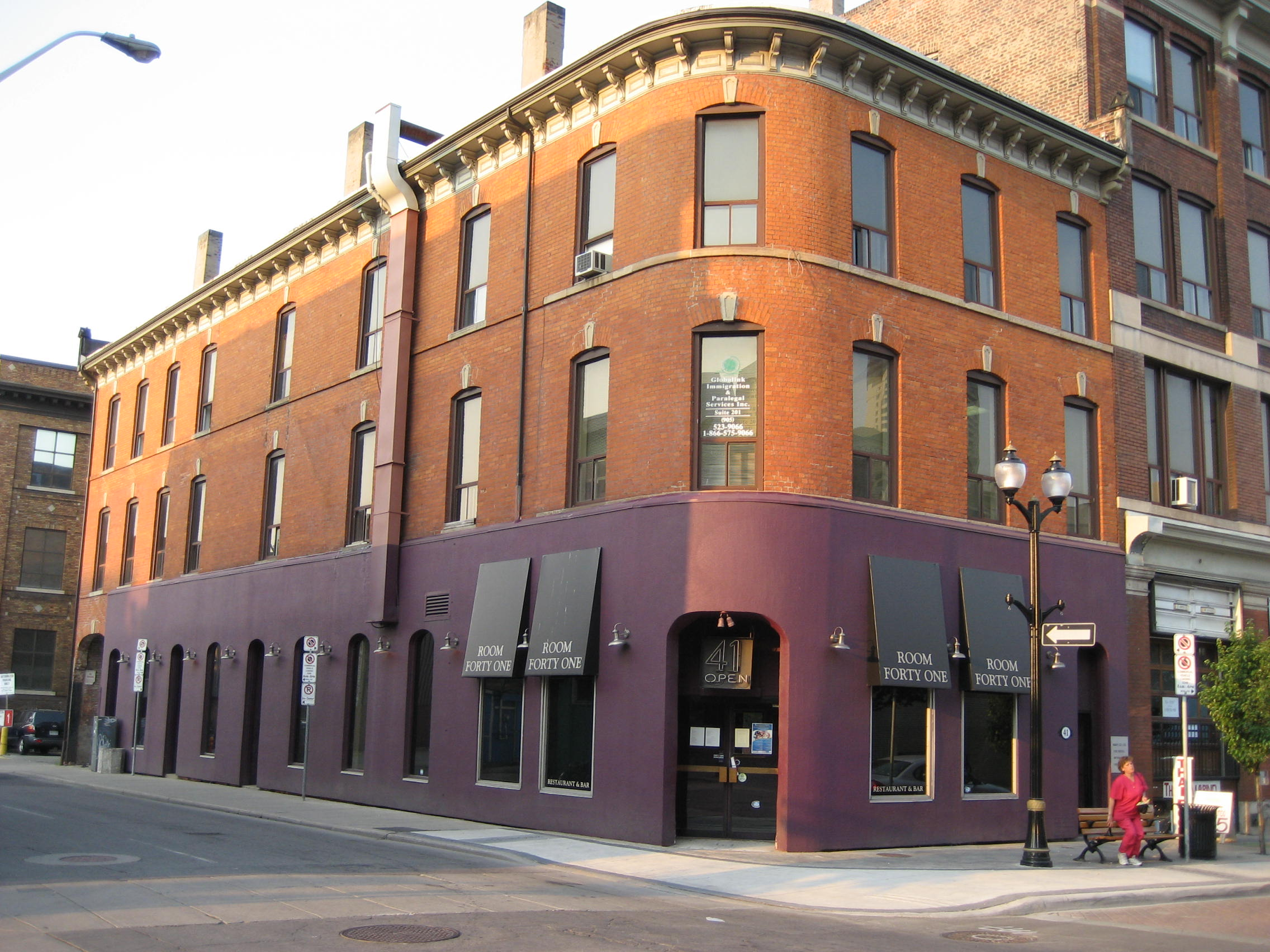
Many of the old buildings in this neighbourhood have recently been converted to restaurants & art galleries

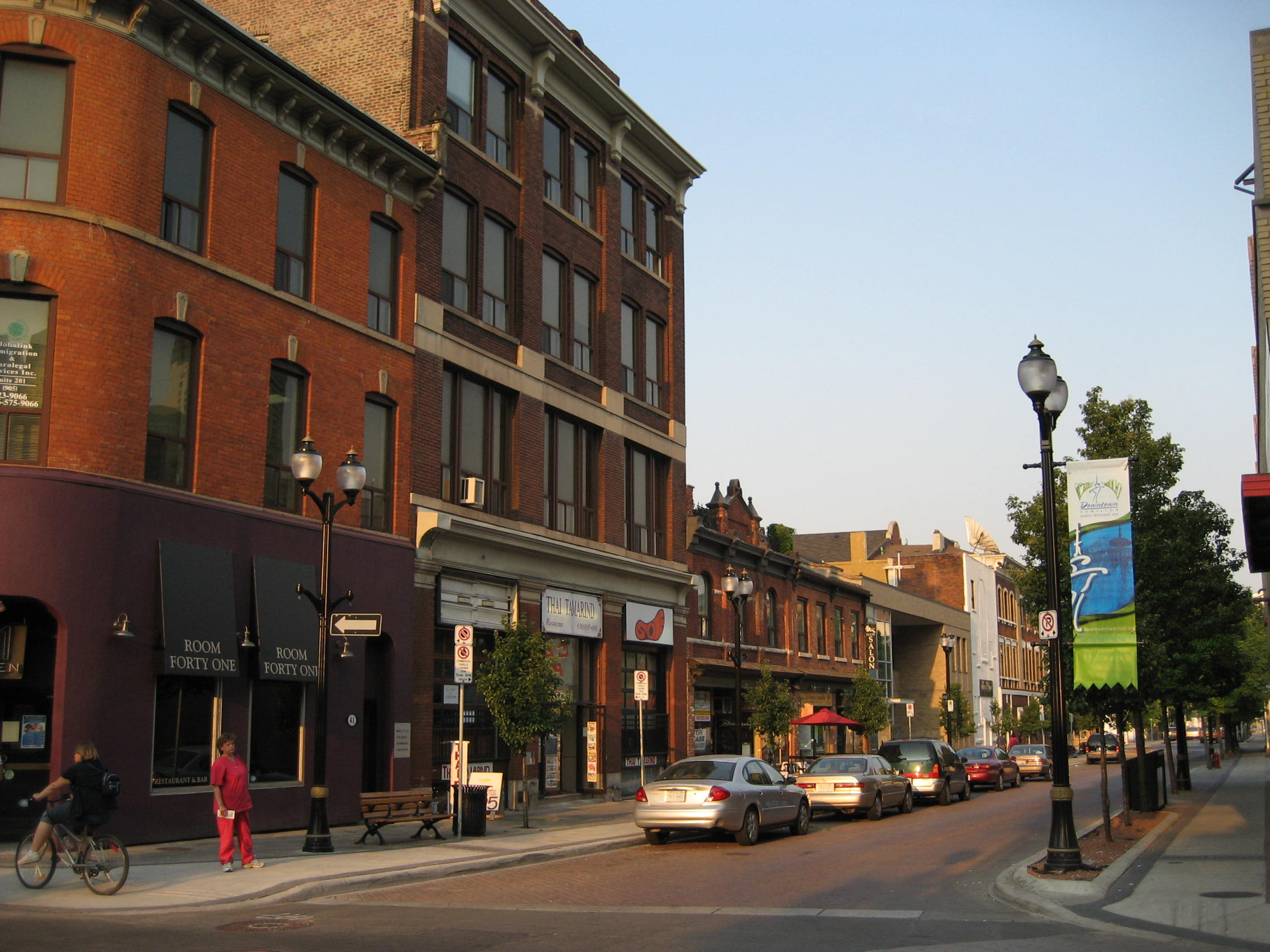
King William Street, looking East

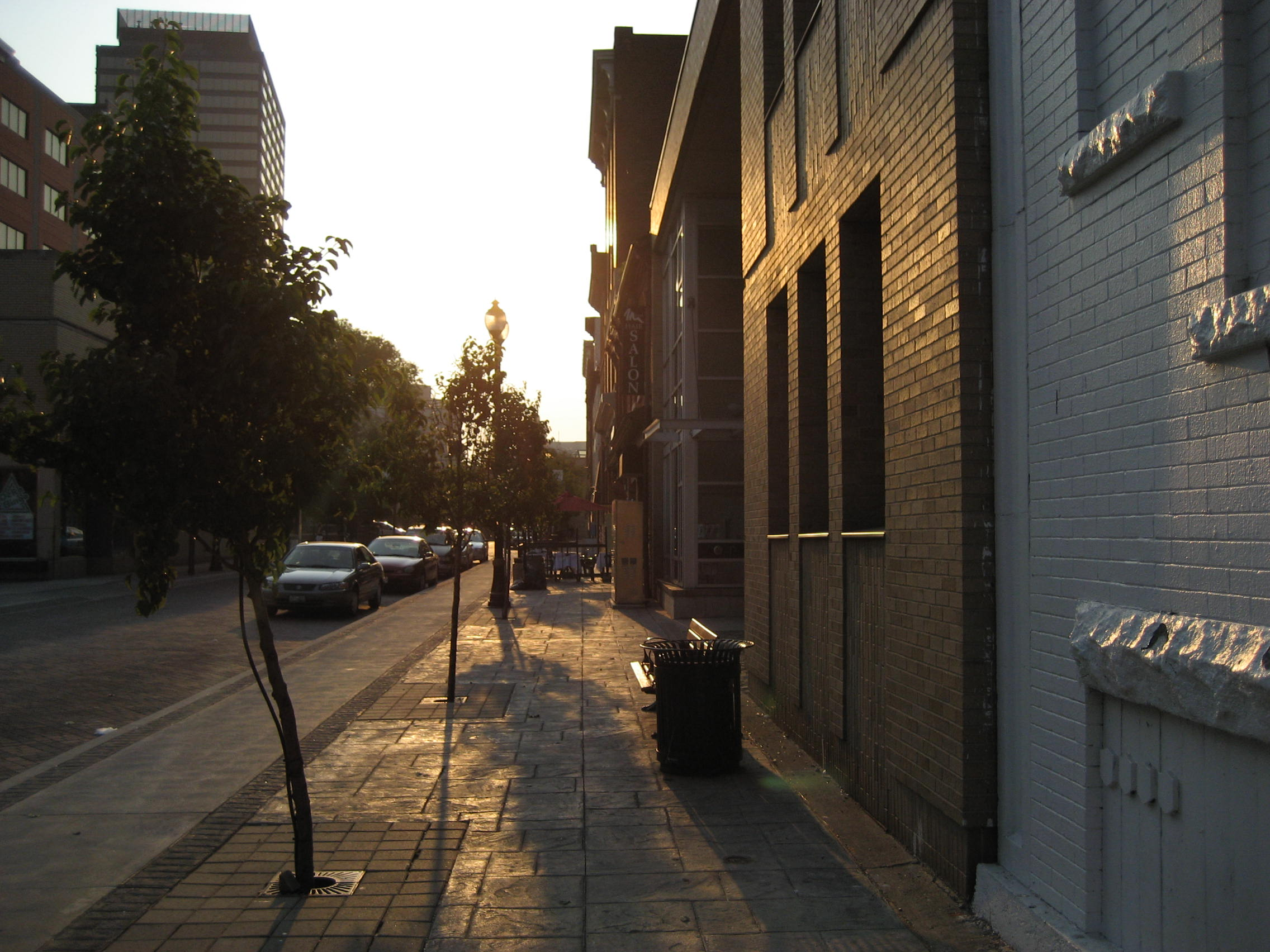
King William Street, looking West towards James Street North

Note: Listing of Landmarks from West to East.

- Hamilton City Centre (Mall, formerly the Eaton's Centre)
- Lloyd D. Jackson Square (Mall)
- Lister Block Building
- Homegrown Hamilton
- Club Absinthe
- Downtown Bingo Hall (back-end)
- Geyer Studio
- The Baltimore House
- Manta Contemporary Art Gallery
- Hamilton Central Fire Department (just north of King William Street on John Street North)
- Seventy-Seven Night Club
- The Underground, Steel City Music Venue
- Children's International Learning Centre
- Theatre Aquarius, Dofasco Centre for the Performing Arts, downtown
- Hamilton Regional Police station
- Tweedsmuir Elementary School (demolished in 2006)
- Cathedral High School

== Communities ==
Note: Listing of neighbourhoods from West to East.

- Central - The financial centre of Hamilton, Ontario
- Beasley
- Landsdale

== See also ==
- Royal eponyms in Canada
