= List of roads in Hamilton, Ontario =

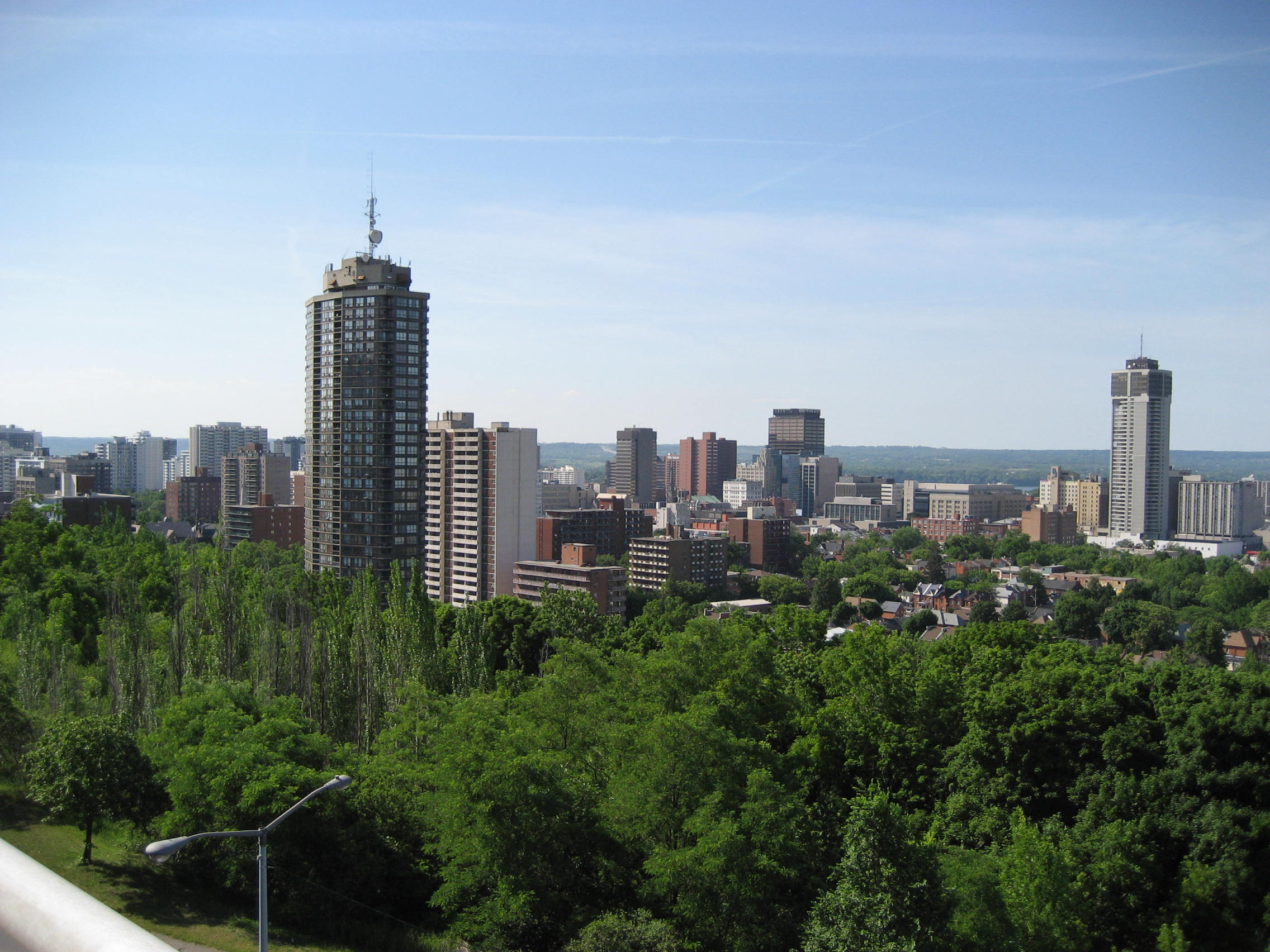
Skyline view from Jolley Cut, mountain access road

This is a List of streets in Hamilton, Ontario, many of which were named after the Loyalist families who arrived to Hamilton after the British lost the American Revolutionary War. These names include Hess, Hughson, Herkimer, Land, Beasley, Gage, Doan, Davis, Mills, Carpenter, and Brant. The Loyalists were the pioneers of Hamilton and area.

Many of the street names in Hamilton have changed over the years. James Street south of King was called Jarvis, Jackson Street was Maiden Lane, John Street was Mountain Street, Main Street east of James was Brougham Street, Hunter Street east of James was called Peel Street, Charlton Avenue West was Anderson Street, Charlton Avenue was Hannah Street, Park Street was Bond Street, Bay Street South was Bowry Street, Cannon Street was known as Henry Street, Barton Street West was Concession and Upper James Street on the mountain was known as Caledonia Road.

== Lower City (below Escarpment) ==
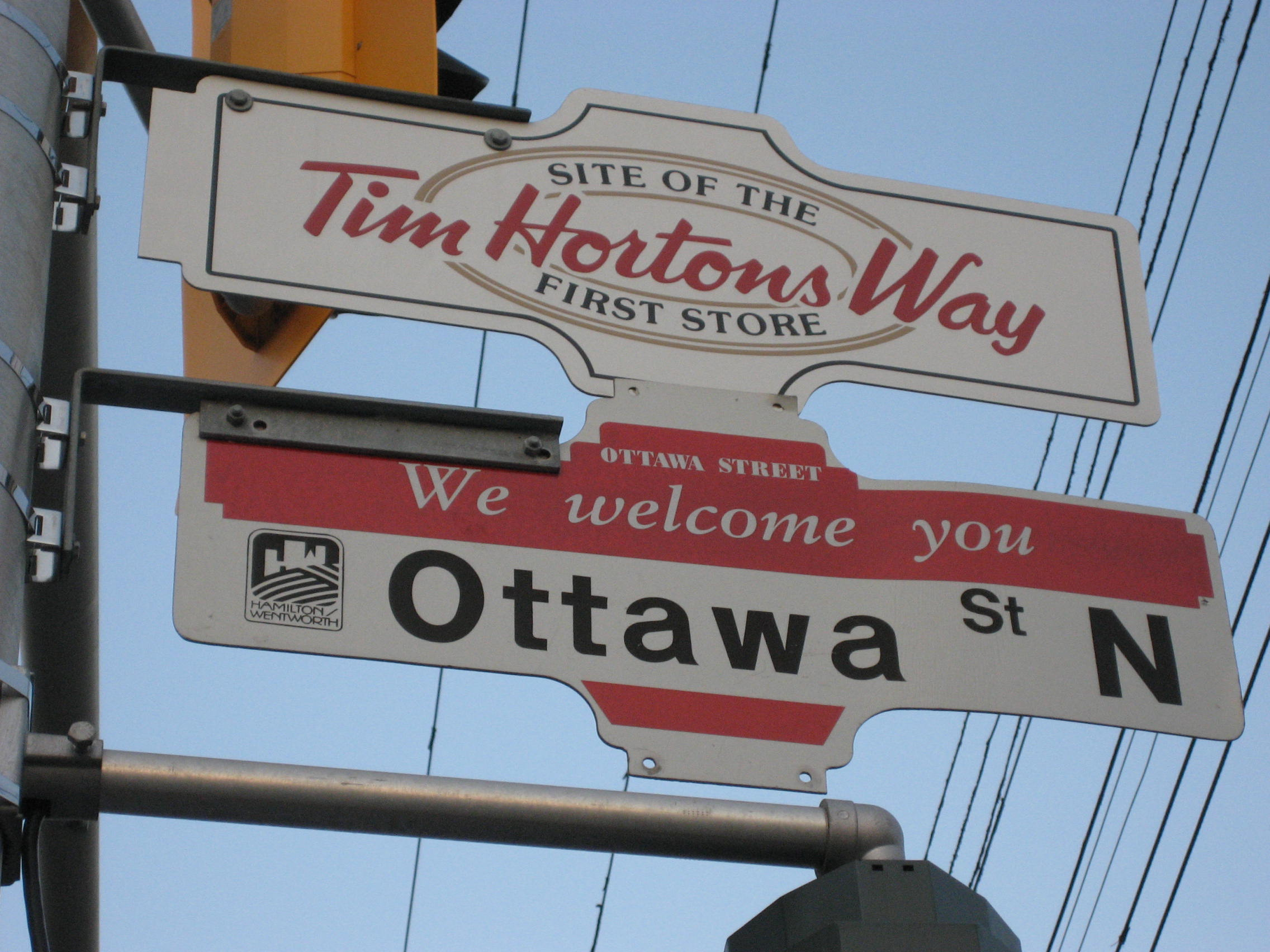

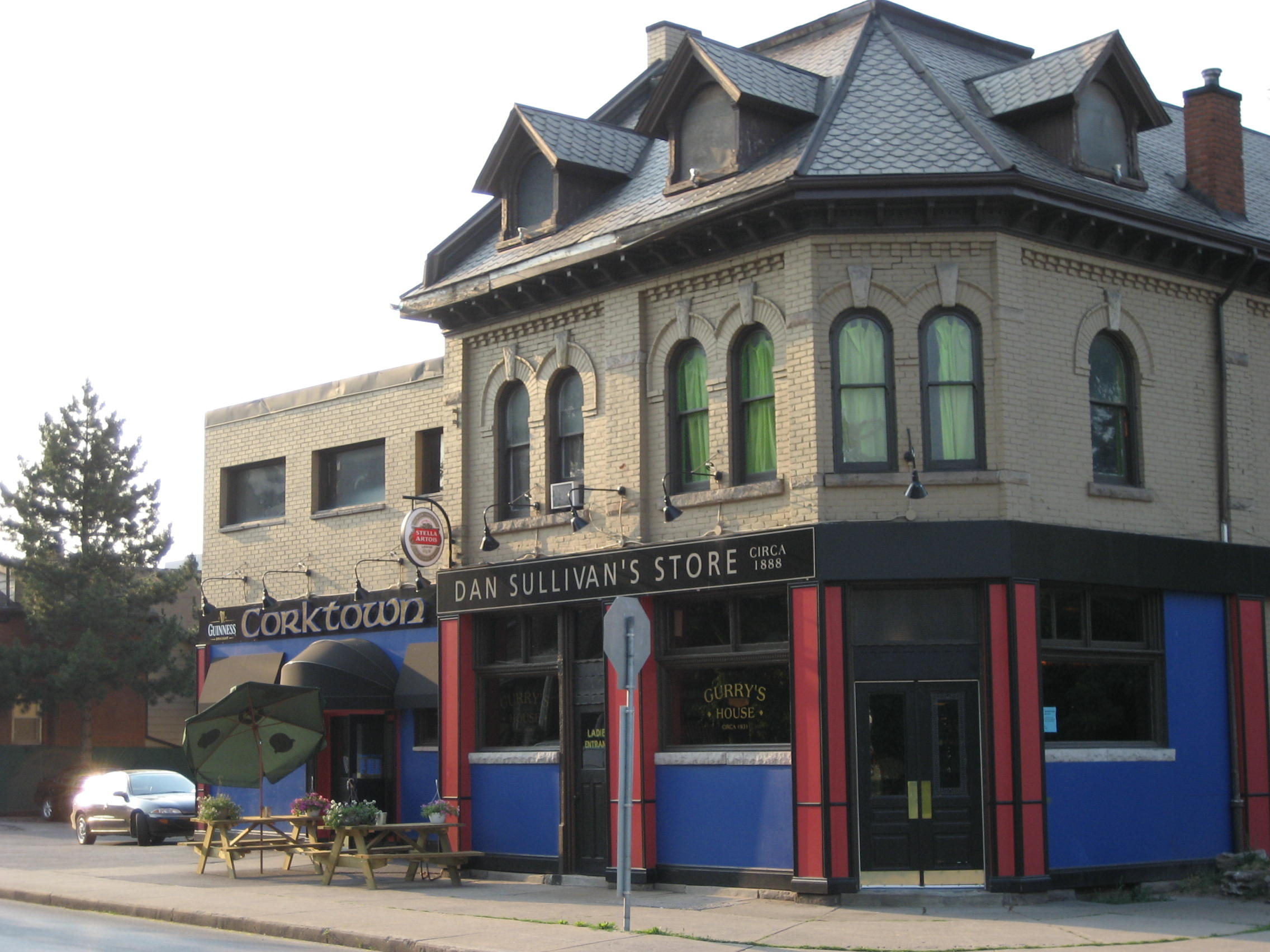
Corktown, Ferguson South, landmark

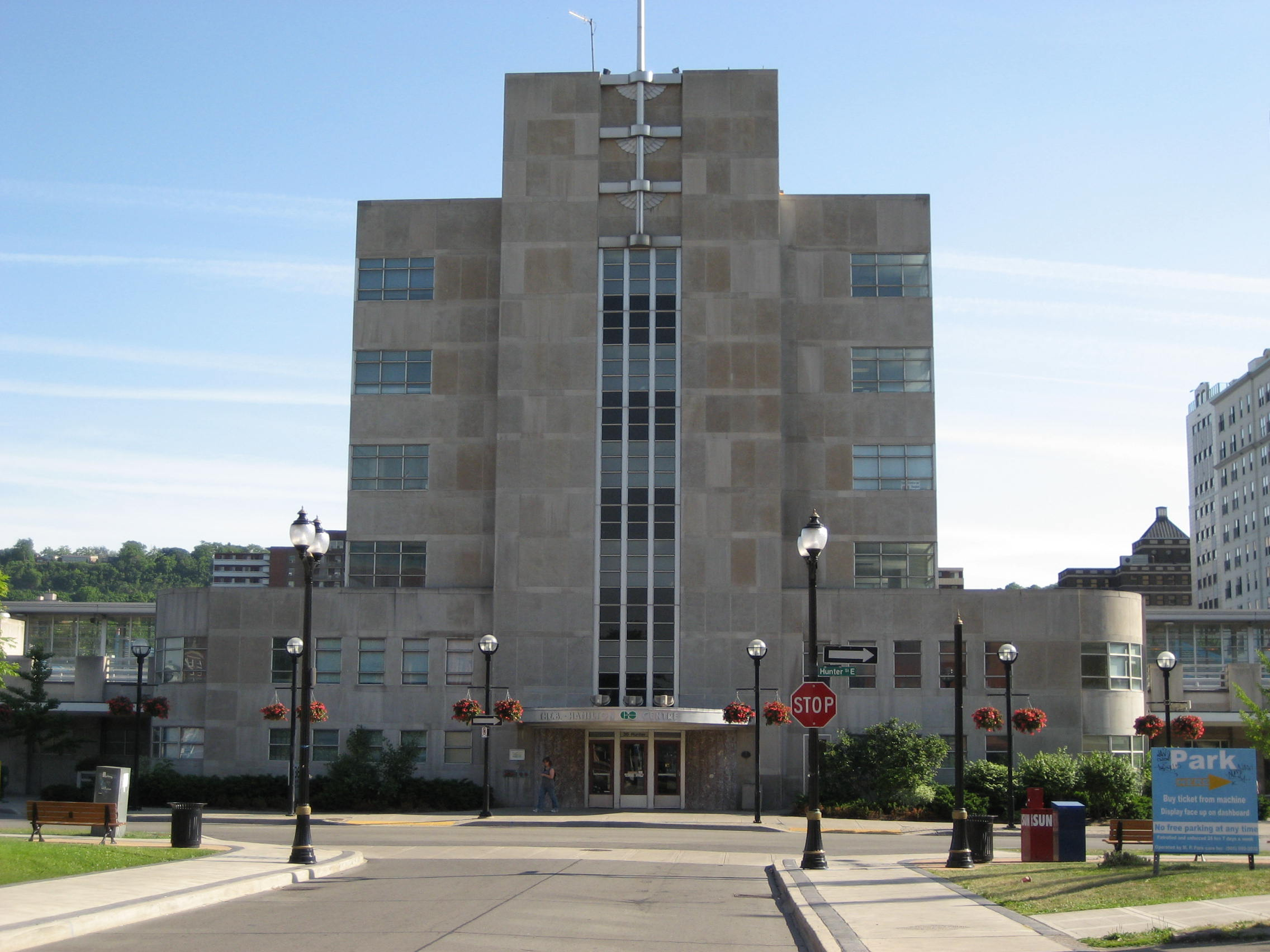
GO Transit station, Hunter Street

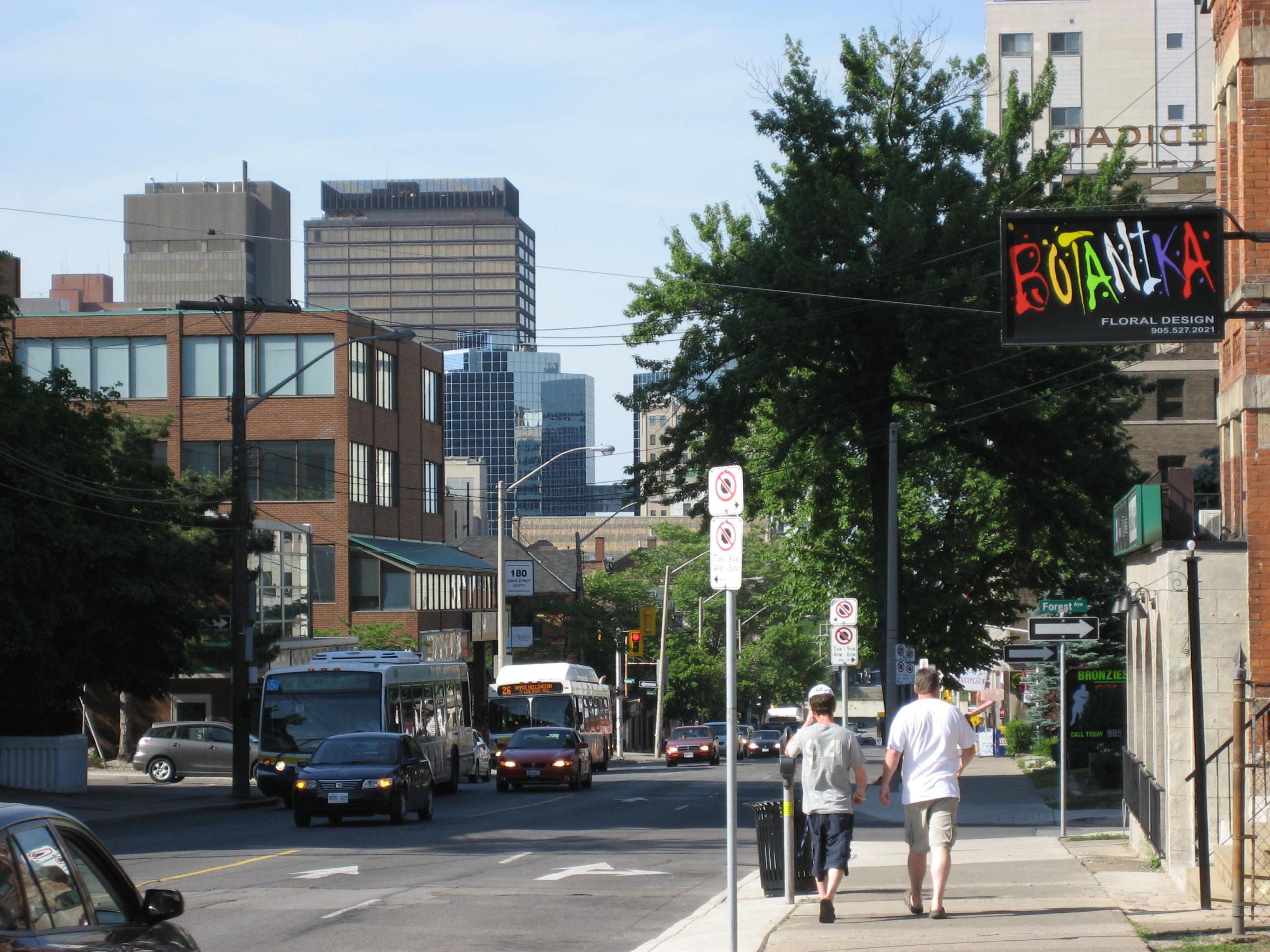
James Street South, street life

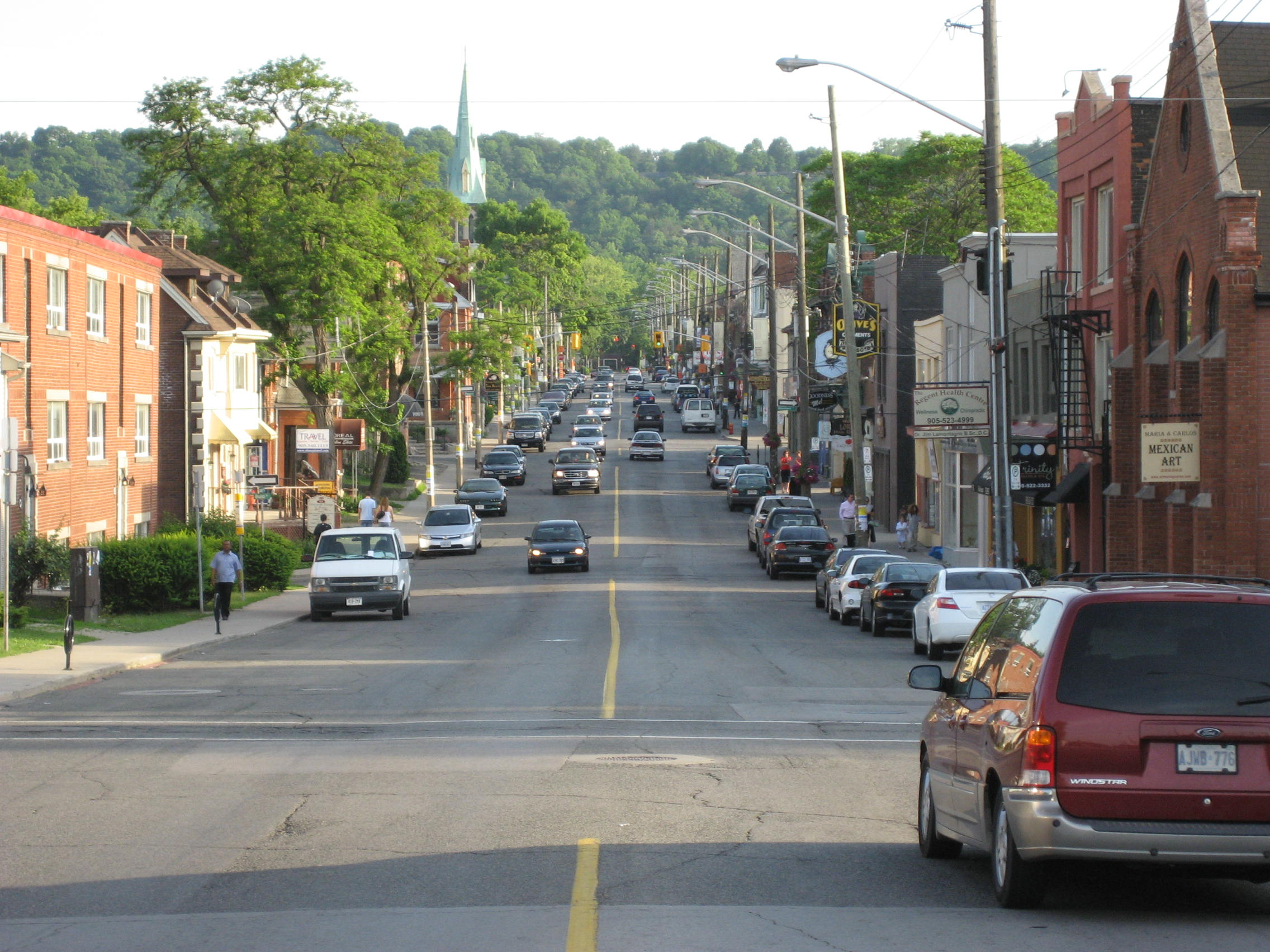
Locke Street South

- 50 Road
- Aberdeen Avenue, named after Lord Aberdeen (John Hamilton-Gordon, 1st Marquess of Aberdeen and Temair) and Lady Aberdeen (Ishbel Hamilton-Gordon, Marchioness of Aberdeen and Temair) who both lived in Hamilton on Bay Street South (1890–1898) with their four children. They presided over the opening of the Hamilton Public Library on September 16, 1890. Lord Aberdeen was appointed Governor General of Canada in 1893.
- Augusta Street, portion between Catharine Street and Ferguson Avenue was originally known as O'Reilly Street.
- Barton Street, In the early days, a part of current-day Hamilton was known as Barton township, named after a township in Lincoln County, England.
- Bay Street, derives its name from its proximity to Hamilton Harbour, which was once Burlington Bay.
- Beach Boulevard
- Burlington Street, original name was Industrial Road. It derives its name from its proximity to Hamilton Harbour, which used to be called Burlington Bay.
- Cannon Street, was originally called Henry Street. The section between Bay and James Streets was called Miles Street. The origins of the Cannon street name is unknown.
- Caroline Street, named after one of Peter Hess's daughters.
- Catharine Street, named after Nathaniel Hughson's daughter. (Hughson was one of the city founders of Hamilton). Other streets in the city were named after him and his family members. Hughson, Rebecca (wife) and James (son).
- Centennial Parkway
- Charlton Avenue named after Benjamin Ernest Charlton, (1835–1901), teacher, manufacturer, politician and mayor of Hamilton. Charlton Avenue was originally named Hannah Street.
- Cochrane Road, road that leads to King's Forest Park from the Queenston Traffic Circle.
- Cootes Drive, named linked to Cootes Paradise for which the road travels through
- Dundurn Street, originated with Sir Allan MacNab who named his home Dundurn Castle and its landscaped grounds Dundurn Park after his family's ancestral home in Dundurn, Perthshire, Scotland. Originally Dundurn Street, South of King Street West was known as Garth Street up to 1913. Dundurn derives from two Gaelic words frequently incorrectly cited as meaning "the fort on the water." Dundurn correctly derives from the Gaelic words Dùn Dórn (pl. Dùn Dùirn) meaning "fort of the fist" due to the fact that it was located on top of a hill shaped like a fist.
- Ferguson Avenue, site of the historic Ferguson train station. Ferguson Avenue south of Main Street used to be called Cherry Street. Street named for settler Peter Ferguson
- Fruitland Road
- Gage Avenue, and Upper Gage Avenue are named after James Gage, a lumber merchant and his uncle William Gage, a farmer. Together James and William owned a farm that was the site of the Battle of Stoney Creek during the War of 1812. The wounded were treated inside their home and they were both awarded compensation for it by the government.
- Governor's Road
- Gray Road
- Green Road
- Herkimer Street, named after Mary Herkimer, the daughter of United Empire Loyalist Johan Host Herkimer. Mary Herkimer married Robert Hamilton of Queenston and thereby became the stepmother of John George Hamilton, the founder of the city of Hamilton, Ontario. When George Hamilton was building the city that bears his name in the early 1800s, he named one of the new streets Herkimer Street in her honor.[1]
- Hess Street, named after Peter Hess, (1779–1855), farmer, landowner. Peter Street in Hamilton also named after him as well as Caroline Street named after one of his daughters. also the site of Hess Village.
- Hughson Street, named after Nathaniel Hughson, (1755–1837), farmer, hotel owner, and Loyalist who moved to Canada following the American Revolution, one of the city founders. Other streets in the city were named after his family members: James, Rebecca and Catharine.
- Hunter Street, named after Peter Hunter Hamilton, (1800–1857), landowner and businessman, and half brother of city founder George Hamilton. Originally, sections of Hunter Street were called William Street after King William IV and Peel Street after the British PM, Sir Robert Peel.
- Jackson Street, named after Edward Jackson, (1799–1872), tinware manufacturer. Originally Jackson Street was called Tyburn Street and later Maiden Lane. It is now named after Edward Jackson.
- James Street, named after one of Nathaniel Hughson's sons. Hughson was one of the founders of Hamilton along with George Hamilton and James Durand. Originally, James Street was called Lake Road because it was the road that led to Lake Ontario to the north. It was then renamed Jarvis Street after city founder George Hamilton's wife (Maria Jarvis) and then finally changed to its present-day James. James Hughson (1797-1849)
- John Street, originally known as Mountain Road and named for early settler family
- Kenilworth Avenue
- King Street (Hamilton), follows the path of an old Indian Trail and was named after King George III.
- King Street (Dundas) (no relation to Hamilton's King Street)
- King William Street named for William IV of the United Kingdom.
- Lake Avenue, the hub of early Stoney Creek was the intersection of Lake Avenue and King Street.
- Locke Street. Originally called Lock Street by 1870 the spelling was standardized to Locke. North of King Street West was known as Railway Street because it ran to the Great Western Railway yards.
- MacNab Street, named after Allan McNab, (1798–1862), Sir. Allan Napier McNab soldier, lawyer, businessman, knight and former Prime Minister of Upper Canada.
- Main Street, originally called Court Street, after the first courthouse that stood on it. It is now called Main Street because it formed the main concession line of Barton Township.
- Nash Road, named after the Nash farm, which was a prominent feature of Saltfleet
- Ottawa Street, commercial portion also known as Hamilton's Textile District.
- Parkdale Avenue
- Quigley Road
- Queen Street, named after Queen Caroline of Brunswick, wife of King George IV.
- Queenston Road, the original "Hamilton & Queenston Provincial Highway", no. 8.
- Sherman Avenue, originally called Shearman Avenue which was named after the first land assessor of the district, nothing more is known of Shearman. Later the name was changed to Sherman Avenue after brothers Clifton Sherman, (1872–1955) and Frank Sherman, (1887–1967), who founded Dominion Foundries and Steel (later Dofasco) in 1912.
- Victoria Avenue, named after Queen Victoria.
- Wentworth Street, named after Sir John Wentworth, lieutenant-governor of Nova Scotia, from 1792 to 1808.
- Wellington Street, originally Wellington Street was called Lovers' Lane.
- Wilson Street (Hamilton), Wilson Street between James Street and Mary Street was originally called Gore Street after the District of Gore. Wilson Street was named after Hugh B. Wilson, a local landowner who opened a survey on the street.
- Woodward Avenue
- York Boulevard, was part of the military road that connected the chain stations lying between Kingston and the Niagara River, this road was the main route to York (Toronto). As a result, it became known as York Street. In 1976, the road was closed for construction, widened and renamed York Boulevard November 29, 1976.

== Mountain (Escarpment) ==
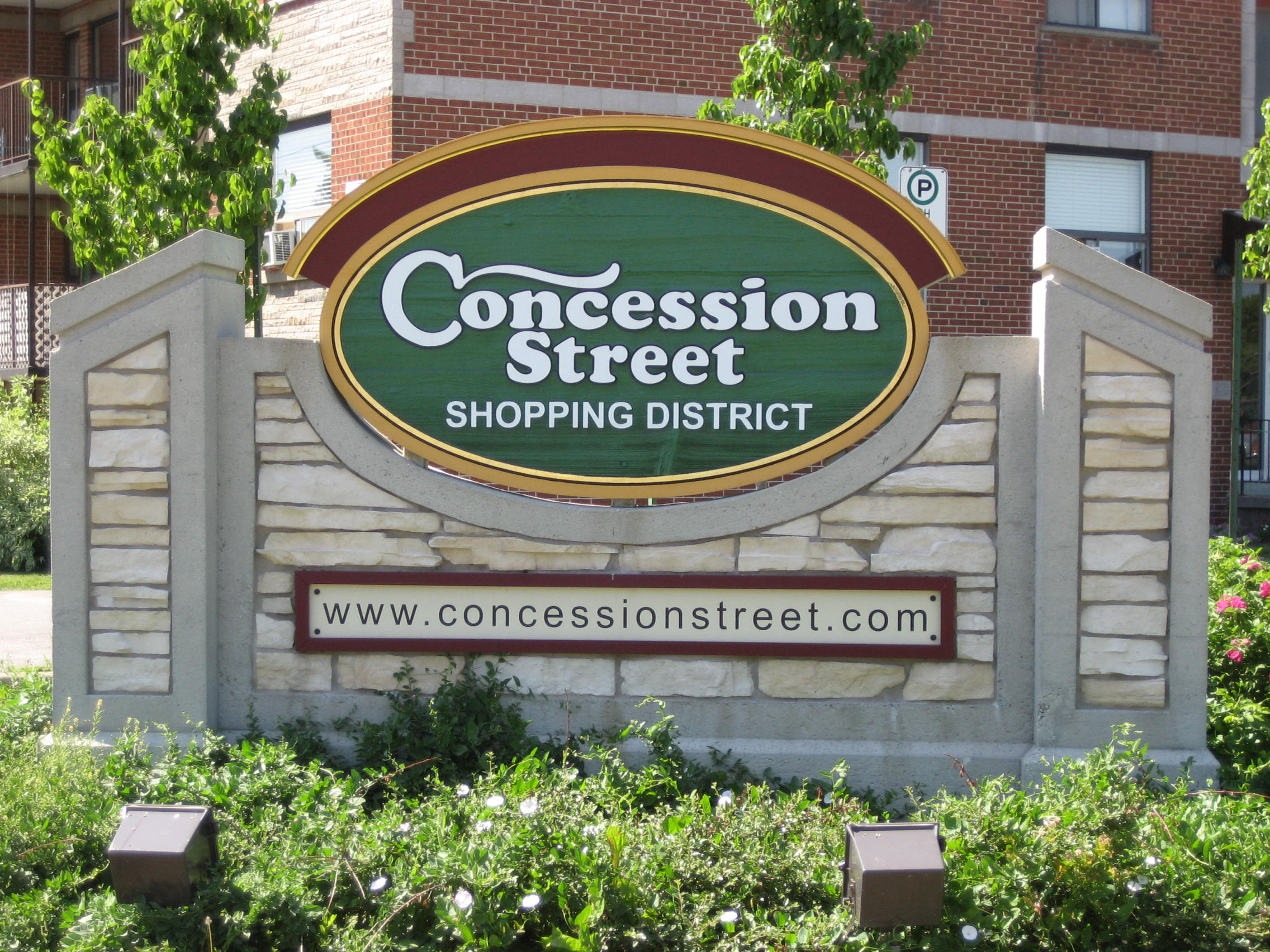

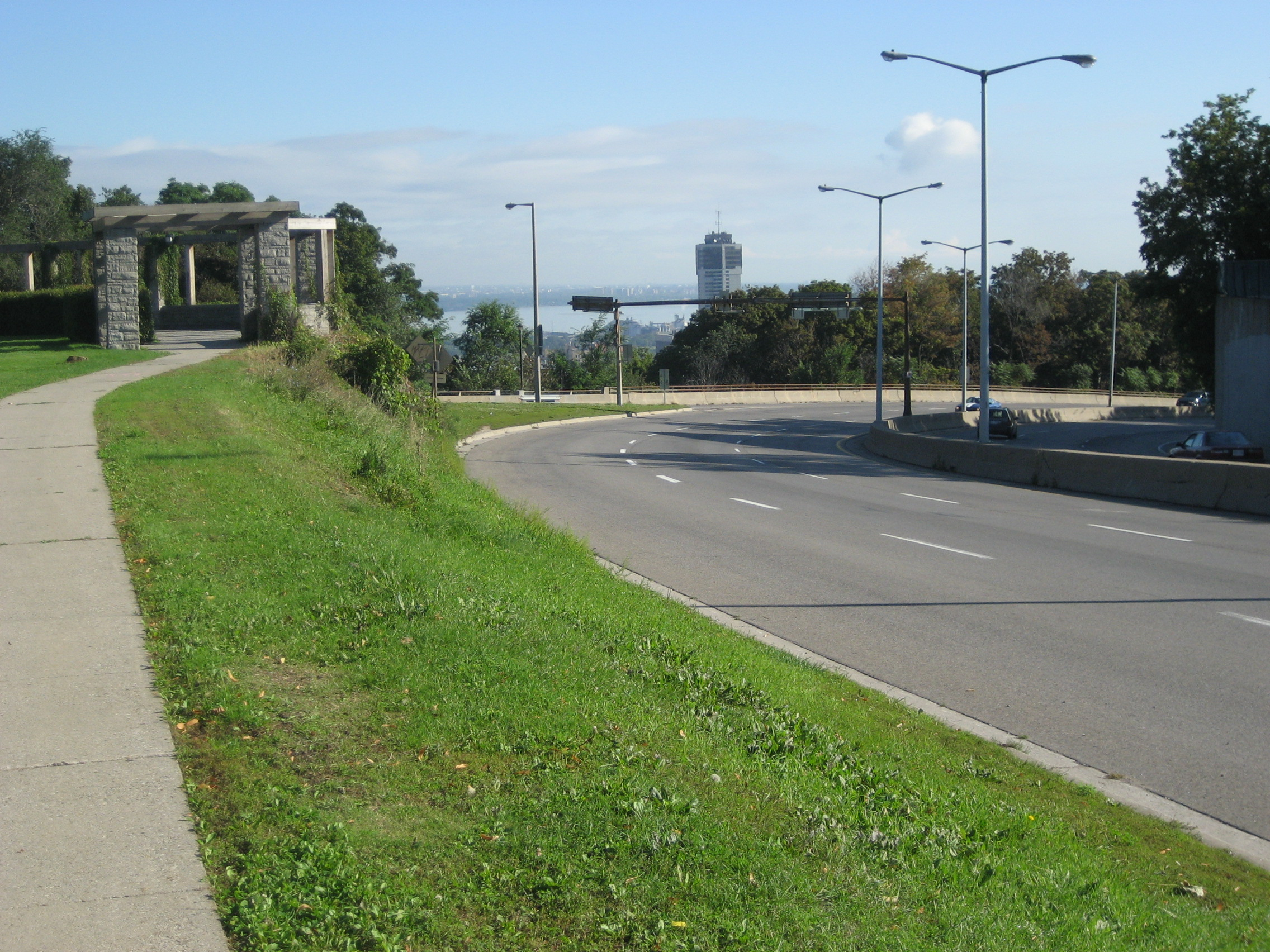
Upper James Street / Claremont Access, original site of West-end Incline Railway

- Airport Road, named for proximity to John C. Munro Hamilton International Airport.
- Concession Street, the oldest settlement area on Hamilton Mountain and once an African-American neighbourhood settled by escaped slaves from the United States who came to the area along the Underground Railroad. Originally known as Stone Road and changed to Concession Street in 1909, it was a separate community from the lower city and known as Mount Hamilton. By 1891 land north of Concession Street were annexed by the city and were serviced with water, sewers and sidewalks. Aberdeen Avenue in the Lower City was originally known as Concession Street.
- Dartnall Road
- Dickenson Road, named after John Dickenson, politician and co-founder of Cataract Power Company who first brought electricity from DeCew Falls to Hamilton. Dickenson's great grandson Herb Dickenson played for the New York Rangers in the NHL.
- Fennell Avenue, named after Joseph Fennell, (1835–1919), Anglican priest.
- Fiddlers Green Road, named after a legend of a group of fiddlers that would gather nearby Fiddler's Green Inn with their violins for music and dancing.
- Garner Road, named after William B. Garner who operated a blacksmith shop on the intersection with Southcote Road.
- Garth Street notably does not follow the Upper naming convention of escarpment north-south arterials, despite aligning with Dundurn Street. It was instead named Garth, which was the original name of Dundurn Street, to preserve the heritage.
- Glancaster Road
- Golf Links Road, constructed to reach Hamilton Golf and Country Club.
- Greenhill Avenue
- Highland Park
- Limeridge Road, named after a limestone ridge that can be seen today in the rock cuts running parallel to the Lincoln M. Alexander Parkway. The road was once a through street, but now exists as four separate streets which do not connect due to the onramps and offramps of the aforementioned freeway.
- Mohawk Road, the road follows the route of the Great Trail, a network of footpaths created by Algonquian and Iroquoian-speaking First Nations peoples prior to the arrival of Europe colonists in North America.
- Mount Albion Road
- Mountain Brow Boulevard
- Mud Street, the name originates from the 18th century and was descriptive of the road's condition.
- Nebo Road
- Ridge Road, which roughly follows the escarpment.
- Rymal Road, named after William Rymal, (1759–1852), farmer and one of earliest settlers on the Hamilton mountain.
- Sanatorium Road, named for its proximity to Chedoke Hospital, which used to be the Mountain Sanatorium, a tuberculosis sanatorium.
- Scenic Drive
- Stone Church Road named after the Barton Stone Church on the corner of Upper James Street.
- Trinity Church Road
- Twenty Road, takes its name from Twenty Mile Creek in the northwest part of Glanbrook.
- Upper Centennial Parkway
- Upper Gage Avenue (see Gage Avenue)
- Upper James Street, (see James Street), Originally called Caledonia Road because it led to Caledonia, Ontario.
- Upper Kenilworth Avenue
- Upper Ottawa Street
- Upper Paradise Road, named after Paradise Road, a residential street in Westdale near Coote's Paradise
- Upper Sherman Avenue (See Sherman Avenue)
- Upper Wentworth Street (see Wentworth Street)
- Upper Wellington Street (see Wellington Street)
- West 5th Street
- White Church Road
- Wilson Street (Ancaster), no relation to Wilson Street (Hamilton)
