= Catharine Street =

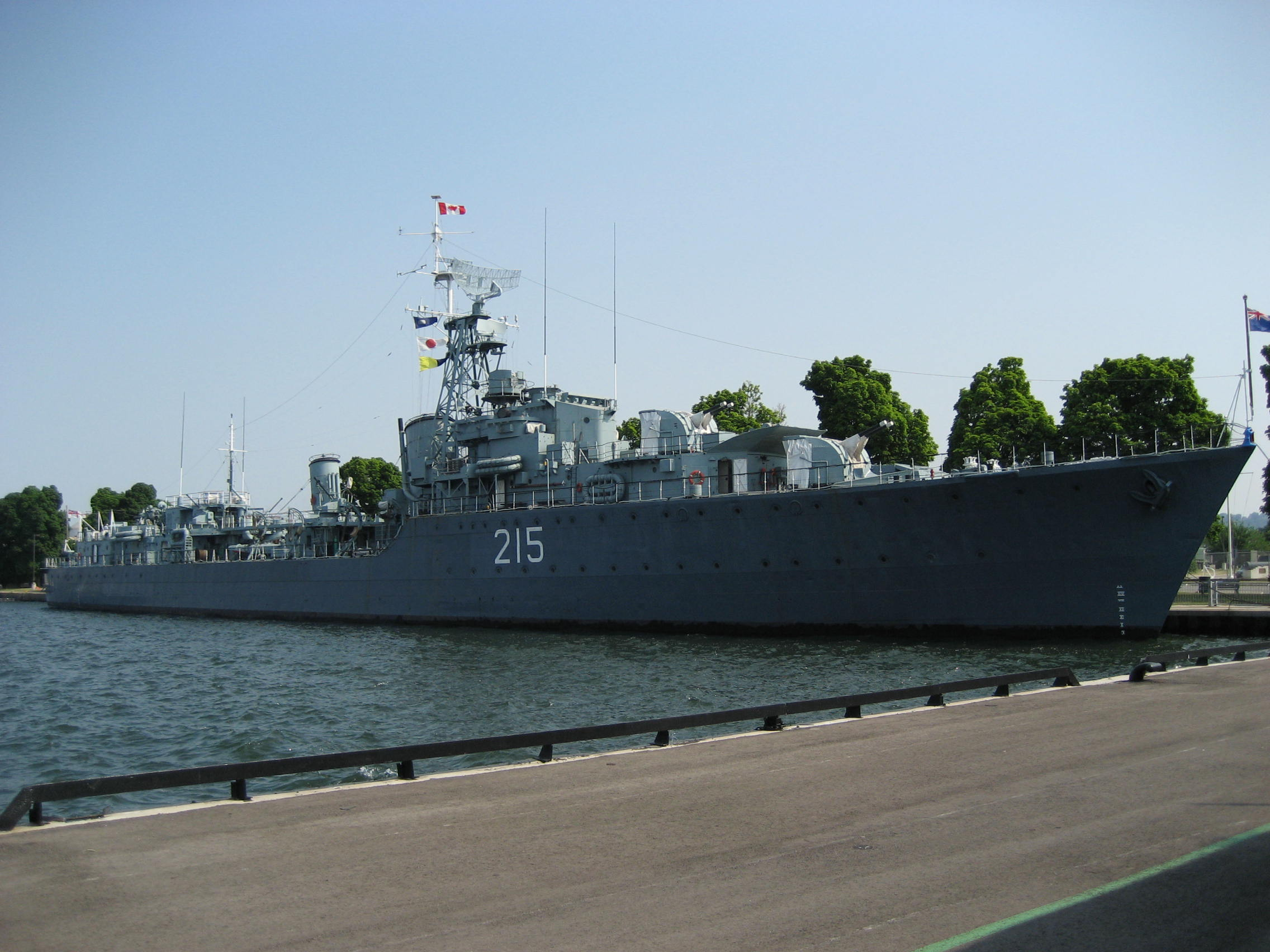
HMCS Haida, Pier 9

Catharine Street is a Lower City collector road in Hamilton, Ontario, Canada. It starts off at Charlton Avenue East at Woolverton Park in the Corktown neighbourhood as a one-way street (southbound), tunnels underneath the Hunter Street Railway bridge and stretches up to Barton Street East where it then turns two-way and cutoff by the CN Railway lines that cut through Strachan Street Park one block north past Barton. Catharine Street then resumes again on Strachan Street East, north of the Park again as a two-way road for 3 blocks and interrupted again at Picton Street East, the site of St. Lawrence Elementary School and resumes again north of this property on Macauley Street East, again as a two-way street for another 3 blocks where it's interrupted for a third time at Brock Street, the site of Eastwood Park and Eastwood Arena. Catherine Street resumes again north of Eastwood Park on Guise Street East and ends at the city's North End waterfront, the site of a Royal Canadian Navy base and Pier 9.

== History ==
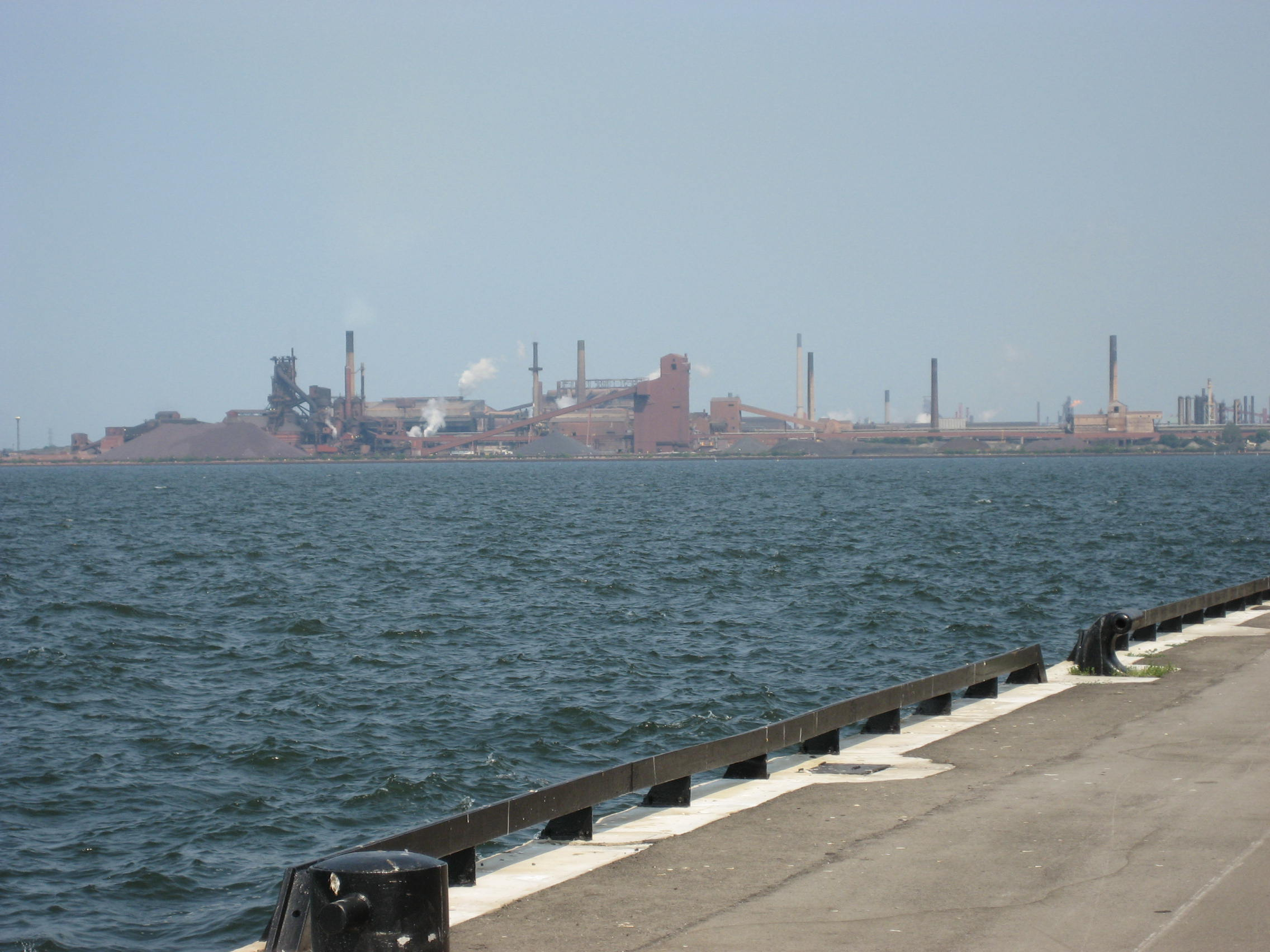
Stelco in background, view from Pier 9

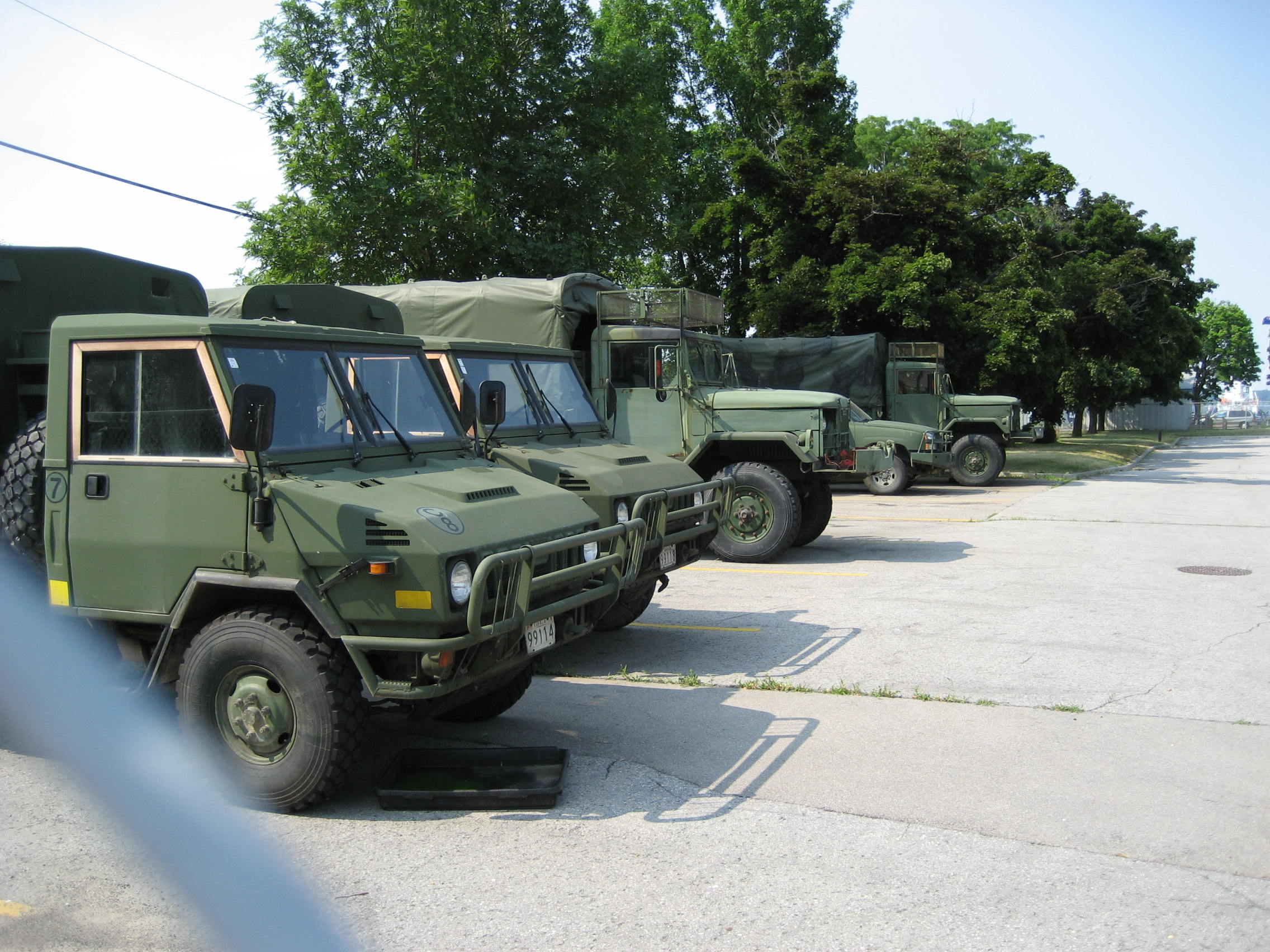
HMCS Star Naval Reserve Division, Pier 9

Catharine Street was named after Nathaniel Hughson's daughter. Hughson was one of the city founders of Hamilton. Other streets in the city were named after him and his family members, Hughson Street, Rebecca Street (wife) and James Street (son).

In 1898, The "Five Johns", (John Patterson, John Dickenson, John Morison Gibson, John Moodie, Sr. and John Sutherland), form The Cataract Power Co. Ltd. introducing electric power to Hamilton in 1898. On August 25, 1898, power was sent twenty seven miles from DeCew Falls, St. Catharines, using water from the old Welland Canal. New industries, such as the forerunners of the Steel Co. of Canada (Stelco) and Canadian Westinghouse, were attracted here by the cheaper, more efficient power. One time this Company controlled hydro power from Brantford to St. Catharines, including the Hamilton Street Railway and the area's radial lines. Back then the city's nickname was "The Electric City." Then in 1907 they erected The Terminal Station building on the southeast corner of Catharine and King Streets, where the present day Terminal Towers stand. Prior to this, in 1868, the Wanzer Sewing Machine Company was based here employing more than 250 workers.

The Pantages Theatre opened up in 1921 on King Street, (between Catharine Street and Mary Street), with a seating capacity of 3,500 made it the largest theatre in Canada at the time. In 1930 it was renamed The Palace Theatre. It closed down in 1972. Hamilton one time was home to many Grand Theatres, all of which are no longer in existence. These include, Grand Opera House (James Street North), Savoy Theatre (Merrick Street), Temple Theatre (behind the Terminal Building on King Street), Lyric Theatre (Mary Street) and The Loews Theatre renamed later to The Capitol (King Street East).

In 1974, Hamilton's tallest building; Landmark Place, (formerly known as the Century 21 building) was completed. 43 stories/ 127.0 metres in height. It is also the tallest residential building in Canada outside of Toronto as of January 10, 2007.

On August 30, 2003, the 60th anniversary of her commissioning into the Royal Canadian Navy, HMCS Haida (Canada's most famous warship and the last remaining Tribal Class in the world) was moved to the city of Hamilton, Ontario by Parks Canada where she has become a focal point of a revitalized waterfront.

== Landmarks ==
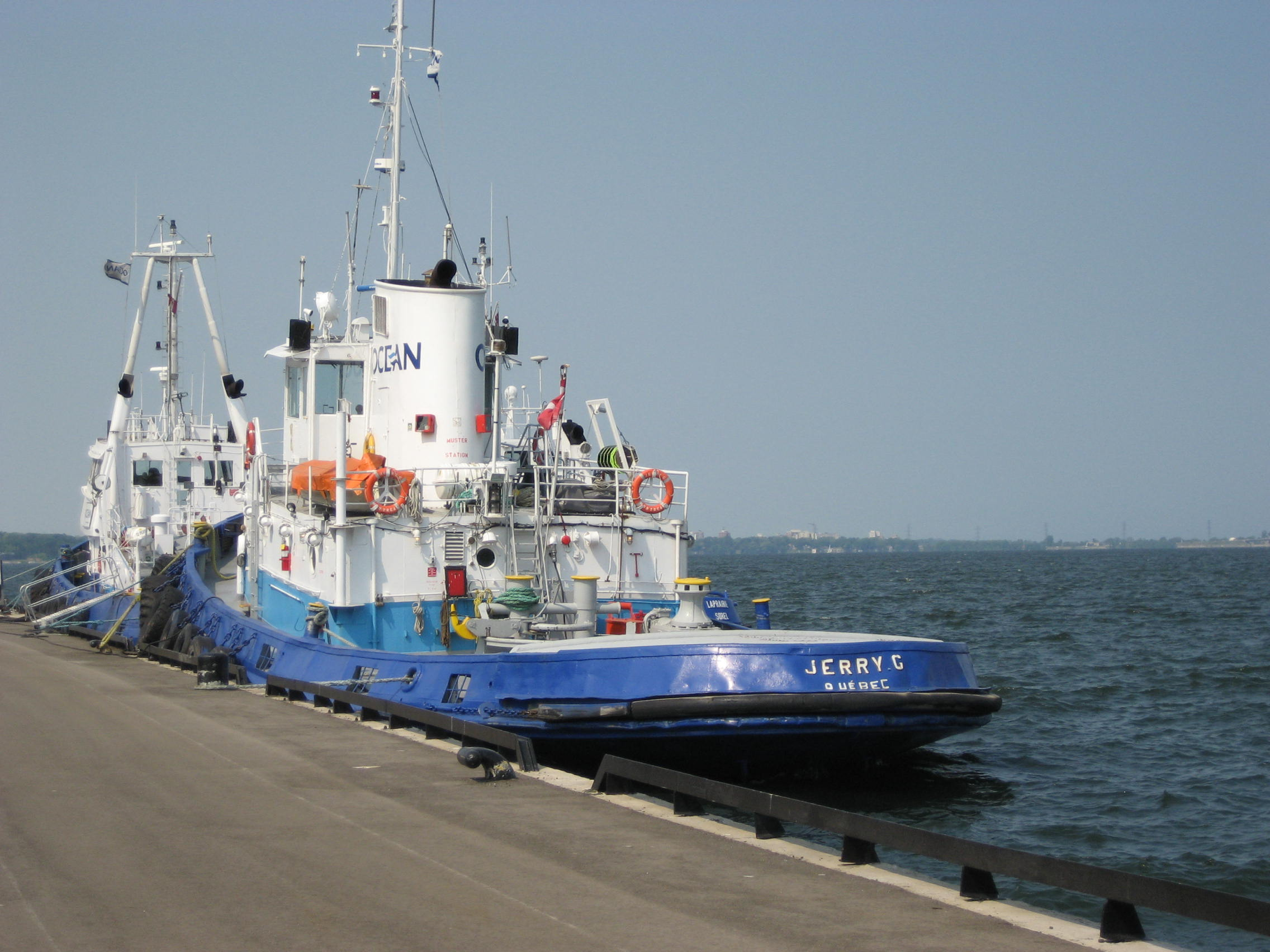
Pier 9

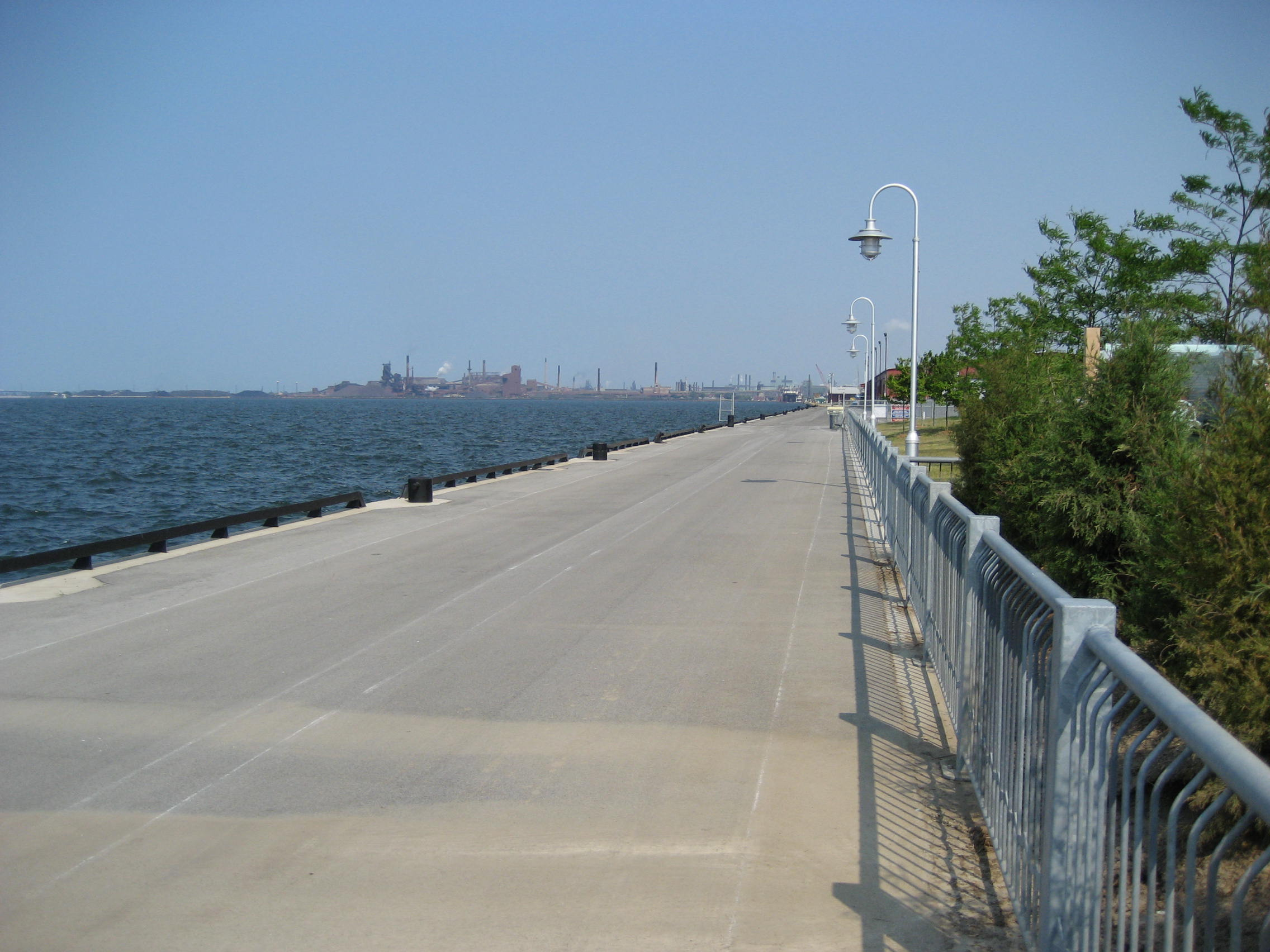
Waterfront Trail, Pier 8 connecting to Pier 9

Note: Listing of Landmarks from North to South.

- Pier 9
- Royal Canadian Navy, Army and Sea Cadets
  - 31 Lion
  - 2347 Argyll & Sutherland Highlanders
  - 2814 Hamilton SVC Btn.
- HMCS Haida National Historic Site, historic naval ship; Canada's most famous warship and the last remaining Tribal Class in the world.
- Eastwood Park/ Eastwood Arena
- Canadian National railway tracks, (Catharine Street interrupted here and resumes again north of the tracks)
- St. Lawrence Elementary School
- Econo Storage & Rental
- Hamilton Downtown Mosque
- Townsview Lifecare Retirement Home
- Hamilton Plaza (hotel)
- Landmark Place (Hamilton's tallest building)
- Oakland Square (shopping centre)
- 141 Catharine St S (Condominium complex)
- Woolverton Park

== Communities ==
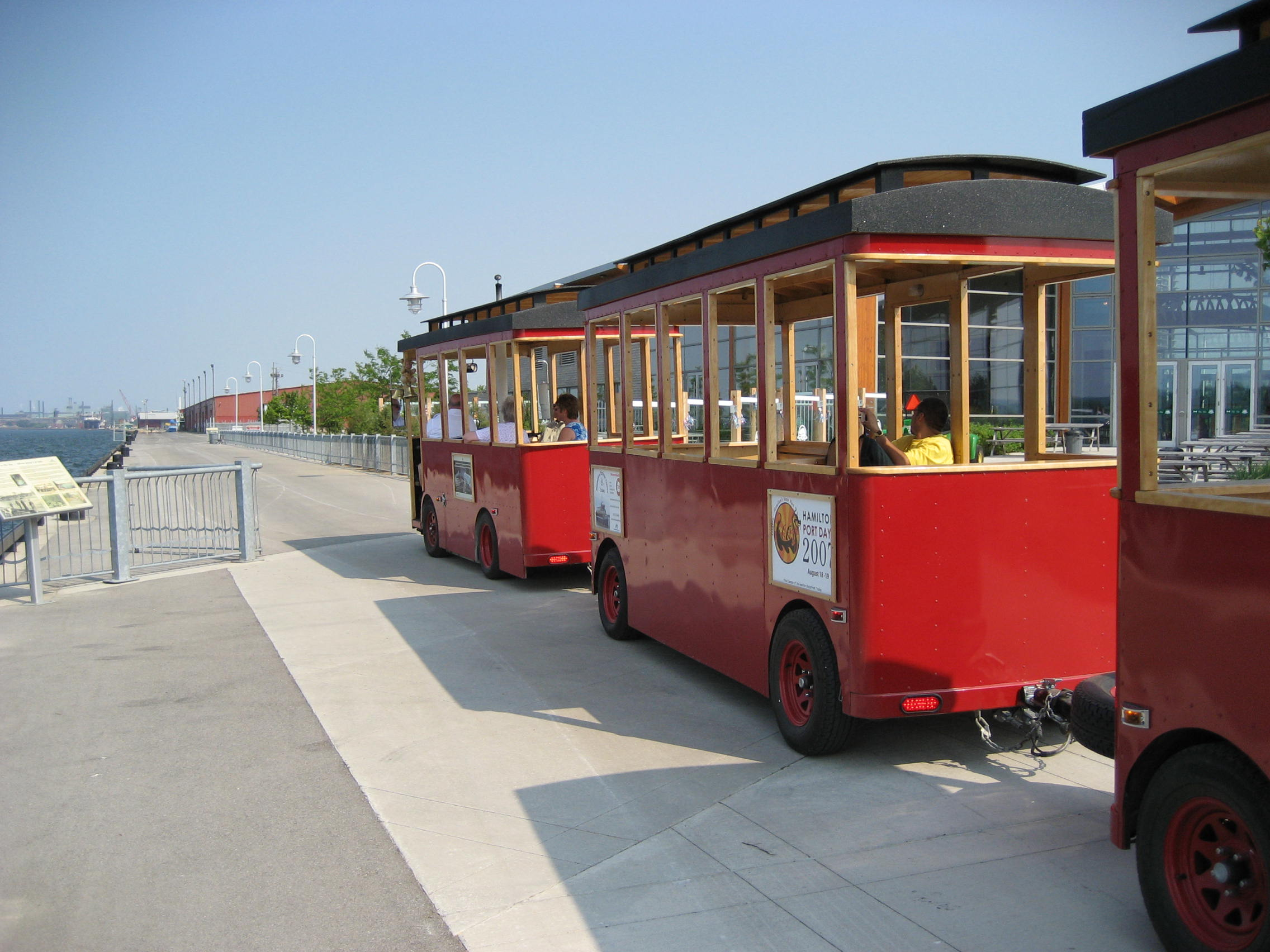
Waterfront Trolley

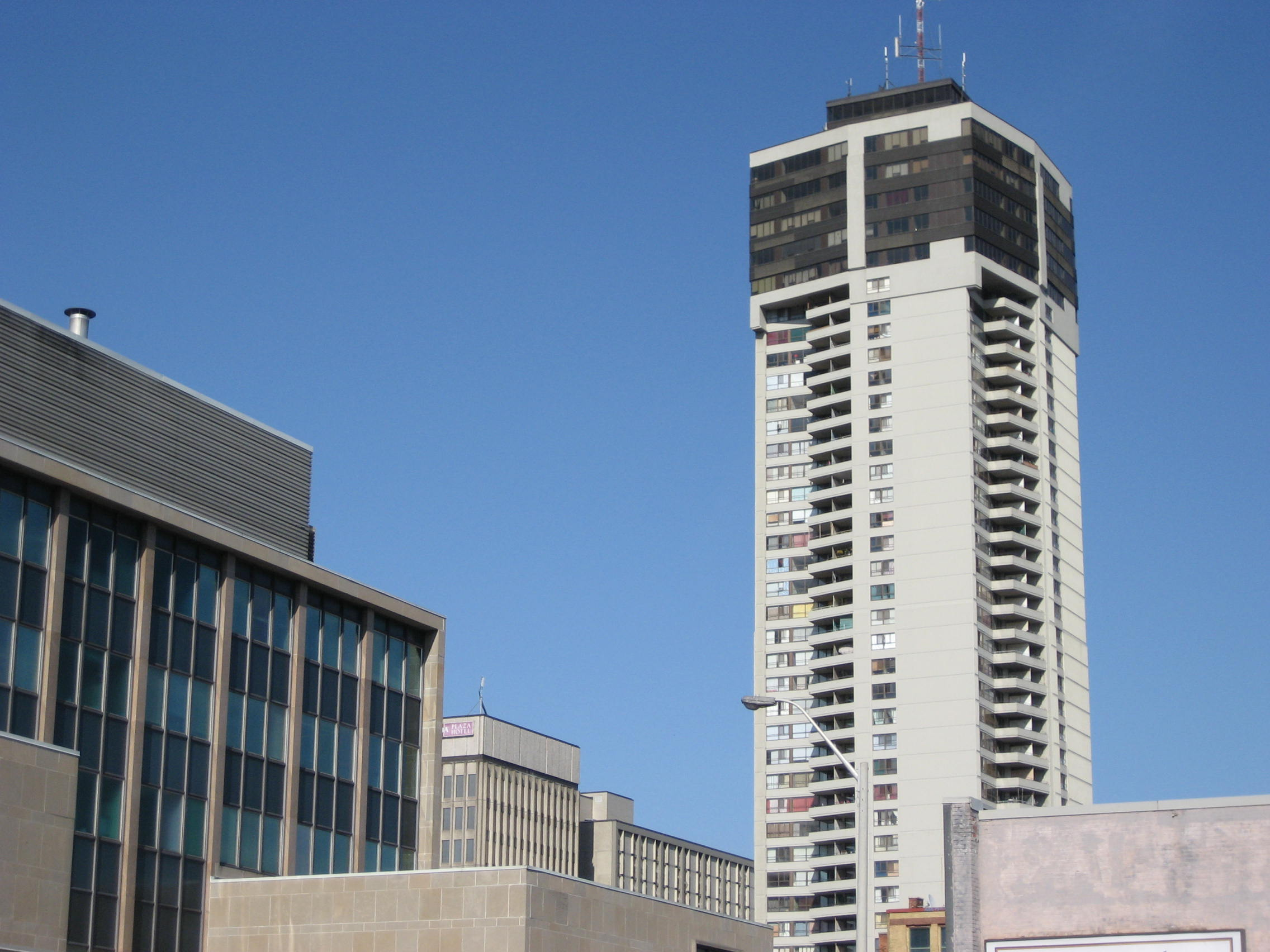
Landmark Place, Hamilton's tallest building, corner of Catharine and Main

Note: Listing of neighbourhoods from North to South

- North End - Everything north of the Canadian National Railway tracks
- Beasley
- Corktown
