= George Hamilton (city founder) =

Upper Canada merchant and politician

George Hamilton (c. October 1788 – February 20, 1836) was a Canadian merchant and politician who founded the city of Hamilton, Ontario.

== Life and career ==
Hamilton was born in October 1788 in Queenston Heights. He was the son of wealthy and influential Scottish-born Queenston merchant Robert Hamilton, who later held important government offices, being a member of the Legislative Council and lieutenant of the County of Lincoln, and of Catherine Askin Robertson.

Hamilton was educated in Edinburgh, Scotland and appears to have possessed a keen mind for business and letters.The Scottish schooling of the era would have exposed him to moral philosophy and what later became the separate discipline of economics. It is likely that his education fostered scepticism as well as a commitment to freedom of religion and the right to hold dissenting opinions, attitudes that would surface in his political career. He married Maria Lavinia Jarvis in 1811.

Hamilton served during the War of 1812, where he held the rank of captain with the Niagara Light Dragoons, participating in the capture of Detroit and the Battle of Queenston Heights and Lundy's Lane. During 1814, British troops billeted at his Queenston establishment burned the property. This loss, combined with a familiarity with the Head of the Lake acquired during the war when Burlington Heights was heavily garrisoned, may have prompted George Hamilton's purchase of 257 acres (1.04 km^{2}) of Barton Township from James Durand, in January 1815. Well placed and shrewd, Hamilton likely knew of prewar discussions about creating a new administrative district with a judicial centre. Within a year of his land purchase, Hamilton reached agreement with the owner of adjacent property to the north, Nathaniel Hughson, on a scheme which they calculated would increase the possibility of having the court-house and jail for the new district located on Hamilton lands, to the benefit of the values of both men's property. Together they empowered James Durand to lobby at the House of Assembly for the Hamilton townsite and to act as an agent selling town lots. The instructions coincided with the very week that the assembly and Legislative Council deliberated on the formation of the new district and the designation of a district town; the act was passed on 22 March 1816. The precise manoeuvres cannot be documented, but there is little doubt that the origins of the Hamilton town site, and its location back from the waterfront, derived from a complicated private affair involving Messrs. Hamilton, Hughson, and Durand. The new town was to become the capital of the new Gore District. Hamilton provided land for a courthouse and jail. The police village of Hamilton was incorporated in 1833.

The offer they made to the government of Upper Canada included the granting of two blocks of land of 2 acres (8,100 m^{2}) each to the Crown. These were to be reserved for the construction of public buildings. The overall design of the townsite, likely conceived in 1816, was commonplace. George Hamilton employed a grid street pattern used in most towns in Upper Canada and throughout the American frontier. The eighty original lots had frontages of fifty feet; each lot faced a broad street and backed onto a twelve-foot lane. It took at least a decade for all of the original lots to be sold, but the construction of the Burlington Canal in 1823, and a new court-house in 1827, encouraged Hamilton to add more blocks around 1828–29. At that time, he included a market square in an effort to draw commercial activity onto his lands, but the natural growth of the town was to the north of Hamilton's plot.

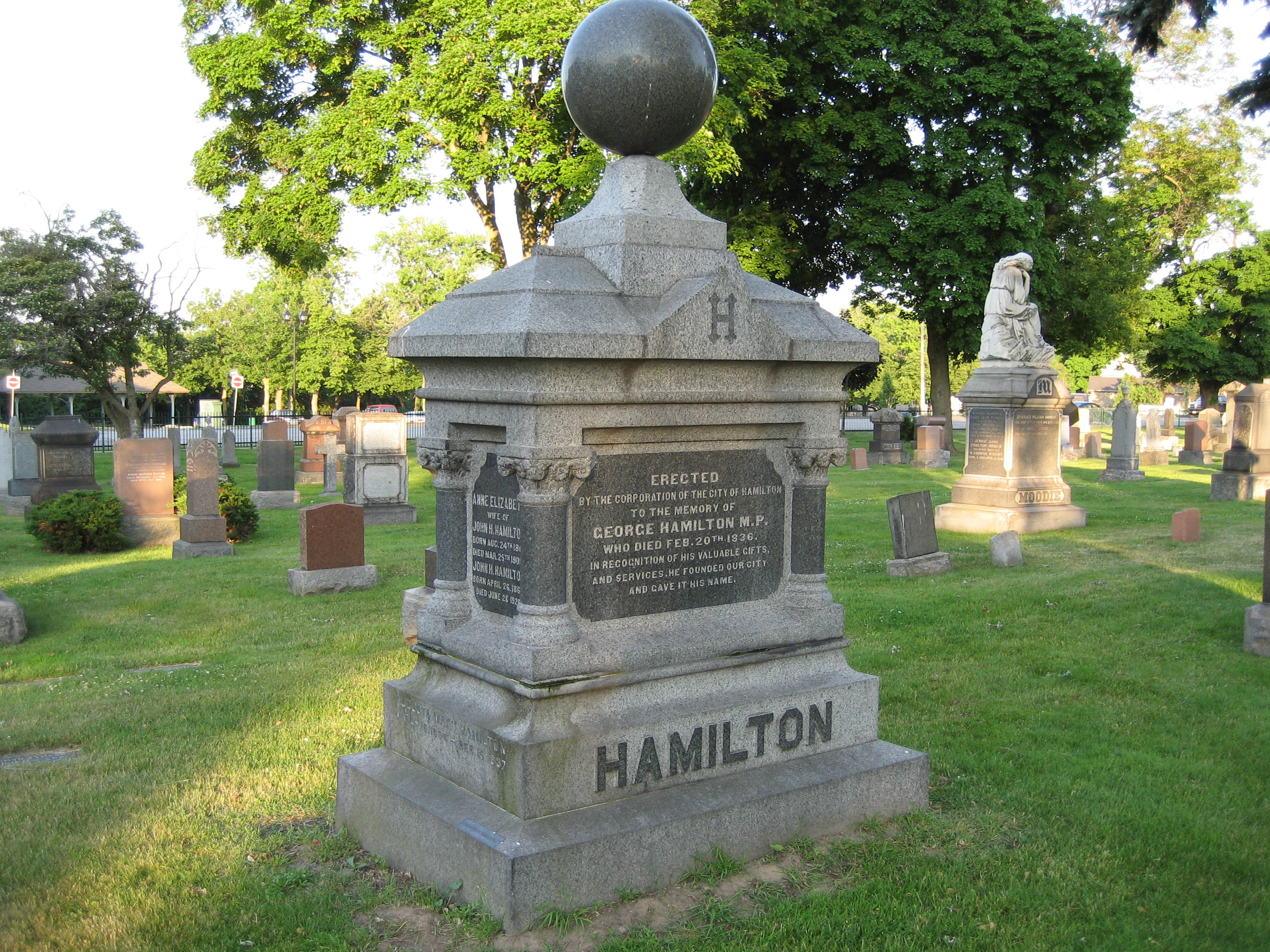

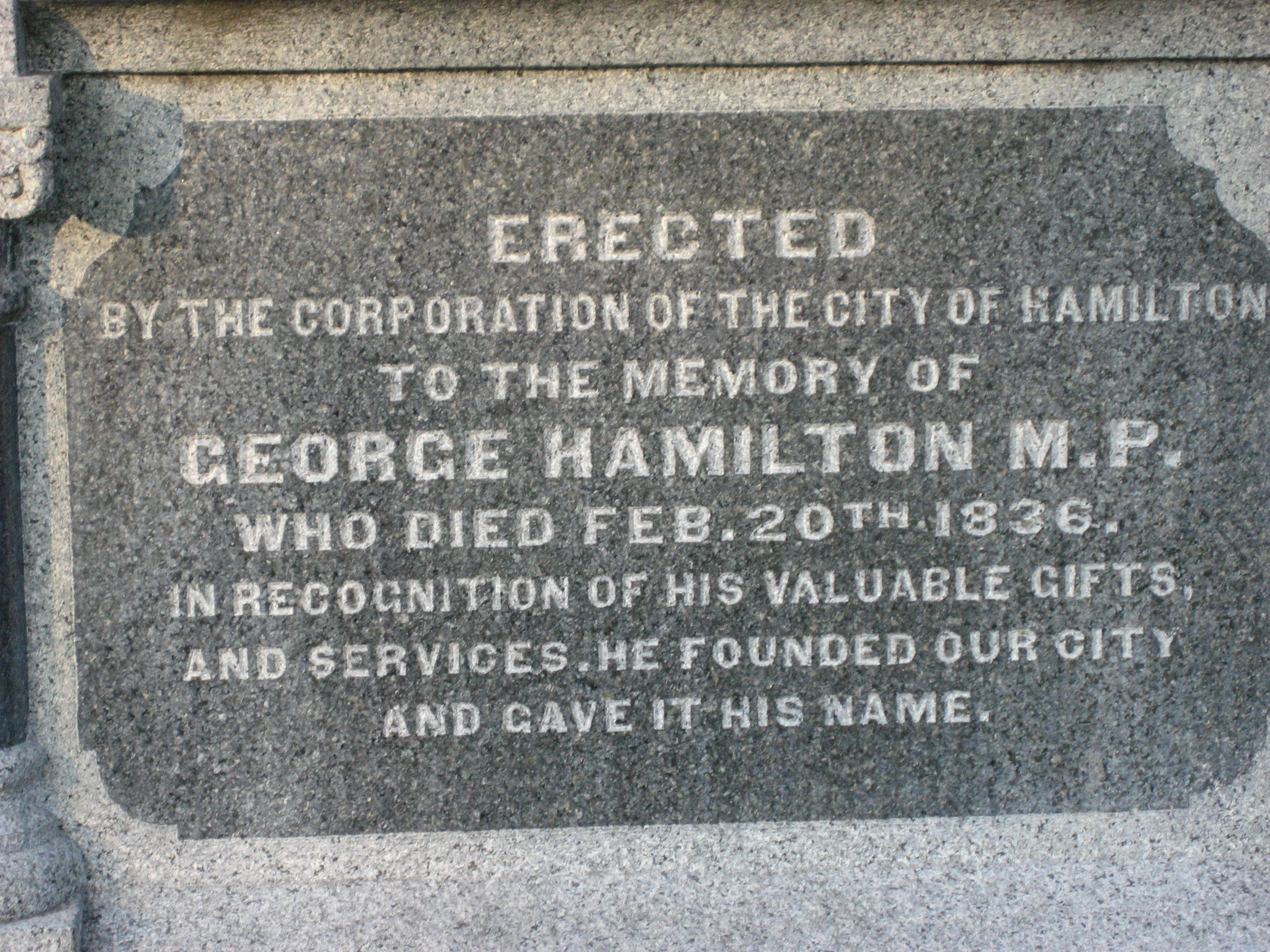

As a private town developer, Hamilton's record was mixed; he literally created the town, but he clearly tried to shape it to benefit his private fortunes. The market ploy, a successful petition for the crown to return one of the original 2-acre (8,100 m^{2}) squares, and eventual disputes over ownership of "the Gore" indicate his manipulative efforts. All the same, he left enduring marks on the urban landscape; the court-house square, the haymarket, "the Gore", and the basic street plan of the city core.

Hamilton represented the riding of Wentworth in the Legislative Assembly of Upper Canada from 1821 to 1830, where he tended to support moderate reformers and encourage immigration to Canada. He helped set up a canal to link Hamilton harbour to Lake Ontario and worked to secure funding for the court house and jail.

Hamilton died on February 20, 1836, and was buried at the family burial plot on the family's farm. His remains, along with the remains of other members of his family that were buried there, were later removed to the Hamilton lot in Hamilton Cemetery in Section Z (Lots 431 etc.).

Hamilton was one of a handful of important Canadians who recognized the colony's special needs and possibilities at an early date.
