= Hess Village =

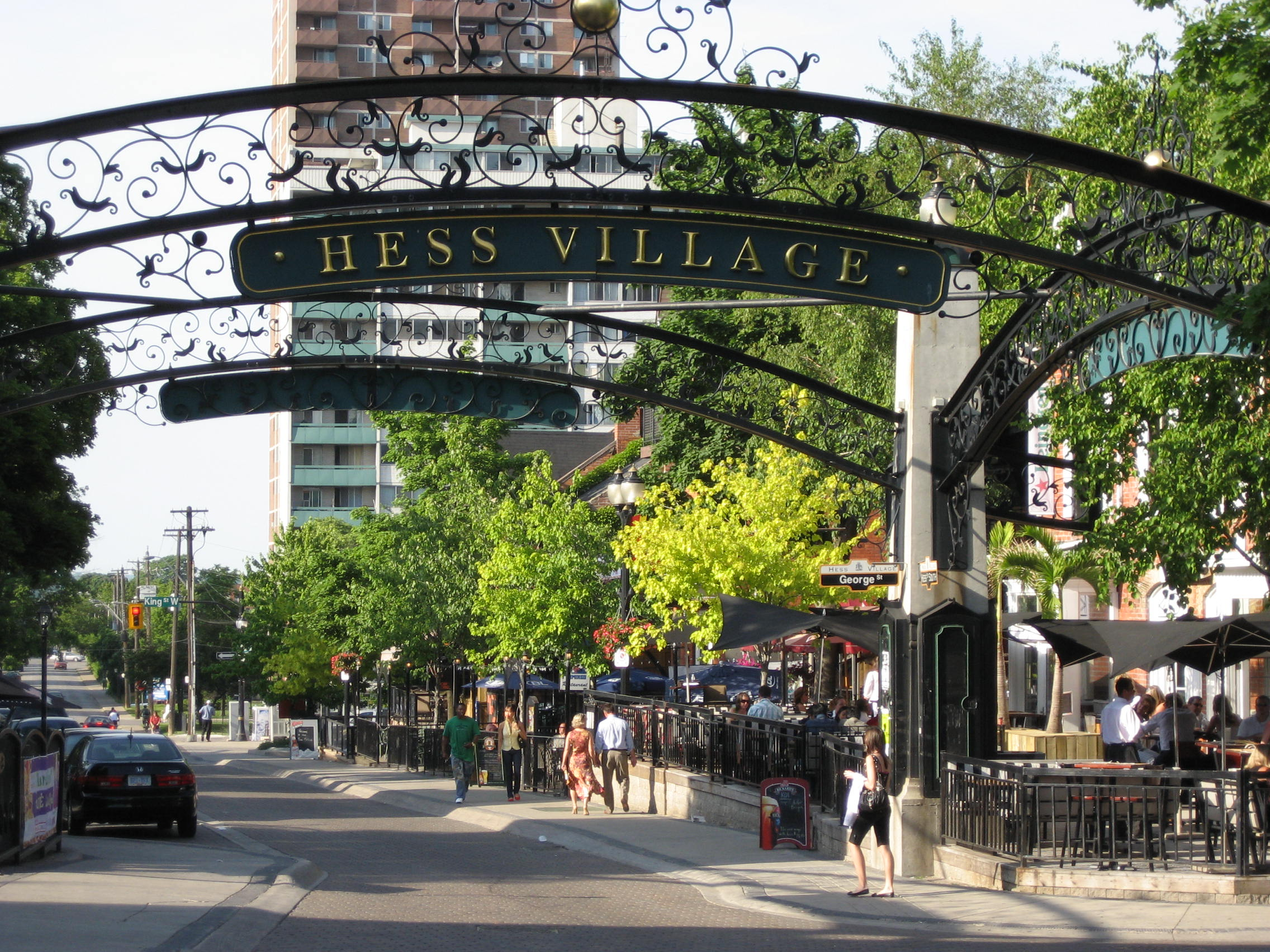
Hess Village, entrance

Hess Village is a pedestrianized area in the downtown of Hamilton, Ontario, Canada, which is named after the street its located on, Hess Street, a north-south Lower City collector street that travels through the centre of the area, and is between Main Street and King Street. Its area, in contrast to other areas in Hamilton, are quite thin and restrict vehicle access, which makes it the perfect area for Hamiltons nightlife, as it's the location for Hamiltons most notable nightclubs, bars, and historic buildings.

== History ==
Hess Street is named after Peter Hess, a farmer and landowner. Peter Street in Hamilton is also named after him, as well, Caroline Street was named after one of his daughters.

== Landmarks ==
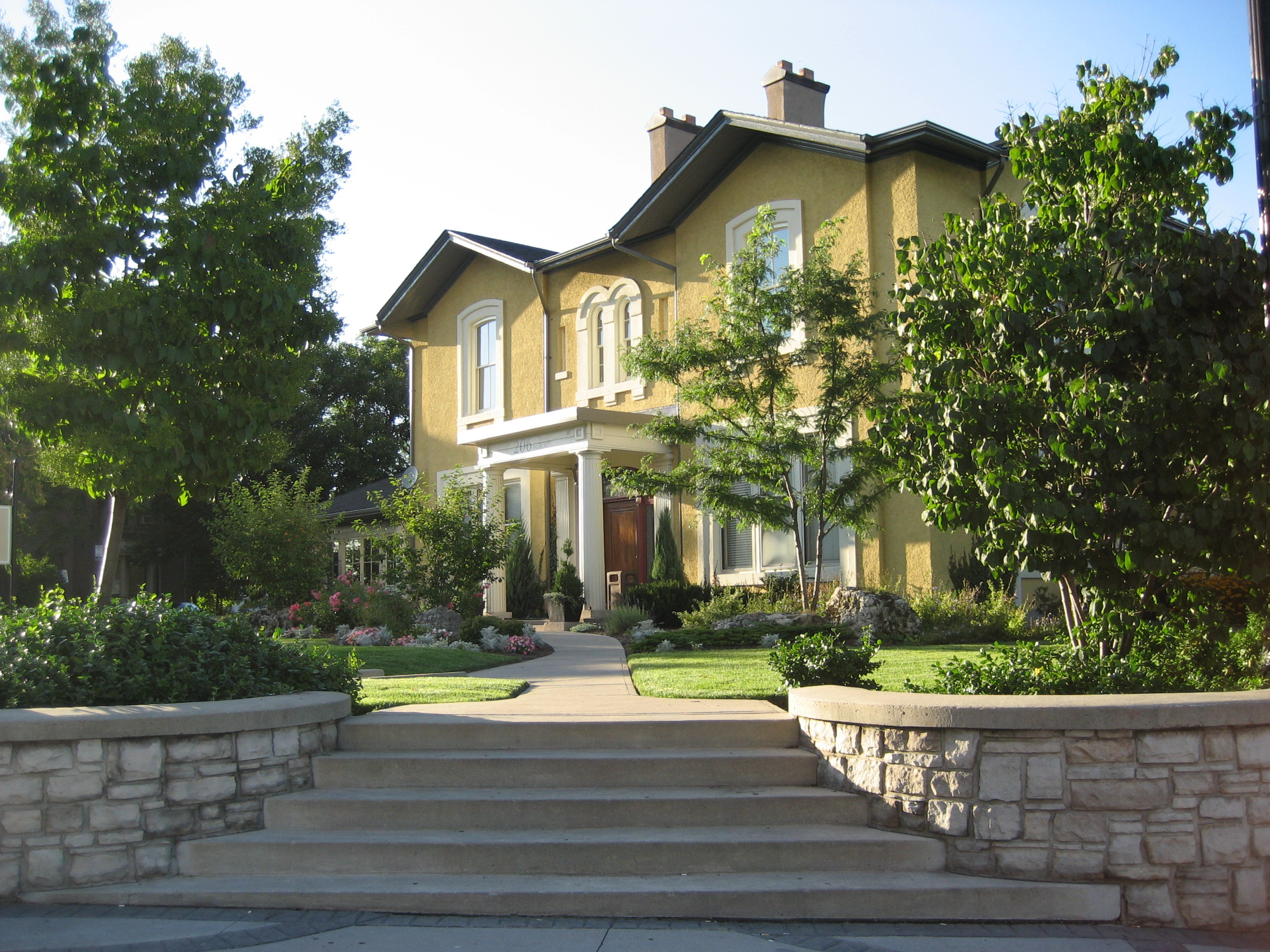
Dental office, Hess Village

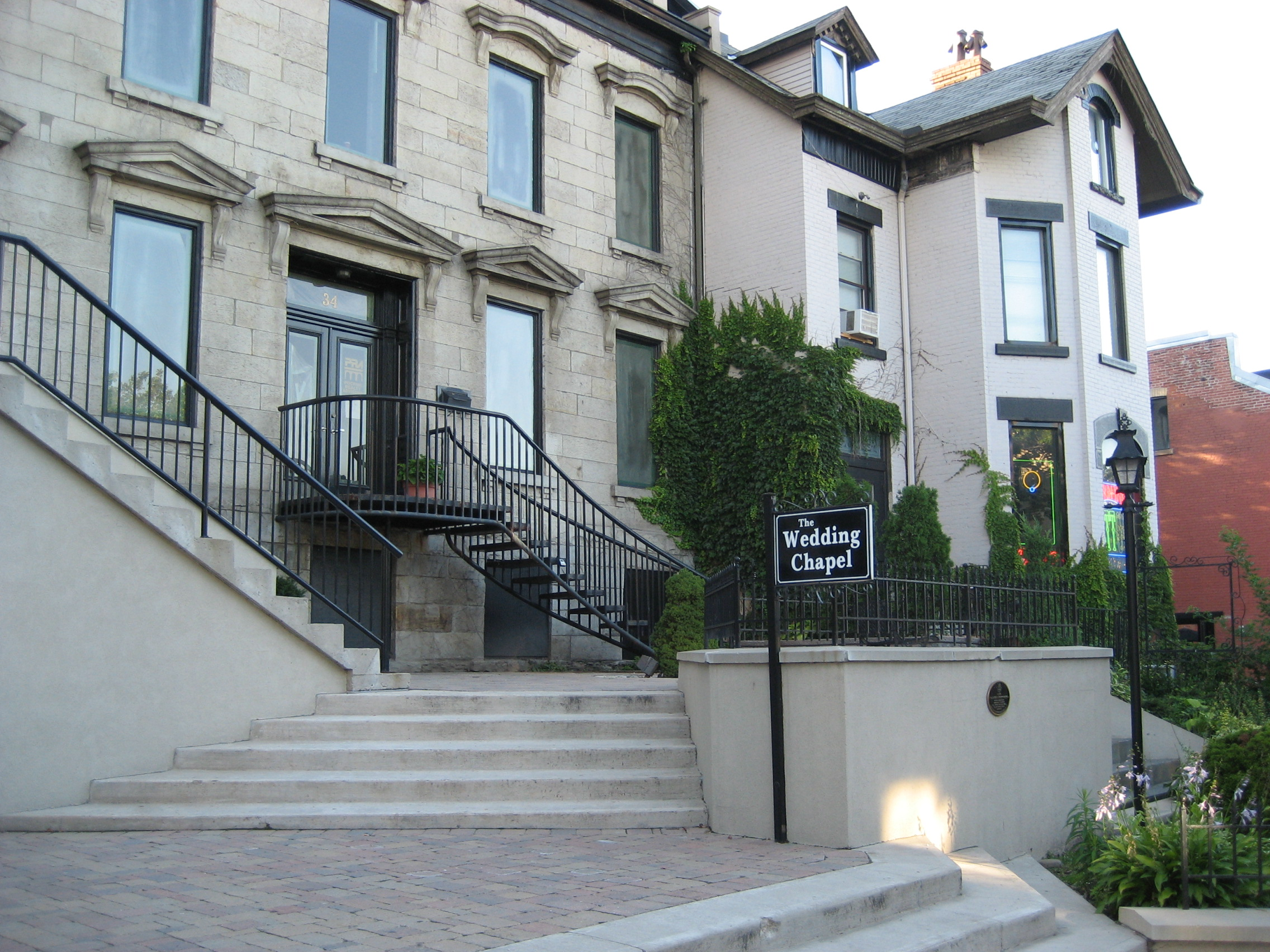
Wedding chapel (closed), Hess Village

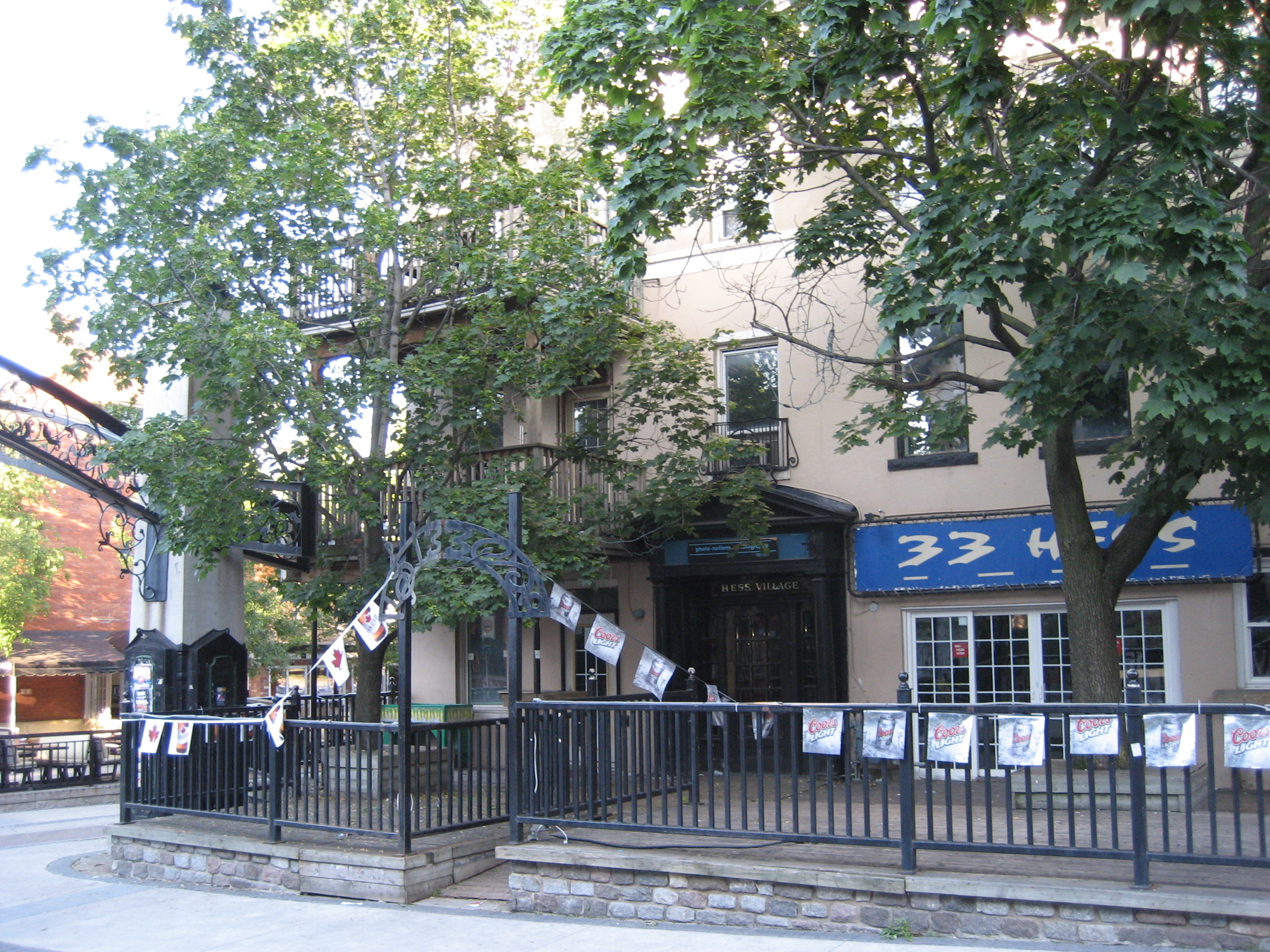
33 Hess, music venue, (closed) Hess Village

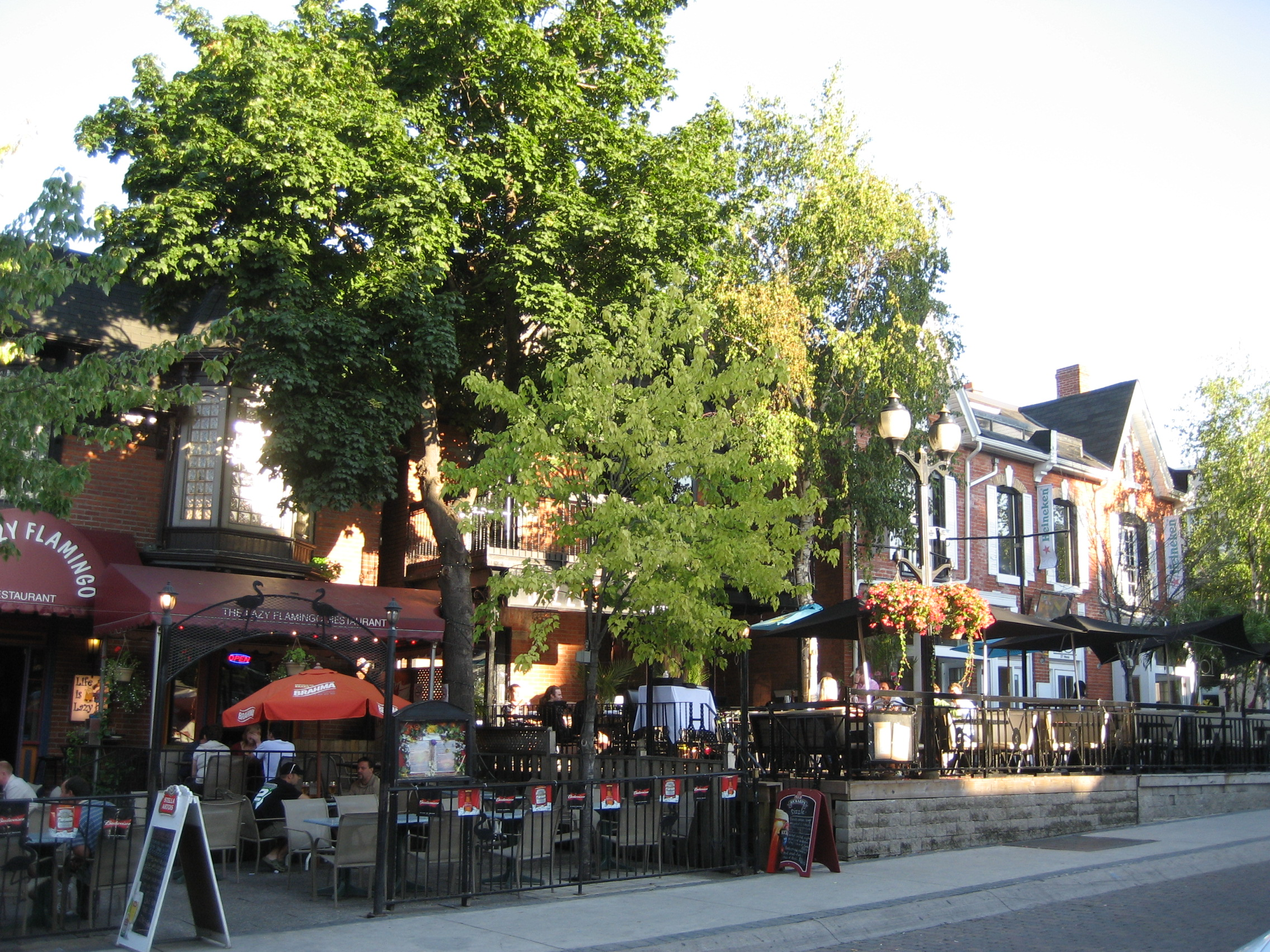
Hess Village

Note: Listing of Landmarks from North to South.

- Canadian National Railway Yard
- Hess Street Elementary School
- Sir John A. Macdonald Secondary School
- Ohav Zedeck Synagogue (Hess Street Synagogue)
- Hess Village
- 55 Hess (Apartments)
- Bruce Trail
- Niagara Escarpment (mountain)

== Communities ==
Note: Listing of neighbourhoods from North to South

- Central - The financial center of Hamilton, Ontario
- Durand

== See also ==
- Niagara Escarpment Commission
