= Peter Hess (landowner) =

Peter Hess (September 10, 1779 – August 9, 1855) was a farmer and landowner. He was born 1779 in Upper Mount Bethel Township, Pennsylvania to Loyalist Michael Hess and Gertraudt Van Cortlandt, a descendant of Stephanus Van Cortlandt, the Bayard family, and the Schuyler family from New York. He emigrated to Canada in 1789.

Peter Street and Hess Street, in the city of Hamilton, Ontario, are named after him. Caroline Street is named after one of his six daughters, through his wife, Sarah Beasley.

In the 19th century, he acquired land in Hamilton, west of present-day Bay Street to Queen Street, stretching from Aberdeen Street almost to the Bay.

He died in 1855 in Barton Township, Canada (present day Hamilton, Ontario) and is buried in Hamilton Cemetery.
