= Hughson Street =

Road in Hamilton, Ontario, Canada

Coordinates: 43.26984°N 79.86186°W

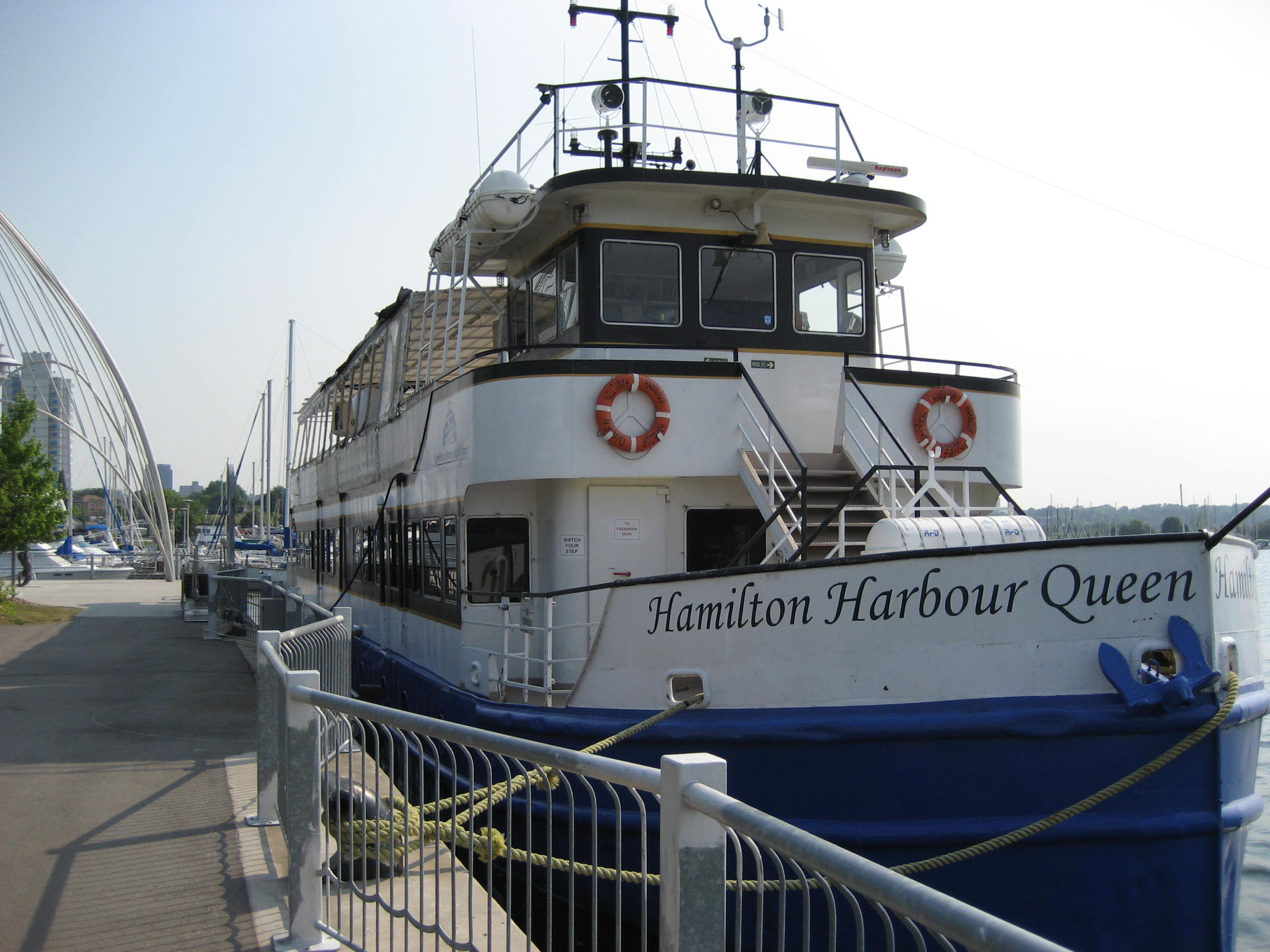
Hamilton Harbour Queen, Pier 8

Hughson Street is a Lower City collector road in Hamilton, Ontario, Canada. It starts at Charlton Avenue East at St. Joseph's hospital and runs north to Haymarket Street in the downtown where it's cut off by the Hamilton GO Transit station. Up to this point it is a two-way street. It then starts up again north of the station on Hunter Street East, where it then becomes a one-way street going north just past Barton Street East to Murray Street where it's cut off again by a parking lot for LIUNA Station. It then starts up again one block north past the CN railway tracks on Strachan Street and from this point onwards becomes a two-way street again that extends to the city's North End to the waterfront on Guise Street West, the site of the Canada Marine Discovery Centre and Pier 9.

== History ==
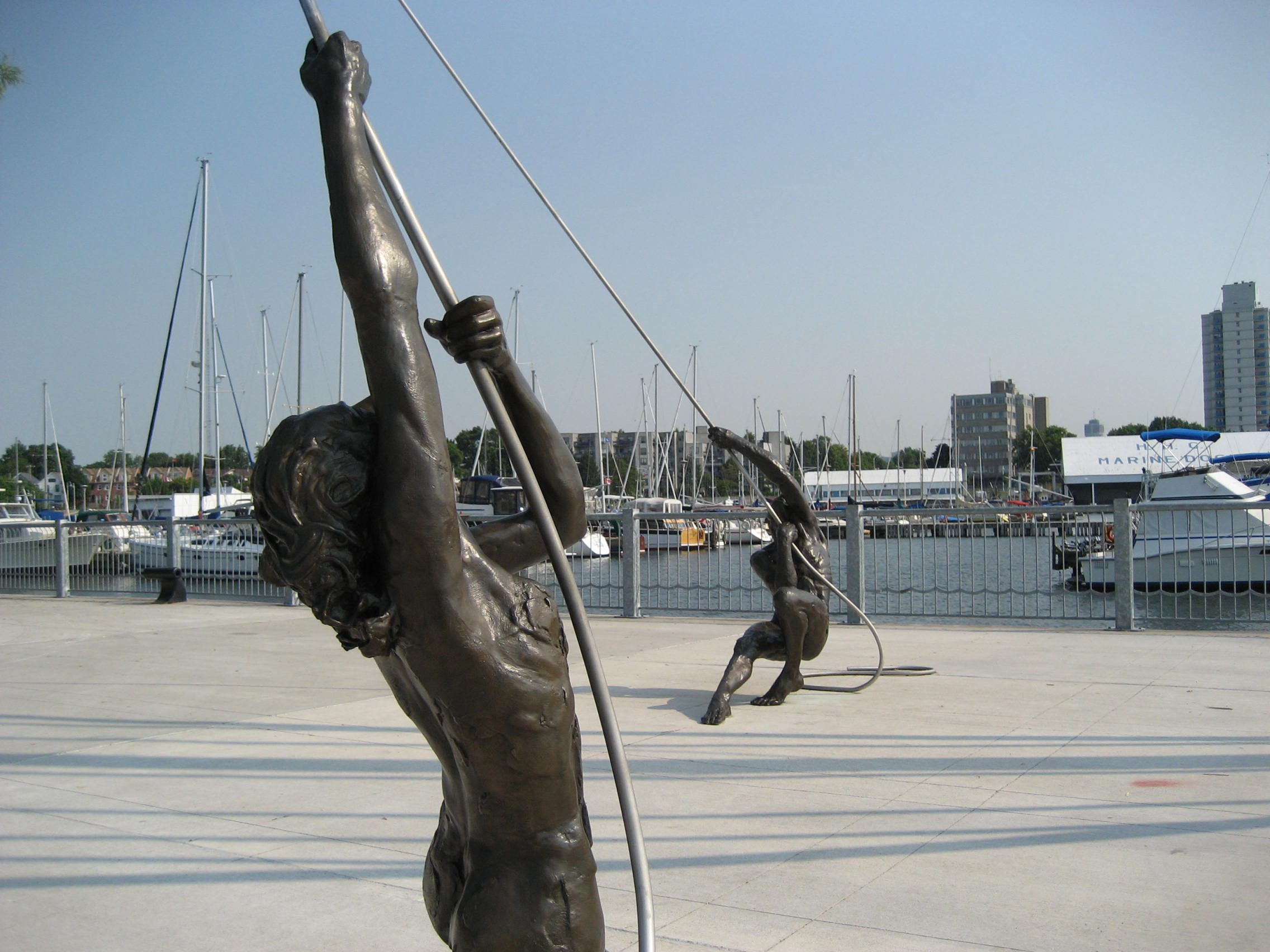
Pier 8, Hamilton Waterfront Trail, Art Sculpture

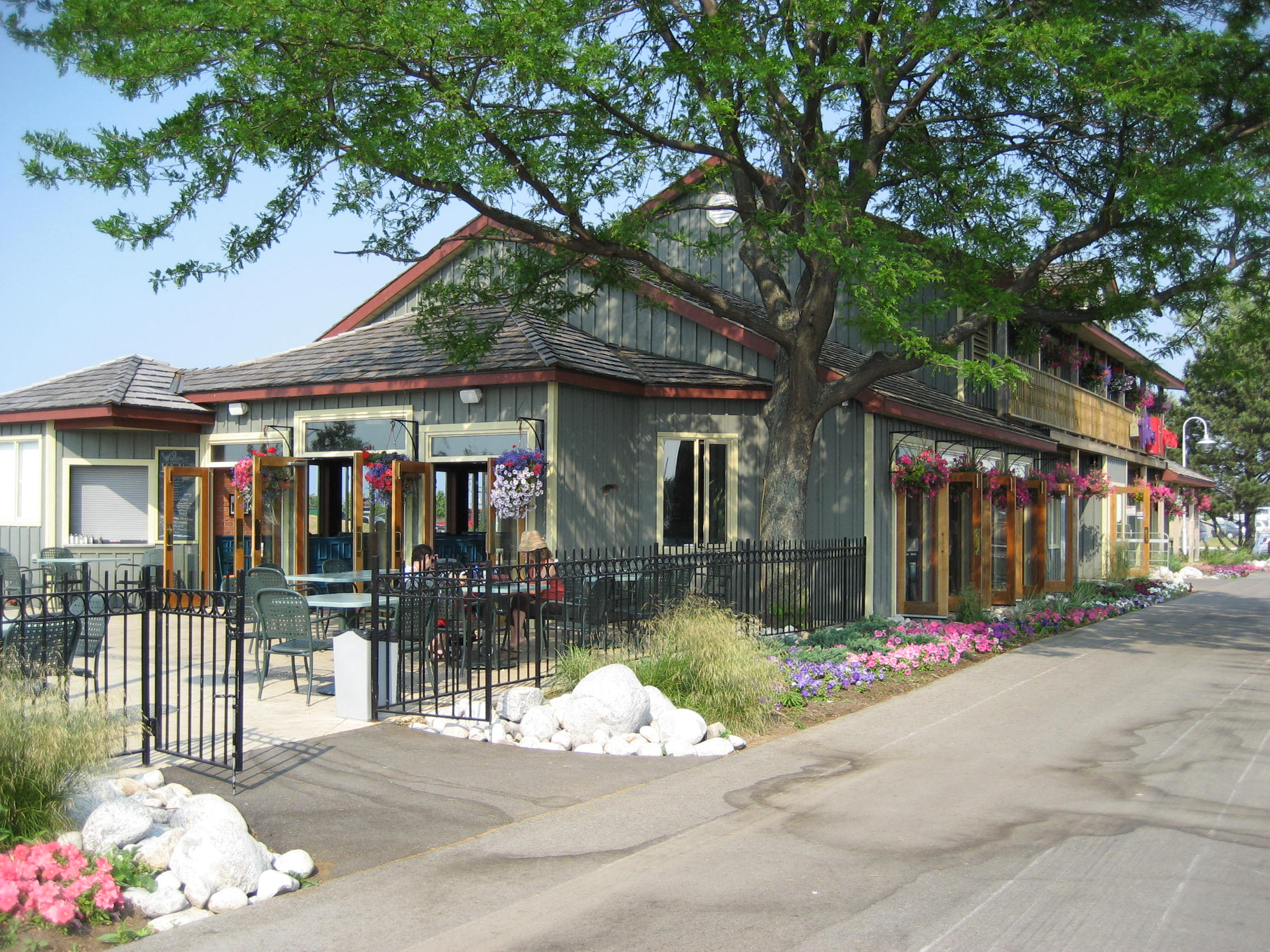
Pier 8, Hamilton Waterfront Trail, Restaurant

Hughson Street was named after Nathaniel Hughson (1755–1837), a farmer and hotel owner. Hughson was a Loyalist who moved to Canada following the American Revolution, one of the city founders. Other streets in the city were named after his family members: James Street (son), Rebecca Street (wife) and Catharine Street (daughter).

The Sir John A. Macdonald Statue at Gore Park arrived in Hamilton from London, England on 30 October 1893. Official dedication of the statue took place 1 November 1893. Originally, the statue was located at the intersection of King and Hughson Streets and pointed West. Prime Minister Sir John Thompson was in attendance. Alexander Aitchison, a local Hamilton Fire Chief, died of injuries he sustained from crashing into the base of the statue with his horse and buggy and because of it, the statue was then relocated to Gore Park near King and John Streets only this time the statue instead of pointing West, now points East.

Canadian Canners Ltd. (1903–1986) used to be on 44 Hughson Street South across the street from the County Courthouse. Today it is the site of a parking lot.

In 1996, The refurbished TH&B Station became the GO Station, as well as the city's bus terminal.

== Waterfront Trolley ==
The Hamilton Waterfront Trolley is a narrated tour along the 12 kilometre Hamilton Waterfront Trail. The main stop and departure spot is at the Hamilton Waterfront SCOOPS Ice Cream parlour, which provides the famous Stoney Creek Dairy Ice Cream. There are a dozen stops along the way between Princess Point at the western-end of the route to the eastern-end, the site of HMCS Haida. Also near this eastern-end route is the site of the Hamiltonian Tour Boat, which is a 12-passenger tour boat that offers a leisurely guided tour of Hamilton harbour with the captain providing interesting stories and history of one of North America's most noteworthy harbours. In addition to this there is also the Hamilton Harbour Queen Cruises which is another ship that offers 3-hour tour of the harbour along with Lunch, Dinner or other special events like Dance parties. This Harbour Queen Cruise was also the 2005 winner of the Hamilton Tourism Awards for "best tourism idea." It has a passenger capacity of 200.

== Landmarks ==
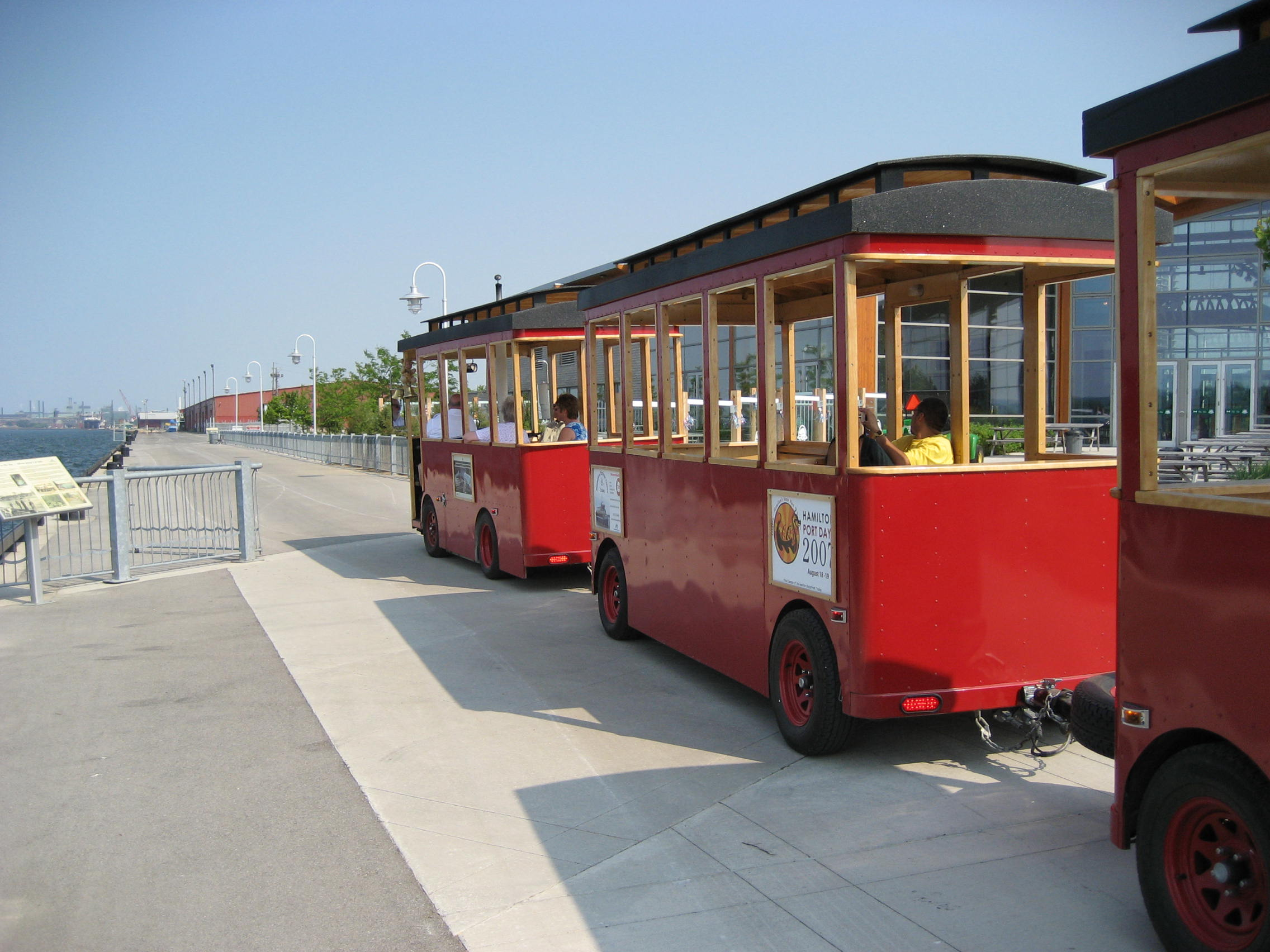
Waterfront Trolley, Pier 8

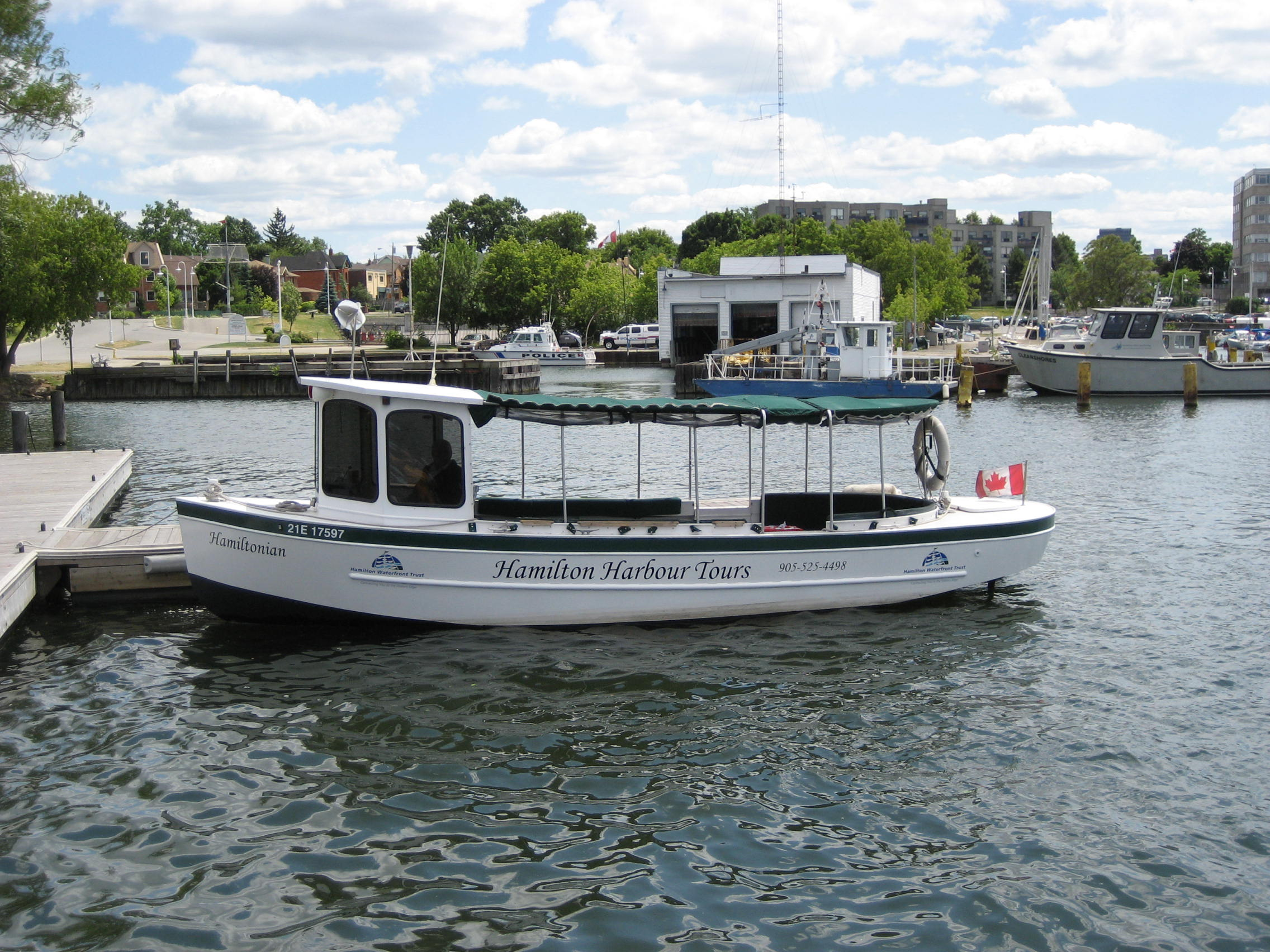
Hamiltonian, tour boat, Pier 8

Note: Listing of Landmarks from North to South.

- Pier 8, Pier 9
- Hamilton Harbour Queen (seasonal cruise ship)
- Canada Parks Discovery Centre
- Hamilton/ Halton Police Marine Unit
- Waterfront trail
- Canadian National railway tracks (Hughson Street interrupted here, resumes again north of tracks on Strachan Street)
- LIUNA Station
- Downtown Arts Centre
- James North/Hughson Street Baptist Church (http://www.hughson.ca)
- St. John's Evangelical Lutheran Church (http://www.stjohnshamilton.ca)
- Downtown Bingo Hall
- Gore Park Waterfountain
- Gore Park
- Hamilton GO Transit station, Original site of the Toronto, Hamilton and Buffalo Railway (1892–1987)
- St. Joseph's Hospital

== Communities ==
Note: Listing of neighbourhoods from North to South

- North End - Everything north of the Canadian National Railway tracks
- Beasley
- Corktown

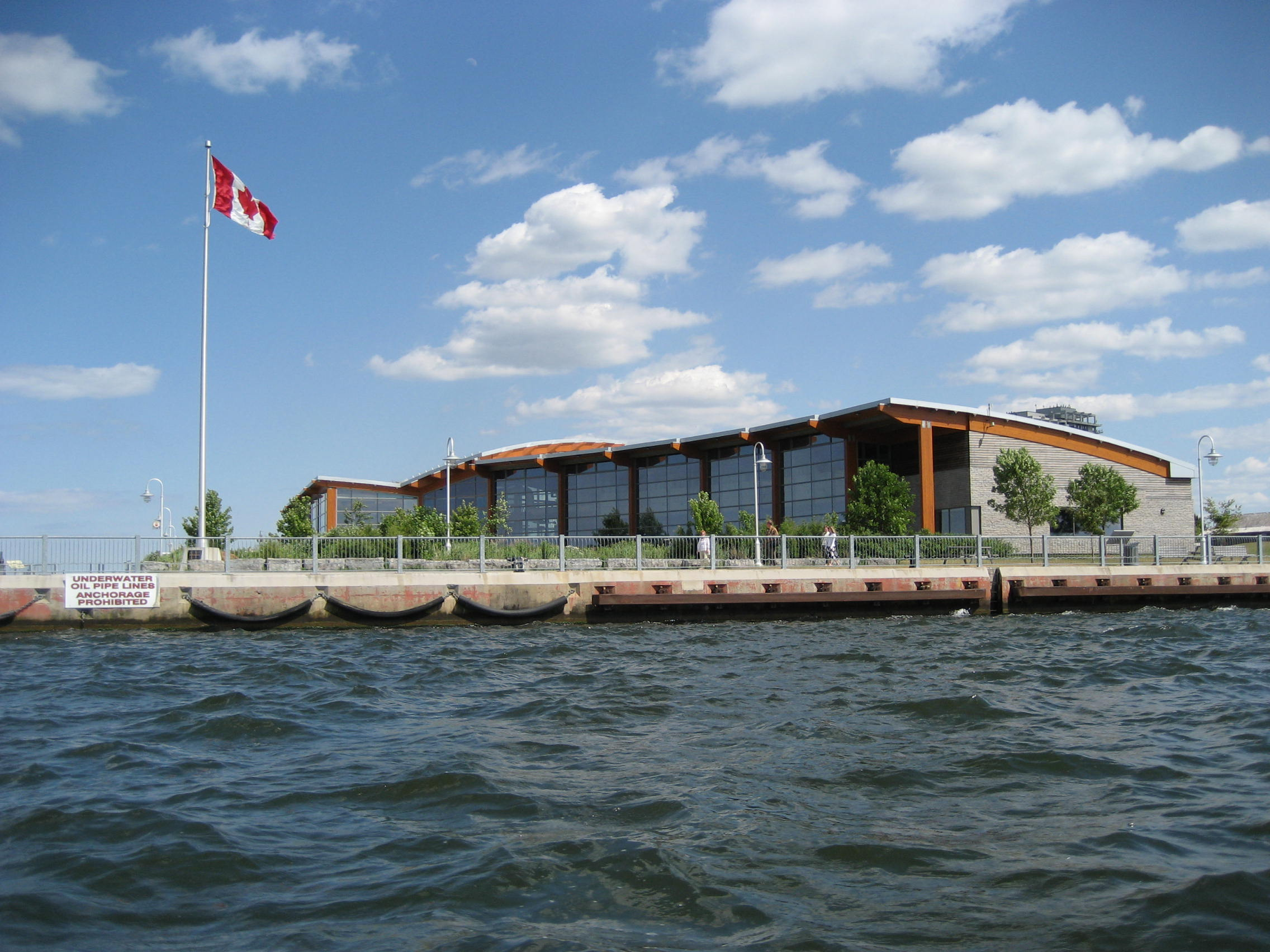
Canada Parks Discovery Centre

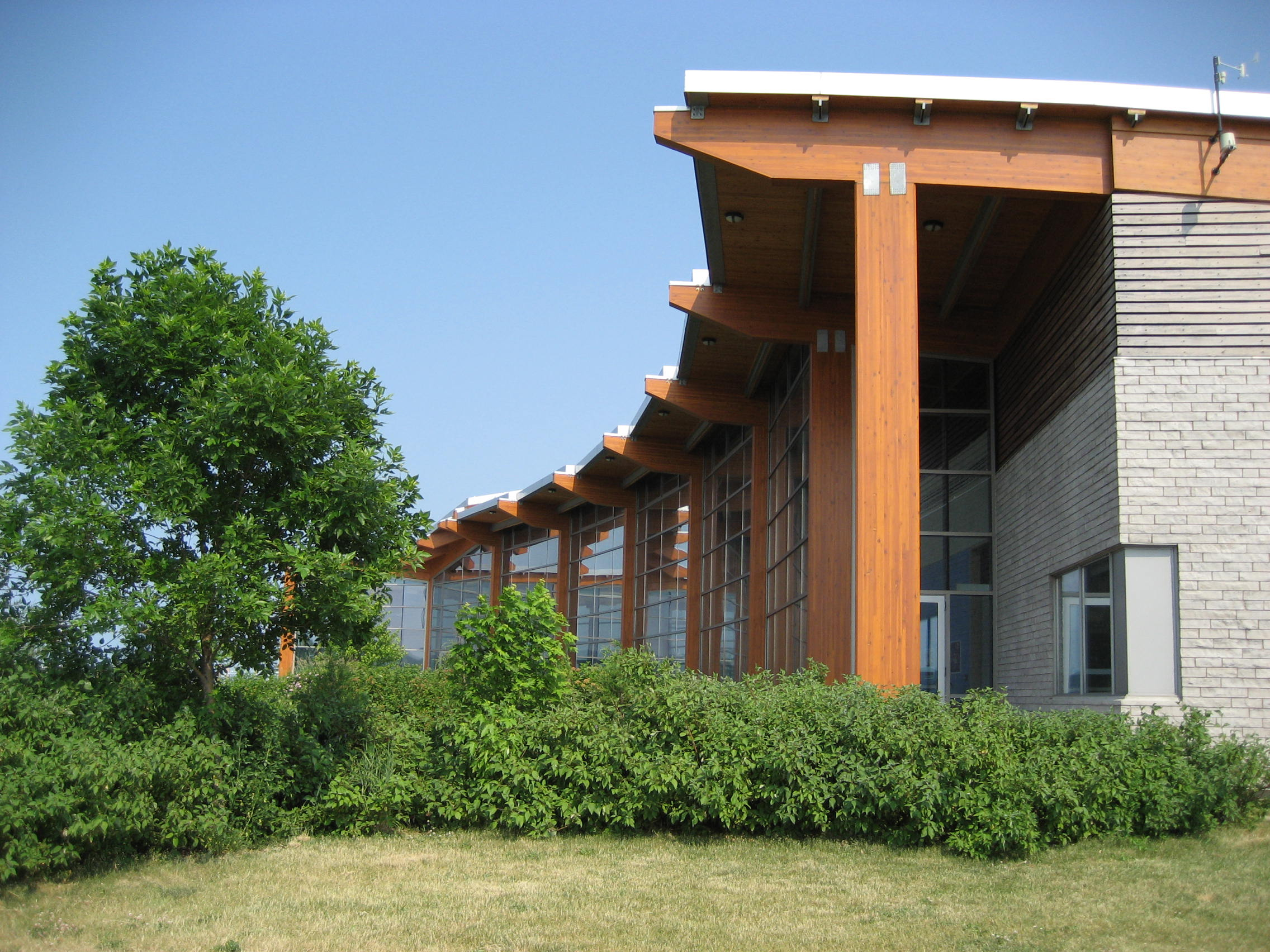
Canada Parks Discovery Centre

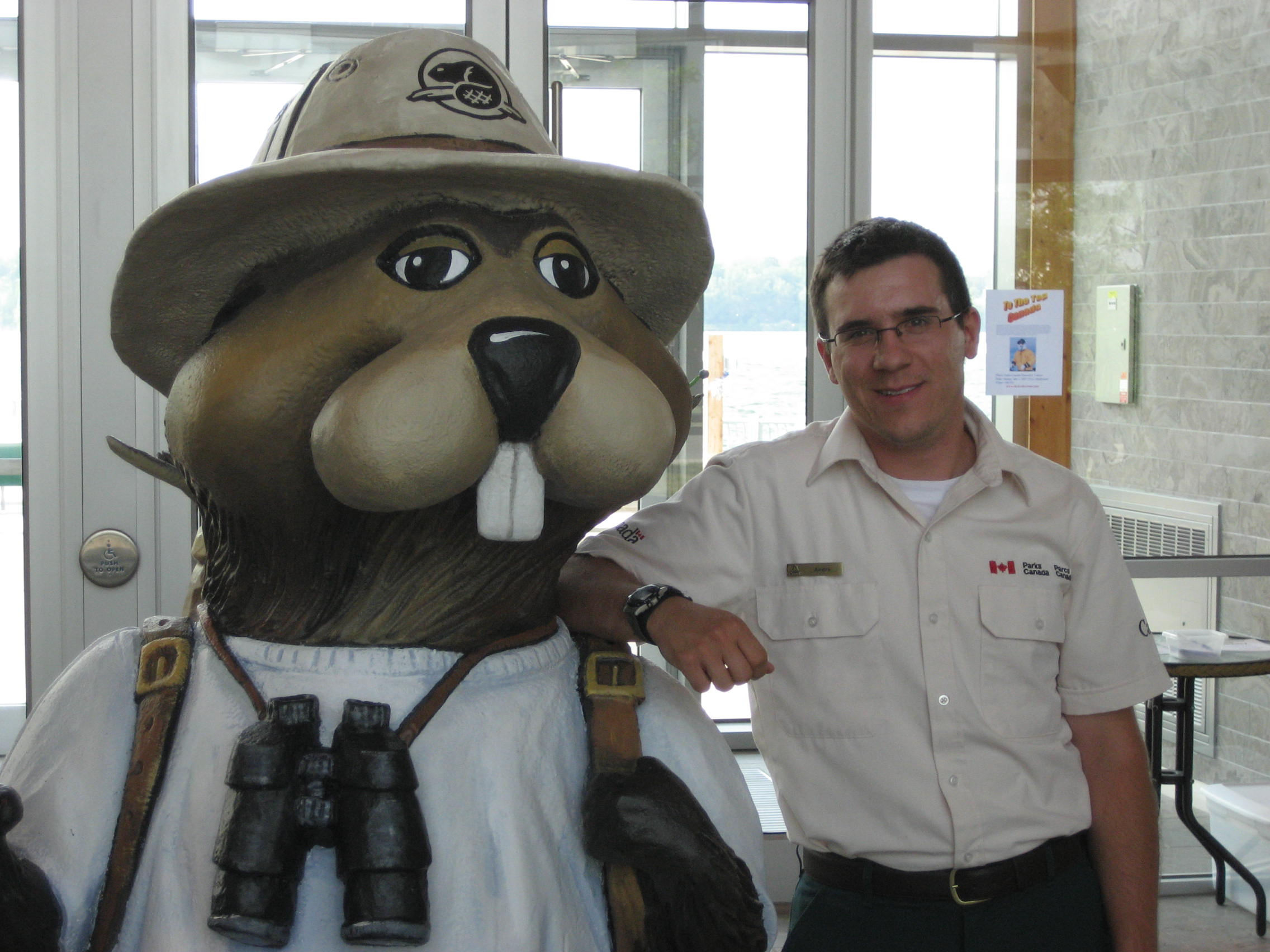
Mascot w/ Security, Canada Parks Discovery Centre

== Images ==
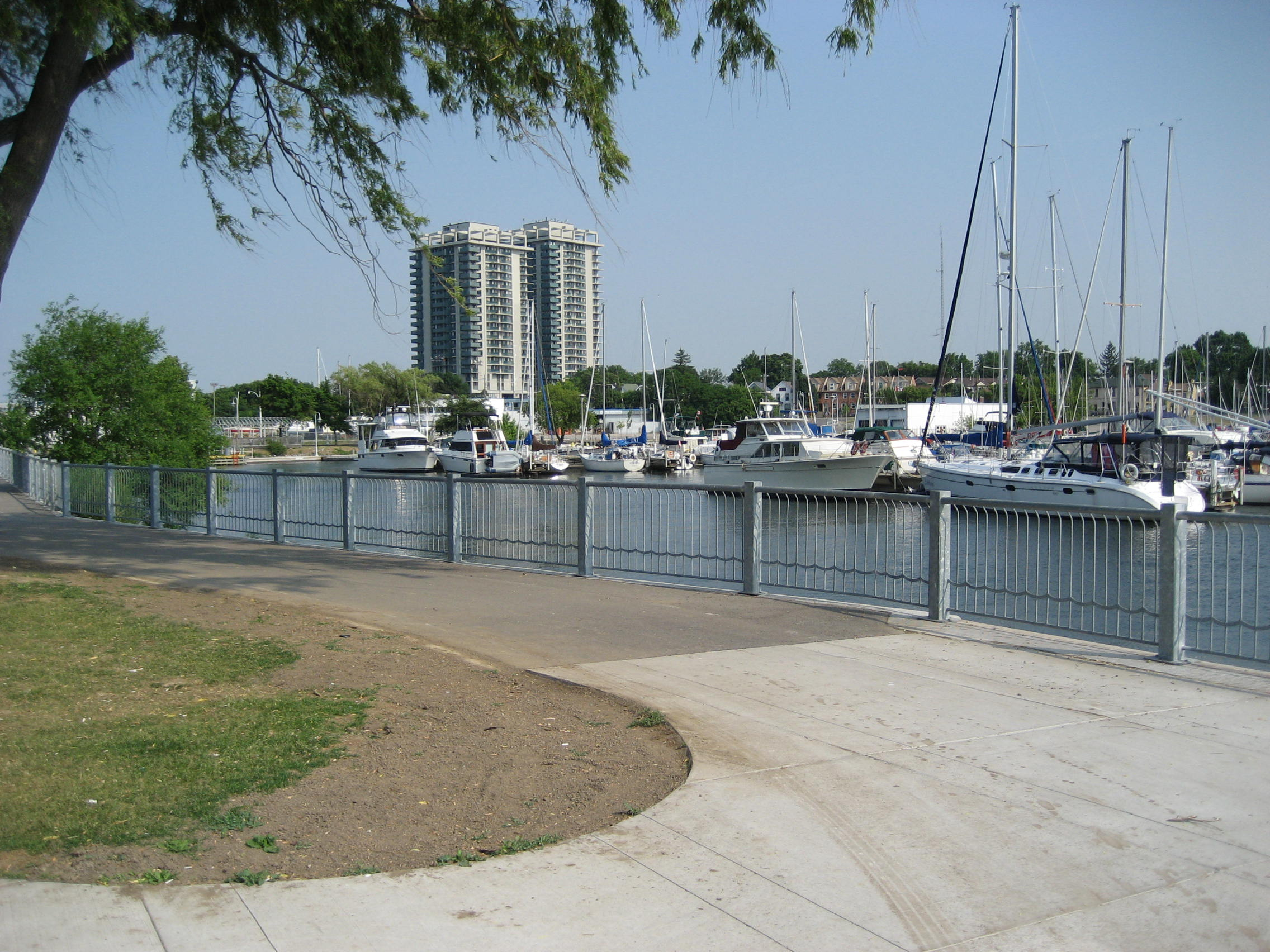
Waterfront Trail, Pier 8

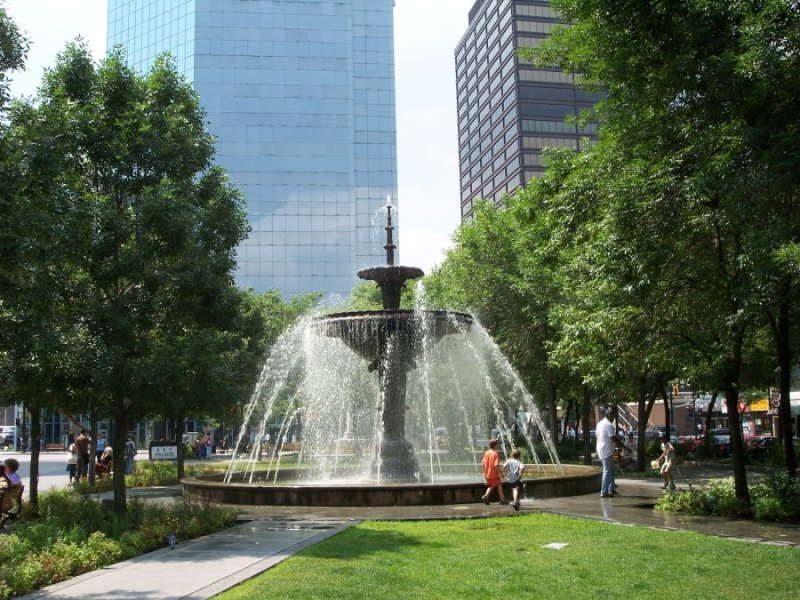
Gore Park Waterfountain, King & Hughson Streets

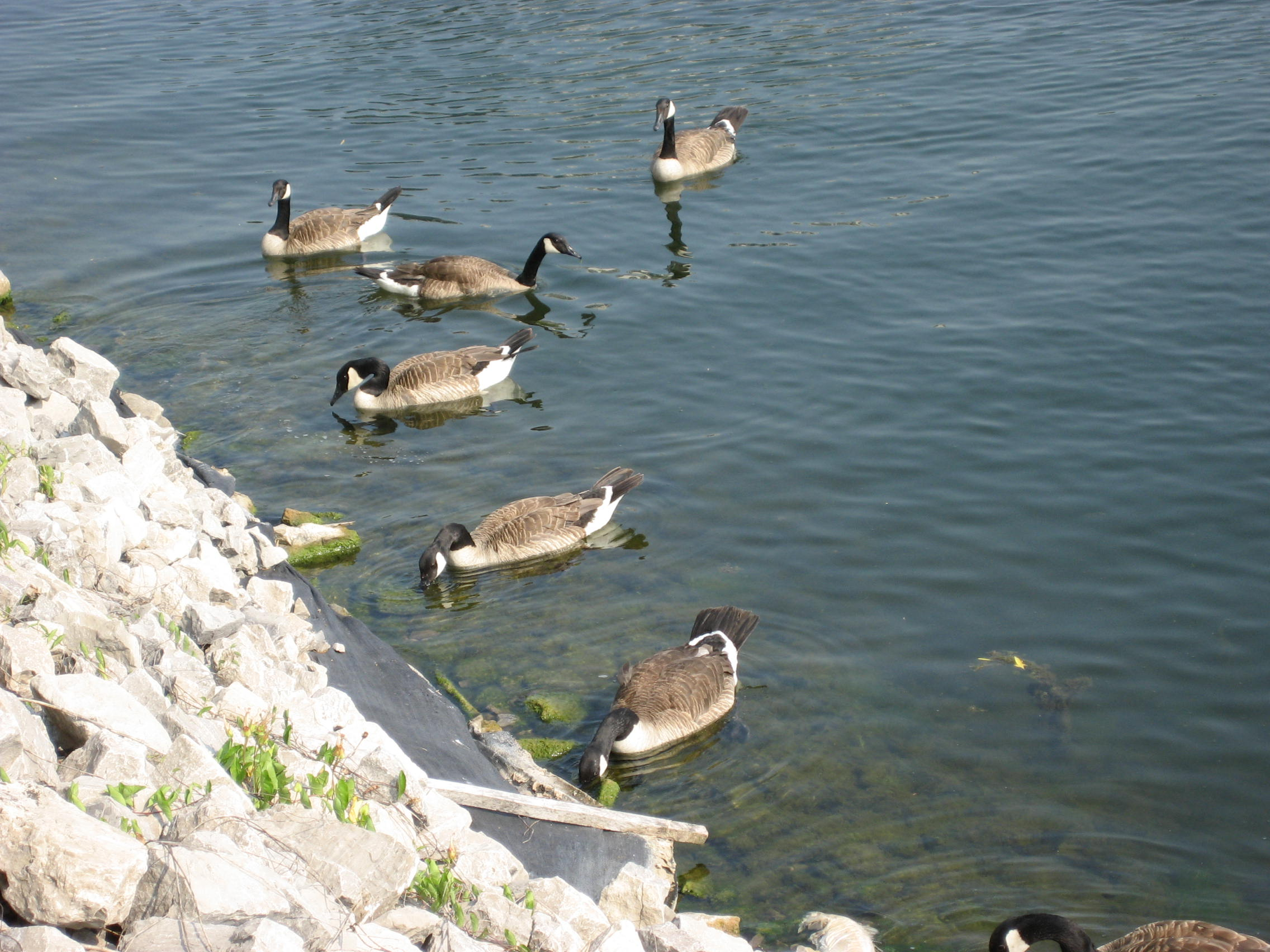
Canada Geese, Pier 8

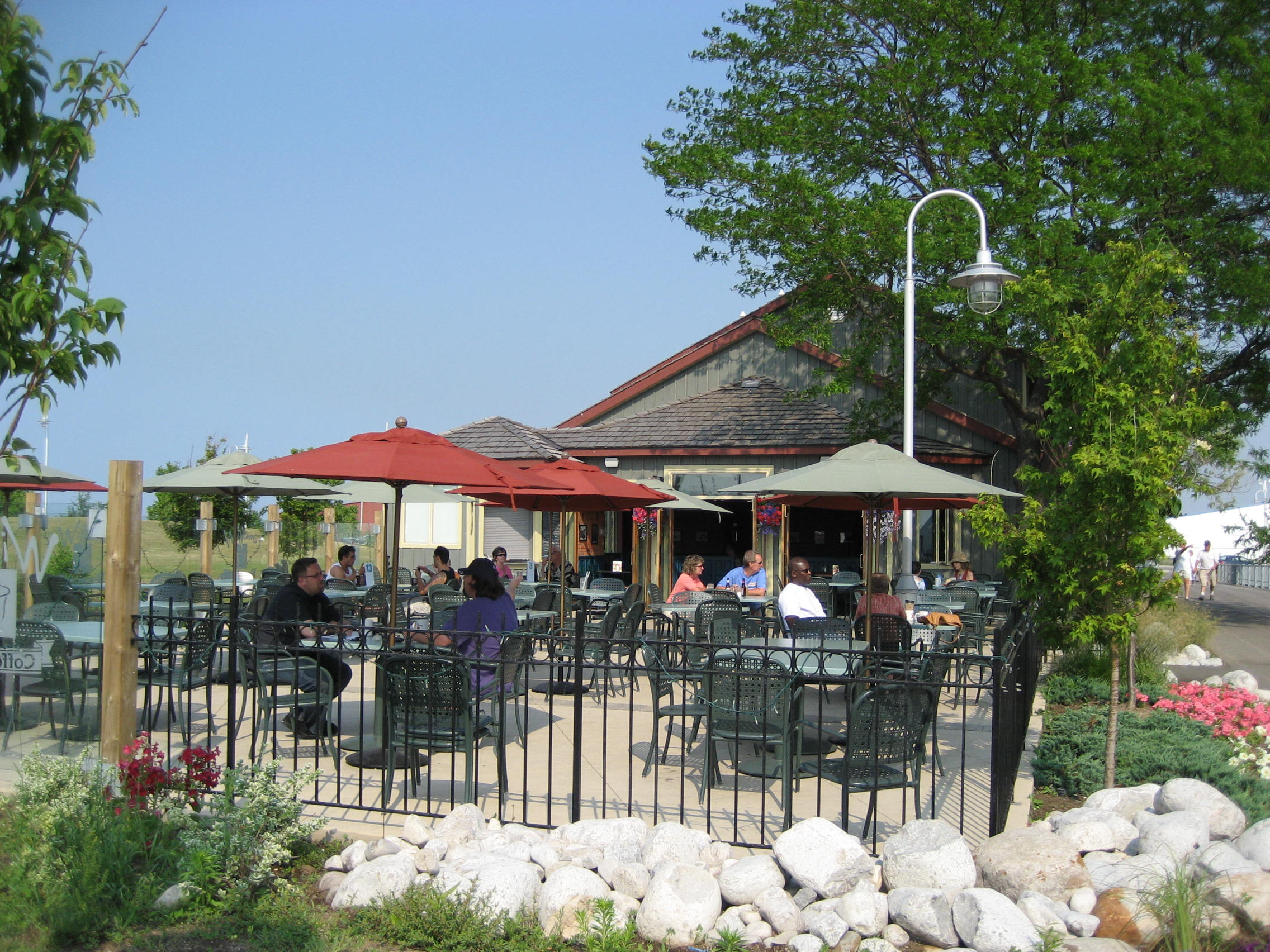
Waterfront Restaurant
