= Nathaniel Hughson =

Nathaniel Hughson (16 July 1755 in New York – 1 November 1837 in Hamilton, Upper Canada) was a farmer and hotel owner, a Loyalist who moved to Canada following the American Revolution, and one of the city founders of Hamilton, Ontario. Married to Rebecca Land who was the daughter of Robert Land and Phoebe Scott, both United Empire Loyalists.

Hughson was among 10,000 Loyalists who moved to New Brunswick in 1783, following the American revolution, eventually moving to Upper Canada where present day Hamilton is. He received a grant of 2,700 acres (11 km^{2}) in Hamilton, May 1792. Hughson's land extended from Main Street to the Bay, between present day James Street and Mary Street. He was a farmer and also started up a newspaper called the Upper Canada Phoenix, in Dundas, Ontario. Also an original stock holder of the Gore Bank in 1836.

== Tribute ==
Hughson Street in the city of Hamilton, Ontario is named after him. Other streets in the city were named after his family members: James, Rebecca and Catharine. Married to Rebecca Land.
