= Main Street (Hamilton, Ontario) =

Road in Hamilton, Ontario, Canada

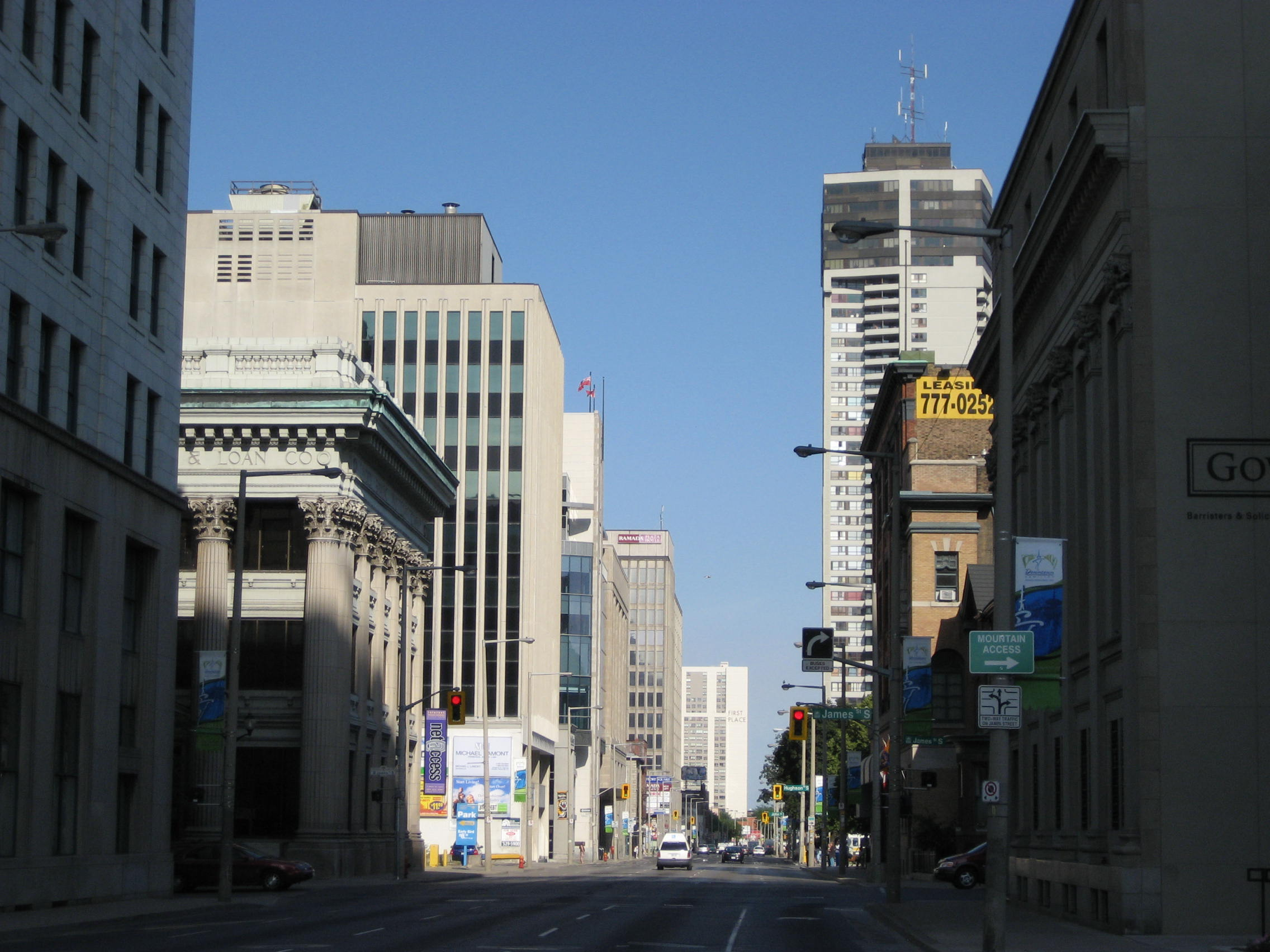
Main Street, looking East

Main Street is a major street in Hamilton, Ontario, Canada. It starts in Ancaster as a two way street, where Wilson Ave turns into Main Street after passing Filman Rd. Just before crossing Ontario Highway 403 from Westdale, it turns into a one way street east bound and stays that way throughout the city until it reaches the Delta, where Main Street and King Street intersect with each other and both streets return to two way traffic, until it reaches the Queenston Traffic Circle, where it continues as a residential street until it ends at Reid Ave.

== History ==
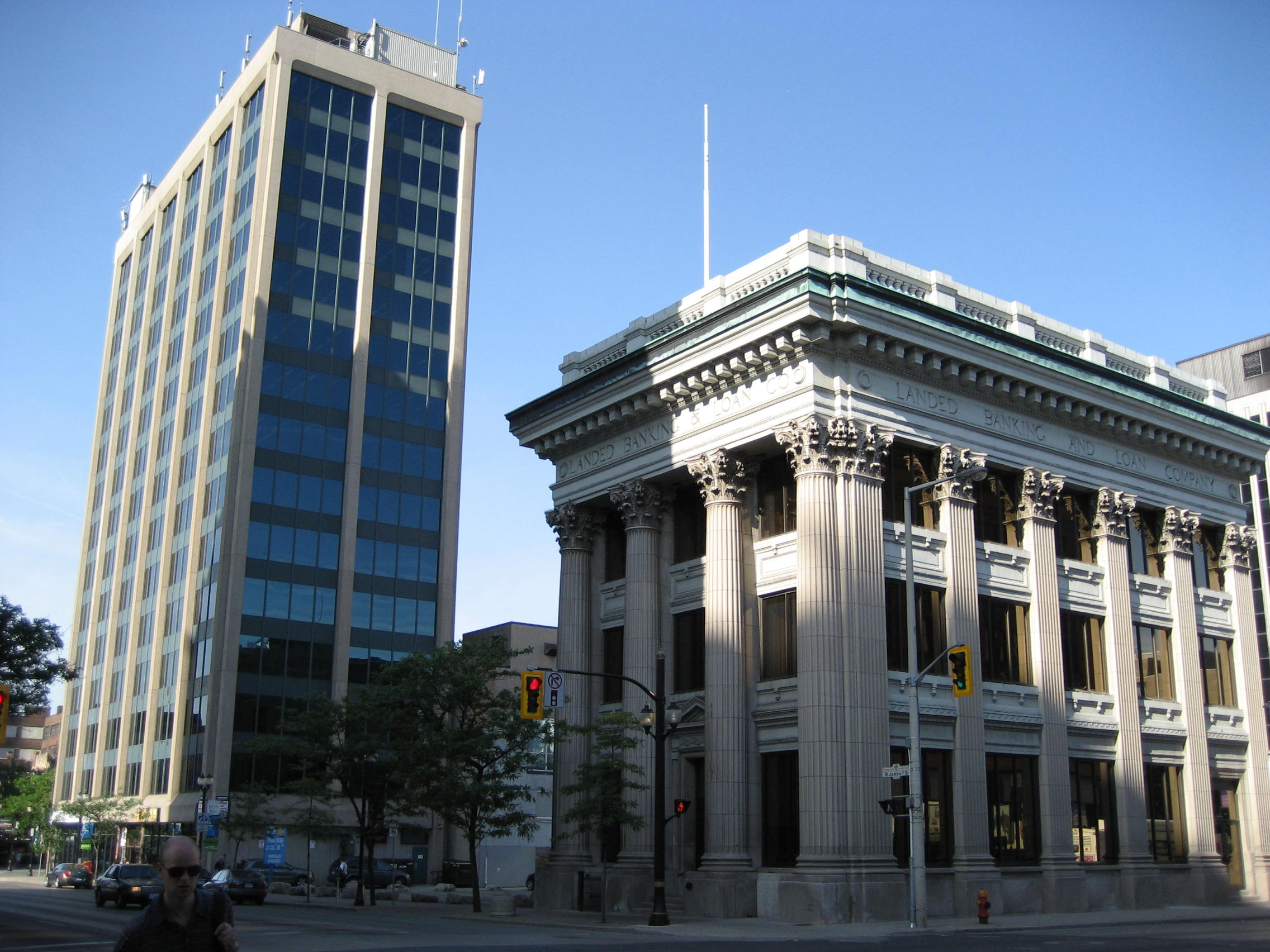
Landed Banking & Loan Co. Building, Main Street East

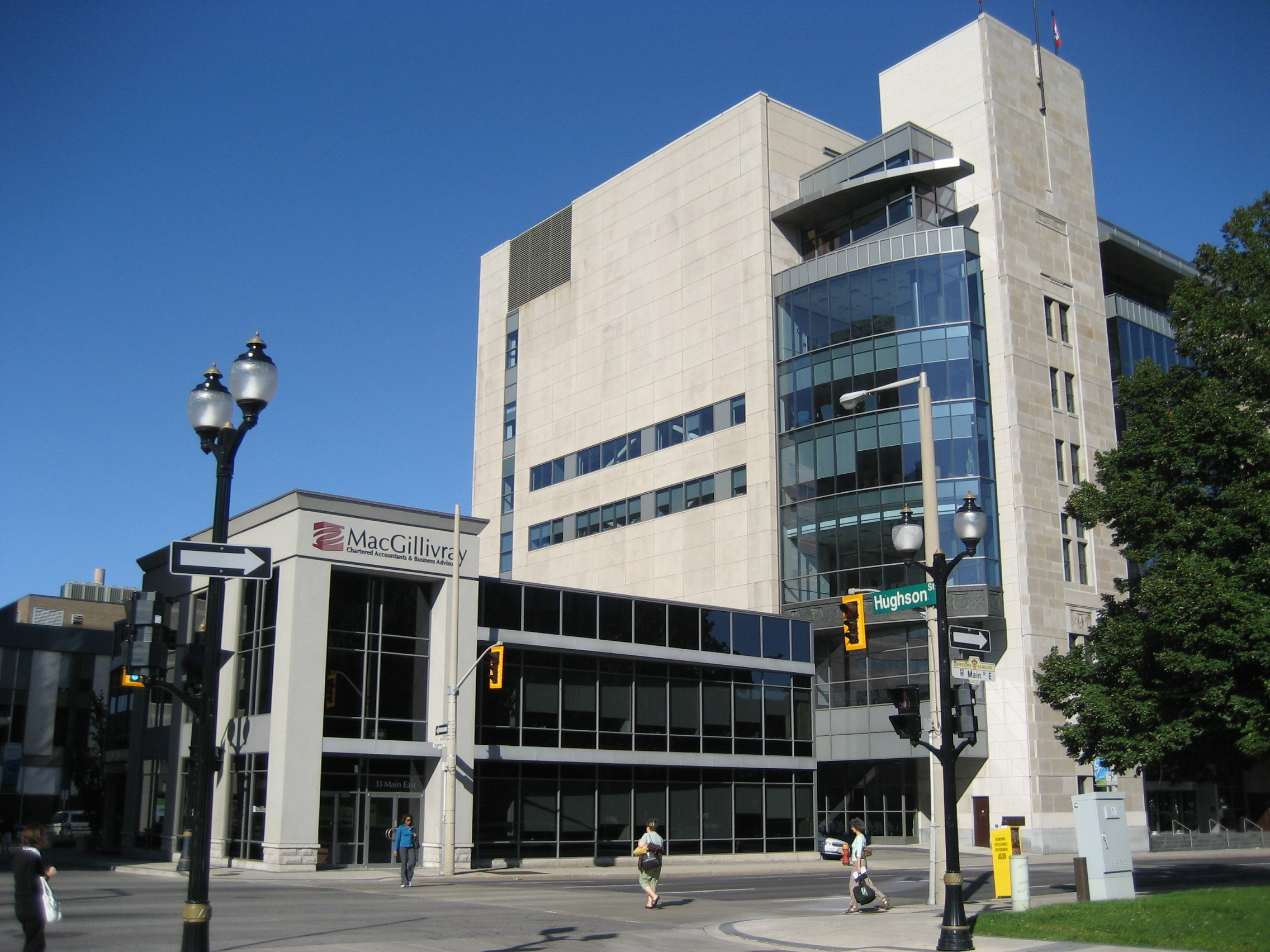
John Sopinka Courthouse, Main Street East

Main Street was originally called Court Street, after the first courthouse that stood on it. It is now called Main Street because it formed the "main" concession line of Barton Township.

On June 20, 1877, the first commercial telephone service in Canada began in Hamilton, Ontario. Hugh Cossart Baker, Jr. learned of Alexander Graham Bell's invention in 1877 at the Philadelphia International Exposition and from there decided to test the communication tool in Hamilton. Hugh Cossart Baker Jr. is credited with making the first telephone exchange in the British Empire from an office building (Exchange Building) at the corner of James and Main Street East which still stands there today (March 2007).

In 1925, The first traffic lights in Canada went into operation at the Delta. (11 June 1925).

McMaster University arrived in Hamilton in 1930 from Bloor Street in Toronto. The total student population at McMaster University is well over 27,000. Almost two-thirds of the students come from outside the immediate Hamilton region.

Built in 1931, Westdale Secondary School was immediately deemed the largest composite school in the British Empire, having cost $1.3 million to build and consisting of 4.7 hectares of building, grounds and athletic fields.

== Landmarks ==
- Crystal Palace Site
- Wentworth County Court House Site

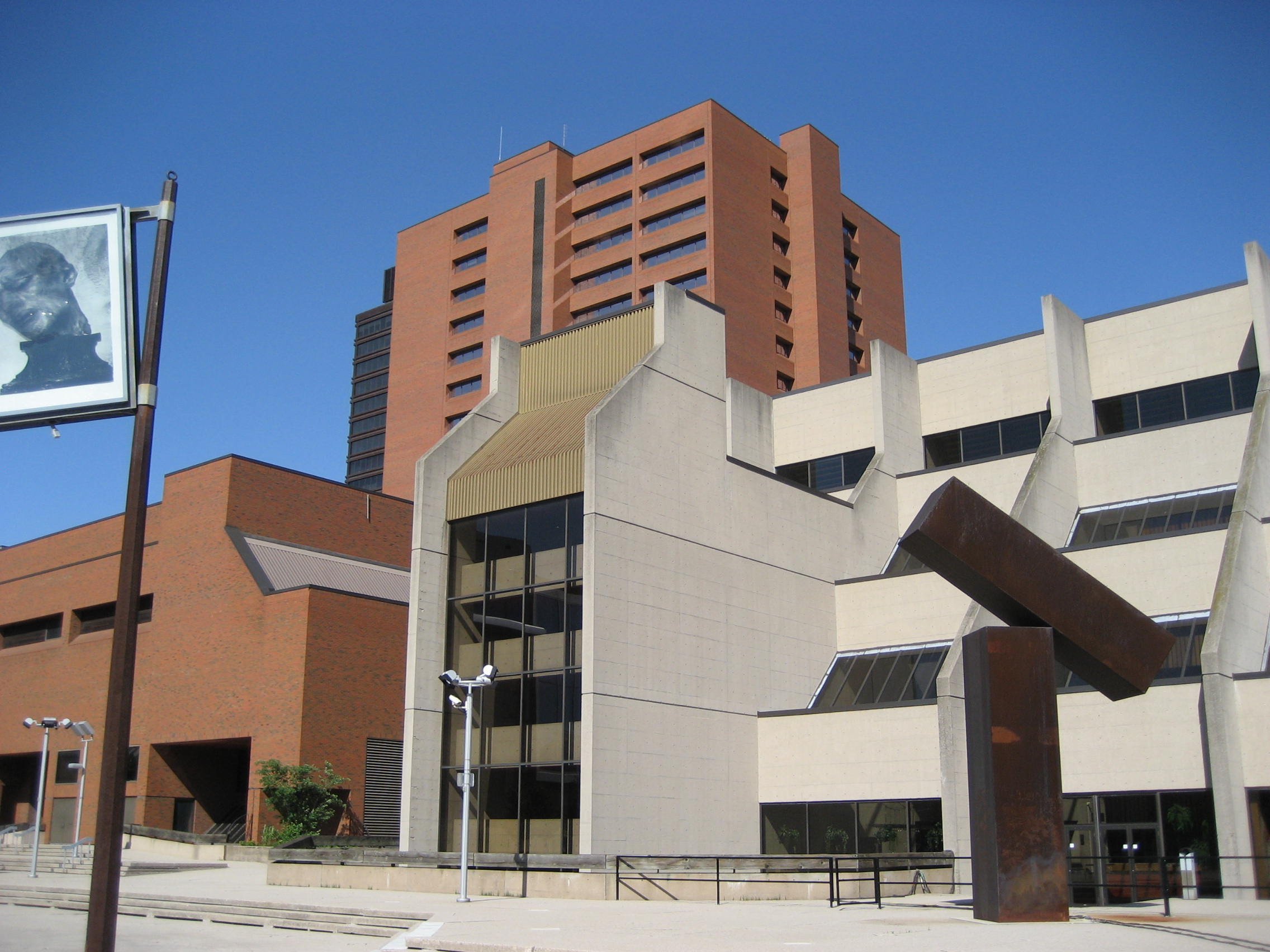
Convention Centre & Hamilton Place Auditorium

Note: Listing of Landmarks from West to East.

- White Chapel Cemetery
- CNIB building
- Canadian Martyrs Elementary School
- McMaster University
- Scottish Rite Castle/ Masonic Centre, Originally the home of George Elias Tuckett, (1835-1900), Tuckett Tobacco Company owner + Hamilton's 27th Mayor in 1896. (just South of Main Street on Queen Street South
- Hess Village
- Bay 200, residential apartment building (Hamilton's 10th-tallest building, just South of Main Street West)
- Hamilton-Wentworth District School Board Building
- New Hamilton City Hall
- Irving Zucker Sculpture Court
- MacNab Street Presbyterian Church
- Hamilton Street Railway
- Hamilton Public Library
- Canadian Football Hall of Fame Museum
- Bank of Montreal Building (Hamilton) (converted to a National Law firm office)
- Landed Banking and Loan Company building
- Exchange Building (site of the first telephone exchange in the British Empire)
- John Sopinka Courthouse
- Hamilton Courthouse
- Landmark Place (Hamilton's tallest building)
- First Place Hamilton
- Don Cherry's Grapevine site
- St. Patrick Church
- St. Patrick Elementary School
- Cathedral Secondary School
- Columbia Elementary School
- Gage Park
- Hamilton Children's Museum (inside Gage Park)
- Gage Park Bandshell (concert stage)
- Gage Park fountain
- Memorial Elementary School
- Ottawa Street Shopping District - "Textile District"
- Delta Secondary School
- Montgomery Park
- Burlington Synchronized Swimming Club
- Queenston Traffic Circle (Queenston Road branches off from this point)
- Sir Winston Churchill Park
- Sir Winston Churchill Secondary School
- Parkdale Park
- Parkdale Arena
- Roxborough Park

== Communities ==
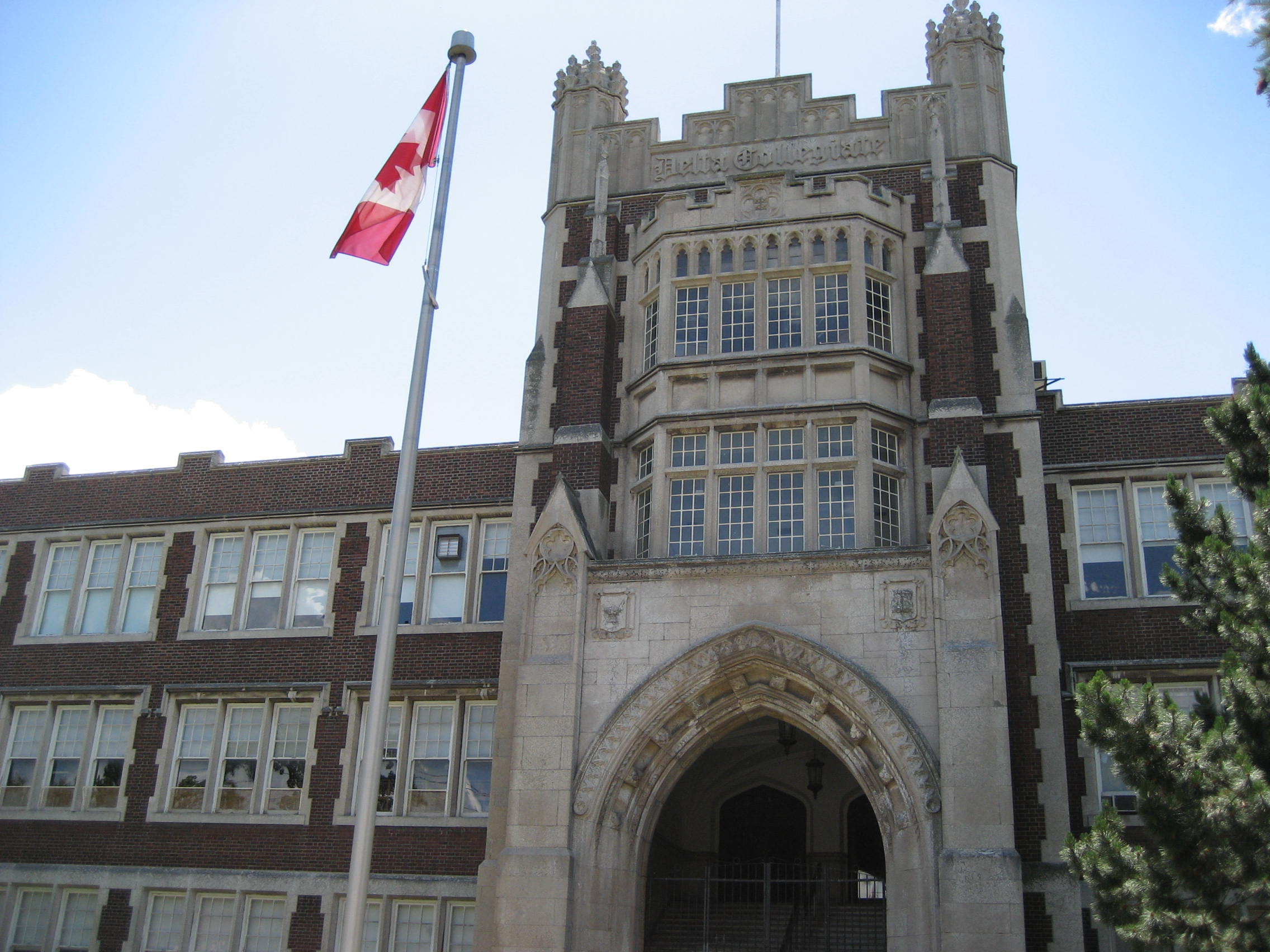
Delta Secondary School

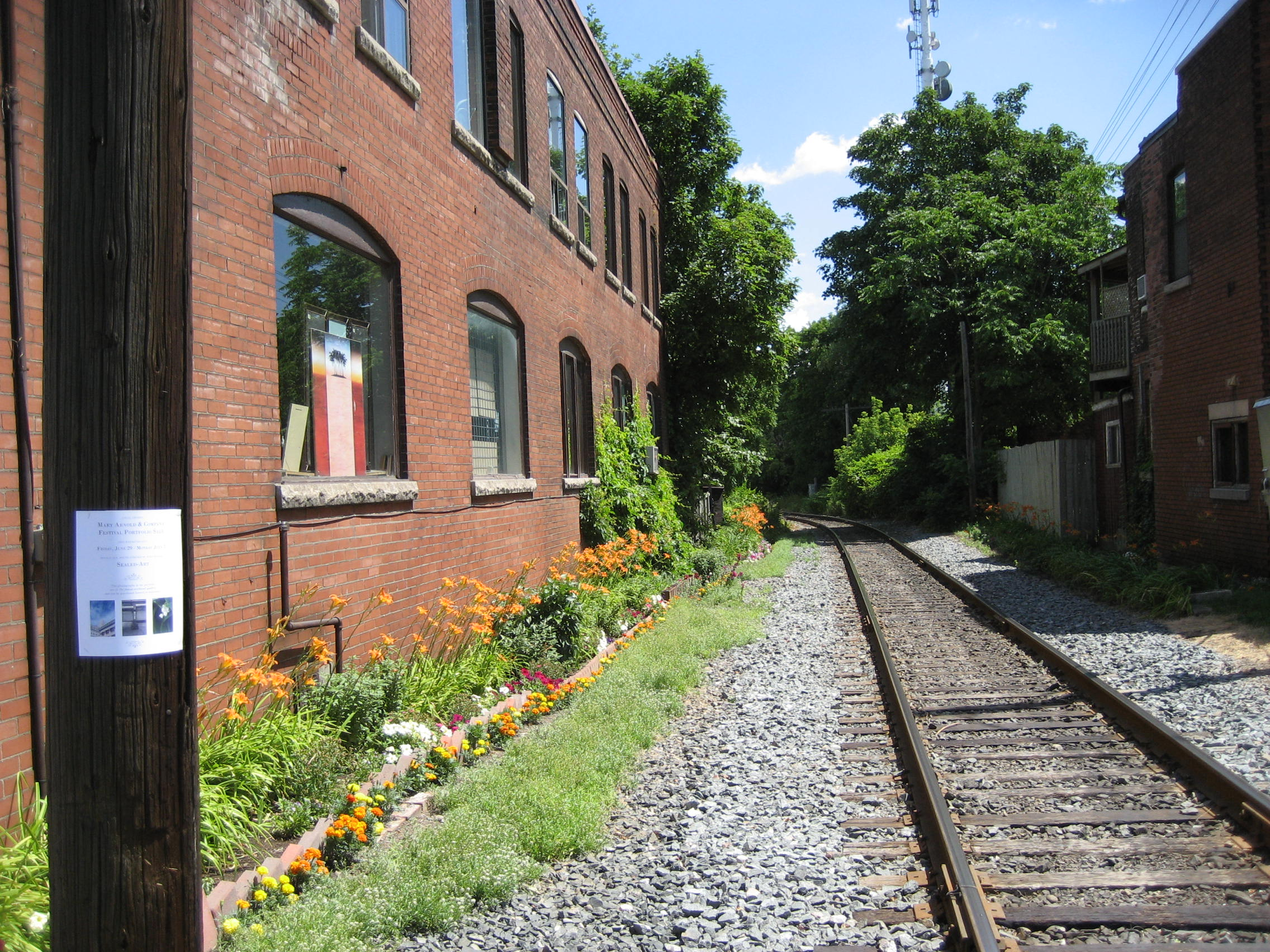
Railway line at Main East, near Gage Avenue

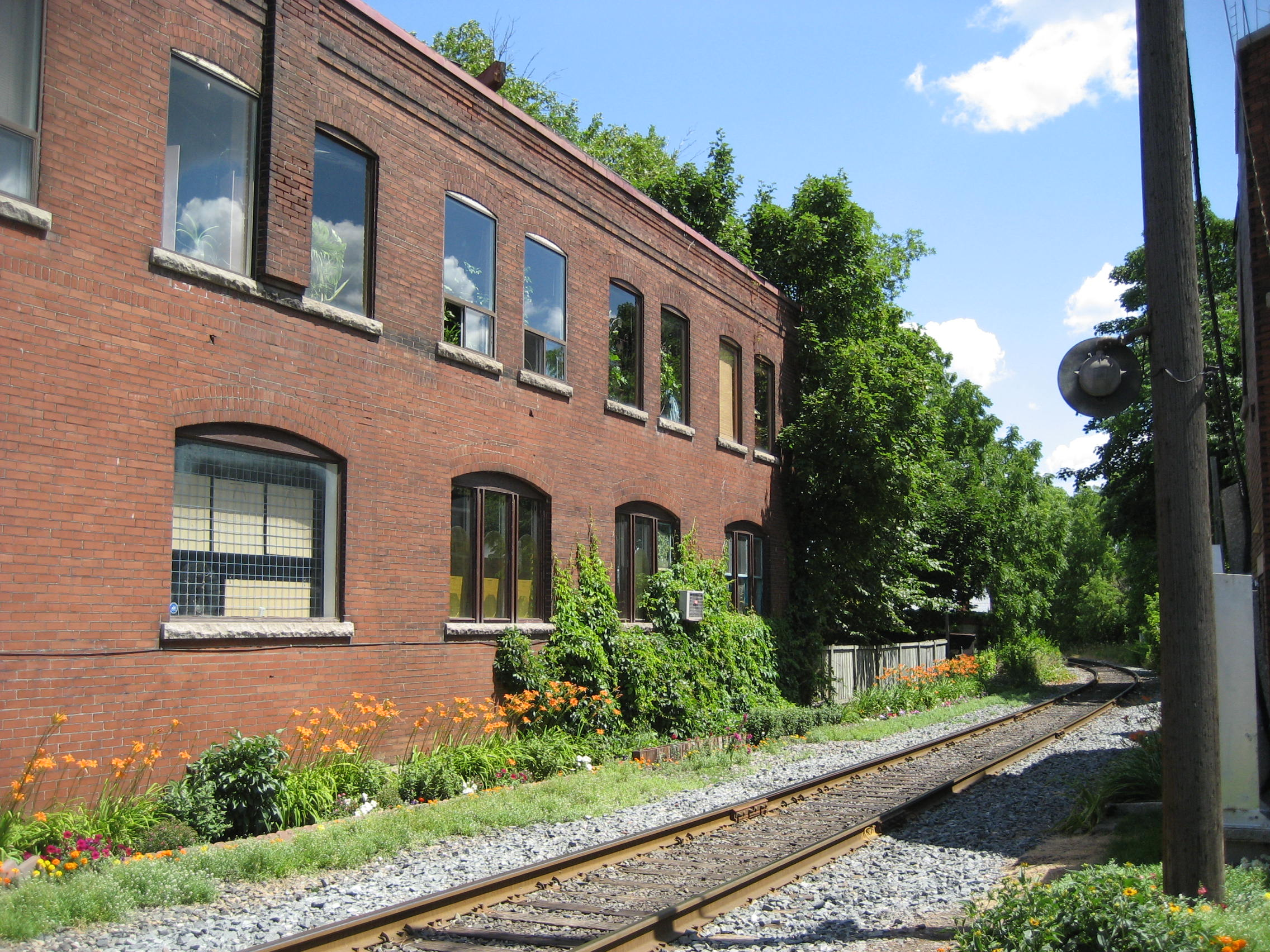
Railway line at Main East, near Gage Avenue

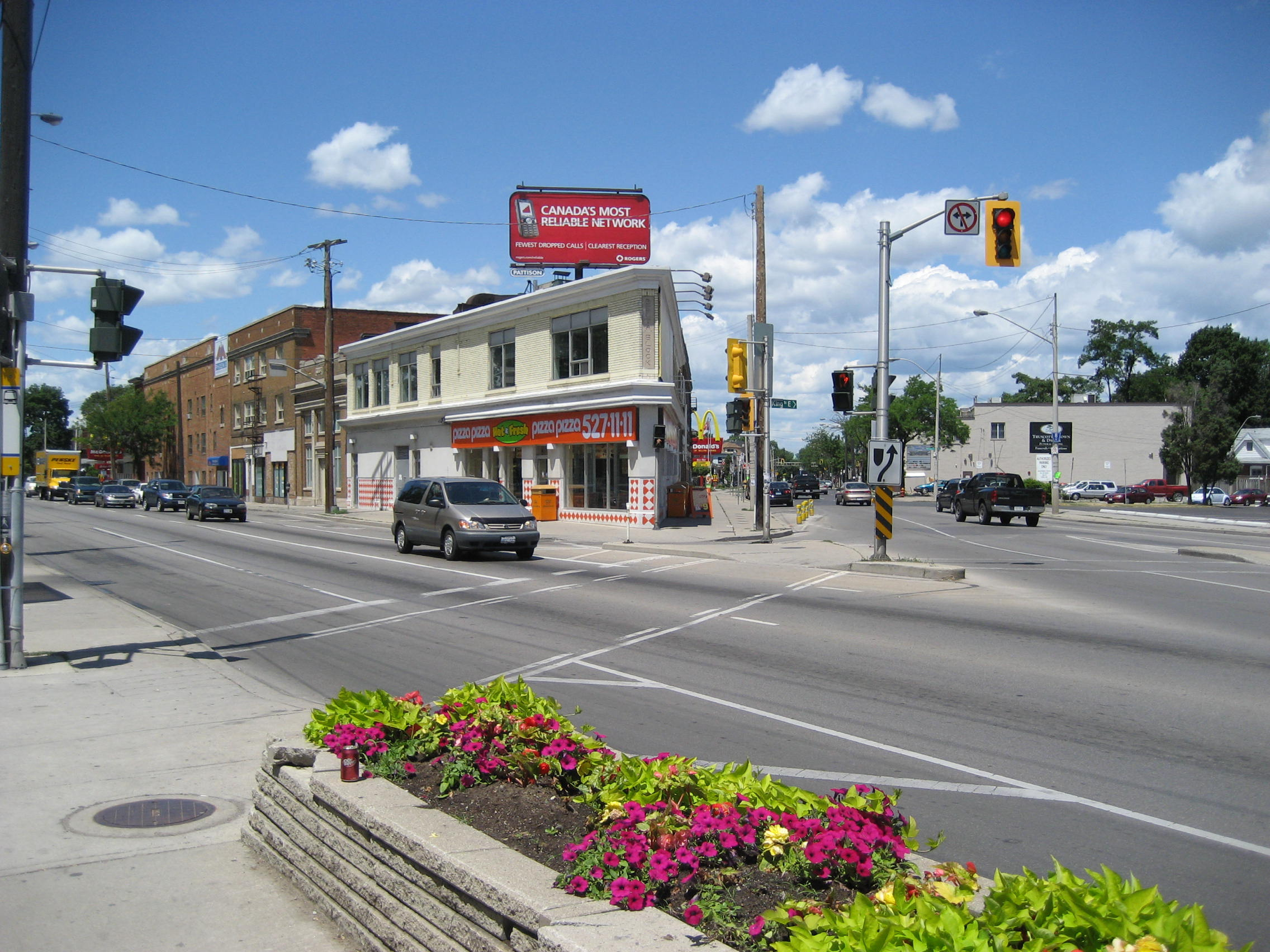
The Delta, where King & Main Streets cross over

Note: Listing of neighbourhoods from West to East.

- Ainslie Wood
- Westdale
- Strathcona/ Kirkendall North
- Central/ Durand
- Beasley/ Corktown
- Landsdale/ Stinson
- Gibson/ St. Clair
- Stipley/ Blakeley
- Crown Point West/ Delta West
- Crown Point East/ Delta East
- Homeside/ Bartonville
- Normanhurst
- McQuesten West

== Gallery ==
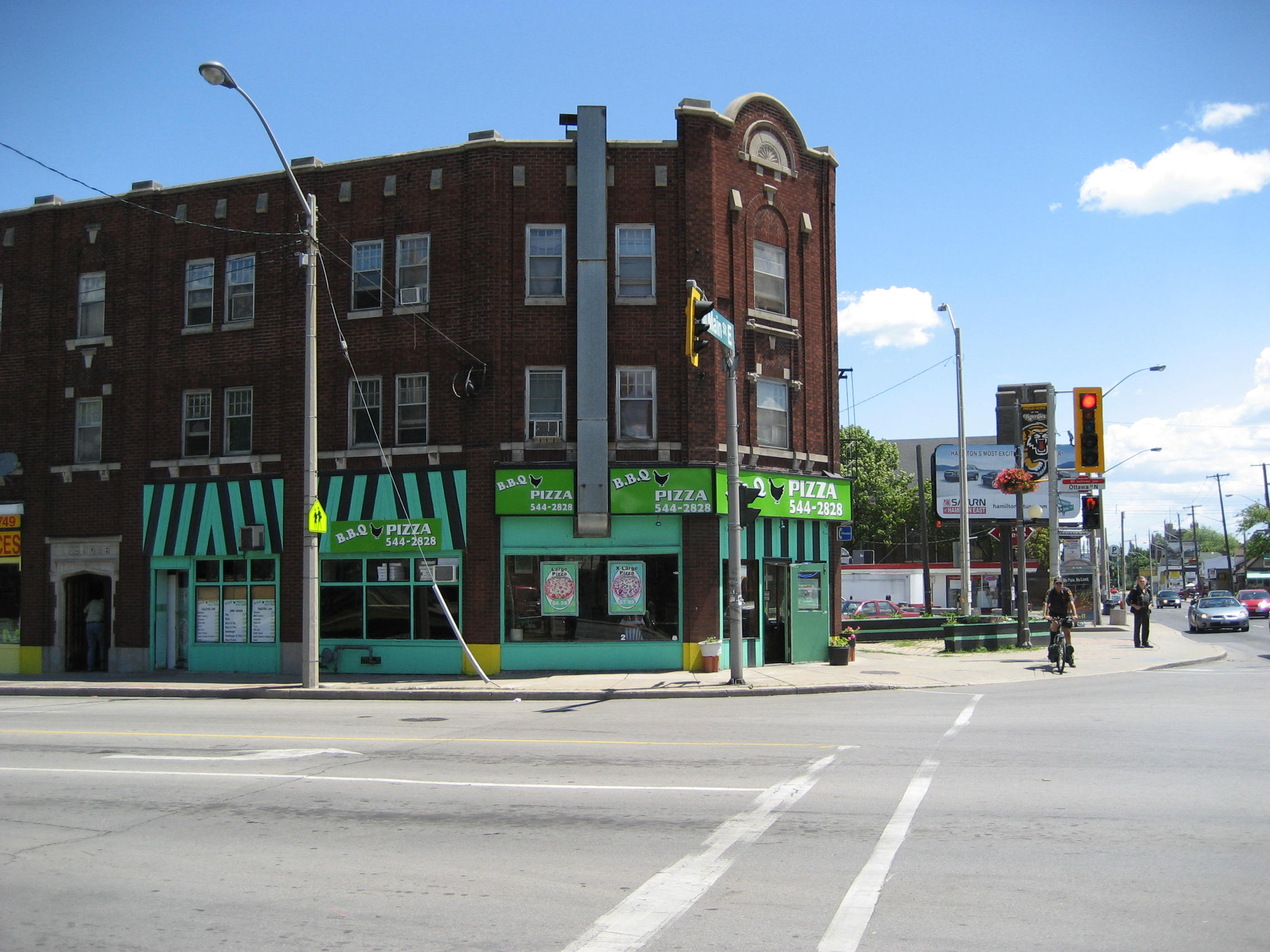
Corner of Main & Ottawa Streets

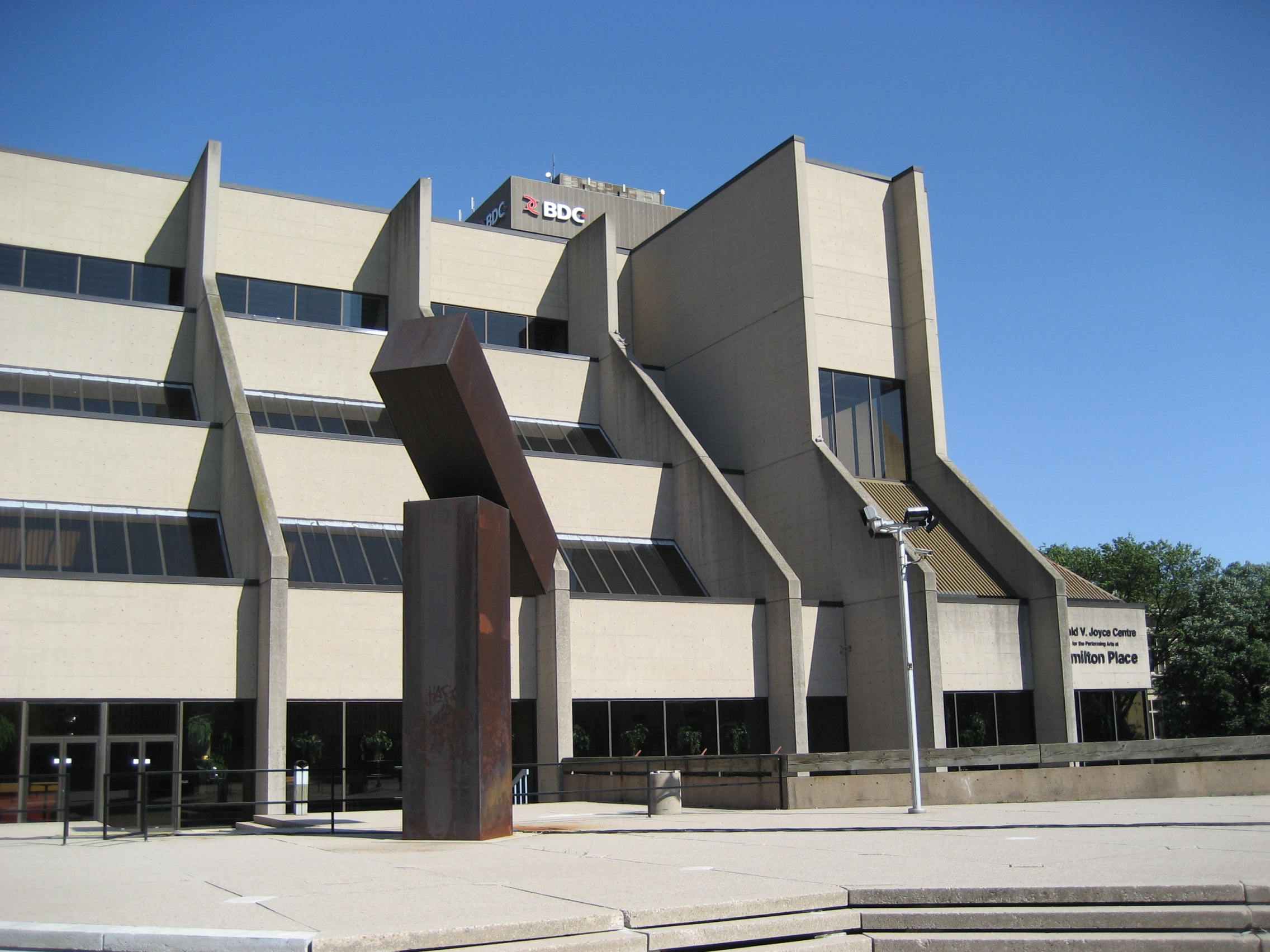
Hamilton Place

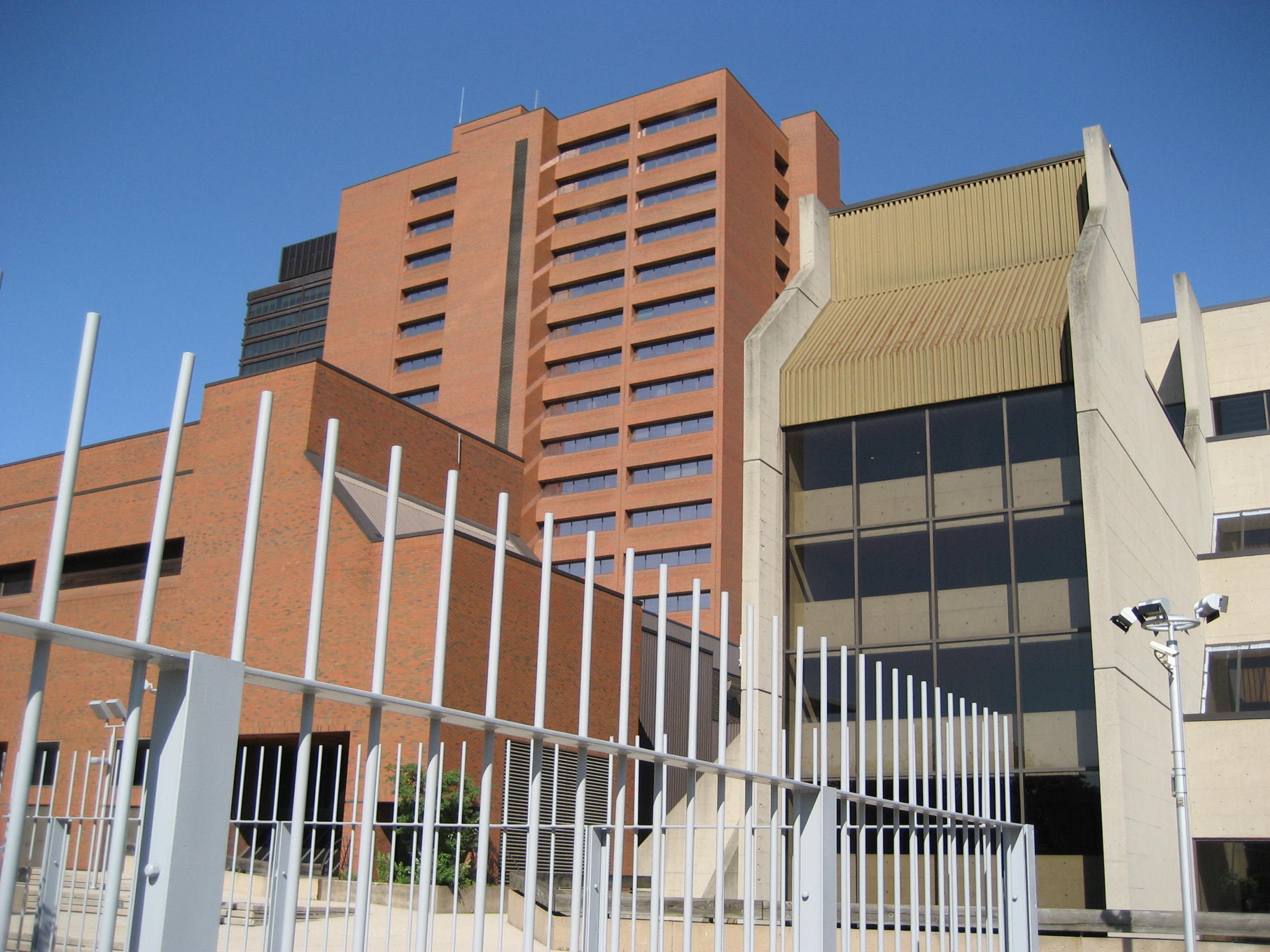
Hamilton Place/ Convention Centre
