= George Tuckett =

George Tuckett may refer to:

- George Tuckett (politician) (1873–1963), Australian politician
- George Elias Tuckett (1835–1900), New Zealand politician
