= Queen Street, Hamilton, Ontario =

Lower City arterial road in Hamilton, Ontario, Canada

Coordinates: 43.2644°N 79.8763°W

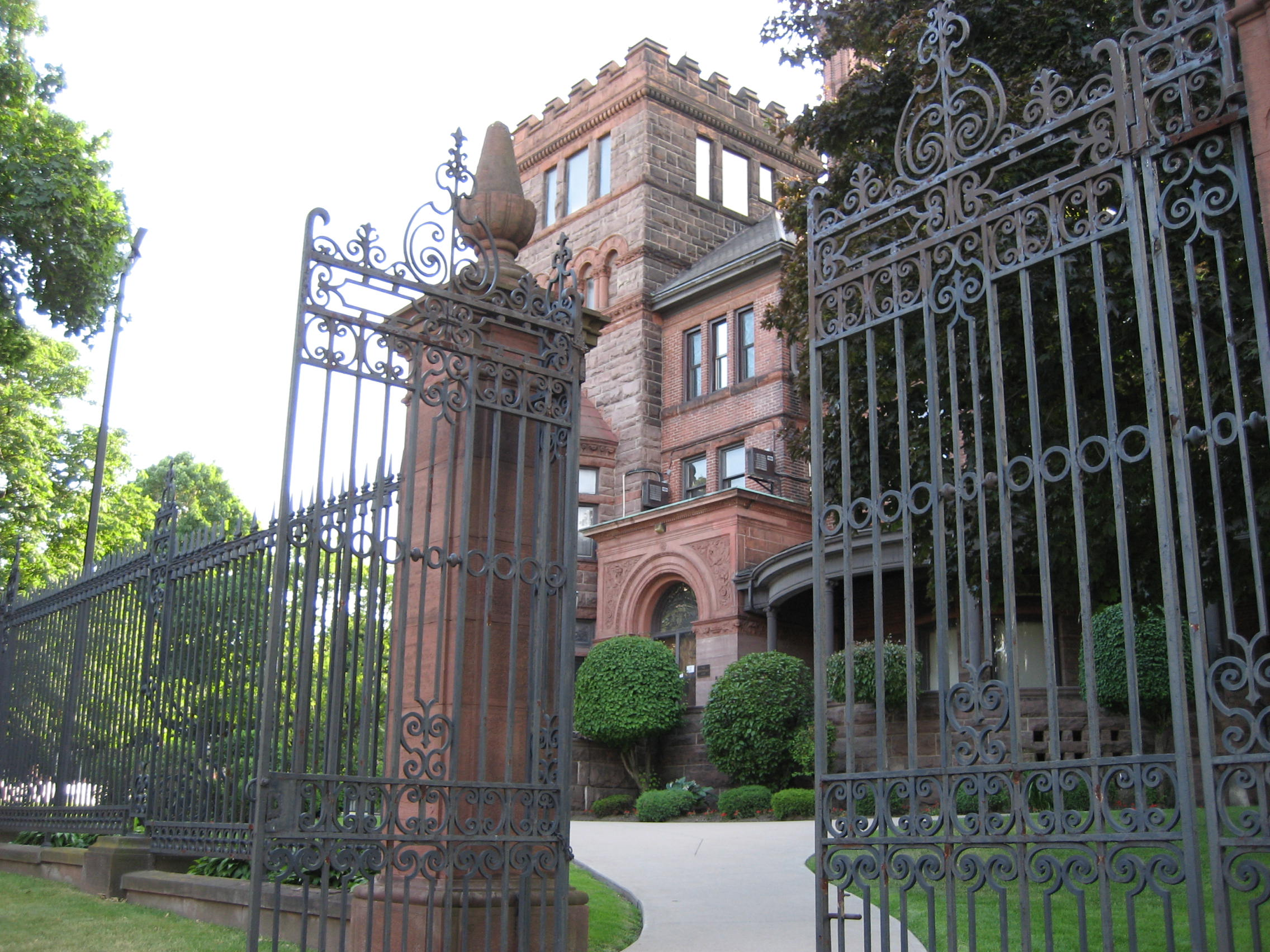
Scottish Rite Castle/ Masonic Centre, onetime home of George Elias Tuckett, who owned the Tuckett Tobacco Company. He was also Hamilton's 27th Mayor.

Queen Street is a Lower City arterial road in Hamilton, Ontario, Canada. It starts off at Beckett Drive, a mountain-access road in the city and is a two-way street up to King Street West and a one-way street (southbound) the rest of the way north up to the Canadian National Railway Yard, where the road turns right, merging with Stuart Street which travels in a west–east direction.

== History ==
Queen Street was named after Queen Caroline of Brunswick, wife of King George IV.

Queen Street forms the western boundary line of the Durand neighbourhood. Durand is also bounded by Main Street to the north, James Street and James Mountain Road to the east and the Niagara Escarpment to the south. With the turn of the 20th century, luxurious new residences were built along Markland and Aberdeen Avenues and to the south in the lee of the escarpment. These residences reflected the entrepreneurial spirit of those who made their fortunes in transportation, finance, industry, and commerce in one of North Americas major centres, Hamilton. By 1920, the Durand neighbourhood was considered to be the “exclusive” neighbourhood in Hamilton. However, the Great Depression and the Second World War took their tolls on the fortunes of many of the established Durand households. Owners could no longer afford the taxes and upkeep on their homes, and many of the grander residences were either demolished and replaced with middle-class low-rise housing, or were renovated to become low-rise apartment buildings. Much of the heritage of the neighbourhood survives today.

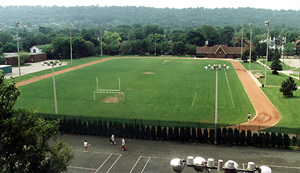
HAAA Grounds - Photo by Mike F. Campbell

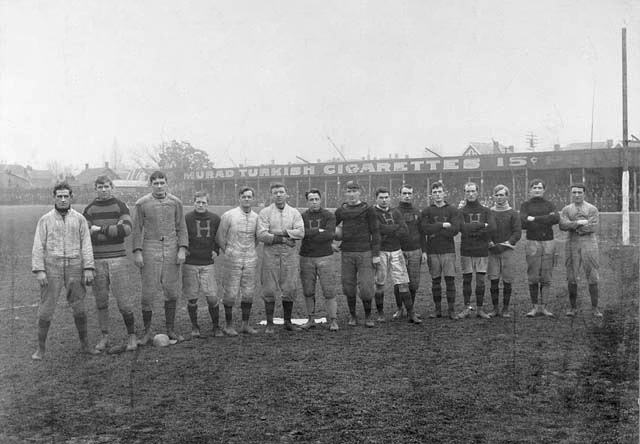
The Hamilton Tigers circa 1906, Hamilton Amateur Athletic Association Grounds.

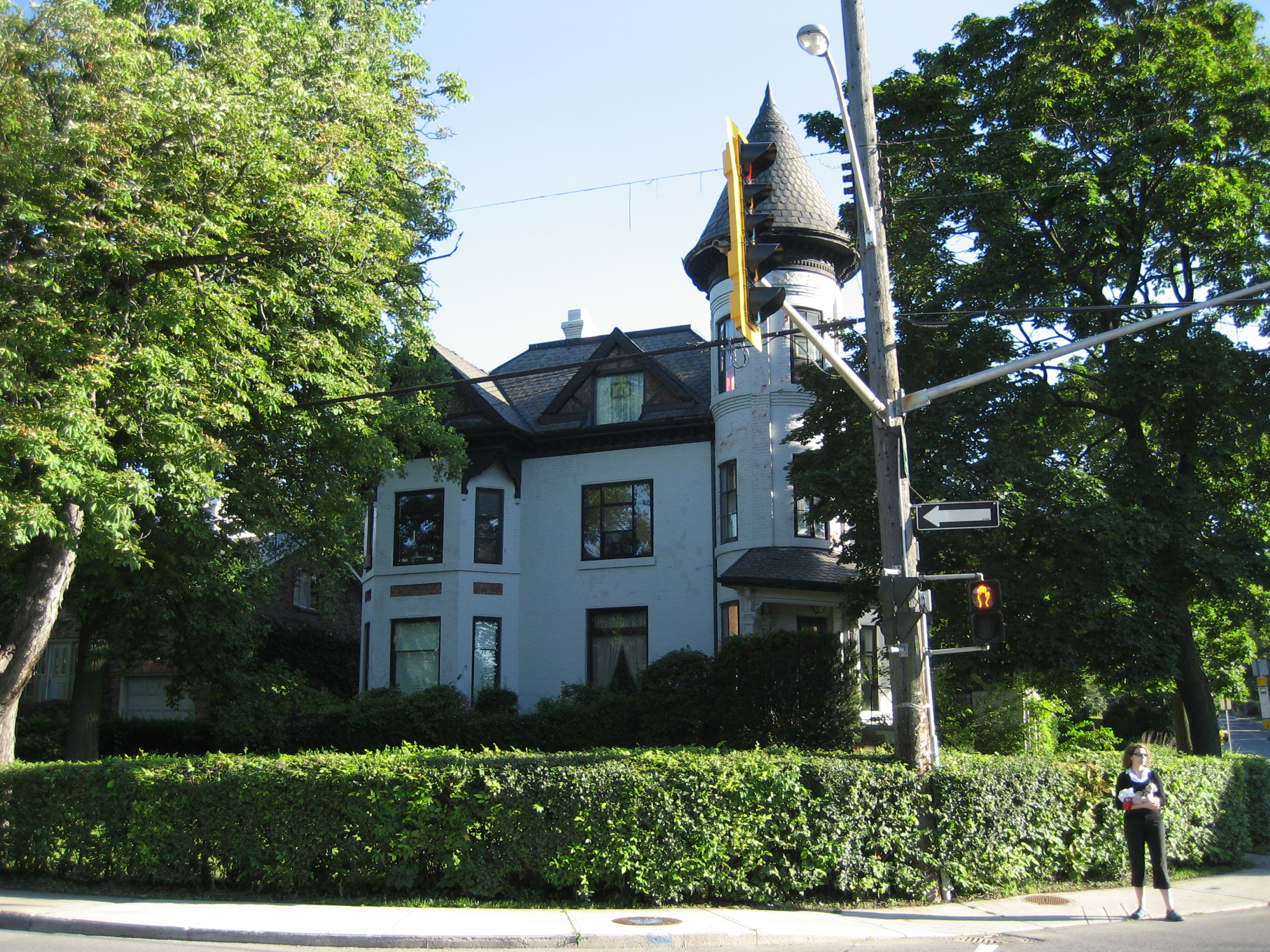
Durand neighbourhood, Queen Street South

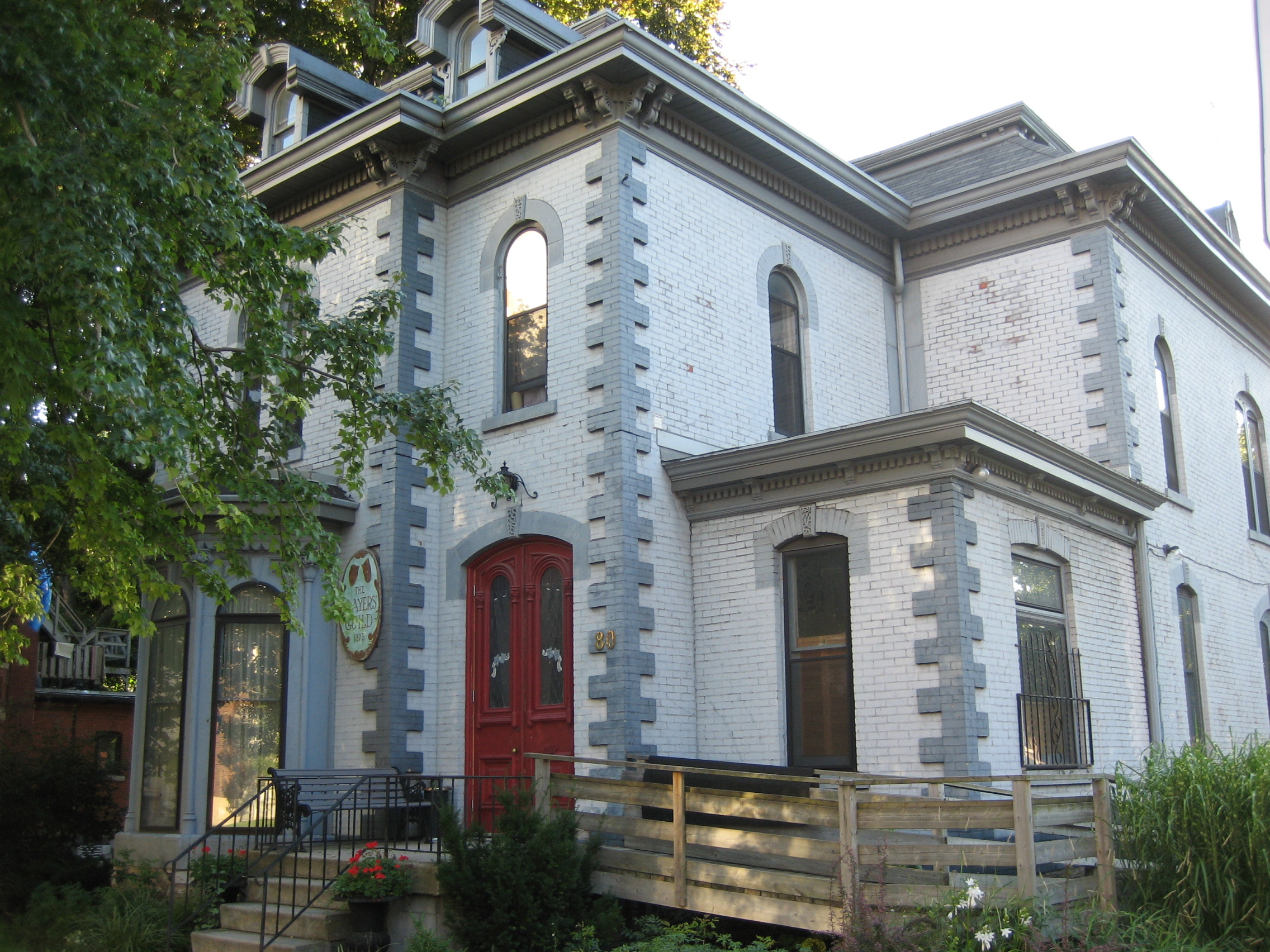
Player's Guild Hamilton Inc.

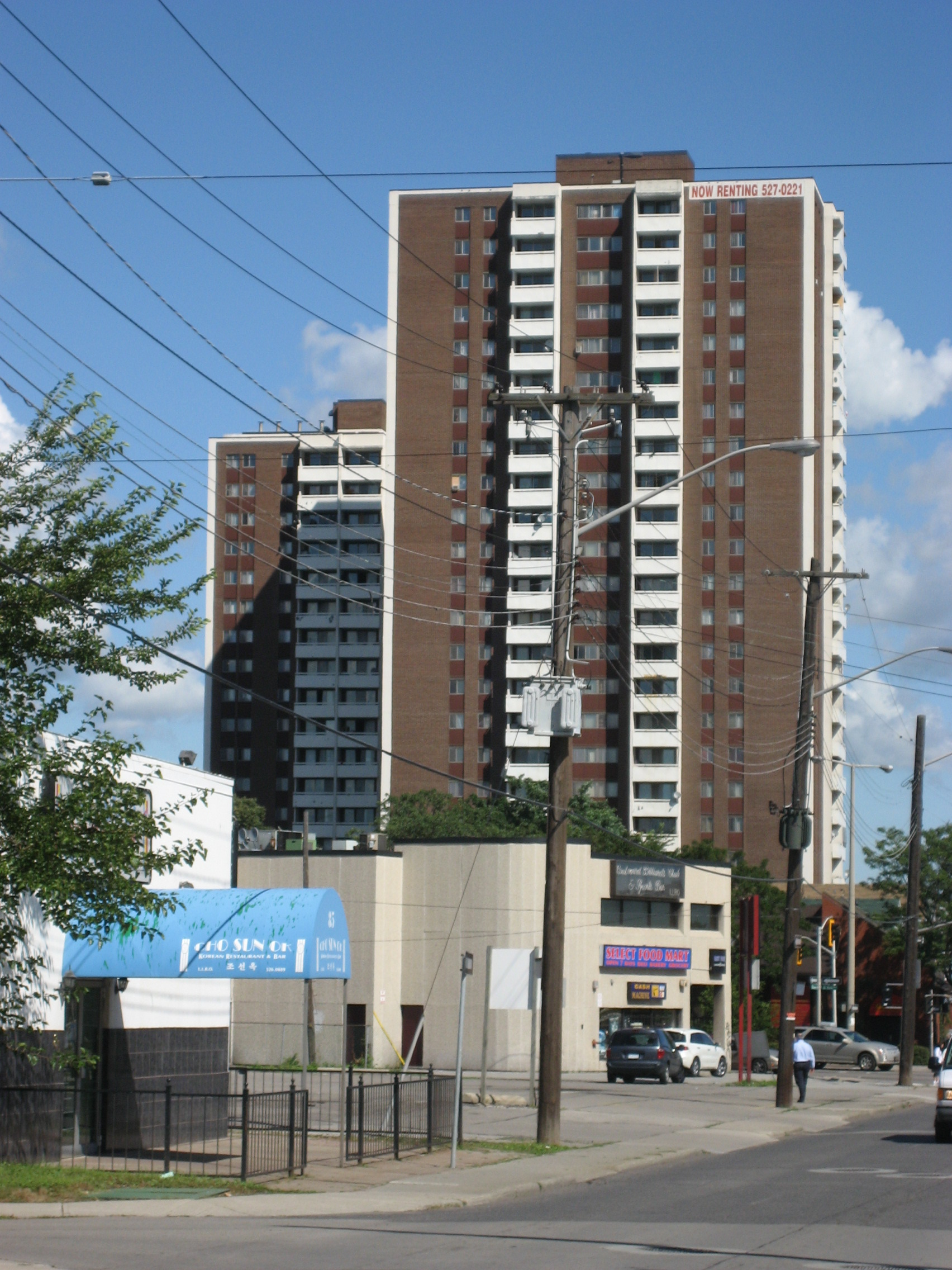
Queen's Terrace/ Oxford Heights, apartment buildings

The Hamilton A.A.A. Grounds, (Hamilton Amateur Athletic Association Grounds), is a park that was home to the Hamilton Tiger-Cats from 1872-1949. Entrance to the park at Queen Street South is right before Charlton Avenue West. Today it is also the site of the Hamilton Tennis Club. Today Ivor Wynne Stadium is the home of the Hamilton Tiger-Cats. It's off of Beachwood Avenue, 2 blocks West of Gage Avenue North.

The TH&B Railway came into Hamilton in 1895. A railway tunnel was then constructed from Queen to Park Street to cut down on the noise, pollution and disruption for the wealthy families who lived South of Jackson Street in the Durand neighbourhood.

In 1964, Imperial Tobacco Company's Hamilton operations are moved to Guelph, Ontario. Originally it was known as the Tuckett Tobacco Company which was started up by George Elias Tuckett, (1835–1900), who was also Hamilton's 27th Mayor in 1896. Today the property is the site of two high-rise apartment buildings, Queen's Terrace and Oxford Heights. Tuckett's home was the Scottish Rite Castle, also on Queen Street, remains as one of Hamilton's most magnificent structures. At its peak the Tuckett Tobacco Company employed 600 workers and products were sold throughout the world. The first factory opened up in the 1860s near the intersection of King and Bay Streets. The Queen Street North factory opened up 28 February 1891 and stayed opened until 17 September 1966.

== Bruce Trail ==
One can reach the Bruce Trail via Queen Street South. The trail cuts through the city along the Niagara Escarpment (mountain) and used by many locals for a full days hike. The Trail is 430 miles (690 km) long and starts at Niagara Falls, passes through Hamilton and ends at the Bruce Peninsula. Hikers are led to scenic gorges, hidden waterfalls and places of quiet charm.

== Landmarks ==
Note: Listing of Landmarks from North to South.

- Canadian National Railway Yards
- A City Window & Glass, building
- Queen's Terrace/ Oxford Heights (25 & 20 storey building apartments)
- Gary Hill Parkette (park)
- Queen 75 (22 storey condominium tower)
- Queen Elizabeth Tower (18 storey apartment building)
- All Saints Church, Hamilton, Ontario
- Scottish Rite Castle, Originally the home of George Elias Tuckett, (1835–1900), Tuckett Tobacco Company owner + Hamilton's 27th Mayor in 1896.
  - Grand Lodge of Canada, behind the Scottish Rite Castle on King Street West
- Canadian Pacific Railway tunnel, (Tunnel extends from Queen to Park Street)
- Hess Village, Western end of George Street.
- Queen's Court, (2 building blocks, 3-stories each)
- Players' Guild of Hamilton, Inc. (theatre)
- Jackson Villa, (12-storey apartment building)
- Queensvilla Condominiums
- Capital Terrace, (20-storey apartment building)
- Savaria Tower, (14-storey apartment building)
- Pannonia Tower, (18-storey apartment building)
- Hamilton Amateur Athletic Association Grounds
  - Hamilton Tennis Club
- Beckett Drive, a Mountain-access road
- Bruce Trail
- Niagara Escarpment (mountain)

== Communities ==
Note: Listing of neighbourhoods from North to South

- Strathcona/ Central - (The financial center of Hamilton), Queen Street is the division between these two neighbourhoods.
- Kirkendall North/ Durand, Queen Street is the division between these two neighbourhoods.
- Kirkendall South

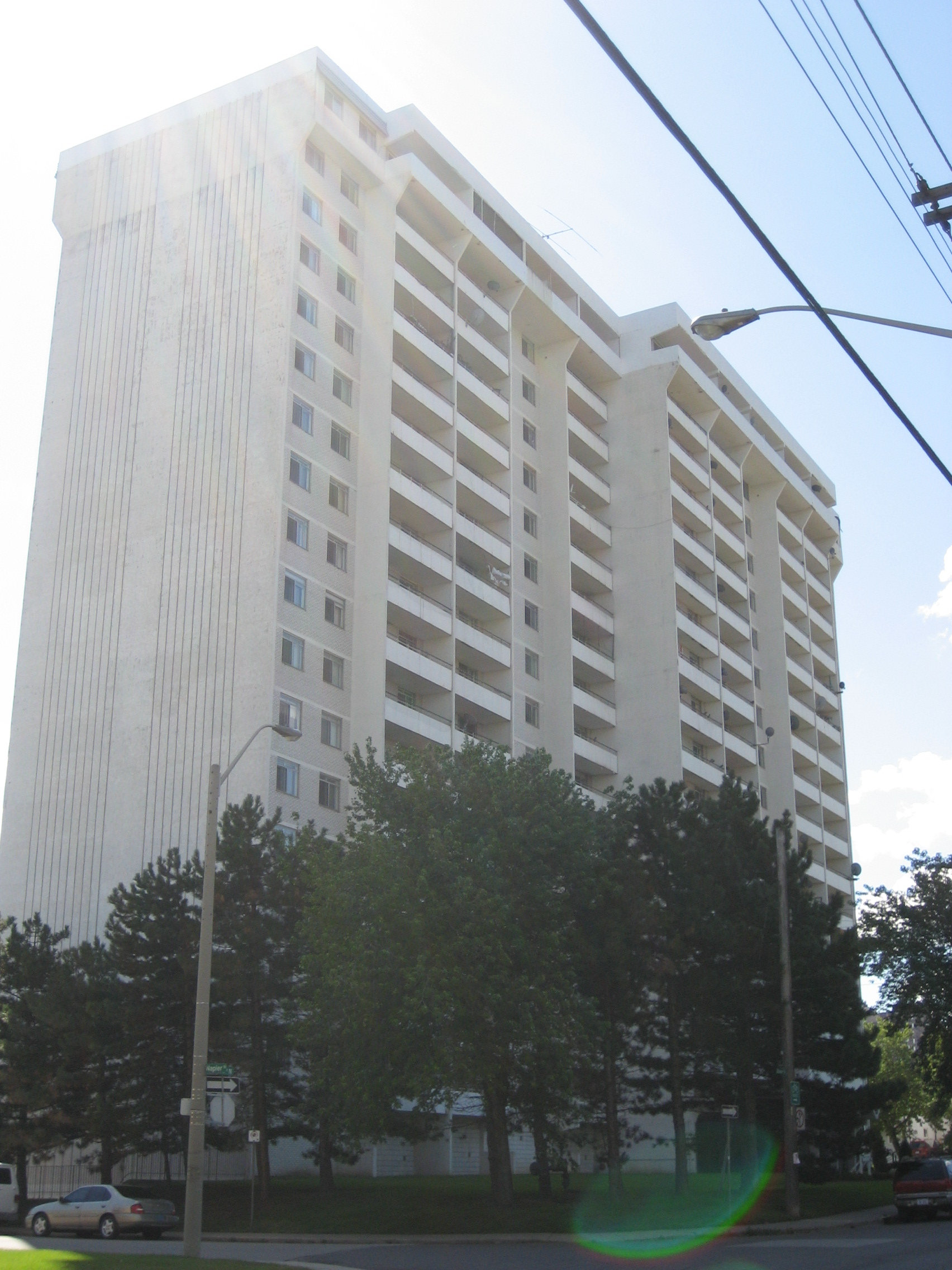
Queen Elizabeth Tower

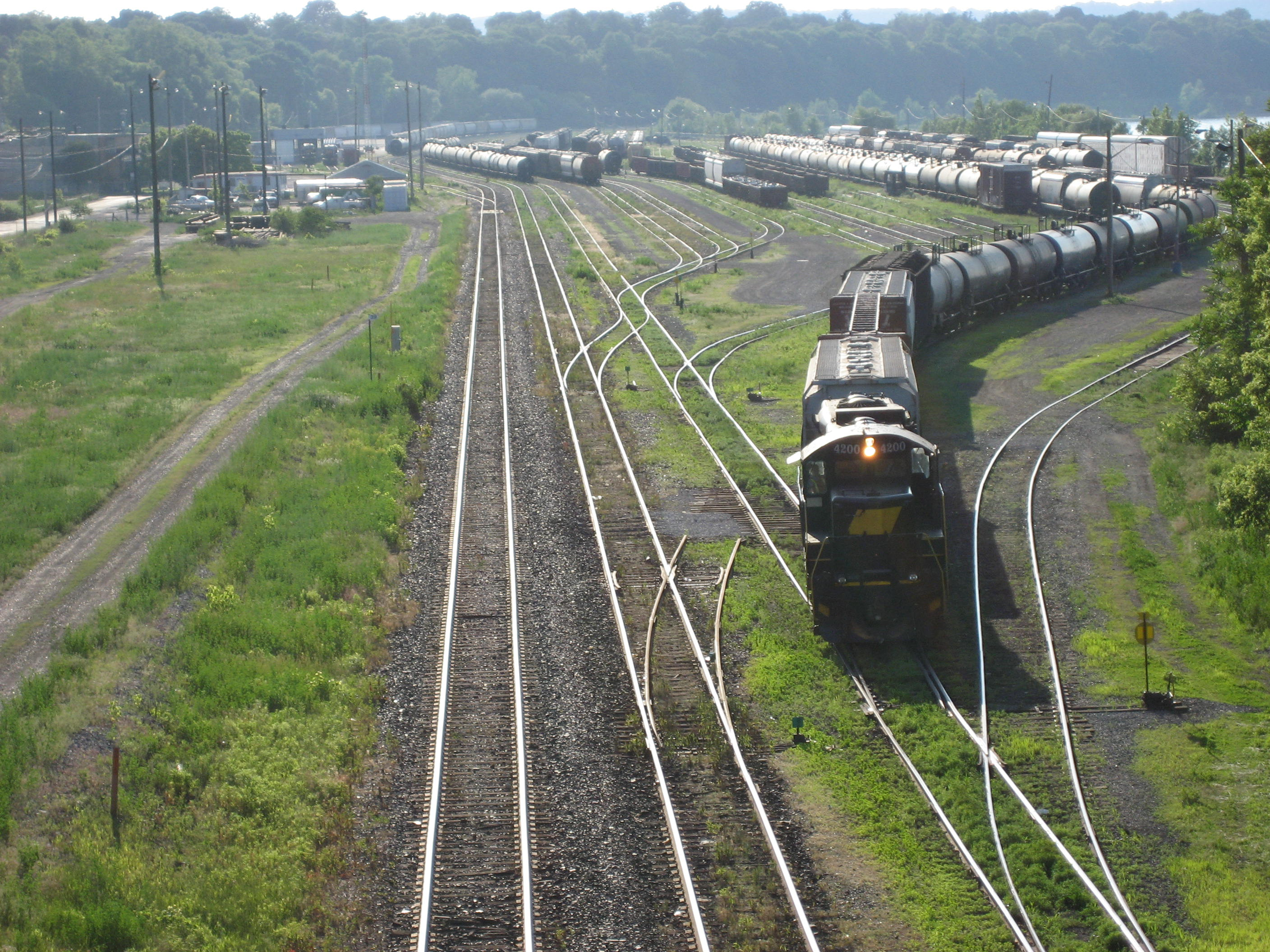
Canadian National Railway Yard, north of Queen Street by the waterfront

== Images ==
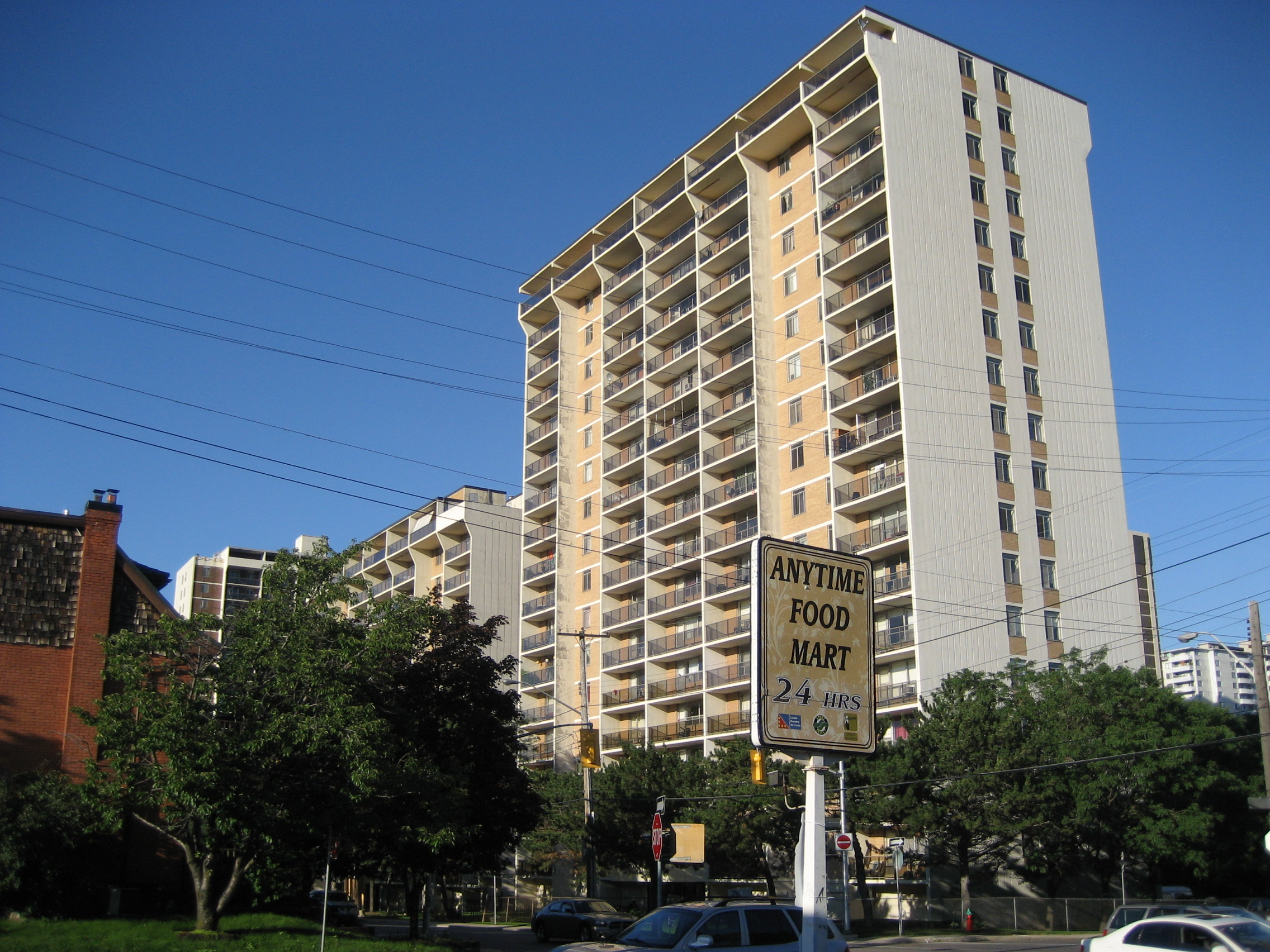
Pannonia Apartment building

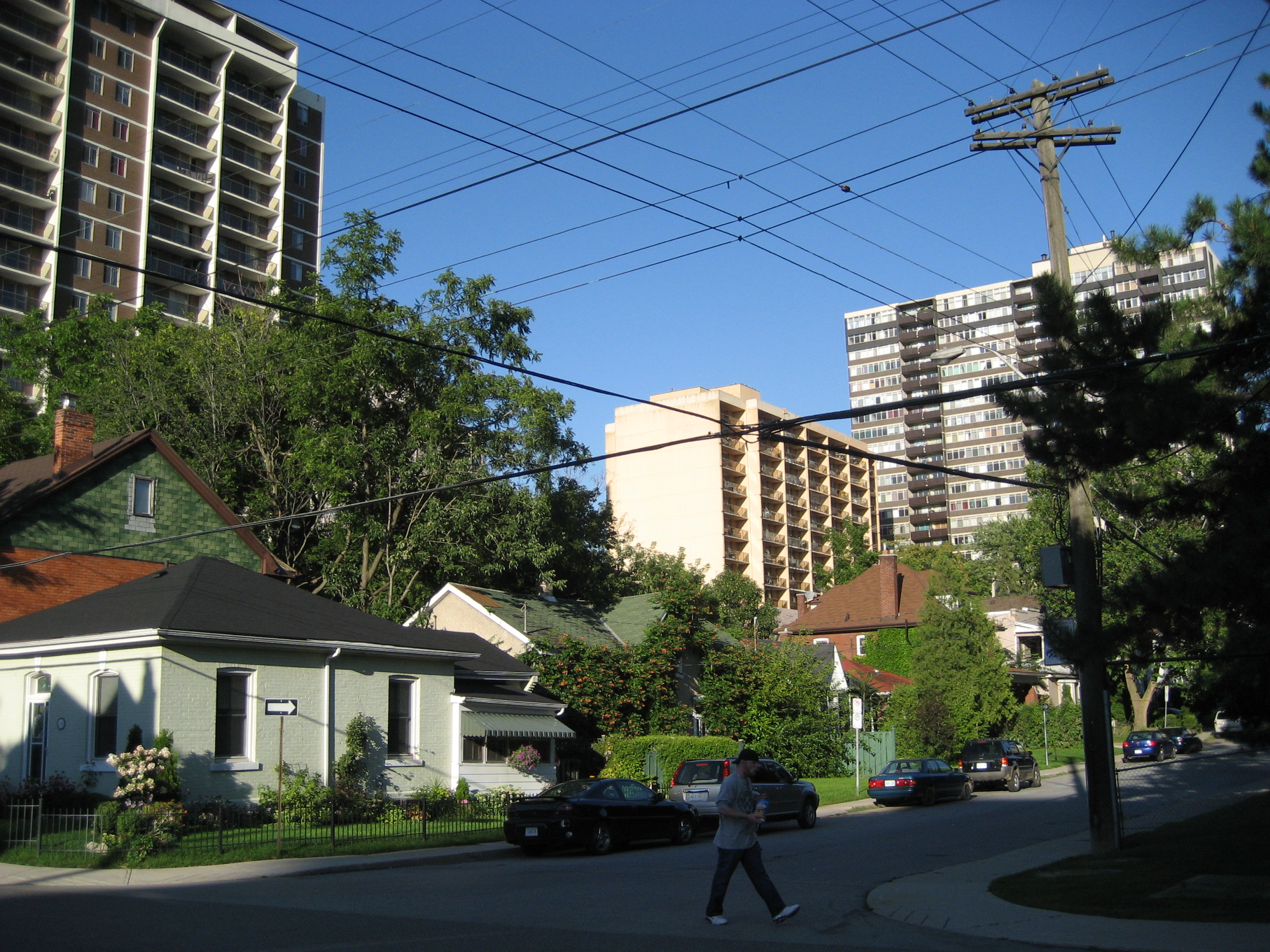
Corner of Queen & Bold Streets

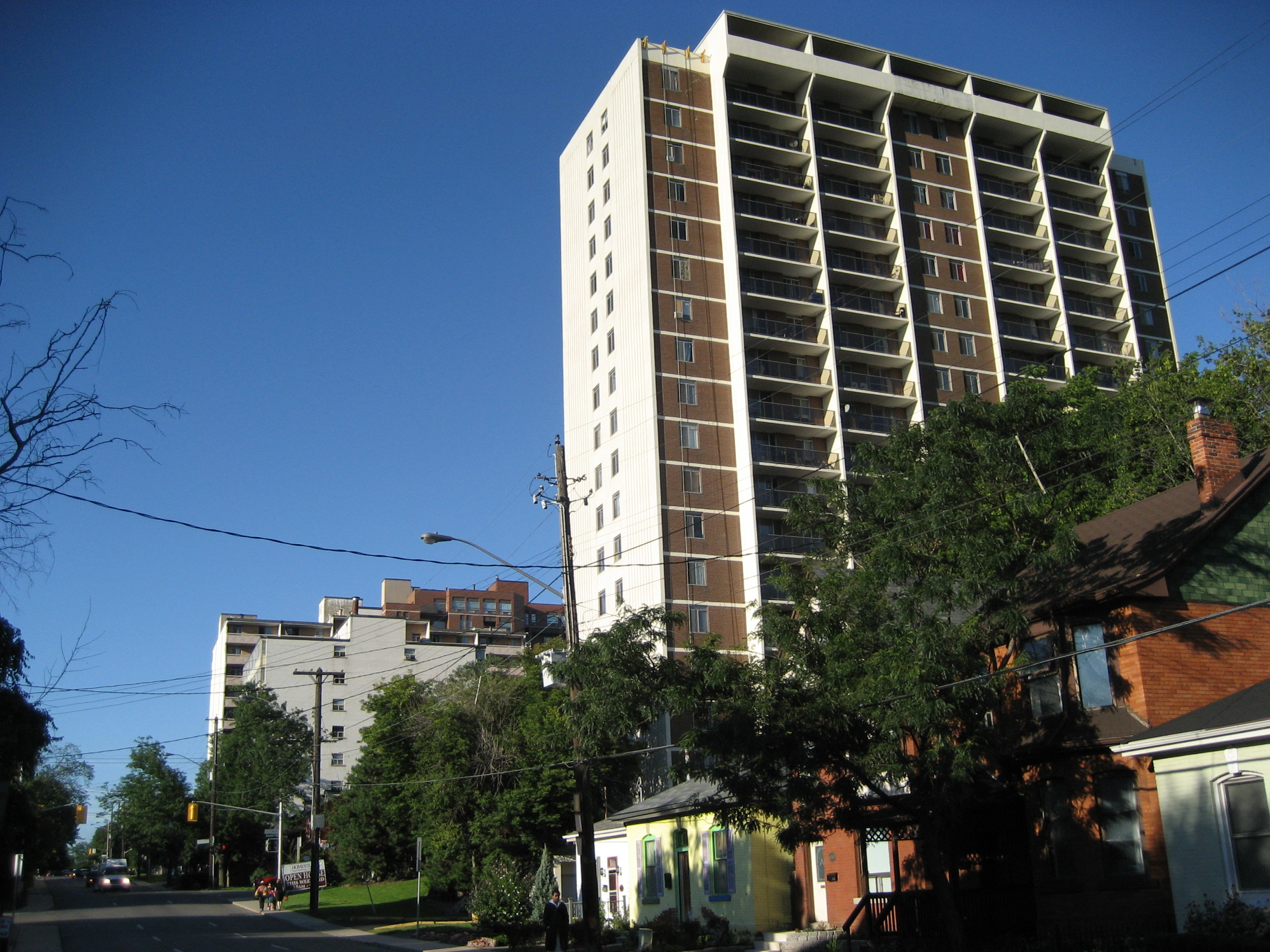
Capital Terrace Apartments

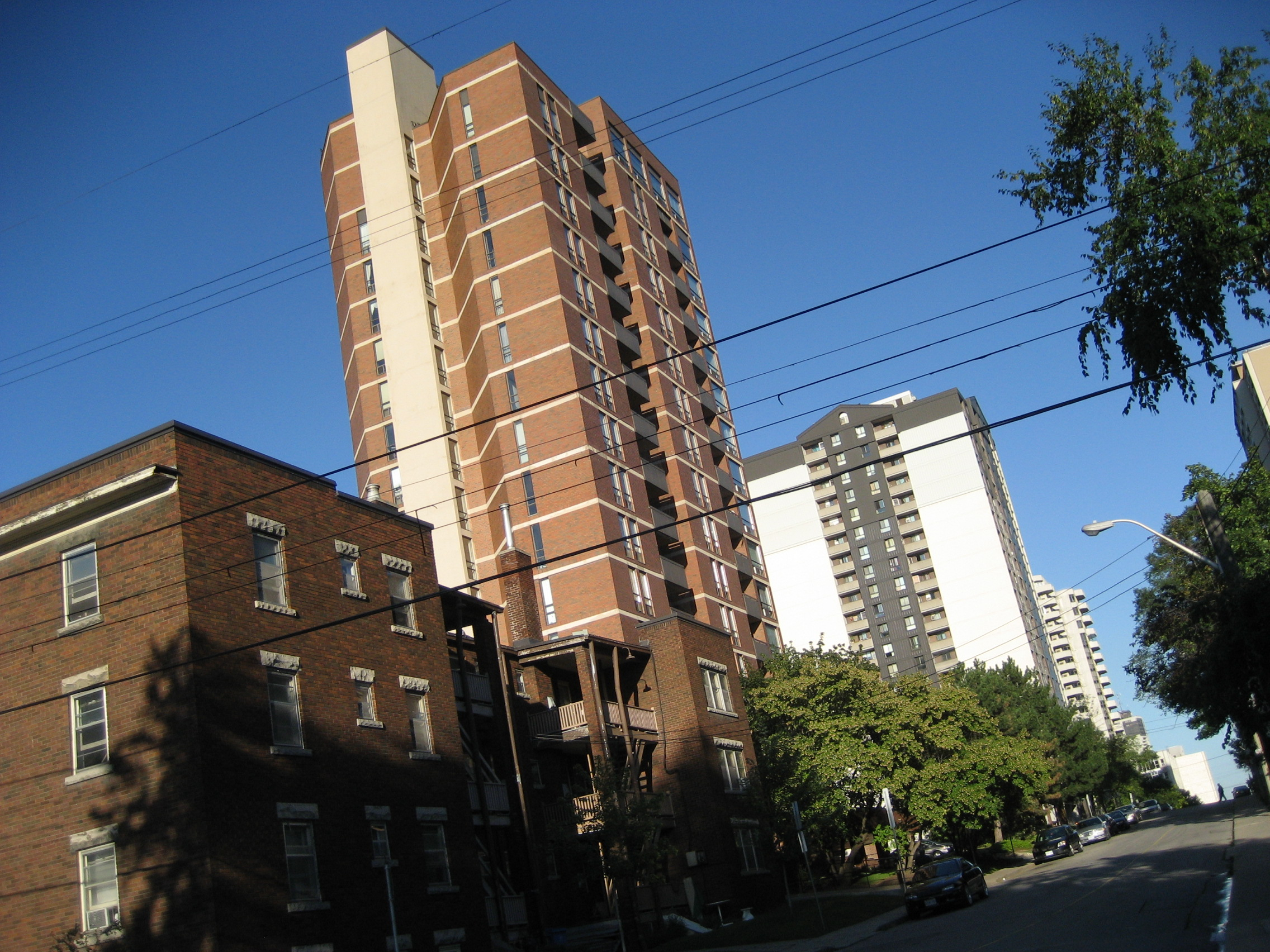
Corner of Queen & Jackson Streets

== See also ==
- Niagara Escarpment Commission
- Royal eponyms in Canada
