= Strathcona, Hamilton =

Neighbourhood in Hamilton, Ontario

Coordinates: 43.26789°N 79.88357°W

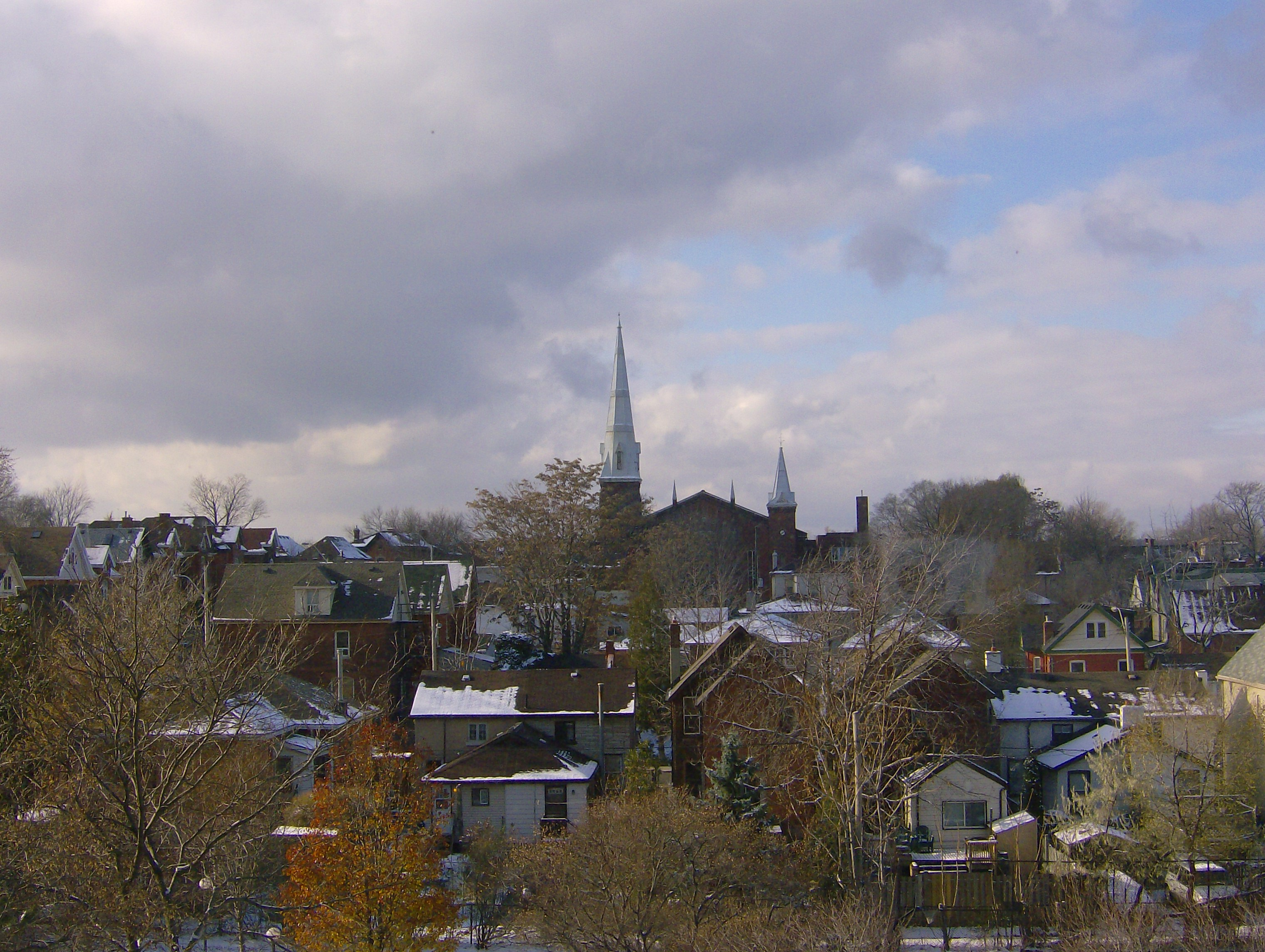
Strathcona neighbourhood

The Strathcona neighbourhood is located west of downtown Hamilton, Ontario, and is bounded by Highway 403, the CNR rail line, Queen Street, York Boulevard and Main Street. The neighbourhood is also intersected by several other major street arteries: Dundurn Street, Locke Street, and King Street West. As of the 2016 census, Strathcona has a population of 6,555, up from 5,800 in the 1996 census.

Victoria Park, at the corners of Locke and King, is a central feature in this largely residential neighbourhood.

Dundurn Park, on the north edge of the neighbourhood, is located at the junction of York Boulevard and Dundurn Street.

== History ==
The city of Hamilton was founded by George Hamilton, a War of 1812 veteran, merchant, and local politician, in 1815/16. The public square of the village was Gore Park at the corner of James and King Streets, just a few blocks east of what would become Strathcona neighbourhood. Hamilton received its city charter in 1846.

The Crystal Palace opened at Victoria Park 20 September 1860 by Edward, Prince of Wales (who later became King Edward VII). It was home to the area's largest fall fair (agriculture exhibition) for many years. The local Hamilton Herald newspaper was quoted as saying on 22 September 1890, "The Carnival of Venice, the Paris Exposition or the World's Fair in Chicago will be nowhere tomorrow when the great Central Fair is opened at the Crystal Palace Grounds in this city." The structure was demolished in 1891.

== Landmarks ==
Significant architectural landmarks in the neighbourhood include Dundurn Castle (1835), Castle Dean (1830s), Erskine Presbyterian Church (1880), Zion United Church (1874), Queen 75, Our Lady of Mercy Church, Cathedral Basilica of Christ the King (1933), former St George's Anglican Church (1890) Strathcona School (1985), Tuckett Mansion-Scottish Rite (1896), and Staircase Cafe Theatre. Many homes in this community were built in the late 19th century.

Dundurn Castle was built between 1832 and 1835 for Sir Allan Napier MacNab and named after his family ancestral seat in Scotland. Incorporating an existing farmhouse, it was designed by local architect Robert Wetherell as a statement of its owner's place in society. The house features classical and Italian motifs, French windows, broad verandahs, and a panoramic view of Burlington Bay. With its outbuildings and grounds, Dundurn Castle stands as an important example of the Picturesque Movement of Canada. After years in private hands, the property was purchased by the city and from 1964 to 1967 was restored to its former splendour.

Tuckett Mansion-Scottish Rite. Tuckett Tobacco Company was started by George Elias Tuckett (1835-1900), who in 1896 was Hamilton's 27th mayor. Tuckett's home, now the Scottish Rite Castle, at Queen Street and King Street W, is one of Hamilton's most magnificent structures.

Strathcona School is a small school with two very distinct programs. The area students come to Strathcona and make up the "Main" program, while the Hamilton-Wentworth District School Board's first program of Choice called "S.A.G.E.", which stands for Scholastics, Arts and Global Education, is also located at Strathcona. The school operates these programs separately, while at the same time the students take part in some school-based activities together like Peace Culture and extracurricular activities.
