= All Saints Church (Hamilton, Ontario) =

Coordinates: 43°15′33″N 79°52′46″W

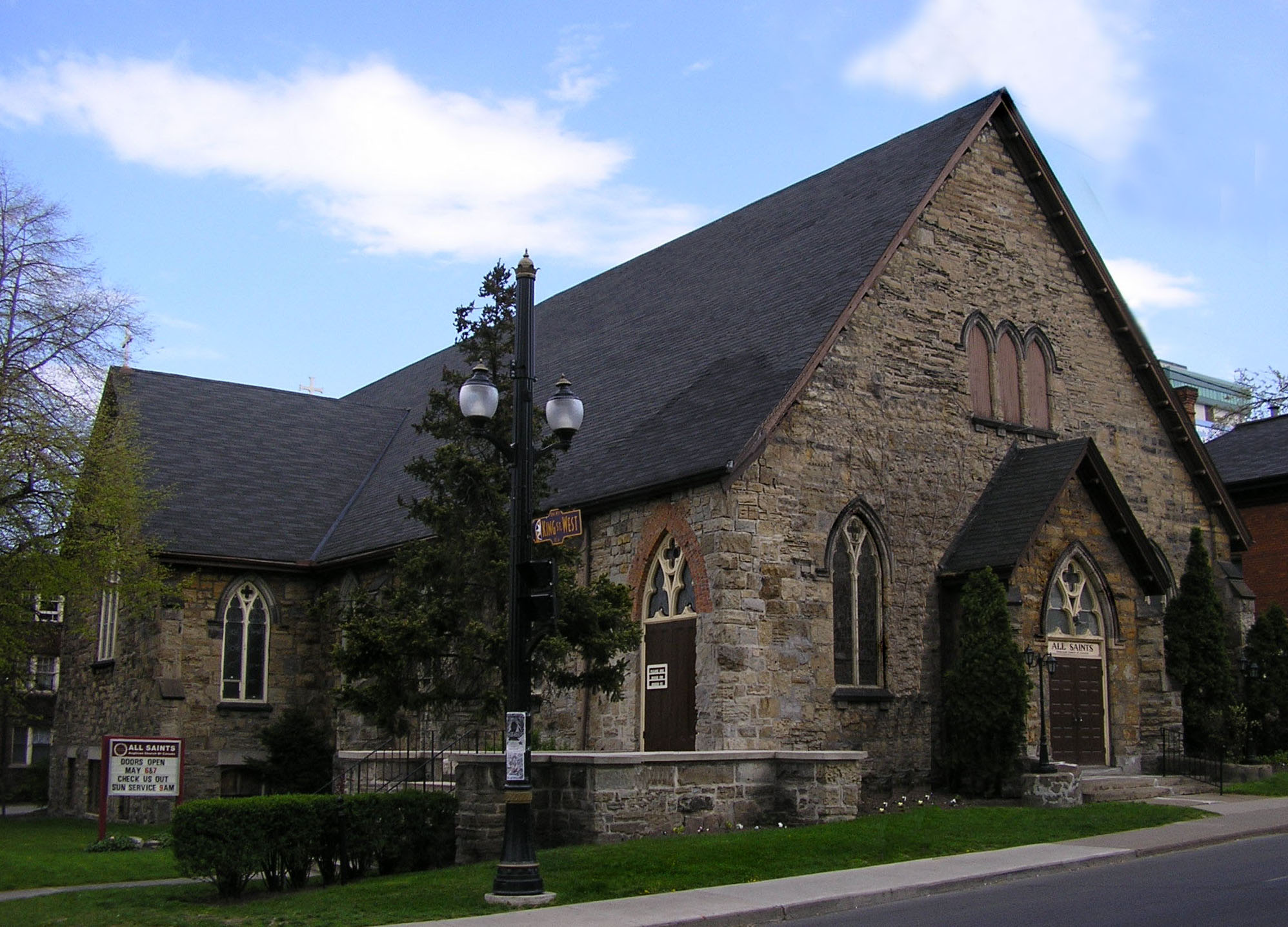
- All Saints Church, Hamilton, Ontario, Canada
- All Saints Church
- Denomination: Anglican Church of Canada
- Website: http://www.vansondesign.com/allsaints/ Official site

History
- Dedication: All Saints

Administration
- Province: Canada
- Diocese: Niagara
- Parish: Ontario

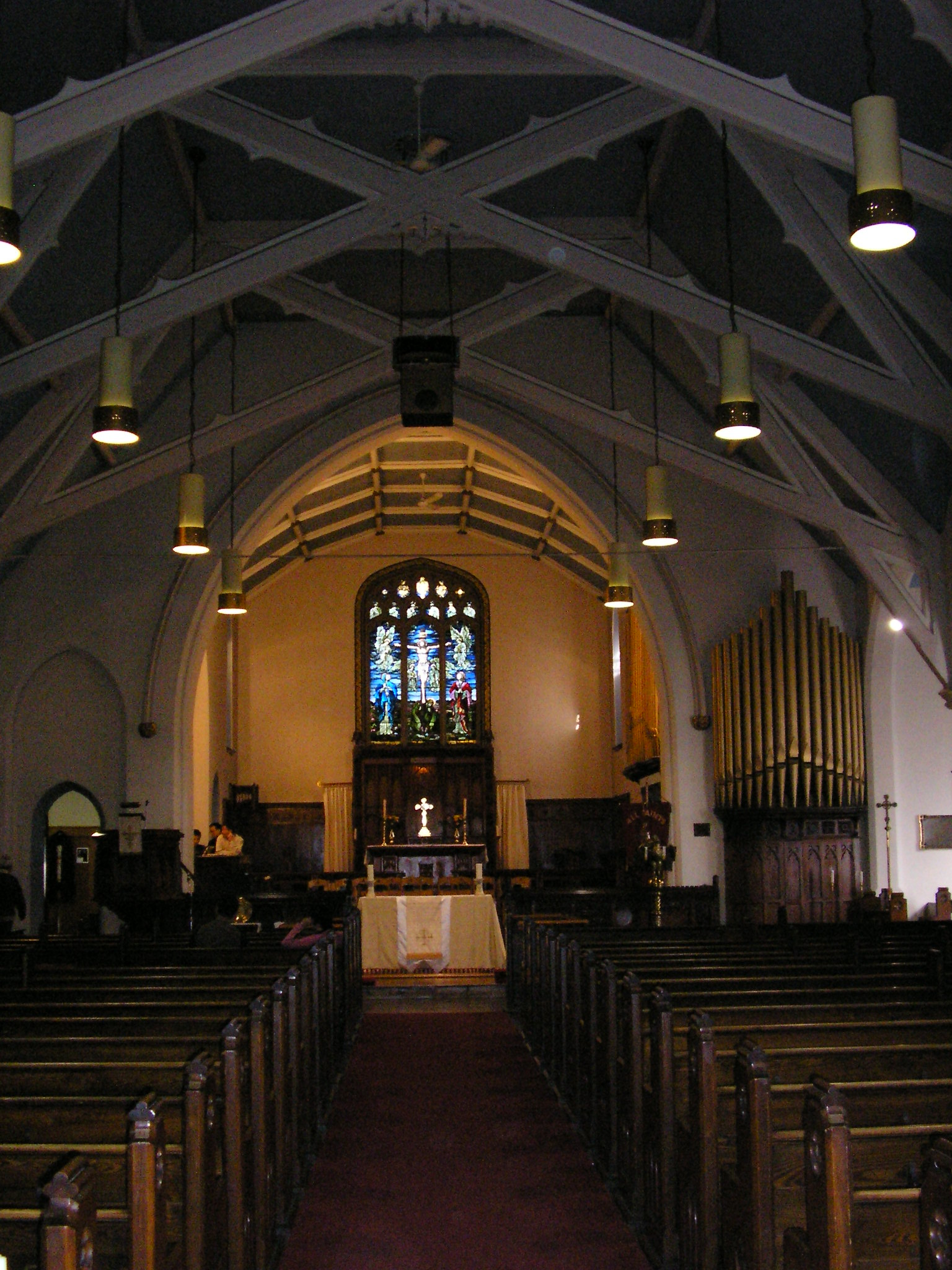
Interior of All Saints Church, Hamilton, Ontario

All Saints Church, was located in Hamilton, Ontario, on Queen Street South at King Street West.

== History ==
The establishment of the church parish dates to 1855, while the construction of the building began in 1872.

This building originally had a large tower. On September 24, 1998, a 5.4 earthquake hit Hamilton at 3:52 p.m. The support stones for the tower were damaged, and forced the removal of the stone spire.

In the fall of 2009 the church was declared unsafe and was closed due to further instability of the structure - pieces of the roof were falling into the nave. The congregation moved to worship in a senior's facility, and then another local church.

The historic stone building was demolished on August 25, 2016, to make way for a new condominium with plans for a worship space for the congregation included.
