= King Street, Hamilton, Ontario =

Road in Hamilton, Ontario, Canada

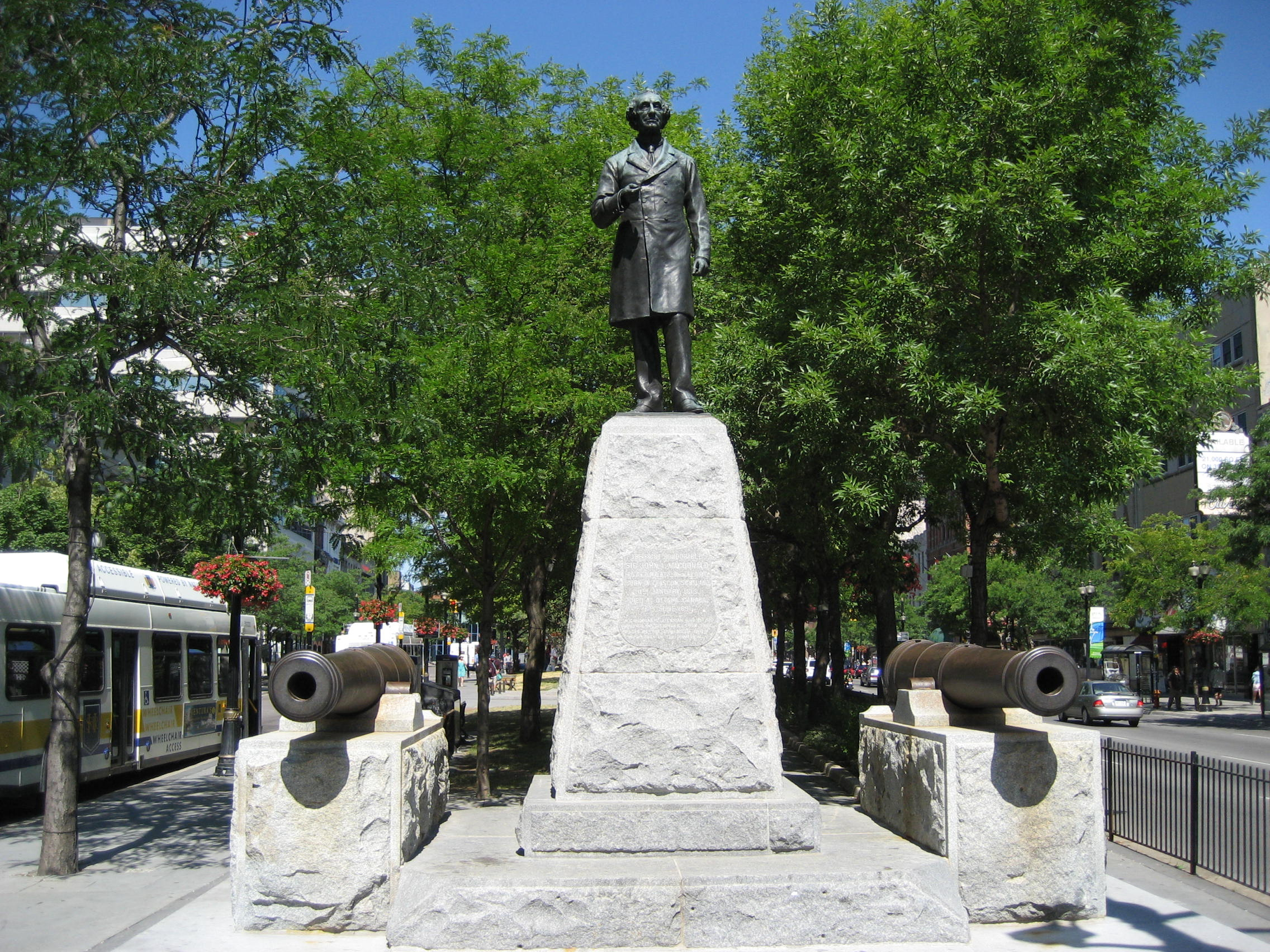
Sir John A. Macdonald statue, Gore Park

King Street is a Lower City arterial road in Hamilton, Ontario, Canada, also known as Highway 8. The street begins in the west beside McMaster University Medical Centre as a two-way street and passes through Westdale. At Paradise Road, King Street becomes to a one-way street (westbound) through the city's core up to "the Delta", at the intersection of King Street and Main Street, where it begins to run south of Main. From the Delta onwards, King Street becomes a two-way street again and ends at Highway 8 in Stoney Creek.

There is another King Street in Hamilton, which runs through the Dundas community, originally an independent town prior to being amalgamated with Hamilton in 2001.

== History ==
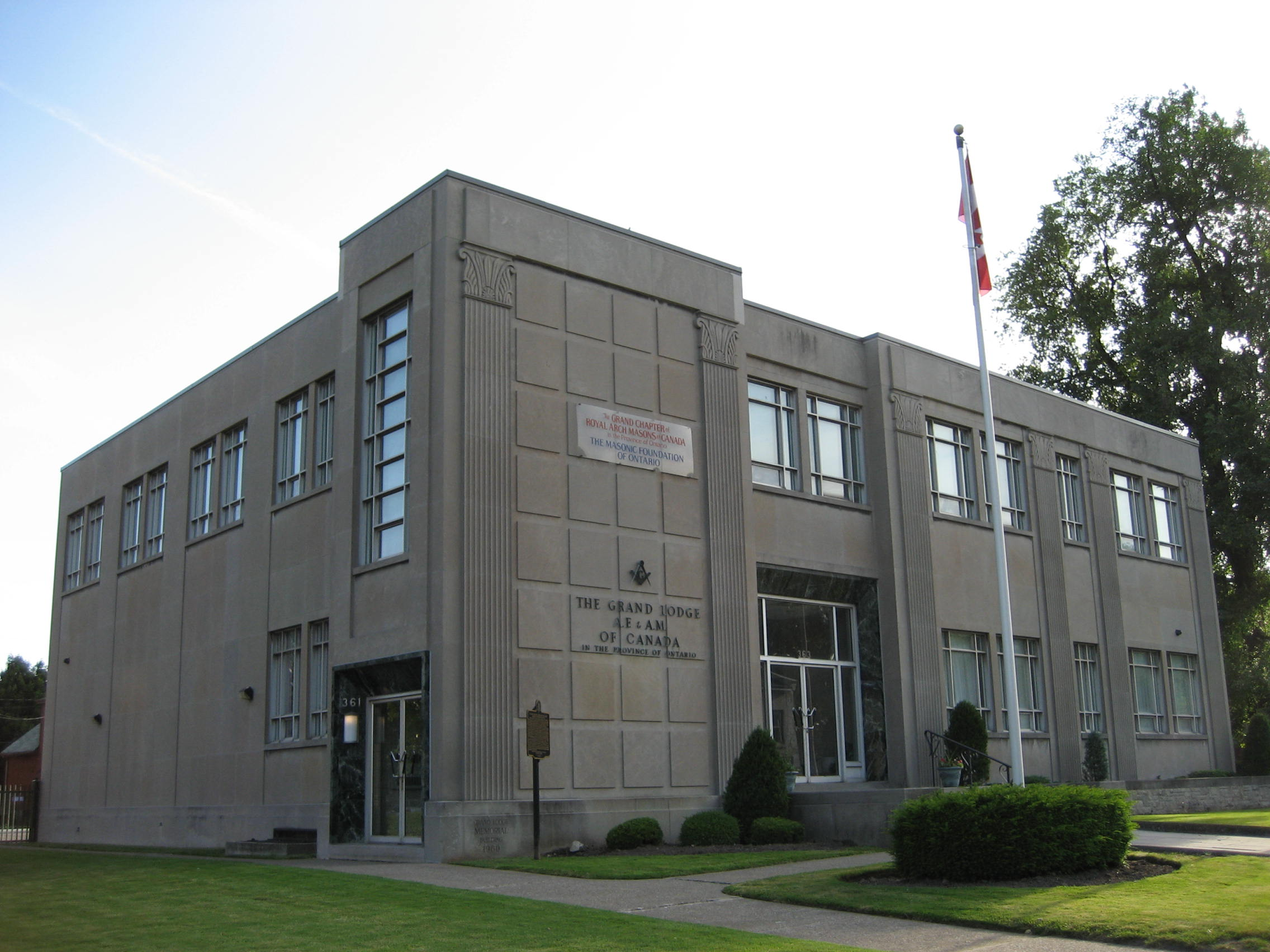
Grand Lodge of Canada

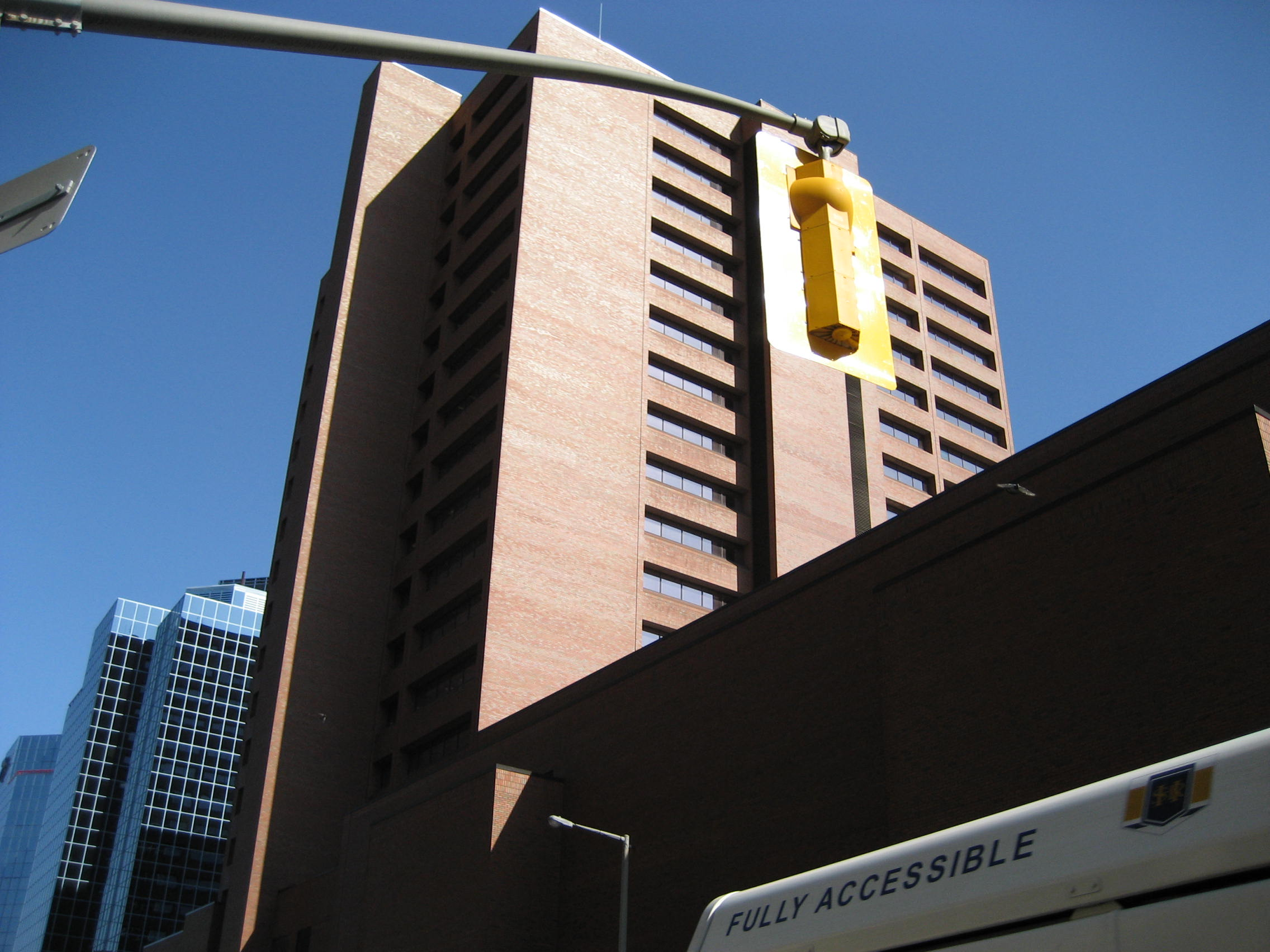
Ellen Fairclough Building/ Hamilton Convention Centre

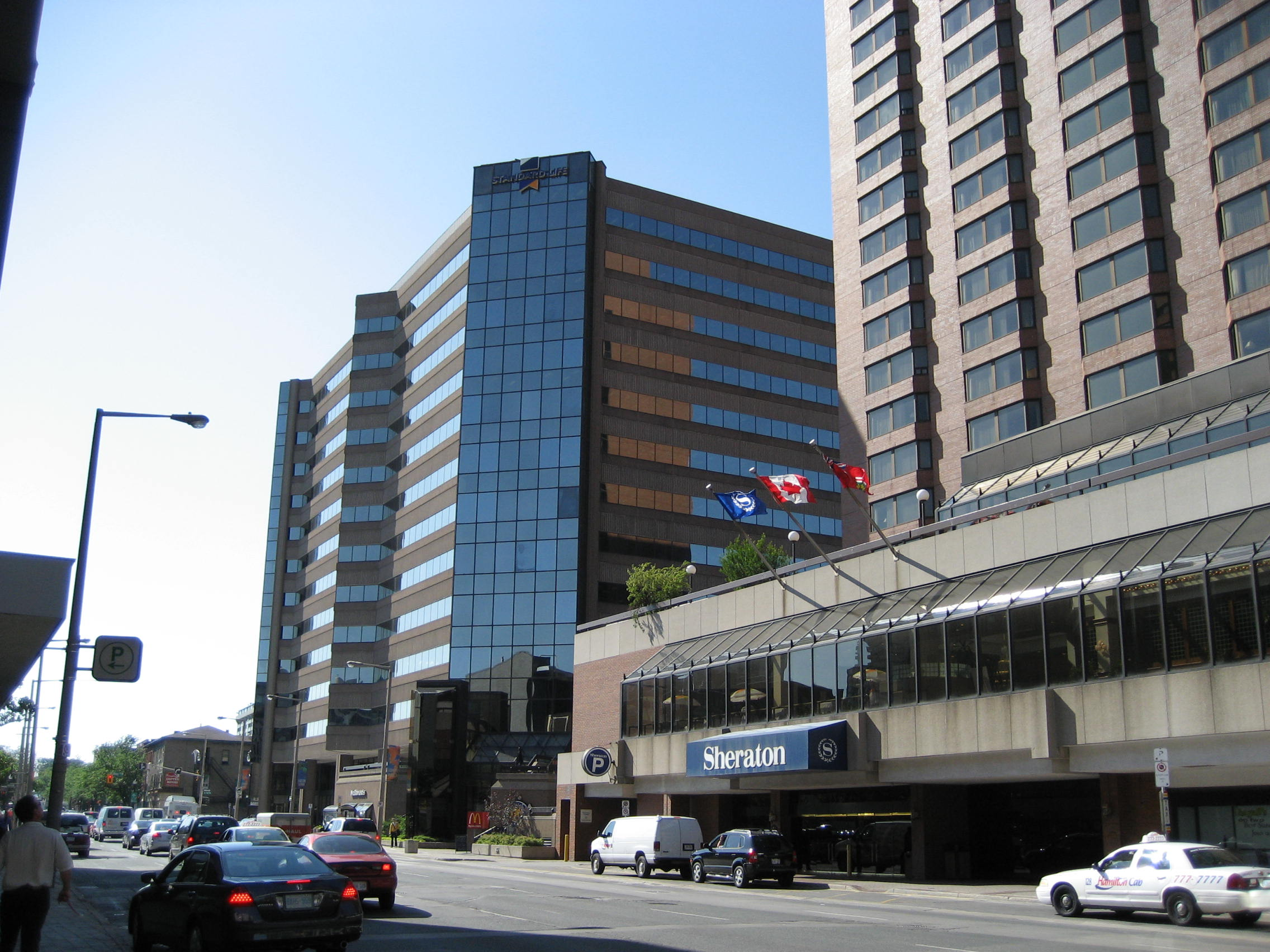
120 King Street West & Sheraton Hamilton

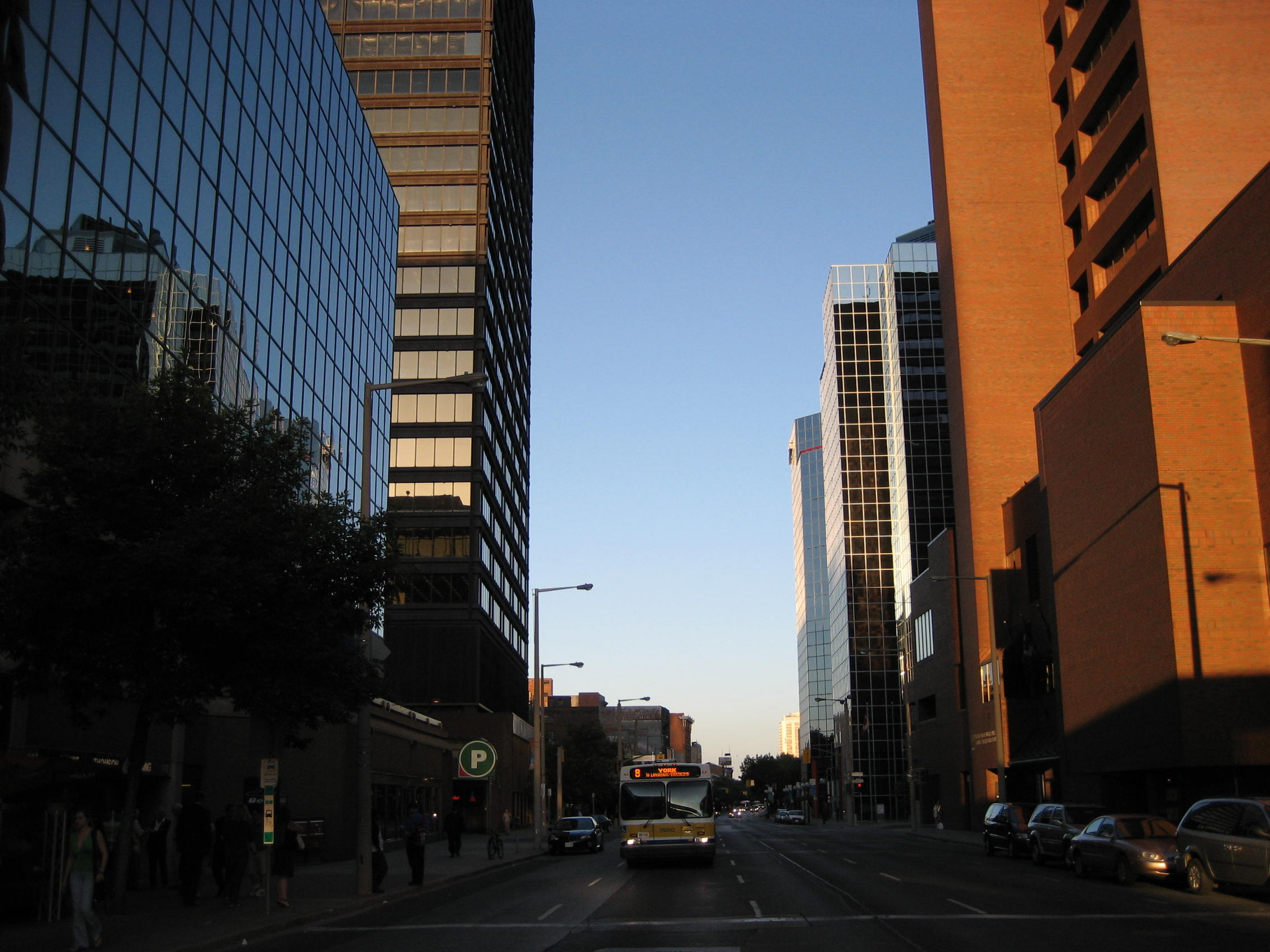
King Street West, looking East

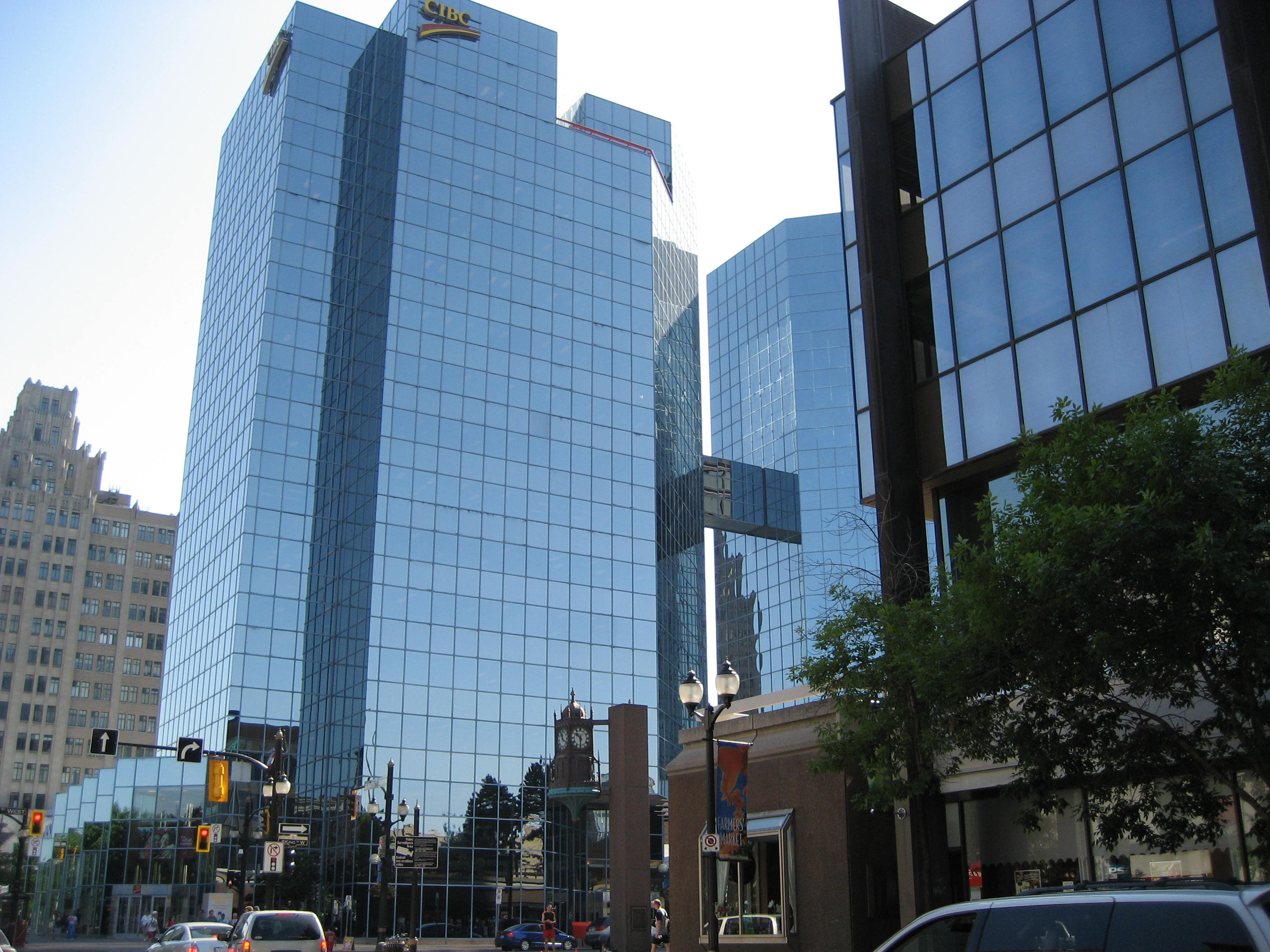
Commerce Place Complex

King Street follows the path of an old native trail; it was named for King George III.

In 1815, George Hamilton, a settler and local politician, established a town site in the northern portion of the Barton Township. He kept several east-west roads which were originally Indian trails, but the north-south streets were on a regular grid pattern. Streets were designated "East" or "West" if they crossed James Street or Highway 6. Streets were designated "North" or "South" if they crossed King Street or Highway 8.

=== Gore Park ===
Gore Park is located along two sections of King Street East from John Street and James Street.

In 1860, Edward, Prince of Wales (who later became King Edward VII) was in Hamilton to open up Gore Park (town centre) and the Crystal Palace. The Crystal Palace saw various Agricultural Exhibitions. It was modeled on the famous Crystal Palace designed and built in London, England. By 1891 the structure was in bad condition and decision was made to demolish it. All traces disappeared from the site, which is now known as Victoria Park.

In 1893, The Right House opened on the corner of King Street and Hughson Street. It was Hamilton's first large department store.

On 30 October 1893, The Sir John A. Macdonald Statue arrived in Hamilton from London, England. Official dedication of the statue took place 1 November 1893, located at the intersection of King Street and Hughson Street. Prime Minister Sir John Thompson was in attendance. On 20 June 2021, the statue was covered in fabric following protests from Indigenous community members. The fabric was removed by the city three days later. By the end of June the statue had been painted red, similarly to an incident in 2020. The statue was toppled during a protest rally on 14 August 2021 after city council voted not to remove the statue. The statue has remained in storage as the city conducts a review of its historical landmarks. Signage regarding the problematic nature of the monument has been placed at the former site.

=== Hamilton Cenotaph ===
The Cenotaph at Veteran's Place at Gore Park was unveiled on May 22, 1923 by Governor General Viscount Byng, who led Canadians into France and Flanders. The Cenotaph commemorates the 53,000 Canadian soldiers, 2,000 of them Hamiltonians, who were killed during the first World War. Hamilton's Cenotaph is a replica of the British Cenotaph in Westminster, London by Edwin Lutyens and Hamilton one was designed by William Russell Souter (1894–1971), a Hamilton architect, and World War I veteran. It consists of a huge granite column with an image of a casket at its summit. Two smaller columns are at its side with carved replicas of the equipment used by Canadian troops in the First World War.

=== The Palace Theatre ===
The Pantages Theatre opened up in 1921 on King Street, (between Catharine Street and Mary Street), with a seating capacity of 3,500 made it the largest theatre in Canada at the time. In 1930 it was renamed The Palace Theatre. It closed in 1972.

Hamilton was at one time was home to many Grand Theatres, all of which are no longer in existence. These include, Grand Opera House (James Street North), Savoy Theatre (Merrick Street), Temple Theatre (behind the Terminal Building on King Street), Lyric Theatre (Mary Street) and The Loews Theatre, later renamed to The Capitol (King Street East).

=== The Delta ===
On 11 June 1925, the first traffic lights in Canada went into operation at the Delta.

=== McMaster University ===
McMaster University moved to Hamilton, Ontario from Toronto in 1930, thanks to the efforts of Thomas McQuesten. Its hospital sits at the western end of King Street.

=== Christ the King Cathedral ===
Christ the King Cathedral, is a Roman Catholic church in Hamilton, Ontario Canada. The Cathedral was consecrated on December 19, 1933. The cathedral is perched atop a hill overlooking Highway 403 leading in towards the rest of Hamilton and one travelling towards Oakville, Mississauga and Toronto.

=== 434 King Street West ===
The Kenmore Theatre opened in 1924, showcasing moving pictures.

CHCH-TV 11 began broadcasting in 1954 as a CBC affiliate, taking over the theatre, with a transmitter located at 481 First Road West in Stoney Creek. At the time, all private stations were required to be CBC affiliates. Then in 1961, CHCH disaffiliated from the CBC and became an independent TV station. The old studio building on King Street West reverted to a theatre before being shuttered in 2017. Plans to redevelop the theatre with residential units above failed to materialize after a court order sale in 2022.

As of August 2026, affordable housing charity Indwell plans to redevelop the property with commercial space and 50 apartment units.

=== Terminal Towers ===
In 1966, Terminal Towers including a new eight-storey Holiday Inn opened on the site of the old transit terminal between King and Main at Catharine Street. It's now called Effort Square and the hotel is a Crowne Plaza. Effort Square is also the home of the Lincoln Alexander Centre.

== Architecture ==
Phase 1 of Lloyd D. Jackson Square (mall) was completed, including 100 King Street West (Stelco Tower) and 1 James Street North (Bank of Montreal Pavilion) in 1972. Then in 1977, the second phase of Jackson Square was completed along with a 9 storey office building called the Robert Thomson Building, but not the department store intended to be its major attraction. Also in 1977, The Art Gallery of Hamilton opened beside the Board of Education building. In 1981, The Hamilton Convention Centre and the government office tower above it opened. The tower was named the Ellen Fairclough Building one year later in 1982. In 1983, 120 King Street West (Standard Life Centre) opened at the west end of Jackson Square. In 1985, Sheraton Hamilton, connected to Jackson Square, opened, boosting downtown Hamilton's hotel space.

In 1985, TD Coliseum (formerly Copps Coliseum, FirstOntario Centre, and Hamilton Arena), a sports and entertainment arena with a capacity of up to 19,000 (depending on event type and configuration) opened its doors for business (one block North of King Street at Bay Street), with the hope of attracting NHL attention at the city for a possible expansion team, which did not happen. It was named after the former Hamilton mayor, Victor K. Copps.

In 1987, the first of two reflective twim glass buildings of the CIBC tower (Commerce Place I) opened at King and James opposite Gore Park. The other (Commerce Place II) opened in 1990, three years later.

== Culture ==
Hamilton has hosted several cultural and craft fairs since the 1960s, notably Festival of Friends, which made it a major tourist destination. The Festival of Friends, founded in 1975, is the largest annual free music event in the country. Burton Cummings, Lighthouse and Bruce Cockburn have been among the main stage headliners at Gage Park on Gage Avenue. WestJet is a major sponsor of the festival. Hamilton is also home to the Mustard Festival because Hamilton is home to the largest miller of dry mustard in the world. It's held annually at Ferguson Station, Ferguson Avenue and King Street East at Hamilton's International Village and is another summertime food & beverage festival that features some of the top Blues and Jazz acts in the region.

In 2001, the Steven Seagal film Exit Wounds used the streets of Downtown Hamilton for a period of 6-weeks during a night shoot of the movie's climatic chase scene that features the Gore Park water fountain and the Hamilton GO Transit station, Original site of the Toronto, Hamilton and Buffalo Railway (1892–1987).

=== Waterfront Shuttle ===
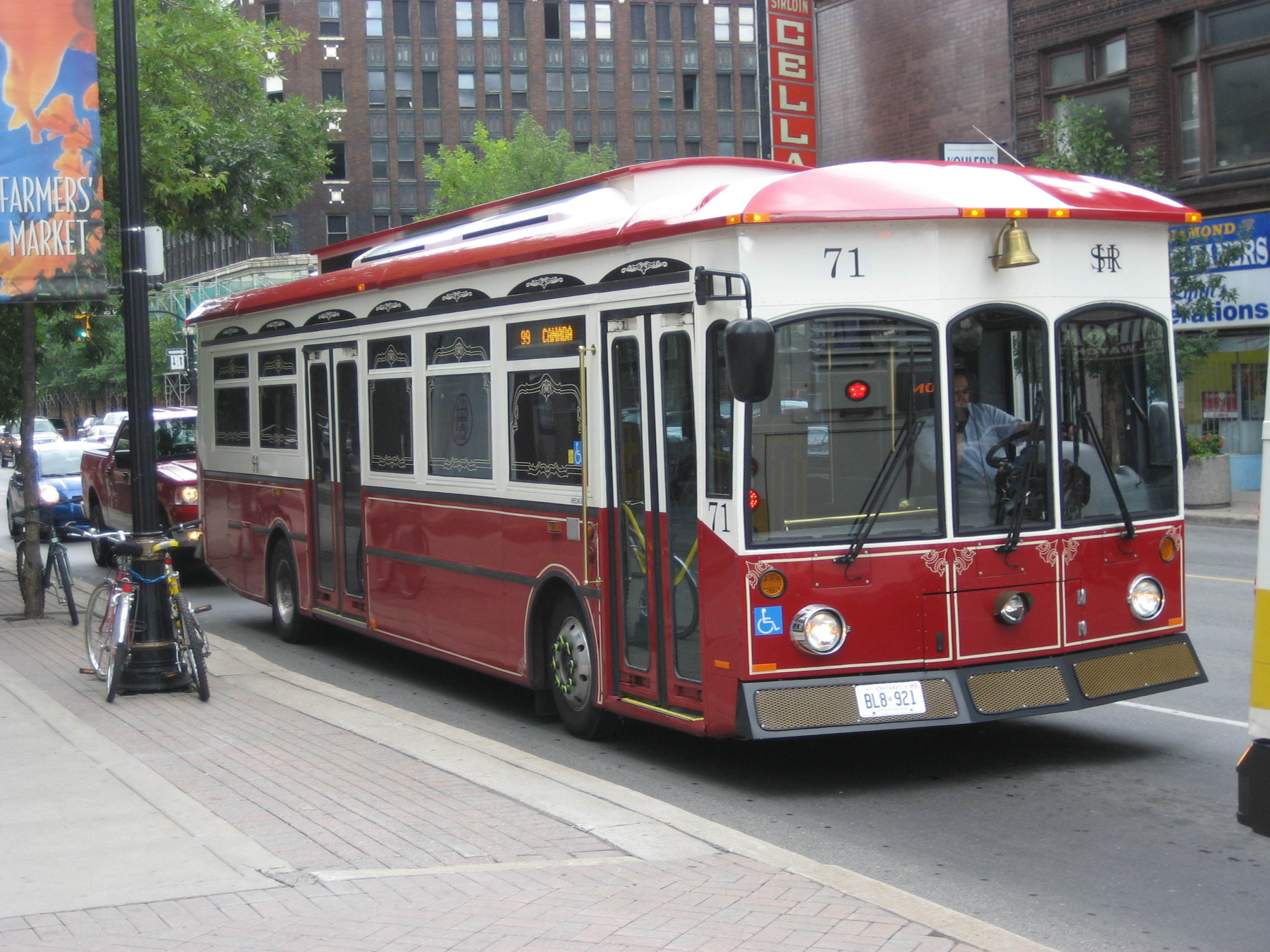
Route 99 - Waterfront Shuttle (seasonal)

The Waterfront Shuttle is a free service offered by the Hamilton Street Railway. It has a seasonal schedule that runs weekends from May-to-October connecting Hamilton's downtown core to the waterfront and attractions that can be found there like HMCS Haida and the Parks Canada Discovery Centre. The route circles Hamilton's downtown core around York Boulevard (north), Bay Street South (west), King Street West (south) and James Street North (east). Then it travels north along James Street and the Art District until it reaches the waterfront at Guise Street past the Royal Hamilton Yacht Club, Hamilton Chamber of Commerce and the Harbour West Marina Complex. Then the route hangs a left on Discovery Drive, the site of the Parks Canada Discovery Centre. Also at this site is the Hamilton Harbour Queen (cruise boat), Hamiltonian (tour boat) and the Hamilton Waterfront Trolley.

== Major intersections ==
Note: Listing of streets from West to East.

- Longwood Road, South
- Chedoke Parkway, (Freeway passes underneath the King Street West bridge)
- Dundurn Street, North, South
- Locke Street, North, South
- Queen Street, North, South
- Hess Street, North, South
- Bay Street, North, South
- MacNab Street, North, South
- James Street, North, South
- Hughson Street, North, South
- John Street, North, South
- Catharine Street, North, South
- Ferguson Avenue, North, South
- Wellington Street, North, South
- Victoria Avenue, North, South
- Wentworth Street, North, South
- Sherman Avenue, North, South
- Gage Avenue, North, South
- Ottawa Street, South
- Kenilworth Avenue, South
- Parkdale Avenue, South
- Red Hill Valley Parkway (Freeway passes underneath the King Street East bridge)
- Nash Road, South
- Centennial Parkway, South
- Lake Avenue Drive
- Gray Road
- Green Road

== See also ==
- Royal eponyms in Canada
