= George Elias Tuckett =

19th-century Canadian mayor

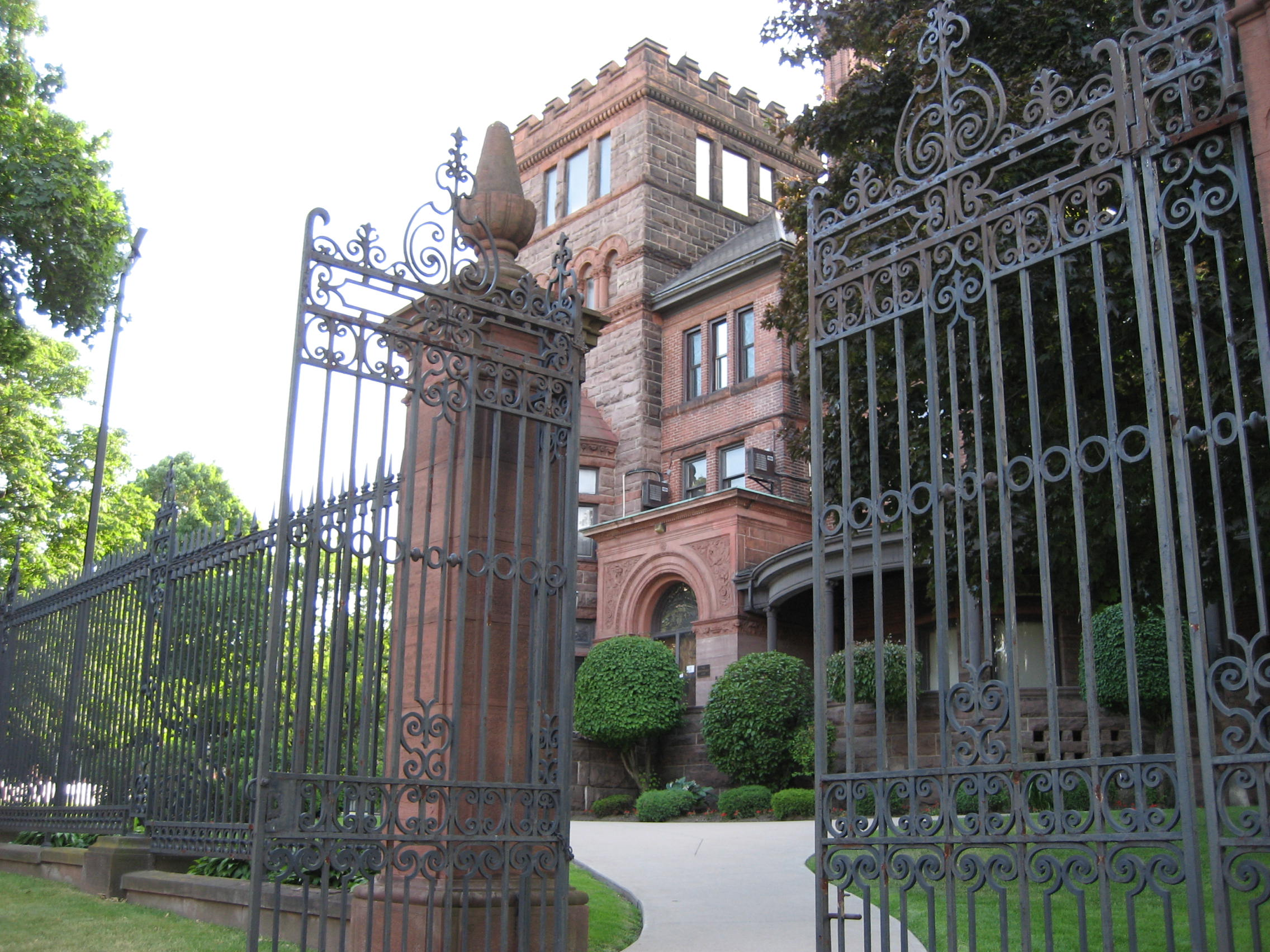
Scottish Rite Castle/ Masonic Centre, onetime home of George Elias Tuckett, Hamilton's 27th Mayor

George Elias Tuckett (December 4, 1835, Exeter, England - February 19, 1900) was mayor of Hamilton, Ontario in 1896.

Tuckett built a fortune during the American Civil War, cornering a chunk of the tobacco market. He also founded the Tuckett Tobacco Company in 1857. It was acquired by Imperial Tobacco in 1930.

He is buried in the Tuckett family crypt, located in Hamilton Cemetery.

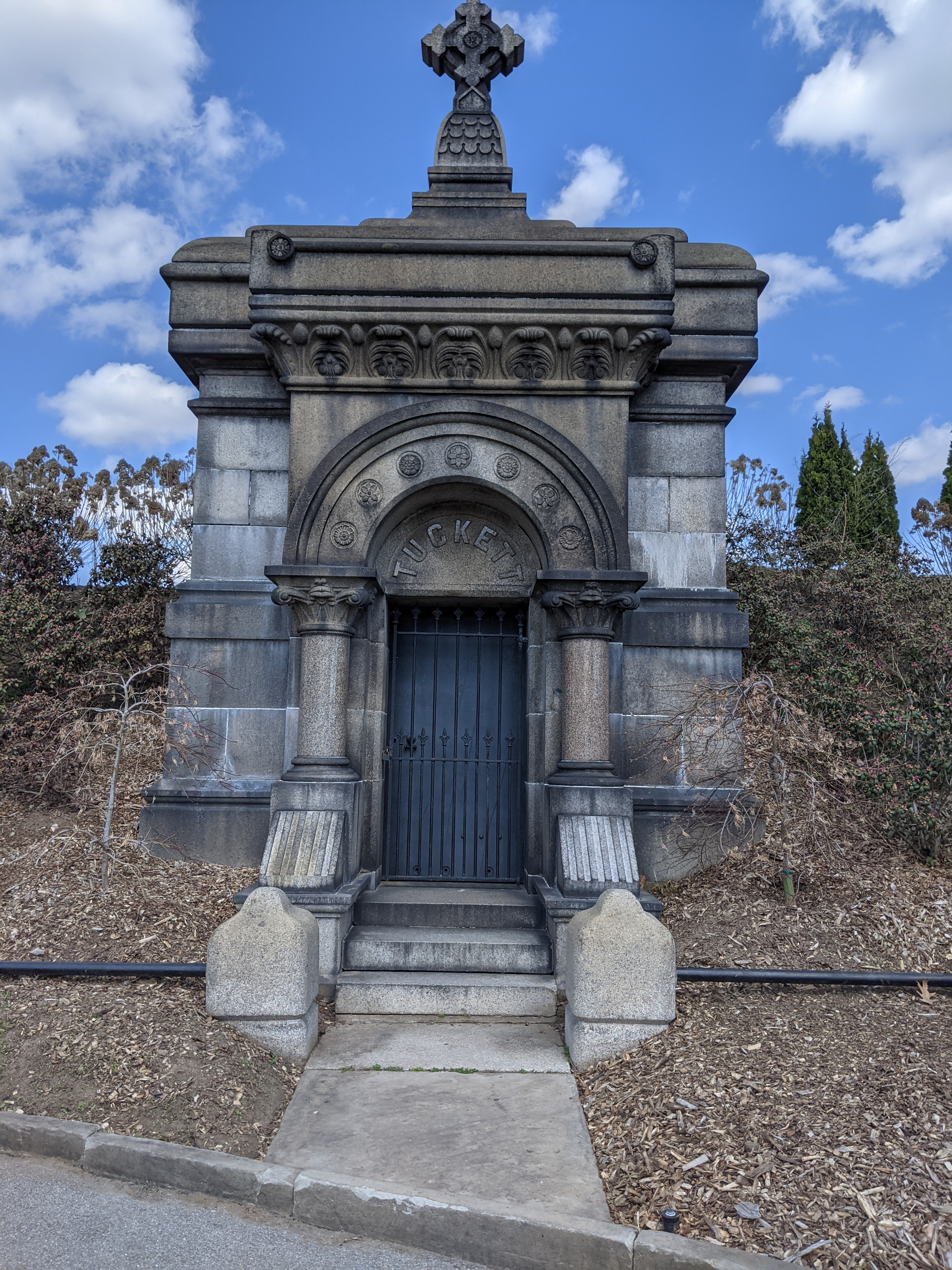
Resting place of George Elias Tuckett.

In 2005, a Bursary, The George Elias Tuckett Bursaries was established in his memory.
