= History of Hamilton, Ontario =

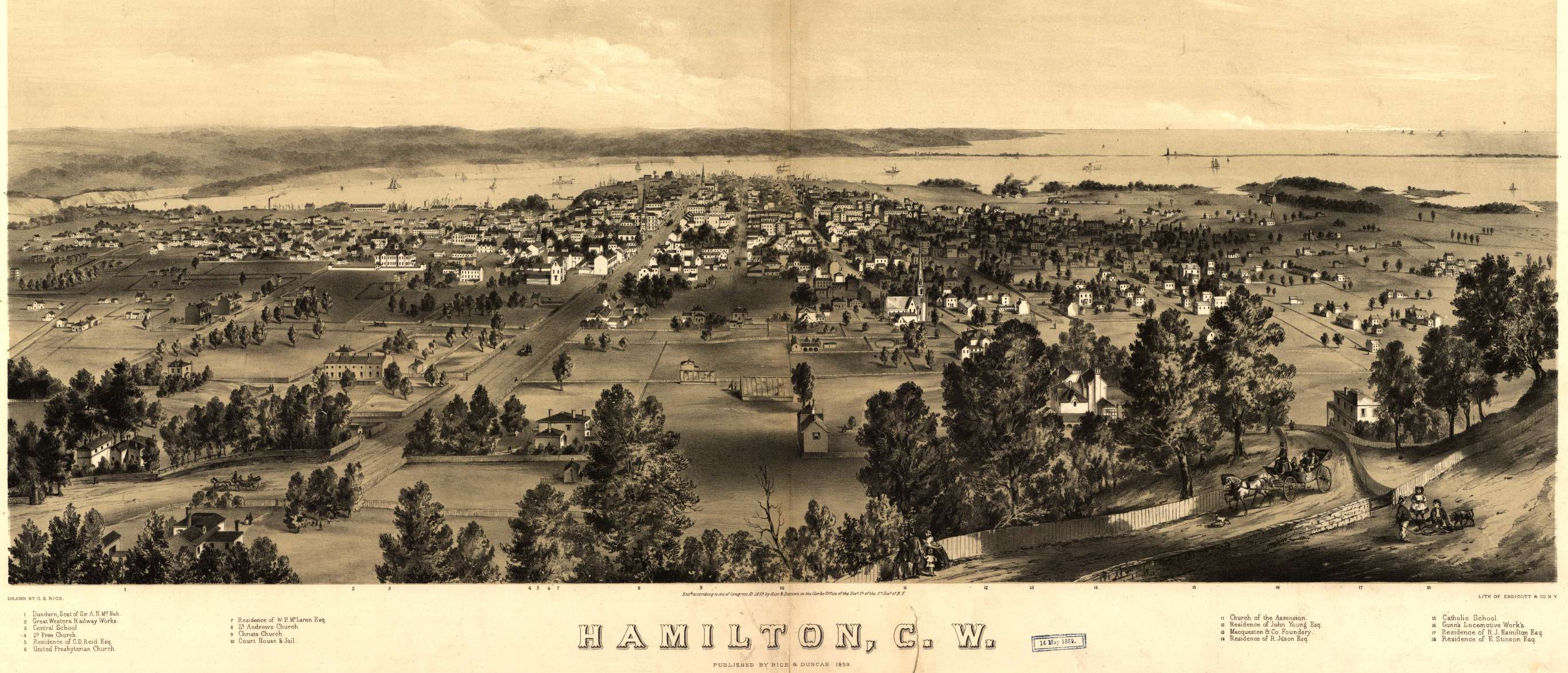
Depiction of Hamilton in 1859.

Prior to colonization, Hamilton was occupied by the Chonnonton, or Attiwandaronk, an Iroquoian-speaking nation referred to by French explorers as the "Neutral" people. Since then, there have been successive waves of immigration.

Hamilton, from the point at which it was first colonized by settlers, has benefited from its geographical proximity to major land and water transportation routes along the Niagara Peninsula and Lake Ontario. Its strategic importance has created a rich military history which the city preserves.

Tension between maximizing economic growth and minimizing environmental damage was evident, even from the city's early development. The area between Burlington Bay (also known as Hamilton Harbour) and the Niagara Escarpment has been greatly altered for residential, industrial and recreational purposes. Cootes Paradise in Dundas also known as the Dundas Marsh, was a very rich wetland with plenty of fish, birds and other game. Cootes Paradise was named after Captain Thomas Coote, a British army officer of Irish extraction who was stationed in the area at the time of the American revolutionary war in the 18th century. The richness of the valley led to population, and to degradation of the marsh, although its legal protection, starting in the 1880s, and the efforts of civic officials and others, have led to it still being of great environmental importance in the 21st century.

For about a century after achieving its status as a city in 1846, Hamilton has seen itself in terms of industrial production. It adopted or acquired such nicknames as the Ambitious City, Steel City and the Birmingham of Canada. However, after this period, other sectors of the economy took over and Hamilton became a post-industrial economy but failed to change its image and self-image to match. Here then follows the growth of the Hamilton until the end of the Second World War.

== Pre-1811 ==
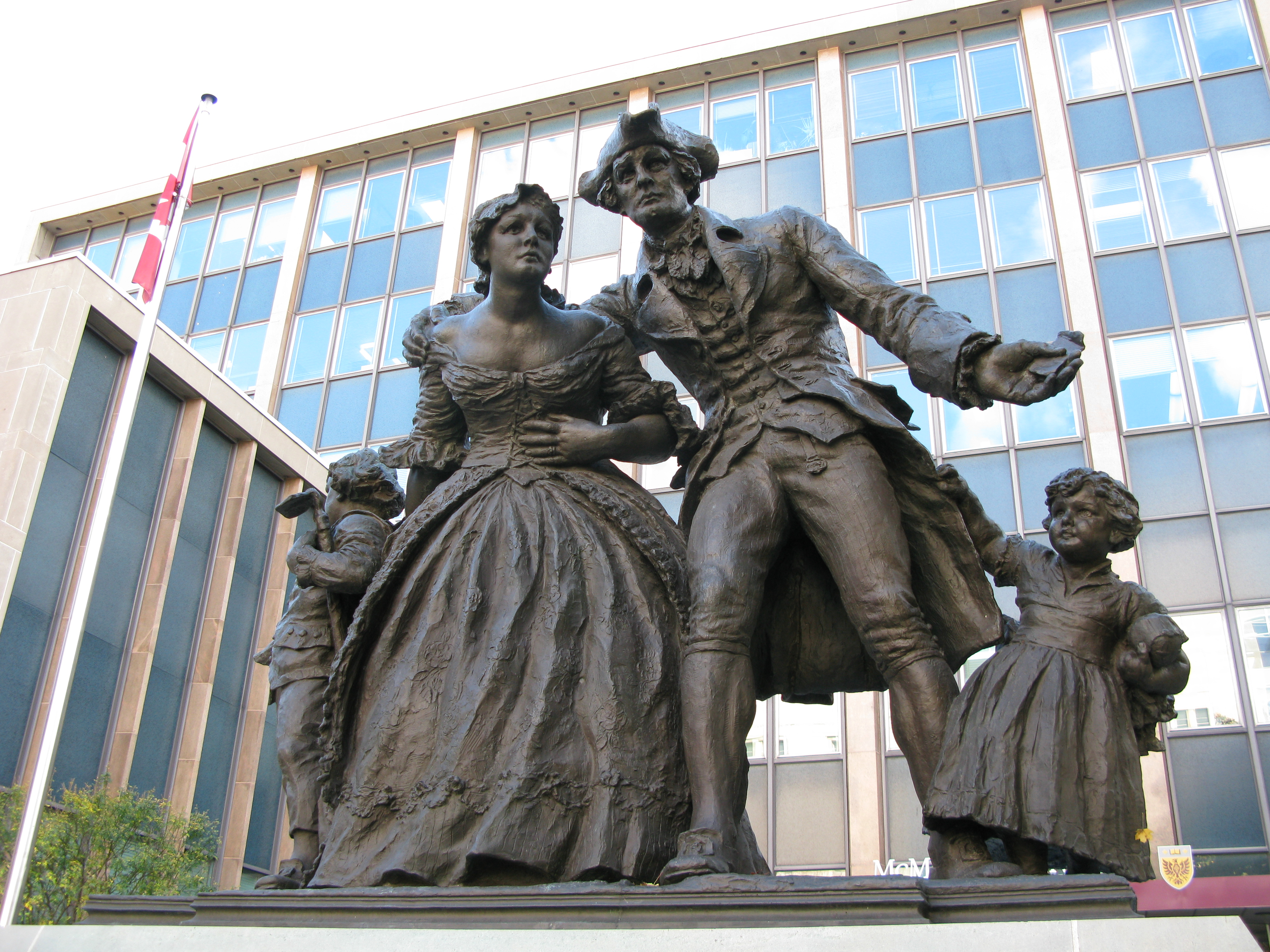
Statue commemorating the United Empire Loyalists in Downtown Hamilton. Loyalists fleeing from the American Revolutionary War were the first Europeans to settle the area.

Like most of the Americas, the original inhabitants of the Hamilton area were Native North American Aboriginal peoples. The first European to visit what is now Hamilton was probably Étienne Brûlé in 1616. Lasalle also visited the area, a fact commemorated at a park in nearby Burlington.

In pre-colonial times, the Neutral Nation occupied most of the land but were gradually driven out by the Haudenosaunee who were allied with British against the French and their Wendat allies. A member of the Haudenosaunee Confederacy provided both the route and name for Mohawk Road on Hamilton Mountain and the route for what would become King Street in the Lower City.

Like British North America itself, the Six Nations confederacy was torn apart by the American Revolution. Indigenous groups loyal to the Crown, under their leader Captain Joseph Brant, were settled in several nearby areas of what became Upper Canada in 1791 and ultimately Ontario in 1867. These included Brant’s Ford (now Brantford) on the Grand River in Brant County south of Hamilton, and Brant’s Block (now Burlington) in Halton County north of Hamilton.

The United Empire Loyalists moved into the Hamilton area during and after the American War of Independence as well, dramatically boosting the population and economic development of the region between the original Upper Canadian capital at Newark (now Niagara-on-the-Lake) and the new one at York (now Toronto). This was to prove crucial, for the fighting between the United States and Britain was not yet over.

Administratively, the whole area was part of the Nassau District, which was renamed the Home District in 1792. Additionally, parts of the area were separately incorporated into the West Riding of York County and First Riding of Lincoln County. In 1798, most of the future Hamilton became part of Niagara District while remaining in Lincoln County.

== 1812–1844 ==
The town of Hamilton was conceived by George Hamilton when he purchased the Durand farm shortly after the War of 1812. Nathaniel Hughson, a property owner to the north, cooperated with George Hamilton to prepare a proposal for a courthouse and jail on Hamilton's property. Hamilton offered the land to the crown for the future site. James Durand, the local Member of the British Legislative Assembly, was empowered by Hughson and Hamilton to sell property holdings which later became the site of the town. As he had been instructed, Durand circulated the offers at York during a session of the Legislative Assembly and a new Gore District was established of which the Hamilton town site was a member. As such, Hamilton's future seemed to be shaped by a private collaboration of Hamilton, Hughson and Durand.

Initially the Town of Hamilton was not the dominant center of the Gore District. A permanent jail was not constructed until 1832 when a cut-stone design was completed on one of the two squares created in 1816, Prince's Square. Subsequently, the first police board and the town limits were defined by statute on February 13 of 1833.

After simmering treaty and border disputes finally erupted into the War of 1812, the Hamilton area again became a strategic area. In 1813, the British regulars and Canadian militia defeated invading American troops at the Battle of Stoney Creek which was fought in what is now a park in eastern Hamilton. Burlington Heights, adjacent to the grounds of present-day Dundurn Park and Castle, was also a site commanding the entry to Burlington Bay.

George Hamilton, a settler and local politician, established a town site in the northern portion Barton Township after the war in 1815. He kept several east–west roads which were originally Indian trails, but the north–south streets were on a regular grid pattern. Streets were designated "East" or "West" if they crossed James Street or King’s Highway No. 6. Streets were designated "North" or "South" if they crossed King Street or King’s Highway No. 8.

Gore Park, whose western boundary is King and James Streets, formed the public square for the new settlement and has remained the centre of the city ever since. The original plot of land set aside for the courthouse has had four different buildings erected on it. It was only supplanted as the court site by a move across the street in the 1990s as part of an architectural preservation project for the Post Office and Dominion Public Building.

Gore District of Upper Canada and Wentworth County were created in 1816, with Mr. Hamilton’s settlement as the seat for both. The county’s original constituent townships included the following, the territory of which became part of the amalgamated Hamilton in 2001: Ancaster (later a town), Barton, Binbrook (later one half of Glanbrook), Glanford (later the other half of Glanbrook) and Saltfleet (later the town and city of Stoney Creek). Seneca and Brant Townships were also original constituents of the county but later became part of Haldimand County and Brant County, respectively.

During the first half of the 19th century, Mr. Hamilton’s settlement in Barton Township steadily increased status at the expense of Dundas. Growth was aided in 1810 by a channel cut to link Burlington Bay directly with Lake Ontario, thus improving its marine transportation. George Hamilton’s settlement was incorporated as a police village in 1833. In comparison, the Desjardins Canal to Dundas was at best an incomplete success. The physical structures, with living interpreters, of these pioneer days are preserved at Westfield Heritage Centre.

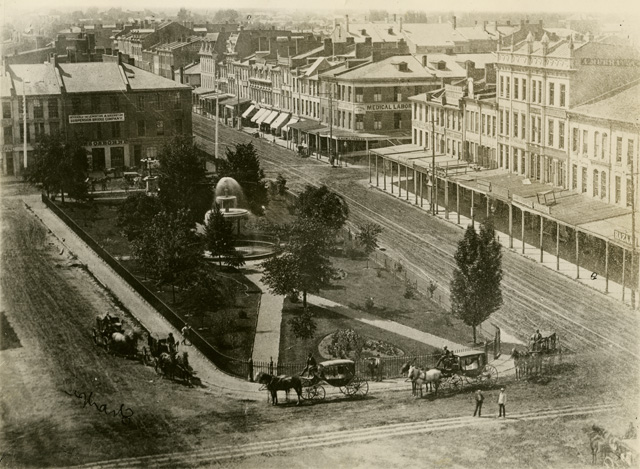
Gore Park in 1870. The park was a public square for the settlement, and remains the centre of the city.

As railway fever raced across North America, Hamilton prematurely got in the act with the promotion of various paper lines in the 1830s. This included Allan Napier MacNab’s Hamilton and Port Dover Railway which, although chartered in 1835, did not actually lay any track until the mid-1850s under a different corporate name. MacNab completed Dundurn Castle, his stately home, in 1835. A boy soldier in the War of 1812, he led Gore militia to crush insurgents in the Rebellion of 1837 for which he was knighted the following year.

== 1845–1866 ==
Official City status was achieved on June 9, 1846.

As a result of municipal reorganization of Wentworth County, Caistor Township (earlier and later part of West Lincoln) was briefly added in 1845. Hamilton received its city charter in 1846. Seneca, Onondaga and Caistor Townships were removed from the administration of county and replaced with three others from Halton County: Beverly, East Flamborough and West Flamborough (which were amalgamated as the Town of Flamborough 1974-2000).

Hamilton City Council was based on a board of control, which effectively meant an executive committee of at-large city councillors controlled the city government. Mayors were short-term figureheads who changed mostly on practically an annual basis. The same year Hamilton became a city, Robert Smiley and a partner began publishing ‘’The Hamilton Spectator and Journal of Commerce".

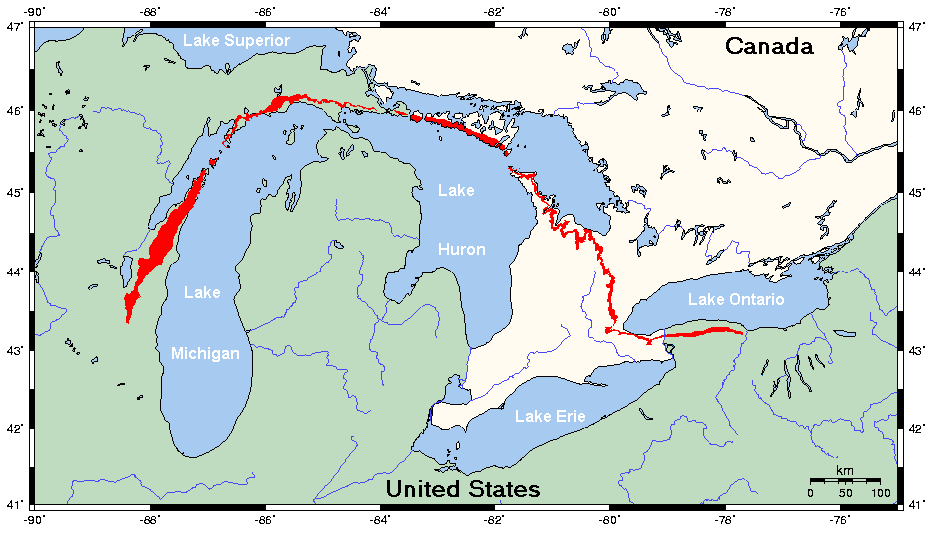
Map with the Niagara Escarpment in red. Easy access to limestone from the escarpment helped propel Hamilton into an important iron and steel producing city.

As MacNab completed his two years as the premier of the united Province of Canada, the newly renamed Great Western Railway became Hamilton’s first functioning railway in 1854. Completion of this railway and the Niagara Suspension Bridge transformed Hamilton into a major centre and part of the American immigration route from New York City or Boston to Chicago or Milwaukee. Over two hundred miles of distance was saved travelling through what was then called CANADA WEST. However, because of the different gauge or width between the American and Canadian tracks, passengers had to switch trains at both Niagara Falls, then known as Clifton, as well as at Detroit. The GWR’s maintenance and marshalling yards were located in Hamilton, and the city got its first taste of the steel industry as it re-rolled rails imported from Britain. Unfortunately, in 1857, 57 passengers were killed when a train derailed near the Desjardins Canal.

Not content with this relatively minor operation, dozens of small workshops and craftsmen banded together to smelt steel rather than just mill steel. Easy access to limestone from the Niagara Escarpment, coal mined in Appalachia, iron ore mined from the Canadian Shield and export markets through the Great Lakes-St. Lawrence system made Hamilton an important iron and steel producing city.

Other industrial ventures conducted in the Ambitious City (a phrase adopted by ‘’The Spectator" from detractors in Toronto) and Birmingham of Canada included manufactured tobacco, beer and other consumer products. It also became a centre for the textile industry, which did not die out completely until the 1950s.

Long before the Royal Military College of Canada was established in 1876, there were proposals for military colleges in Canada. Staffed by British Regulars, adult male students underwent a 3-month-long military course from 1865 at the School of Military Instruction in Hamilton. Established by Militia General Order in 1865, the school enabled Officers of Militia or Candidates for Commission or promotion in the Militia to learn Military duties, drill and discipline, to command a Company at Battalion Drill, to Drill a Company at Company Drill, the internal economy of a Company and the duties of a Company's Officer. The school was not retained at Confederation, in 1867.

== 1867–1892 ==
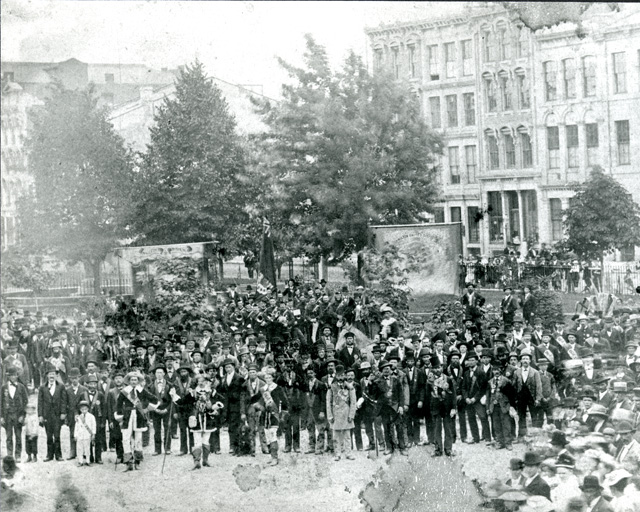
The Orange Order in Gore Park in the 1870s. The Order, made up largely of Northern Irish Protestants, grew in popularity with large scale immigration from the British Isles.

When the Dominion of Canada was established in 1867, Hamilton participated in the new political framework and supported its ties to the British Empire. The city was represented in the House of Commons by one seat for the city proper and two for the remainder of the county (Wentworth South and Wentworth North).

Growing commercial and industrial prosperity prompted large scale emigration from the British Isles. Many Irish immigrants created a Corktown in the general vicinity of John and Hunter Streets. Patriotic Britons and native born Canadians of British stock erected many public monuments downtown to honour John A. Macdonald, Queen Victoria and the United Empire Loyalists. More people meant more demand for services and information. In 1874, the Hamilton Street Railway (HSR) began offering horse-drawn public transportation.

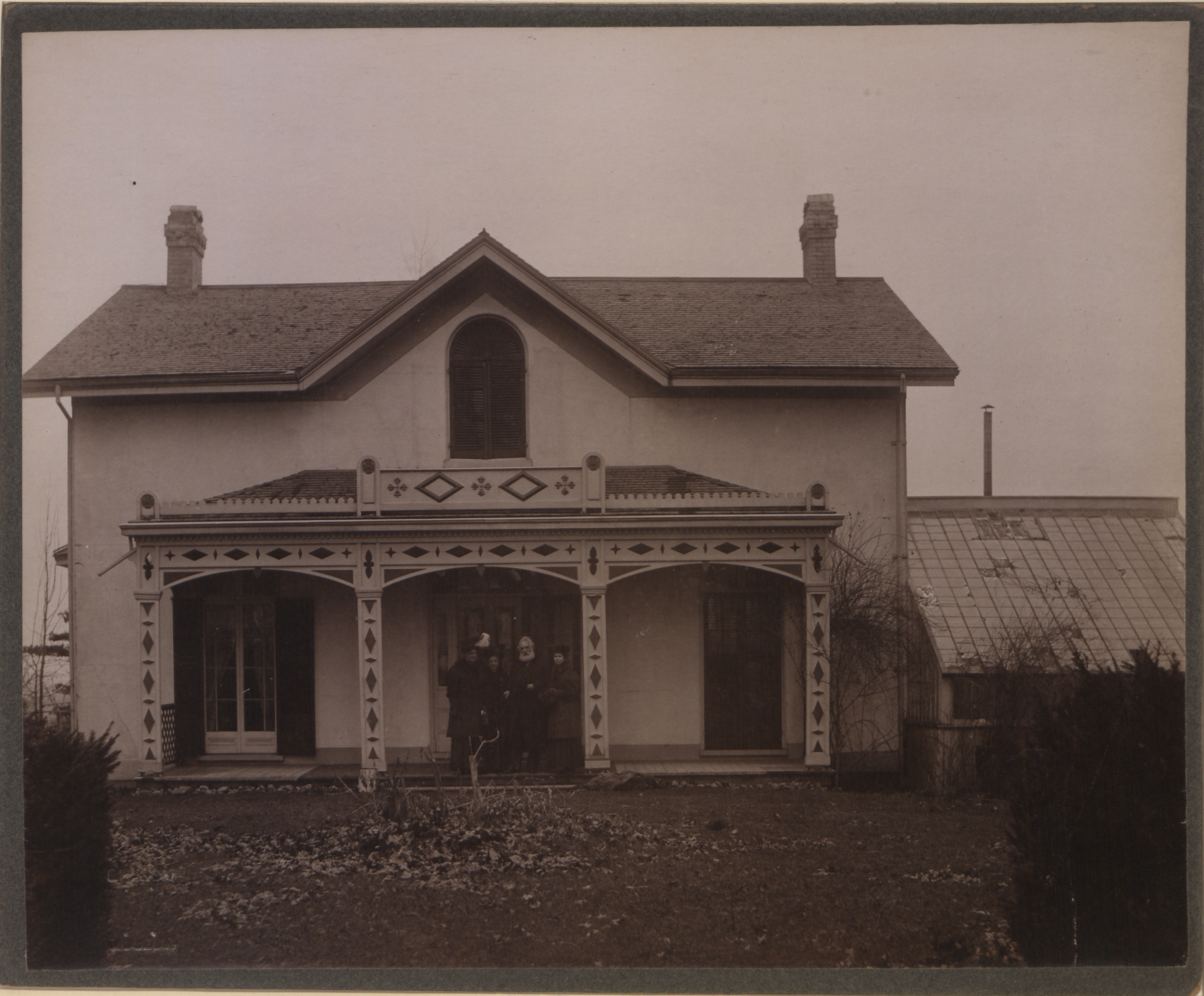
1906 photo of Alexander Graham Bell at his home in nearby Brantford. Hamilton was home to the British Empire's first telephone exchange.

Robert Smiley, the founding publisher of The Spectator, sold the newspaper to William Southam in 1877 as the first link in the Southam newspaper chain. A unified and paid Hamilton Fire Department, replaced the numerous volunteer fire companies in 1879, led by fire chief Alexander Aitchison.

The Hamilton area was also intimately connected with the early history of the telephone. While staying at his parents’ Brantford home in neighbouring Brant County, Alexander Graham Bell conceived of the idea of the telephone in 1874 and made the first experimental long-distance call to Paris, Ontario in 1876. The following year, retired Baptist minister Thomas Peter Henderson become the first General Agent for the telephone business in Canada. In 1878, the first telephone exchange in the British Empire was opened in Hamilton by Hugh Cossart Baker, Jr. On May 15, 1879, Hugh Cossart Baker Jr. makes Hamilton the site of the first commercial long-distance telephone line in the British Empire.

More workers and new immigrants encouraged a nascent trade union movement among skilled craftsmen. Hamilton unionists and other working-class people gave birth in 1872 the Nine Hour Movement, urging the government to limit working hours to nine per day.

A more modest but still unstable railway boom marked the last part of the 19th century too. The Toronto, Hamilton and Buffalo Railway was incorporated in 1884, and by 1892 offered limited cargo service and ultimately passenger service. Electrical railways which sporadically linked Hamilton with Grimsby, Beamsville, Brantford and Oakville were established the following decade.

== 1893–1905 ==
Modernization and business consolidation often went hand in hand with unionization. The HSR converted to electrically powered vehicles in 1892. In keeping with the area’s reputation, the firefighters unionized in 1896. As it was absorbed by Hamilton Electric Light and Power Company in 1899, HSR workers joined Division (now Local) 107 of the predecessor of the current Amalgamated Transit Union.

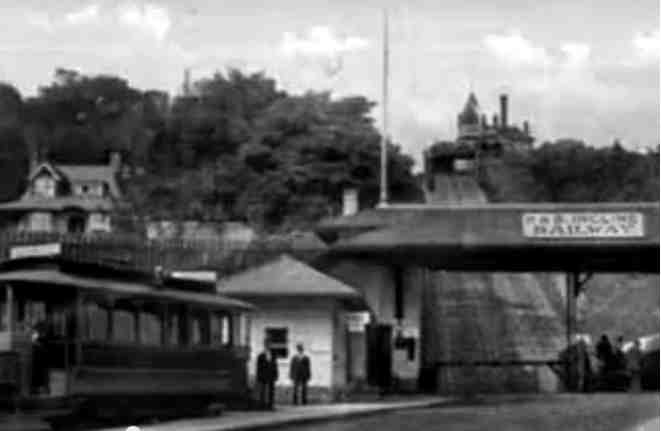
Hamilton Street Railway (HSR) streetcar in 1909. The HSR transitioned from horse-drawn public transit to electrical-powered vehicles in 1892.

But it was definitely not all work and no play for local residents. In 1894, Hamilton Herald newspaper and cigar store owner Billy Carroll established the Around the Bay Road Race. The route circumnavigates Burlington Bay and, although it is not a proper marathon, it is the longest continuously held long distance foot race in North America. It was won by such sporting greats as William "Billy" Sherring, Tom Longboat and Sam Mellor.

Adelaide Hoodless and other founded the first Women’s Institute in Saltfleet Township (Stoney Creek) in 1897 and began her educational campaign for home economics. A year after she died in 1910, one of Hamilton’s many new schools was named in her honour.

Hamiltonians, like other residents of the colonies, discovered one of the darker sides of British Imperialism when the South African War broke out in 1899. Men from Wentworth County and other Canadians volunteered to serve in the Canadian Mounted Rifles or North-West Mounted Police contingents. Although they excelled at the bitter guerrilla war there against the Boers, its conclusion in 1902 served as an omen for the future.

Ernest D’Israeli Smith, after being frustrated by paying to have his fruit transported from the Stoney Creek area, had founded a company in 1882 to market directly to wholesalers and eliminate the middleman. Smith & Sons Ltd. continues operating today, and has since the early 20th century has sold manufactured preserves and jams. Its namesake founder served as the Conservative MP for Wentworth around the start of the 20th century.

By the end of the 19th century, symbolically marked by the death of Queen Victoria in the first days of the 20th century, Hamilton expanded to the approximate limits of the Mountain Brow to the south, Chedoke Creek to the west and Gage Avenue to the east.

Through natural increase and immigration, the urban Hamilton-rural Wentworth population balance shifted so much that in 1904 the federal ridings were redistributed. While the total number of MPs remained the same, two were now from the city proper (Hamilton East and Hamilton West) and one represented the rest of the county.

== 1906–1918 ==
Hamilton had a momentous year in 1906: local boy Billy Sherring won an Olympic gold medal at Athens for the marathon. The Amalgamated Transit Union struck against the HSR in a bitter labour dispute. The working class voters of Hamilton East, sympathetic to the ATU, elected Allan Studholme as their Member of the Legislative Assembly of Ontario. For years he stood as the lone labour representative in the legislature, championing the eight-hour day, workmen's compensation, the minimum wage and women's suffrage.

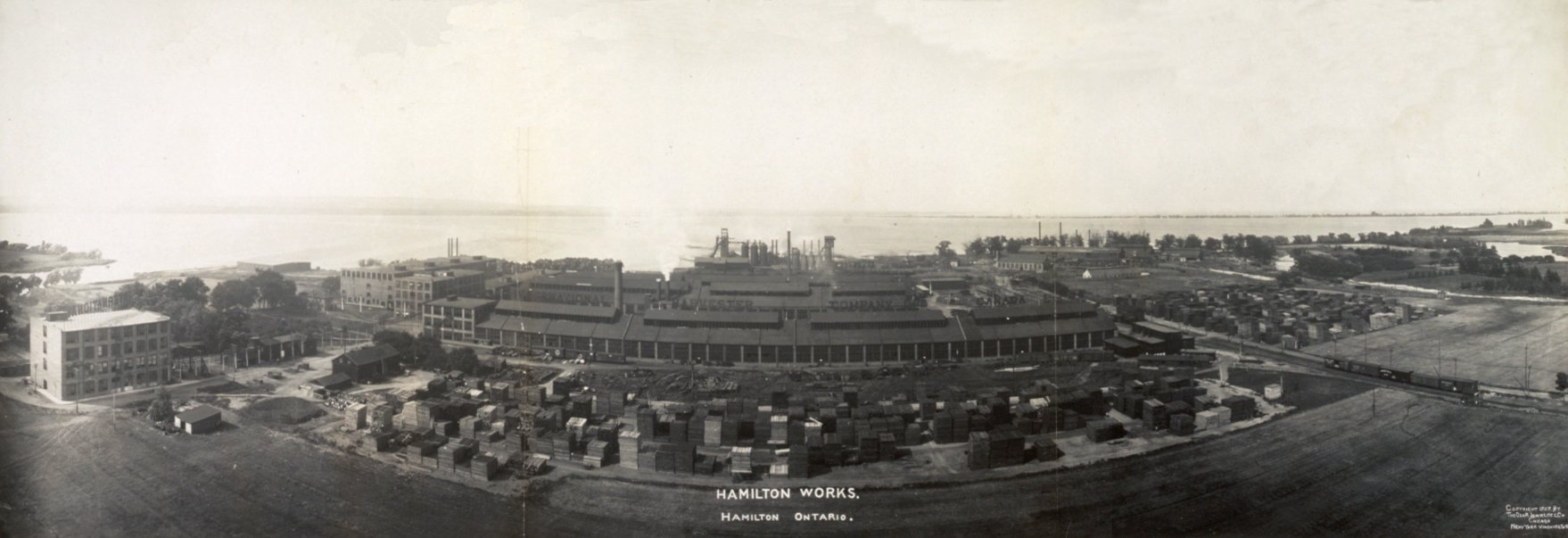
International Harvester Company buildings by the waterfront, taken in 1907. The beginning of the 20th century saw continued growth for industries in Hamilton.

The steel industry continued to grow and finally consolidate through this period, some combining to form the Steel Company of Canada in 1910 and others the Dominion Steel Casting Company in 1912. Stelco and Dofasco, as they became colloquially and then legally known, were located in the north end to take advantage of the transportation and cooling opportunities provided by access to the water. Industrial waste from the industries along the waterfront led to Hamilton Harbour becoming heavily polluted with industrial waste.

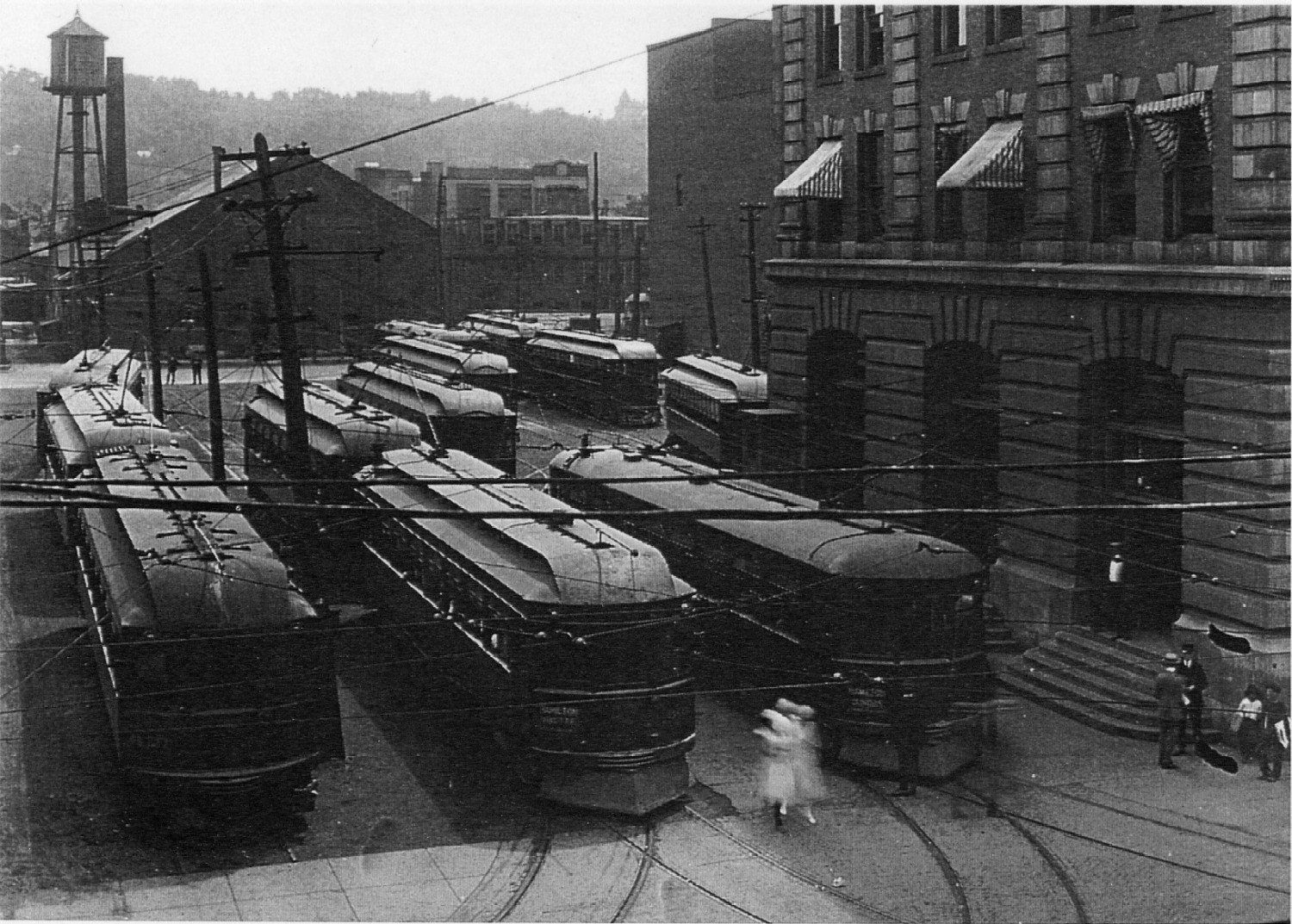
The yard at the Hamilton Terminal Station as seen in the early 1920s, during the station's heyday.

Hamilton's radial railway system became increasing unified. In 1907–8, the interurban railways' parent company reorganized and renamed itself to the Dominion Power and Transmission Company, opening a new main station downtown at the same time: the Hamilton Terminal Station. Passenger services were reorganized so that the different lines would meet there, while the older stations were largely relegated to freight service. Cars were increasingly operated on each other's lines, allowing single-seat trips such as from Oakville to Brantford without the need for a transfer.

The infant science of aviation found early and enthusiastic supporters in Hamilton. Jack Elliot established an airport in the north end near Stelco which in 1911 hosted the first Canadian Air Meet. Pioneering aviator J.A.D. McCurdy won that contest, sponsored in part by the newly minted Hamilton Automobile Club (now CAA South Central Ontario).

Emigration continued from Britain and the United States (chiefly blacks) during this period as local museums show, but also began from other countries such as Italy and Austria-Hungary. Remarkably, thousands of Italian Hamiltonians are descendants of emigrants in this period from a single Sicilian town, commemorated by the dual naming of Murray Street as Corso Raculmuto.

Increased population and prosperity prompted a building boom. As a publicity stunt and raffle, workers and contractors built a house in a day in 1913 which was later featured in a Ripley's Believe It or Not! cartoon. The same year, the Hamilton Public Library opened its new building funded by philanthropist Andrew Carnegie. (The site was renovated and now houses the Family Court.)

Hamiltonians participated in the First World War as combatants, but due to Col. Sir Sam Hughes' mobilization plans for the Canadian Expeditionary Force, there were no major battles associated purely with Hamiltonians. The Royal Hamilton Light Infantry later perpetuated the battle honours of four of these consecutively numbered Overseas Battalions of the CEF.

Heavy industry boomed as the Canadian and British governments' war driven demands for steel, arms, munitions and textiles increased. Unfortunately, in their quest to expand, the twin steel giants damaged the land by infilling Hamilton Harbour and burying or diverting many creeks which formerly flowed into the bay. War profiteering by manufacturers dampened some of the mood, but generally Hamiltonians pulled together.

The 36th Battalion of Hamilton, Ontario, taken in 1915. Hamiltonians participated in World War I as members of the Canadian Expeditionary Force.

== 1919–1938 ==
The United Farmers of Ontario won the most seats in the 1919 provincial election and formed a coalition government with the Independent Labour Party. Walter Rollo, Member of the Legislative Assembly for Hamilton West, became the first Ontario Minister of Labour in this government.

The Hamilton Board of Education resumed its ambitious building program for schools. Their names often honoured the memory of war veterans: Memorial School, Allenby School and Earl Kitchener School. The educational building boom was coupled with a residential housing boom in which hundreds of low-rise apartment buildings, of three to four stories and six to ten units, grew up across the city, especially in the east end.

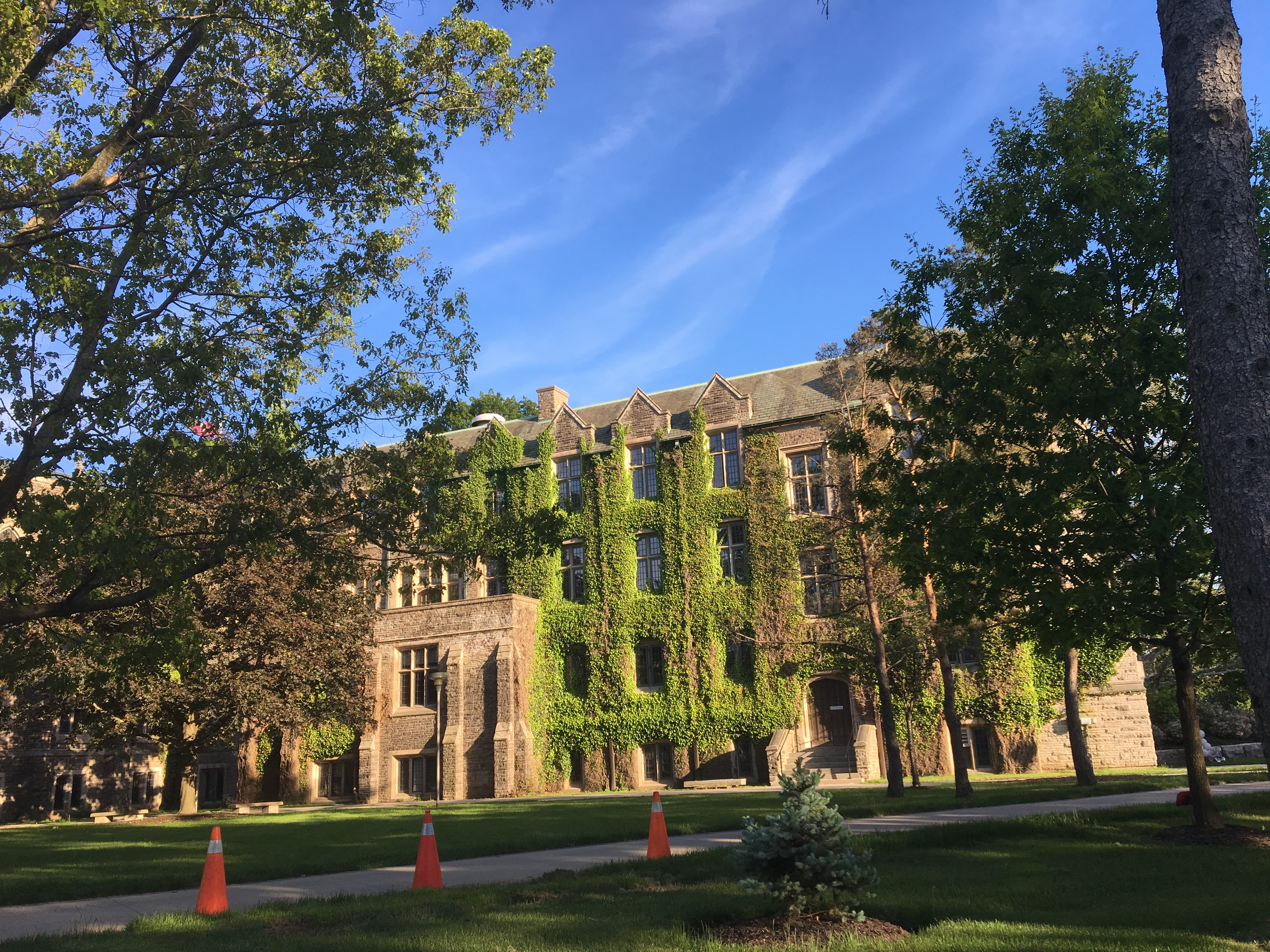
University Hall of McMaster University in 2017. The university moved to Hamilton in 1930.

Higher education—disregarding its normal school or teachers college—arrived in Hamilton in 1930. McMaster University was founded in Toronto as a Baptist institution of higher learning. Funded by a bequest of Senator William McMaster in 1887, it was in danger of becoming absorbed by the University of Toronto. Hamilton’s municipal government, civic boosters and ordinary residents lured the university to the city with grants of land and money in 1930. Not only did McMaster preserve its independence, but it began publishing The Silhouette student newspaper, now an award-winning weekly broadsheet.

Local boosters also ensured that Hamilton hosted the inaugural Empire Games, now known as the Commonwealth Games in 1930. Amateur athletes from around the British Empire and Commonwealth gathered to compete at Hamilton Civic Stadium, the current site of Ivor Wynne Stadium as a result of the efforts of Melville Marks Robinson.

The Great Depression of the 1930s hit Hamilton hard. The simultaneous and prolonged decline in domestic consumption and international trade in finished industrial goods and building supplies put a stop to residential and institutional construction for a decade. It was in this context of privation that Dr. Elizabeth Bagshaw started her illegal birth control clinic in 1931.

Emotional relief from the Depression was found in the Washingtons, local brothers who performed as a blues quartet throughout Ontario. Practical relief was found in government works projects designed to prime the economy and which added to the long-term attractiveness of Hamilton.

Thomas B. McQuesten, a Hamilton lawyer, alderman, and MLA, served as minister of transportation and chairman Niagara Parks Commission from 1934 to 1943. He spearheaded the construction of the Queen Elizabeth Way, a controlled access highway which links Fort Erie with Toronto via Hamilton, and the Mountain access for Highway 20 in Stoney Creek. He founded Royal Botanical Gardens, seeing the institution through from an early concept in the 1920s to incorporation and staffing in the 1940s. Whitehern, his downtown family home, now serves as a civic museum.

== 1939–1945 ==
In the Second World War, Britain decided to shore up its support in the Dominions by having a royal visit to Canada. When King George VI and his consort Queen Elizabeth visited Canada in May and June 1939, they stopped in Hamilton and also opened up the QEW.

Hamiltonians like others in Canada and the world welcomed the spike of economic demand caused by the war but not its source. Heavy industry again began spewing out its pollutants, and by the end of the war the ecological cost of pollution had taken its toll on Hamilton: heavy metals made fish from the Hamilton Harbour inedible, air pollution made breathing difficult and industrial dumps contaminated land.

Unlike the First World War, in this war the Canadian Army mobilized its territorially recruited militia units as a body rather than soliciting individuals to serve in conglomerated units. Men of the Royal Hamilton Light Infantry (colloquially known as the Rileys) and the rest of the 2nd Canadian Division were mobilized early, but sat on their hands in Britain for two years. The Hamilton area was also active in the Royal Canadian Air Force (RCAF): the city proper sponsored 424 "Tiger" Squadron by buying bombers to equip it.

On the home front, the public not only eagerly followed the progress of the war, but they also got a chance to see airmen in action. In 1940, as part of the British Commonwealth Air Training Plan, the Royal Canadian Air Force established a station in Glanford Township. Hundreds of Commonwealth pilots and other aircrew were trained at RCAF Station Mount Hope, and some unfortunate ones are still buried there.

The army’s enforced idleness—disregarding their unsuccessful foray to France in May 1940 and disastrous defence of Hong Kong in December 1941—led to discontent in the army, the public and the government. In this atmosphere, the timing was ripe for Lord Louis Mountbatten’s ill-advised and unauthorized raid-in-force. The Rileys lost hundreds of its young men on a single day in 1942, when they were effectively wiped out as a fighting force at Dieppe. In 1943, the Hamilton Parks Police, a special constable force was formed.

When the war finally ended, Hamilton was a much different place. Women had permanently entered the paid workforce. The lean times of the Great Depression were over—and veterans were going to make sure that happened.

== Notable people from Hamilton prior to 1946 ==
Historical population
Year	Pop.	±%
1816	668	—
1833	1,000	+49.7%
1841	3,000	+200.0%
1846	6,832	+127.7%
1850	10,248	+50.0%
1861	19,096	+86.3%
1871	26,716	+39.9%
1880	35,009	+31.0%
1890	44,643	+27.5%
1900	51,561	+15.5%
1910	70,221	+36.2%
1914	100,808	+43.6%
1920	108,143	+7.3%
1929	134,566	+24.4%
1939	155,276	+15.4%
1945	175,364	+12.9%
1950	192,125	+9.6%
1960	258,576	+34.6%
1970	296,826	+14.8%
1980	306,640	+3.3%
1990	307,160	+0.2%
2002^{†}	490,268	+59.6%
2006	504,559	+2.9%
2011	519,949	+3.1%
Source:^{†}2002=Post-Amalgamation.

People associated with Hamilton who became well-known prior to 1946 are listed below in the order of their birth year.

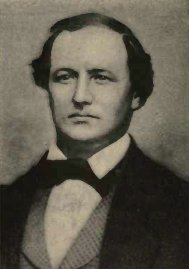
Colin Campbell Ferrie, Hamilton's first mayor

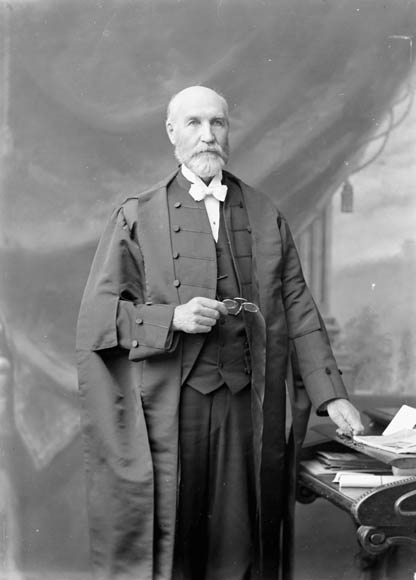
Thomas Bain, Speaker of the Canadian House of Commons

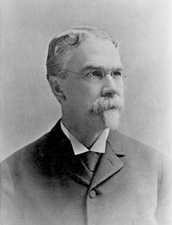
James McMillan was a U.S. Senator from the state of Michigan from 1889 to 1902.

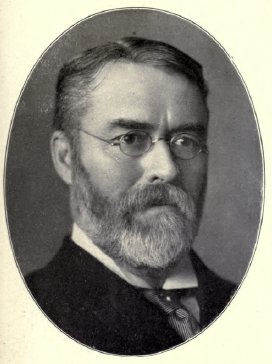
Sir John Morison Gibson

- Étienne Brûlé, (1592–1633), The first European to visit what is now Hamilton was probably Étienne Brûlé in 1616.
- Robert Land, (1736–1818), veteran of the American Revolution and one of Hamilton's founding citizens.
- John Askin, (1739–1815), was a fur trader, merchant and official in Upper Canada.
- Nathaniel Hughson, (1755–1837), Farmer & hotel owner, Loyalist who moved to Canada following the American Revolution, one of the city founders of Hamilton.
- William Rymal, (1759–1852), farmer and one of earliest settlers on the Hamilton mountain. Rymal Road was named after him.
- Richard Beasley (1761–1842), was a soldier, political figure, farmer and businessman in Upper Canada.
- John Vincent, (1764–1848), British army officer in the Battle of Stoney Creek, War of 1812.
- Richard Hatt (1769–1819), was a businessman, judge and political figure in Upper Canada.
- James Gage, (1774–1854), Lumber merchant, miller. Gage Avenue in the city named after him.
- James Durand, (1775–1833), was a businessman and political figure in Upper Canada.
- John Willson, (1776–1860) was a judge and political figure in Upper Canada.
- Peter Hess, (1779–1855), farmer, landowner. Peter and Hess Streets in the city named after him as well as Caroline Street named after one of his daughters.
- George Hamilton, (1788–1836), settler and city founder.
- Henry Beasley, (1793–1859), was a farmer and office-holder.
- Sir Allan MacNab, (Sir Allan Napier MacNab), (1798–1862), soldier, lawyer, businessman, knight and former Prime Minister of Upper Canada. MacNab Street in Hamilton is named after him.
- Thomas Stinson, (1798–1864), merchant, banker, landowner. He was an extensive landowner in not only in Hamilton but as well as Chicago, St. Paul, Minnesota, and Superior City, Wisconsin, which he named.
- George Perkins Boothesby Bull, (1795–1847), newspaper printer, publisher of one of Hamilton's early newspapers The Hamilton Gazette (1835–1856).
- Edward Jackson, (1799–1872), tinware manufacturer. Jackson Street, which stretches from just east of Dundurn Street South to Wellington Street South, was named after him.
- Peter Hunter Hamilton, (1800–1857), landowner and businessman + half brother of city founder George Hamilton. Hunter Street in city named after him.
- Peter Jones, (1802-1856), known in Ojibwe as Kahkewāquonāby; Son of Augustus Jones and Tuhbenahneequay, Indigenous Methodist missionary and Chief of the Mississaugas of the Credit First Nation, born on the Burlington Heights.
- Colin Campbell Ferrie, (1808–1856), Hamilton's first Mayor.
- Isaac Buchanan, (1810–1883), was a businessman and political figure in Canada West.
- Daniel C. Gunn, (1811–1876), wharfinger, locomotive manufacturer.
- James Jolley, (1813–1892), saddler, harnessmaker, politician. Funded construction of the Jolley Cut; a Mountain access road in Hamilton.
- John Rae, (1813-1893), physician, explorer. Discovered fate of the Lost Franklin Expedition; lived in Hamilton 1857–1860.
- Colin Campbell Ferrie, (1808–1856), Hamilton's first Mayor.
- Dennis Moore, (1817–1887), tinware manufacturer.
- Hugh Cossart Baker, Sr., (1818–1859), Banker, businessman, mathematician. Establishes the first life insurance company in Canada (21 August 1847); the Canada Life Assurance Company.
- Richard Wanzer, (1818–1900), sewing machine manufacturer.
- Thomas Mayne Daly Sr., (1827–1885), was a businessman and political figure in Canada West (later Ontario). He represented the riding of Perth North in the House of Commons of Canada and in the Legislative Assembly of Ontario.
- Thomas Bain, (1834–1915), Speaker of the Canadian House of Commons.
- Richard Butler, (1834–1925), editor, publisher, journalist. Butler neighbourhood in Hamilton named after him.
- George Elias Tuckett, (1835–1900), Tuckett Tobacco Company, Hamilton's 27th mayor.
- James McMillan, (1838–1902), was a U.S. Senator from the state of Michigan from 1889 to 1902.
- William Eli Sanford (1838–1899), was a Canadian businessman, philanthropist, and politician.
- George Washington Johnson, (1839–1917), teacher and songwriter; author of poem When You and I Were Young, Maggie, later turned into a song.
- Sir John Morison Gibson, (1842–1929), lawyer, politician, businessman.
- Clementina Trenholme, (1844–1918), Clementina (Fessenden) Trenholme, author, social organizer. Also, mother of Reginald Fessenden, the radio pioneer. Had two neighbourhoods on the Hamilton Mountain named after her, Trenholme and Fessenden neighbourhoods.
- Hugh Cossart Baker, Jr., (1846–1931), businessman, telephone pioneer.
- William W. Cooke, (1846–1876), was a military officer in the United States Army during the American Civil War and the Black Hills War. He was the adjutant for George Armstrong Custer and was killed during the Battle of the Little Bighorn. Buried in Hamilton Cemetery.
- Allan Studholme, (1846–1919), stove maker and first Ontario Labour MLA.
- Campbell Leckie, (1848–1925), engineer. Leckie Park neighbourhood in Hamilton named after him.
- Sir William Osler, (1849–1919), 1st Baronet, the Father of Modern Medicine.
- Robert B. Harris, (1852–1933), businessman who established The Hamilton Herald newspaper in 1889.
- E. D. Smith, (1853–1948), farmer, businessman and politician.
- James Balfour, (1854–1917), architect, Canadas Life Assurance Company building at corner of King & James (1883), City Hall on corner of James & York (1888).
- Robert Kirkland Kernighan, (1854–1926), poet, journalist. Kernighan neighbourhood in Hamilton named after him.
- Robert Stanley Weir, (1856–1926), lawyer, poet, author, best remembered as the author of the English lyrics to O Canada.
- Charles S. Wilcox, (1856–1938), First president of Iron and Steel Company of Canada, (later called simply Stelco), which was formed from five companies, including his Hamilton Steel and Iron Company.
- Sir John Strathearn Hendrie, (1857–1923), was Lieutenant Governor of Ontario from 1914 to 1919.
- Adam Inch, (1857–1933), dairy farmer, politician. Inch Park neighbourhood in Hamilton named after him.
- Andrew Ross, (1857–1941), businessman, builder of Tivoli Theatre & Barton Street Arena.
- Adelaide Hoodless, (1858–1910), education and women’s activist.
- John Moodie Jr., (1859–1944), executive, hobbyist, drove first automobile in Canada in 1898; a one-cylinder Winton he imported from Cleveland, Ohio.
- Thomas Willson, (1860–1915), Canadian inventor, designed and patented the first electric arc lamps.
- Sydney Chilton Mewburn, (1863–1956), was a Canadian lawyer and politician. He was the Canadian Minister of Militia and Defence from October 12, 1917 - January 15, 1920, under Sir Robert Borden's Union Government in 1917.
- John Charles Fields, (1863–1932), was a Canadian mathematician and the founder of the Fields Medal for outstanding achievement in mathematics. the Fields Medal, is considered by some to be the Nobel Prize in Mathematics.
- Helen Gregory MacGill, (1864–1947), the first woman in British Columbia to be appointed a judge of the juvenile Court, a post she held for 23 years.
- Peter Wiley Philpott, (1865-1957), a fundamentalist and evangelist, founded the United Christian Workers, a religious movement later known as the Associated Gospel Churches of Canada.
- Julia Arthur, (1868–1959), was a Canadian-born stage and film actress.
- Walter Rollo, first Ontario minister of labour.
- John M. Lyle, (1872–1945), Canadian architect in the late 19th century; New York Public Library (1897), Royal Alexandra Theatre, in Toronto (1907), Union Station (Toronto) 1914–1921.
- Clifton Sherman, (1872–1955), founded Dominion Foundries and Steel (later called Dofasco) in 1912 (with his brother Frank Sherman), creating a giant that would bring prosperity and identity to the city.
- Jean Adair, (1873–1953), actress. Although she worked primarily on stage (sometimes billed as Jennet Adair), she made several film appearances late in her career, most notably as one of the misguided murdering aunts of Cary Grant in Arsenic and Old Lace.
- Charles William Bell, (1876–1938), Playwright, Politician and Rocco Perri's Lawyer.
- Florence Harvey, (1878–1968), Golf, Ontario Ladies Amateur Champion 1904, 1906, 1913, and 1914. Canadian Ladies Champion in 1903 and 1904. Founded and served on the executive of the Canadian Ladies Golf Association. Member of Canada's Golf Hall of Fame.
- William Sherring, (1878–1964), was a Canadian athlete, gold medal winner of the marathon race at the 1906 Summer Olympics.
- Elizabeth Bagshaw, (1881–1982), physician and birth control activist.
- John Christie Holland, (1882–1954), In 1924, became an ordained Minister and served as Pastor of Hamilton's Steward Memorial Church. The church has been designated an historic site by the Ontario government because its solid history and connection to the infamous Underground Railroad. 1953 was honored as Citizen of the Year in Hamilton, the first African Canadian to be given that recognition.
- Robert Kerr, (1882–1963), was an Irish-Canadian sprinter. He won the gold medal in the 200 metres and the bronze medal in the 100 metres at the 1908 Summer Olympics.
- Thomas Baker McQuesten, (1882–1948), lawyer and Ontario minister of transportation.
- Rocco Perri, (1887–1944), 1920s Gangster. 'King of the Bootleggers'.
- Frank Sherman, (1887–1967), Founded Dominion Foundries and Steel (later called Dofasco) in 1912 (with his brother Clifton Sherman), creating a giant that would bring prosperity and identity to the city.
- Harry Crerar, (1888–1965), was a Canadian general and the country's "leading field commander" in World War II.
- Besha Starkman, (1889–1907), Criminal. Rocco Perri's wife and partner in crime. ("the Brains")
- Douglass Dumbrille, (1889–1974), was an actor and one of the Canadian pioneers in early Hollywood.
- James Lyle Telford, (1889–1960), was mayor of Vancouver, B.C., from 1939 to 1940.
- Florence Lawrence, (1890–1938), Hollywood's first movie star.
- Dick Irvin Sr., (1892–1957), NHL hockey player. Former head coach of Toronto Maple Leafs & Montreal Canadiens.
- Del Lord, (1894–1970), was a film director and actor best known as a director of Three Stooges films. (Grimsby Ontario)
- Helen Kinnear, (1894–1970), was a Canadian lawyer. She was the first federally appointed woman judge in Canada.
- Frank O'Rourke, (1894–1986), ex-pro MLB baseball player and long time New York Yankees scout.
- Cecil "Babe" Dye, (1898–1962), NHL hockey player, NHL's top goal scorer of the 1920s, inducted into the Hockey Hall of Fame in 1970.
- Harold A. Rogers, (1899–1994), was the founder of Kin Canada, is a Canadian non-profit service organization that promotes service, fellowship, positive values, and national pride.
- George Owen, (1901–1986) was a pro hockey defenceman for the Boston Bruins of the NHL.
- Robert McDonald, (1902–1956), was a Canadian soccer player from the 1920s and 1930s who spent a decade playing for famous Scottish football club Rangers.
- John Foote, (1904–1988), military chaplain and Ontario cabinet minister. Canadian recipient of the Victoria Cross.
- George Klein, (1904–1992), often called "the most productive inventor in Canada in the 20th century"; electric wheelchairs, microsurgical staple gun, the ZEEP nuclear reactor and the Canadarm.
- Red Horner, (1909–2005), ex-pro hockey player, helped Toronto Maple Leafs win their first Stanley Cup in 1932.
- Ray Lewis, (1910–2003), Track & Field, first Canadian-born Black Olympic medalist.
- Jackie Callura, (1914–1943), Canadian featherweight Boxer, World featherweight champion 1943.
- Syl Apps, (1915–1998), Legendary Toronto Maple Leafs captain who led the Leafs to 3-Stanley Cups. McMaster University Alumni. (Paris Ontario).
- Harold E. Johns, (1915–1998), was a Canadian medical physicist, noted for his extensive contributions to the use of ionizing radiation to treat cancer.
- Roy Brown Jr., (1916–2013), was a Canadian-American car designer and engineer, widely known for styling the Edsel.
- Jackie Washington, (1919-2009), blues musician and railway worker.
- Joe Krol, (1919-2008), Canadian Football quarterback (1932–53), Lou Marsh Trophy winner as Canada's top athlete in 1946.
- Win Mortimer, (1919–1998), was a comic book and comic strip artist for the DC Comics superhero Superman.
- Leo Reise Jr., (1922-2015), retired NHL hockey defenseman. 494-games played in the 1940s & 1950s for Detroit, Chicago and NY Rangers.
- John Callaghan, (1923–2004), Canadian cardiologist who pioneered open-heart surgery.

== See also ==
- Economic History of Hamilton, Ontario
- History of Ontario
- List of National Historic Sites of Canada in Hamilton, Ontario
- List of royal visits to Hamilton, Ontario
- Timeline of events in Hamilton, Ontario
