= Economic history of Hamilton, Ontario =

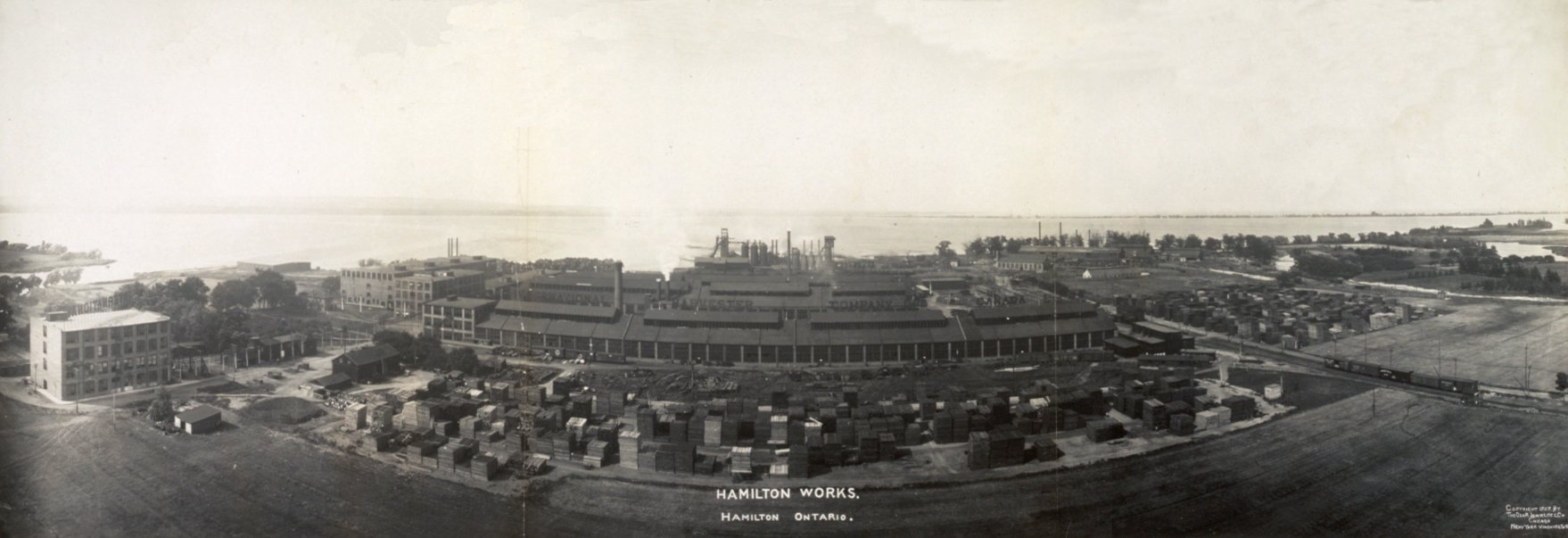
International Harvester Company plant and waterfront in Hamilton circa 1907

This article describes the Economic History of Hamilton, Ontario.

== Beginning ==
In the beginning, the Head-of-the-Lake (Present day Hamilton) was covered in forest. In 1815 a chopping mill became in the area. Growth of the area was aided in 1827 by a channel cut to link Burlington Bay directly with Lake Ontario, thus improving its marine transportation. In 1833, George Hamilton's settlement was incorporated as a police village. On January 8, 1833 the Legislature passed a further act "To define the limits of the Town of Hamilton, in the District of Gore, and to establish a Police and public market therein." When the Town of Hamilton was incorporated in 1833, one of the first orders of business, after a closely fought election where 3 out of the 4 candidates had no opposition, was to find a suitable place for the town board to meet. For the first few years they made do with meeting in local taverns such as Thomas Wilson's Inn on the corner of John and Jackson Streets. Also in 1833 (February 16), The Garland, a local newspaper, published a synopsis, Hamilton contained "about one hundred and twenty dwelling houses and upward of one thousand inhabitants" and then went on to list 4 public buildings, 7 taverns, 16 stores, 2 watchmakers, 2 saddlers, 4 merchant tailors, 4 cabinet makers, 4 boot and shoe makers, 2 bakers, 4 newspapers, 1 druggist, 1 tin and sheet iron manufactory, 1 hatter and 3 millineries.

== Early industry ==
Hugh Cossart Baker, Sr. established the first life insurance company in Canada 21 August 1847; the Canada Life Assurance Company. The newly renamed Great Western Railway (Ontario) became Hamilton's first functioning railway in 1854. Completion of this railway and the Niagara Suspension Bridge transformed Hamilton into a major centre and part of the American immigration route from New York City or Boston to Chicago or Milwaukee. The following season in 1856, Daniel C. Gunn engine shop on Wellington Street North, produced the first Canadian-built locomotives.

Bank of Hamilton $5 note, 1914

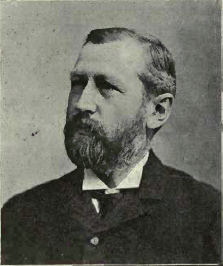
E. D. Smith

In 1862, The city invested in the Great Western Railway (Ontario) but the government of Canada favoured the rival Grand Trunk Railway. Also, at the end of the Depression (1857-1862), population dipped downward in Hamilton and the city could not meet the interest on its bonds, many of which were held by British investors. To temporarily save the city from its creditors, Henry Beasley removed the assessment rolls, thus preventing a levy of special tax. Foundries and machine shops associated with the Great Western Railway failed and several established wholesalers closed their accounts. Daniel C. Gunn's locomotive works went bankrupt, but the manufacturers of farm implements and stoves-the mainstays of iron foundries- were able to weather the crisis. Those owned by Dennis Moore and the Copp brothers endured, but their employees suffered wage cuts and layoffs. Canadian patent laws and the underemployed workers skilled in machinist trades lured an important new industrial enterprise from the U.S.A.- the manufacture of sewing machines by Richard Wanzer. From this development there evolved the ready-made clothing industry, which William Eli Sanford introduced locally. From judicial village to commercial town to railway centre, Hamilton moved to an ever-stronger dependency on industry. Then in the 1870s decade; Confederation era Hamilton boosters lose a commercial and financial edge to Toronto and consciously shift to the economic strategy of attracting industry.

Hamilton unionists and other working-class people gave birth in 1872 to the Nine Hour Movement, urging the government to limit working hours to nine per day.

Also in 1872, the Bank of Hamilton was established. It lasted until 1924. The Bank of Hamilton merged with The Commerce (later to become the Canadian Imperial Bank of Commerce, or CIBC) on January 2, 1924. It was one of the last surviving banks in Canada that was not headquartered in Toronto or Montreal.

One of the oldest companies still in operation today (January 2007) in the Hamilton region got its start in 1882. Ernest D'Israeli Smith, (E. D. Smith), after being frustrated by paying to have his fruit transported from the Stoney Creek, Ontario area, founded a company to market directly to wholesalers and eliminate the middleman. E. D. Smith & Sons Ltd. has sold manufactured preserves and jams since the early 1900s. Its namesake served as the Conservative MP for Wentworth around the turn of the 20th century.

Robert B. Harris (along with his brother John M. Harris) established the Hamilton Herald newspaper in 1889, beginning publication on August 1 and becoming Hamilton's first one-cent newspaper. Hamilton then became a 3-newspaper town: The Hamilton Spectator, The Hamilton Times and The Hamilton Herald.

In 1847, Hamilton's first large department store, The Right House, opened at a location on James Street. That building became Oak Hall in 1893 when the store moved to the north-west corner of King Street East and Hughson.

== Telephone city ==
Hamilton also played a role in the early development of the telephone. First on June 20, 1877, Hugh Cossart Baker, Jr. started up the first commercial telephone service in Canada in the city of Hamilton and then in 1878, he made the first telephone exchange in the British Empire. This was also the second telephone exchange in all of North America. The following season on 15 May 1879 he made Hamilton the site of the first commercial long distance telephone line in the British Empire. In 1880, (April 29) Hugh Cossart Baker, Jr. received a charter to build a national telephone company in Hamilton, Ontario. It was called the Hamilton Telephone Company and this was the charter that enabled the creation of the Bell Telephone Company in Canada. Hugh Cossart Baker, Jr. became the manager of the Ontario division until he retired in 1909. Baker learned of Alexander Graham Bell's invention in 1877 at the Philadelphia International Exposition and from there decided to test the communication tool in Hamilton. He leased four telephones for himself and his chess partners and on August 29, 1877, the telephone replaced the telegraph as the means to discuss their chess moves. Baker is also credited with helping to create the Hamilton Street Railway Company, the Hamilton Real Estate Association and the Canada Fire and Marine Insurance Company - all before he was 30 years old.

== "The Electric City" ==
Sir John Morison Gibson in 1908

Sir John Morison Gibson formed The Dominion Power and Transmission Company in 1896, that brought hydroelectric power, for the first time, to Hamilton from their plant at DeCew Falls. "One big reason" for the almost 75% increase in the population of Hamilton between 1901 and 1912, boasted Sir John Morison Gibson of Dominion Power and Transmission Company, was "Cheap Electric Power Furnished By Us." This simplistic explanation for the development of Hamilton in the early twentieth century leaves much unexamined, but one conclusion cannot be disputed. In the perception of the Hamilton public, a view certainly fostered by Gibson and his fellow hydroelectric promoters (John Patterson, John Dickenson (Ontario MPP), John Moodie, Sr. and John Sutherland; together known as "The Five Johns".), Hamilton was no longer regarded the Birmingham of Canada or the Pittsburgh of Canada Hamilton was now, as the title of a 1906 promotional booklet on the city proudly proclaimed, "The Electric City." Power was sent twenty seven miles from DeCew Falls, St. Catharines, using water from the old Welland Canal. New industries, such as the forerunners of the Steel Co. of Canada (Stelco) and Canadian Westinghouse, were attracted here by the cheaper, more efficient power. One time this Company controlled hydro power from Brantford to St. Catharines, including the Hamilton Street Railway and the area's radial lines. Sir John Morison Gibson became the Lieutenant-Governor of Ontario in 1908. (1908–1914).

The city's promotional booklets were stressing three key areas to lure new business and heavy industry to the city :

- Hamilton was "Home of the Manufacturer"
- had "Unrivalled Shipping Facilities"
- and was home to the "Cheapest Power in Canada."

By 1938, with a population nearing 155,000 inhabitants and home to 500 + manufacturing plants, (centre of Canadian Steel and Electronic activities), the city's promotional brochures were boasting that Hamilton was home to more than fifty flourishing branches of United States and British industries, with invested capital approximating $150,000,000. They were also advertising that "Hamilton was home to the cheapest hydro power in the entire world." As well, any industries contemplating establishment in Canada were to write to J.H. Moore, Industry Commissioner, T.H.& B. Railway Station. At that time Hamilton had attracted more American industrial capital than any other Canadian city.

== Big industry ==
The promotion of Electrical power helped remake Hamilton between 1895 and 1920 and the shift of Banking and Insurance from Hamilton to Toronto accentuated the Industrial focus.

The first Westinghouse manufacturing operation outside of the United States was established in Hamilton, Ontario in 1897 on Sanford Avenue, one year after The Dominion Power and Transmission Company was formed in Hamilton. This marked a new industrial era for Hamilton. It was then incorporated in 1903. Company founder George Westinghouse set up a factory to build air brakes for the booming rail industry. During the first two decades of the 20th century, several noteworthy engineers worked at Westinghouse, Hamilton, including Louis Hamel Cooke, Herbert Bristol Dwight, William Frederick McLaren, and Frank Elbert Harold Mowbray. Eventually the company was producing from its Hamilton plants electric ranges, refrigerators and washing machines. During each of the wars it was also producing guns, ammunition, anti-radar devices and bomb sights. At its peak in 1955, Westinghouse employed 11,000 people in Hamilton. (second only to Stelco)

International Harvester becomes the second major United States industry to locate in Hamilton, Ontario (1902). Originally known as Deering Harvester, the company plant sprawled along the Hamilton waterfront and claimed to be the "largest agricultural implement works in the British Empire." The plant was also involved in wartime production of specialized military items. The company started building heavy duty diesel trucks in Hamilton in 1959. The first to roll off the line was delivered to Dofasco, complete with a Rolls-Royce engine. Hamilton won over a number of Canadian cities when it successfully lured International Harvester. The reasons the company cited for its selection of Hamilton were as follows: it had waterside property that enabled the firm to control its own docks, its proximity to the steel industry, railway connections & the Cataract Power Company supplied them with cheap energy.

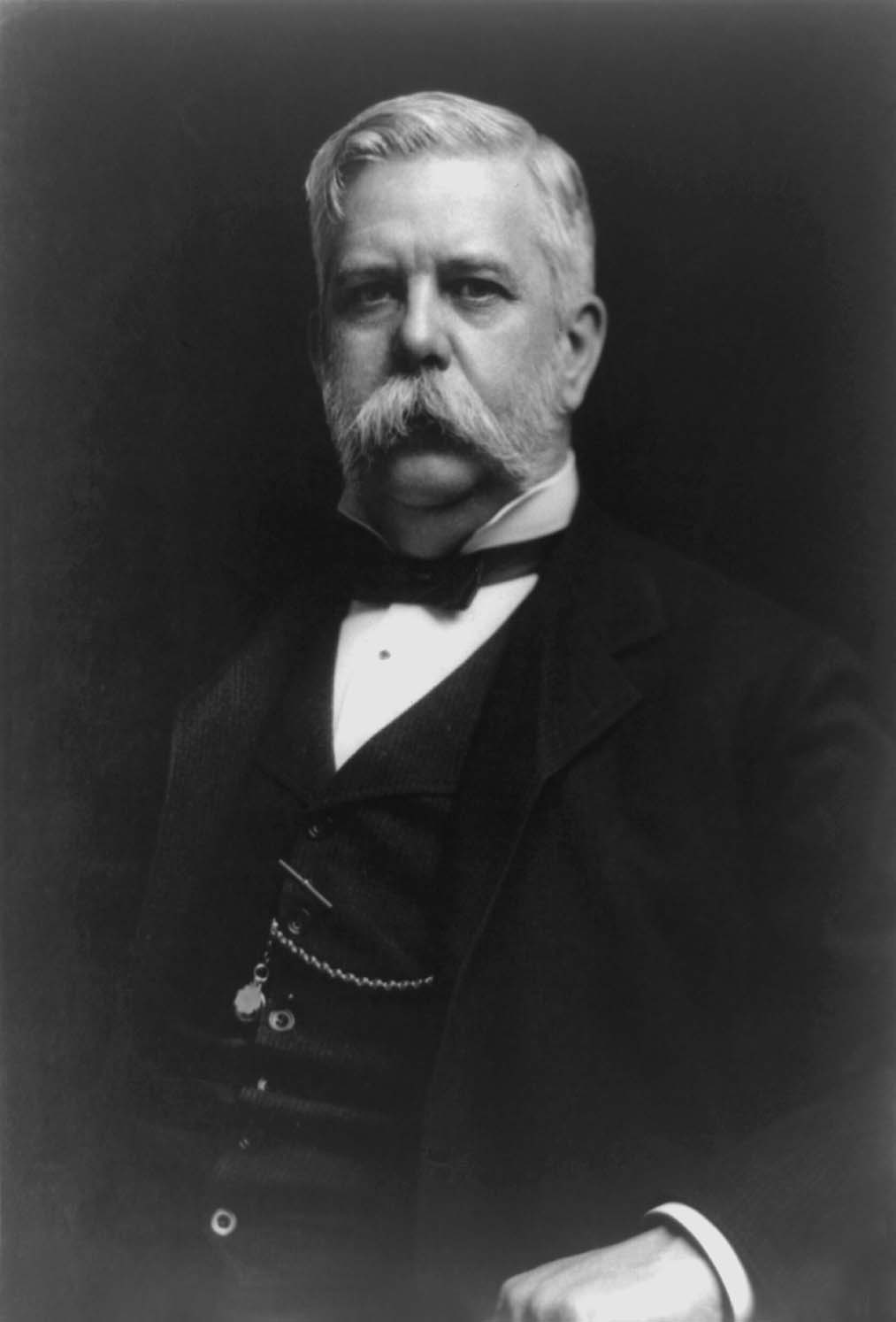
George Westinghouse

In 1902, Canadian Otis Elevator Company is formed (August 22) on Victoria Avenue North. For many years Hamilton was home to the largest single elevator manufacturing facility in the world. The workers produced all kinds of elevators, escalators and later, forklifts. In 1969, the company took over the old Studebaker plant. It was a return home for Otis, which had built the 350,000-square-foot (33,000 m^{2}) facility for wartime production of anti-aircraft guns and other military equipment.

In 1903, Canadian Canners Consolidated Companies Limited (later Canadian Canners Limited) was formed. The steel industry continued to grow and finally consolidate through this period, some combining to form the Steel Company of Canada (Stelco) in 1910. Dominion Steel Casting Company (Dofasco) established in 1912. Later named Dominion Foundries and Steel, the company merged with its subsidiary, Hamilton Steel Wheel Company in 1917. The name was officially changed to Dofasco Inc. in 1980. In 1912, National Steel Car is established in Hamilton. Builders of reliable freight and passenger train cars and equipment on Kenilworth Avenue North. Also by 1912, with 4.5 miles (7.2 km) of dockage, Hamilton is second only to Montreal in shipping.

The following season 1913, Procter & Gamble Manufacturing Company (based in Cincinnati) purchased 7 acres (28,000 m^{2}) of land and 2 acres (8,100 m^{2}) of water on the south side of Burlington Street between Depew and Ottawa Streets. This event marked the beginning of Procter & Gamble's operations outside of the United States. In 1914, Construction started on the Procter & Gamble Hamilton plant, which cost $1 million and consisted of seven buildings: the Crisco building, the boiler house, the gas plant, the soap building, the hardening plant, the kettle and glycerin house, and the machine shop. By 1915, Procter & Gamble officially opens Hamilton plant, employing 75 workers who made six different products.

In 1919, the Hoover Suction Sweeper Company builds a plant in Hamilton. and Firestone Tire and Rubber Company of Canada is established.

In 1922, the Beech-Nut Packing Company (makers of the Life Savers candy), establishes Canadian operations in Hamilton on Cumberland Avenue near Sanford. It was reported that when the company first started producing candy it was so pleased with the treatment from the city that it distributed free boxes of gum on the street and to every retailer in the city. By 1969 the company was producing more than a billion lifesavers candies a year in 26 flavours.

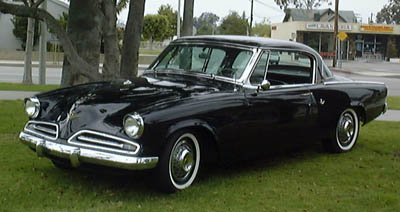
1953 Studebaker Commander Starliner, showing the streamlined design of the 1950s Studebaker.

Three well-known Canadian businesses got their start in Hamilton. First, In 1934 Hamilton is the birthplace of Canadian Tire. Two brothers John W. Billes and Alfred J. Biles with a combined savings of $1,800, buy Hamilton Tire and Garage Ltd. and rename it "Canadian Tire" because it sounds big. (1934-first official associate store opens up in Hamilton Ontario). Second, In 1956 Hamilton was the birthplace of the Pioneer gas station. November 29, 1956, on Upper James Street. Today (January 2007) there are over 140 locations across Ontario (8% market share in Ontario) making it one of Canada's largest independent gasoline retailers. Third, Hamilton became the birthplace of the Tim Hortons donut chain in 1964. The original store ("Store #1") still operates on Ottawa Street North.

== Studebaker ==
On August 18, 1948, surrounded by more than 400 employees and a battery of reporters, the first vehicle, a blue Champion four-door sedan, rolls off the Studebaker assembly line. The company was located in the former Otis-Fenson military weapons factory off Burlington Street East, which was built in 1941. The Indiana-based Studebaker was looking for a Canadian site and settled on Hamilton because of its steel industry. The company was known for making automotive innovations and building solid distinctive cars. 1950 was its best year but the descent was quick. By 1954, Studebaker was in the red and merging with Packard, another falling car manufacturer. In 1963, the company moved its entire car operations to Hamilton. The Canadian car side had always been a money-maker and Studebaker was looking to curtail disastrous losses. That took the plant from a single to double shift - 48 to 96 cars daily. The last car to roll off the line was a turquoise Lark cruiser on March 4, 1966. Studebaker officially shuts down the next day on March 5, 1966 as its last car factory. It was terrible news for the 700 workers who had formed a true family at the company, known for its employee parties and day trips. It was a huge blow to the city, too. Studebaker was Hamilton's 10th largest employer at the time.

== Mayor Sam Lawrence and Local 1005 ==
Following The Depression and World War II, industry and unions prepared to do battle in Hamilton. The strike for Stelco lasted 80 days. Confrontations between strikers and strike-breakers were frequent and often physical. Stelco management and many Hamiltonians appealed to Mayor Sam Lawrence to call for extra police to protect strike-breakers. The Mayor refused and stated publicly that 'he was a labour man first and mayor second'. Stormy strikes were waged in town by other companies that year as well, these include Firestone, Westinghouse and the Hamilton Spectator. In his lifetime Sam Lawrence worked closely with left-wing radicals to improve the lot of workers. He campaigned for an eight-hour work day, unemployment insurance, national health insurance, old age security benefits and government ownership of important industries and utilities.

On July 15, 1946, after a meeting at the Playhouse Theatre, on Sherman Avenue North, Local 1005 members of the United Steelworkers of America at Stelco marched to the plant gates to start the famous strike of 1946. The fight was over Union recognition, a 40-hour work week and wages. With the help of Hamilton's community this struggle changed Canadian Labour history. It forced employers to accept collective bargaining and helped start a mass trade union movement in Canada.

== Loss of big industry ==
Hamilton has lost some of its biggest industrial employers over the years. Several reasons have been cited for the job losses such as the high dollar, high energy prices and overseas competition; a challenge that all of North America has had to learn to deal with, not just Hamilton, Ontario. The city has been able to weather the storm and recover better than most North American cities and the three primary reasons are; its close proximity to Canada's largest and wealthiest market, Toronto, its close proximity to the Canada-U.S.A. border and third, it being home to the busiest Canadian Great Lakes port.

In 2006 Hamilton saw closures to plants such as Camco, Rheem Canada and the Procter & Gamble distribution centre. Several other companies saw a dramatic decrease in their workforce such as Trebor Cadbury Allan, Siemens Canada and Wentworth Mold.

Partial list of companies that once called Hamilton home.
Company	Start date	Left town
Dominion Glass Company	1864	1997
Otis Elevator Company	1902	1987
International Harvester	1902	1992
Canadian Canners Limited	1903	1986
Canadian Westinghouse Company Limited	1903	1997
Procter & Gamble Manufacturing Co.	1913	1998
Hoover Suction Sweeper Company	1919	1972
Firestone Tire & Rubber Co. of Canada	1919	1988
Studebaker of Canada	1948	1966
Susan Shoe Industries Limited	1955	1994
