= Jackson Street =

Jackson Street may refer to:

- Jackson Street (Augusta, Georgia) (former)
- Jackson Street (San Francisco)
- Jackson Street (Hamilton, Ontario)
- Jackson Street station (SEPTA Route 101), on the Media–Sharon Hill Line, in the borough of Media, Pennsylvania

== See also ==
- Jackson Boulevard, a street in Chicago, Illinois, also known as Jackson Street
