= St. Paul's Presbyterian Church (Hamilton, Ontario) =

St Paul's Presbyterian Church
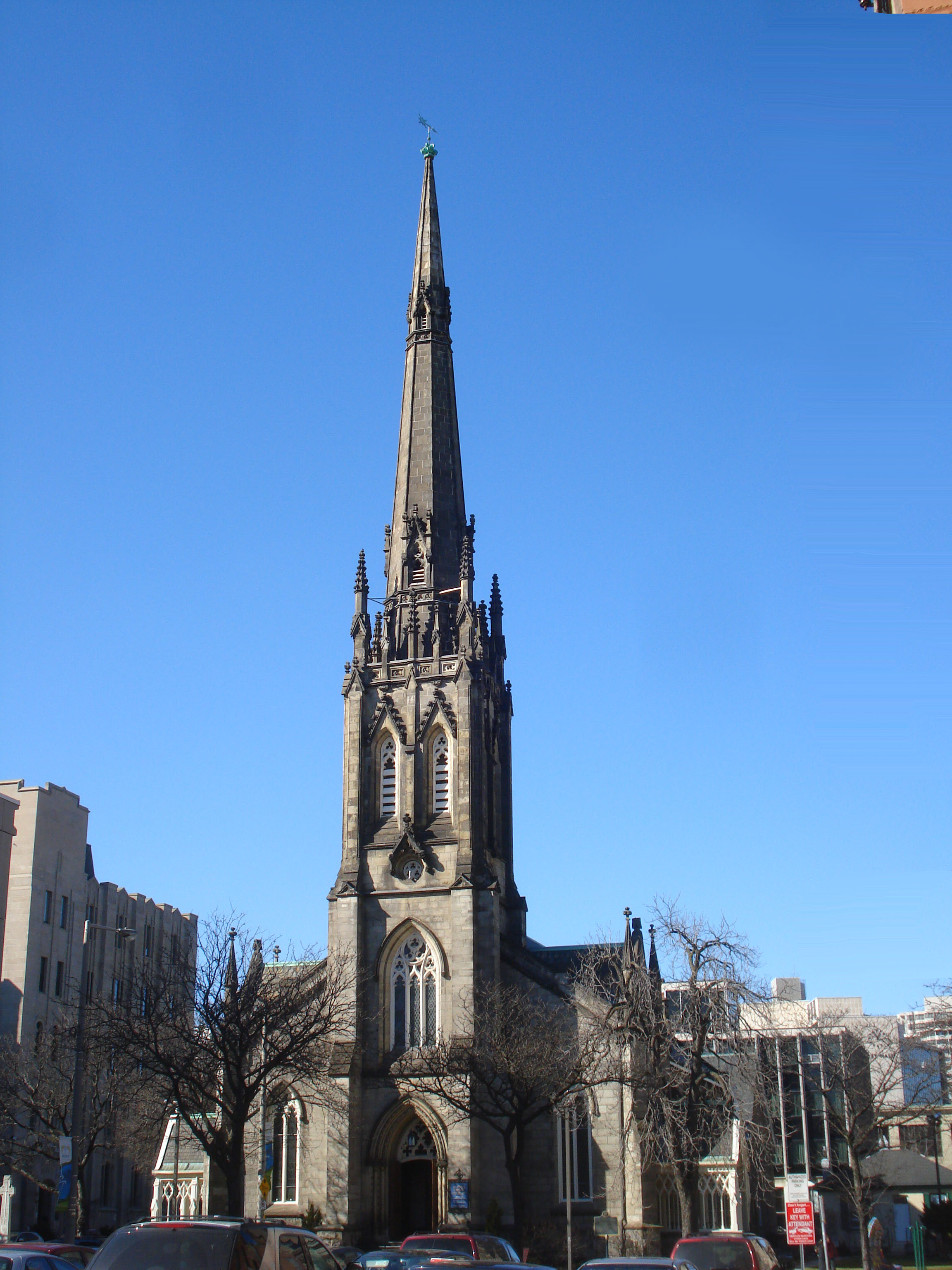
- St Paul's Presbyterian Church
- 43.255°N 79.869°W
- Location: Hamilton, Ontario
- Country: Canada
- Denomination: Presbyterian Church in Canada
- Churchmanship: Reformed; see Calvinism
- Website: http://stpaulshamilton.ca

History
- Founded: 1830; 196 years ago

Architecture
- Heritage designation: National Historical Site of Canada
- Designated: 1990; 36 years ago
- Architect: William Thomas
- Style: Decorated Neo-Gothic
- Completed: 1857; 169 years ago

St Paul's Presbyterian Church, Hamilton is a congregation of the Presbyterian Church in Canada located at the city centre of Hamilton, Ontario. The church building, designed by renowned architect William Thomas, is federally designated as a National Historic Site in Canada and provincially designated by the province of Ontario as a heritage site under the Ontario Heritage Act.

== History ==
The congregation was founded by Scottish immigrants in 1830, originally named St. Andrew's. The name was changed to St. Paul's in 1873. The building was constructed over four years, from 1854 to 1857. The choir at the west end of St Paul's was extended in 1909, designed by Hugh Vallance. The building was designated a National Historic Site in 1990.

== Building features ==
The church building was designed by William Thomas (architect) in the style of English Gothic Revival. The building's exterior is grey limestone which comes for the most part from local Hamilton quarries by stonemason George Worthington. Many windows are adorned with Gothic tracery. The sanctuary is made of dark wood. There is a chancel with rich foliage sculptures on the capitals. The church yard includes a small cemetery.

Architectural historian Marion MacRae assessed the building as "the best Decorated Gothic Revival Church in Ontario."

=== Steeple ===
The church has a single steeple made entirely of stone which rises to a height of 180 feet. The top of the parapet line is at 100 feet, at which point it almost imperceptibly reduces itself into an octagonal spire with lucarnes on alternate sides. The tower and spire display medieval details from the Middle Pointed or Decorated phase of English Gothic (late 13th to early 14th century), including twin, pointed belfry openings on each side of the tower. The corners of the tower are reinforced with buttresses at right angles to the walls. There are narrow angle turrets each with their own delicate spire adorned with crockets and a finial at the top.

It is the largest entirely stone steeple in Canada.

=== Bells ===
The chimes are eleven bells weighing in total 9,873 pounds (4,478 kg), ranging in size from the smallest at 300 pounds (140 kg) to the largest bell at 2,100 pounds (950 kg). The bells were used first on Sunday, 11 November 1906. The bells are functional and are played every Sunday morning and on special occasions.

=== Cross ===
On the south-east yard the Cross of Sacrifice, a large Celtic cross, was erected in 1921 as a war memorial. It was carved in Scotland and is similar to the ancient crosses in Iona. The arms of the Cross are truncated and the column tapers from its base to the apex. A circle symbolical of a crown or wreath surrounds the arms.

== Services and events ==
The church provides services of worship Sunday mornings and on other special occasions, including weddings. The church participates in the annual "Doors Open" event, a citywide weekend-long event in the autumn which permits tours of historical buildings of Hamilton.

== See also ==
- List of National Historic Sites of Canada in Hamilton, Ontario
