= List of National Historic Sites of Canada in Hamilton, Ontario =

This is a list of National Historic Sites (French: Lieux historiques nationaux du Canada) in Hamilton, Ontario. There are 15 National Historic Sites designated in Hamilton, of which one (HMCS Haida) is administered by Parks Canada (identified below by the beaver icon). Burlington Heights was designated in 1929 and was the first site designated within what are now the boundaries of Hamilton.

Numerous National Historic Events also occurred in Hamilton, and are identified at places associated with them, using the same style of federal plaque which marks National Historic Sites. Several National Historic Persons are commemorated throughout the city in the same way. The markers do not indicate which designation—a Site, Event, or Person—a subject has been given.

National Historic Sites located elsewhere in Ontario are listed at National Historic Sites in Ontario.

This list uses names designated by the national Historic Sites and Monuments Board, which may differ from other names for these sites.

== National Historic Sites ==
| Site | Date(s) | Designated | Location | Description | Image |
|---|---|---|---|---|---|
| Battle of Stoney Creek | 1813 (battle) | 1960 | Stoney Creek; 43.217271°N 79.766244°W | The site of a British victory that marked a turning point in the War of 1812, representing the most advanced position achieved by American forces in the Niagara campaign | View of the Stoney Creek Battlefield Monument |
| Burlington Heights | 1813-14 (wartime activities) | 1929 | Hamilton; 43°16′14″N 79°53′10″W | An assembly point and supply depot for the defence of the Niagara Peninsula and support of the navy on Lake Ontario during the War of 1812 | Stone marker at Burlington Heights |
| Dundurn Castle | 1835 (completed) | 1984 | Hamilton; 43.269481°N 79.884649°W | Picturesque-style villa of magnate Sir Allan Napier MacNab, 1st Baronet | View of Dundurn Castle |
| Erland Lee (Museum) Home | 1808 (completed) | 2002 | Hamilton; 43°12′24″N 79°43′18″W | A Carpenter Gothic farmhouse recognized as the birthplace of an important national and international women's movement, where the constitution of the first Women's Institute was drafted | Exterior view of Erland Lee Home |
| Former Hamilton Customs House | 1860 (completed) | 1990 | Hamilton; 43°15′58.91″N 79°52′1.97″W | A former customs house now serving as the Workers Arts and Heritage Centre; a noted example of Italianate architecture, which was popular in Canada from the 1840s to the 1870s; based on designs by Frederick Preston Rubidge 1858 | The front facade of the former customs house in Hamilton |
| Former Hamilton Railway Station (Canadian National) | 1931 (completed) | 2000 | Hamilton; 43°15′58.91″N 79°52′1.97″W | Built by Canadian National Railway, the railway station is a rare surviving example of an interwar station built according to the tenets of the City Beautiful movement; it served as an important immigration gateway after the Second World War | Exterior view of the Former Hamilton Railway Station |
| Griffin House | 1827 (completed) | 2008 | Hamilton; 43°14′9.42″N 80°0′11.26″W | A rare surviving example of a four-room house typical in Upper Canada in the early 19th century; was owned by Enerals Griffin, a Black immigrant from Virginia who settled here in 1834, and the house is associated with Black settlement in British North America and the Underground Railroad | Exterior view of Griffin House |
| Hamilton Waterworks | 1859 (completed) | 1977 | Hamilton; 43°15′22.45″N 79°46′14.51″W | Built to deliver large quantities of clean water for safe drinking and fire control to rapidly expanding Hamilton, the waterworks is a rare surviving example of a Victorian industrial complex that is largely architecturally and functionally intact | Main buildings and chimney of Hamilton Waterworks |
| HMCS Haida | 1942 (constructed) | 1984 | Hamilton; 43.27531°N 79.85538°W | Last of the World War II Tribal-class destroyers; moored and open to the public as a museum ship at Hamilton Harbour | View of HMCS Haida at Hamilton Harbour |
| John Weir Foote Armoury | 1888 (completed) | 1989 | Hamilton; 43°15′42.76″N 79°51′58.42″W | Named after John Weir Foote, the north section of the building is representative of the second evolutionary stage in drill hall construction in Canada (in the 1870s to 1890s) | Exterior view of the John Weir Foote Armoury |
| McQuesten House / Whitehern | 1848 (completed) | 1962 | Hamilton; 43.2546°N 79.8721°W | The two-storey neoclassical home of Thomas McQuesten, now serving as a museum; a superior and intact example of mid-19th-century residential architecture in Ontario | Exterior view of Whitehern |
| Royal Botanical Gardens | 1920s (established) | 1993 | Hamilton; 43°17′27.54″N 79°52′30.71″W | Comprising 1,100 hectares (2,700 acres) clustered around Burlington Bay, it is one of Canada's most important botanical gardens, and is the international registration authority for cultivar names of lilacs; named Canada's "National Focal Point" for plant conservation targets under the United Nations’ Convention on Biological Diversity | Rock gardens at the Royal Botanical Gardens |
| Sandyford Place | 1856 (completed) | 1975 | Hamilton; 43°15′6.98″N 79°52′23.72″W | A row of stone terrace houses, typical of the construction style in Hamilton at a time when Scottish settlers sought to recreate the stone terraces of Scottish towns; a good example of the housing erected for merchants in the mid-19th century | External view of the Sandyford Place row houses |
| St. Paul's Presbyterian Church / Former St. Andrew's Church | 1857 (completed) | 1990 | Hamilton; 43.254761°N 79.870282°W | An excellent representative example of the Gothic Revival style in a small, urban parish church | View of St. Paul's Presbyterian Church |
| Victoria Hall | 1888 (completed) | 1995 | Hamilton; 43.255691°N 79.867267°W | A three-and-a-half-storey, commercial building with a hand-made, galvanized sheet-metal façade on the front of its upper storeys; a very rare example of an in-situ, hand-made, sheet-metal façade in Canada, and one of the most architecturally accomplished of the surviving sheet metal façades in the country | Victory Hall Front Elevation |

== See also ==
- History of Hamilton, Ontario
