= Herbert Bristol Dwight =

American-Canadian electrical engineer

Herbert Bristol Dwight (8 September 1885, Geneva, Illinois – 30 June 1975) was an American-Canadian electrical engineer.

Dwight was educated in elementary and secondary schools in Ontario, attended Toronto University for two years, and then attended McGill University, graduating there in 1909 with a B.Sc. in electrical engineering. He developed a method for calculating the skin effect resistance ratio of a tubular conductor and derived formulas for mutual inductance of coils with parallel axes, repulsion of coils with parallel axes, and self-inductance of long cylindrical coils.

He was an Invited Speaker at the ICM in Toronto in 1924.

== Selected publications ==
- Transmission line formulas for electrical engineers and engineering students. Constable & co. 1913.
- Constant-voltage transmission; a discussion of the use of synchronous motors for eliminating variation in voltage in electric power systems. Wiley. 1915.
- Transmission line formulas; a collection of methods of calculation for the electrical design of transmission lines. D. Van Nostrand company. 1925.
- Tables of integrals and other mathematical data. A series of mathematical texts. The Macmillan company. 1934.
- Electrical coils and conductors, their electrical characteristics and theory. 1945.
- Electrical elements of power transmission lines. 1954.
