= List of royal visits to Hamilton, Ontario =

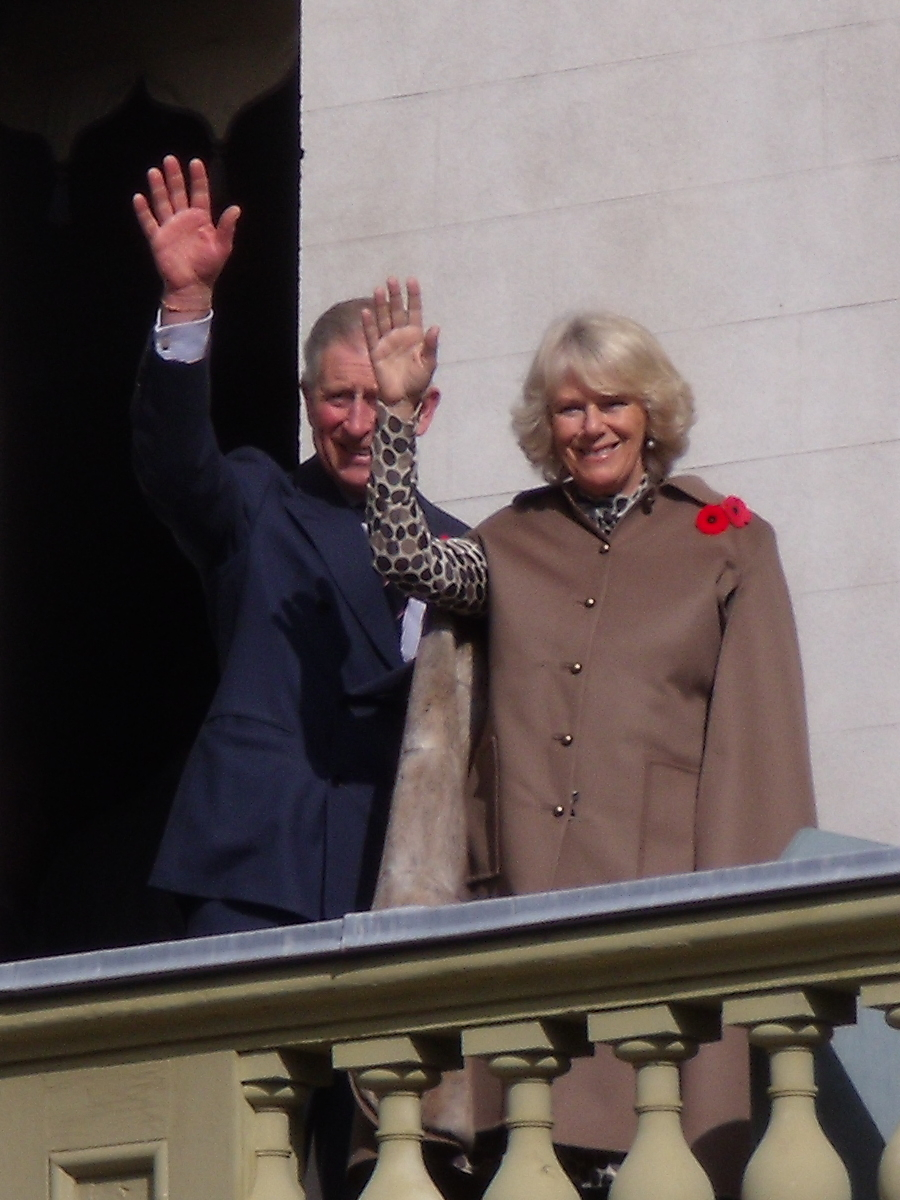
Charles, Prince of Wales and Camilla, Duchess of Cornwall at Dundurn Castle

Hamilton, the tenth-largest city in Canada, has hosted visits by the Canadian royal family since the 19th century.

Year	Royal visitors	Notes
1860	Prince Albert Edward, Prince of Wales	Later became King Edward VII; opens Gore Park (town centre) and the Crystal Palace.
1869	Prince Arthur, Duke of Connaught and Strathearn	*
1883	Prince George of Wales	Later became King George V.
1901	The Duke and Duchess of Cornwall and York	Later become King George V and Queen Mary.
1919	Prince Edward, Prince of Wales	Later became King Edward VIII and abdicated.
1927	Prince Edward, Prince of Wales, and Prince George	*
1939	King George VI and Queen Elizabeth	Opened the Queen Elizabeth Way in Hamilton.
1941	Prince George, Duke of Kent	2nd visit to Hamilton.
1951	Princess Elizabeth	Later became Queen Elizabeth II.
1958	Princess Margaret	*
1959	Queen Elizabeth II	2nd visit to Hamilton.
1974	Princess Anne	*
1980	Prince Philip, Duke of Edinburgh	Helps open the Hamilton Public Library.
1988	Princess Margaret, Countess of Snowdon	*
1996	Prince Charles, Prince of Wales	Visits the Canadian Warplane Heritage Museum.
2002	Queen Elizabeth II	3rd visit to Hamilton; presents colours to The Argyll and Sutherland Highlanders of Canada (Princess Louise's) at Copps Coliseum
2009	Prince Charles, Prince of Wales and Camilla, Duchess of Cornwall	Visit to Dundurn Castle and HMCS Haida.
2012	Prince Edward, Earl of Wessex and Sophie, Countess of Wessex	Canadian Warplane Heritage Museum and John Weir Foote Armoury.

== See also ==
- Historical timeline of events in Hamilton, Ontario
