= Edward Jackson (manufacturer) =

American manufacturer (1799–1872)

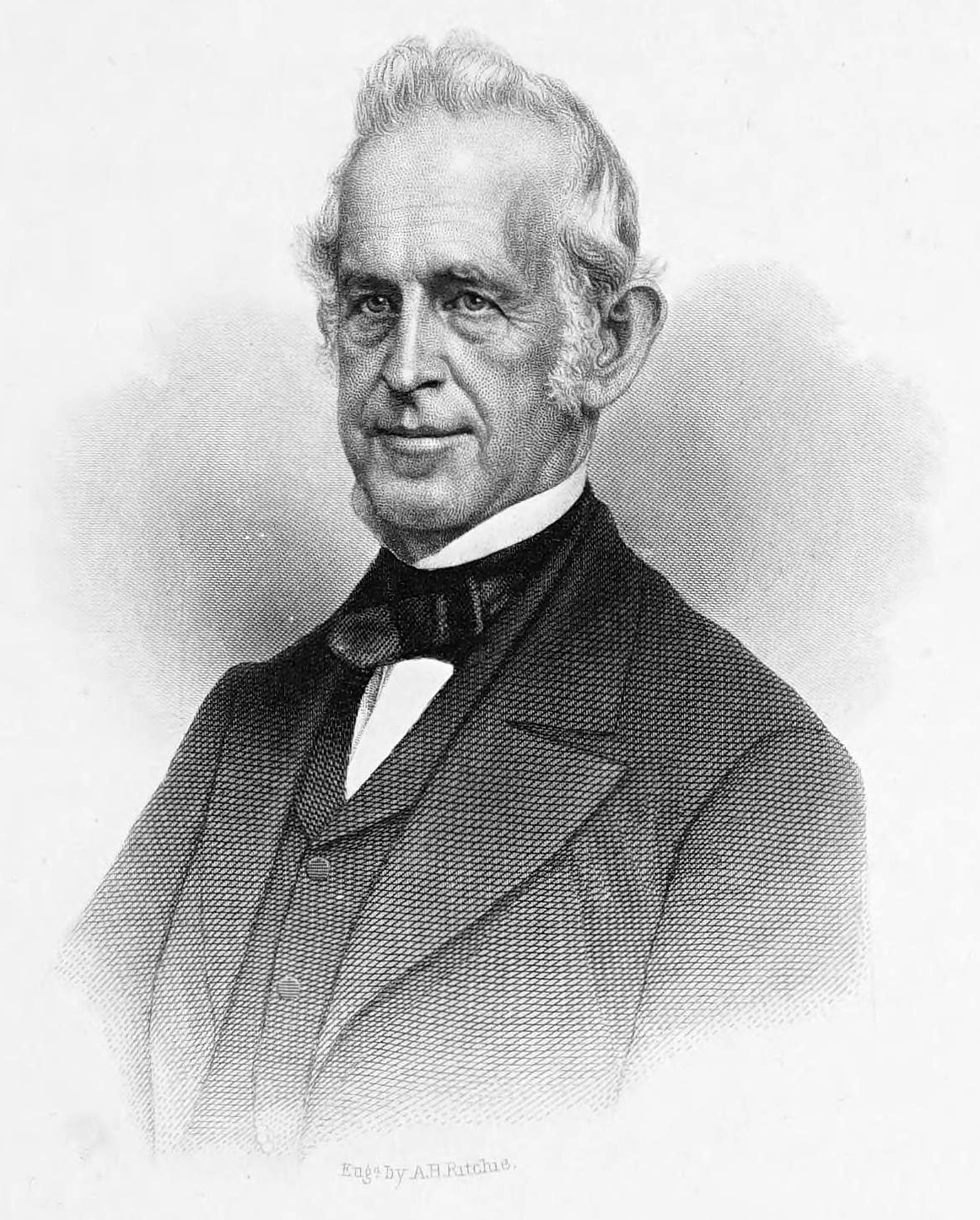
- Jackson in an 1880 engraving
- Born: April 20, 1799; Redding, Connecticut, United States
- Died: July 14, 1872 (aged 73); Hamilton, Ontario, Canada
- Occupation: Businessman
- Spouse: Lydia Ann Sanford

Edward Jackson (20 April 1799 – 14 July 1872) was a tinware manufacturer in Canada.

Jackson was born in Redding, Connecticut. He came to Canada with his wife Lydia Ann Sanford in 1826 and settled at Niagara (Niagara-on-the-Lake), where he opened a tinware business. Two years later he moved to Ancaster, Upper Canada and opened up a similar firm. The Tin Factory offices were on King Street East near Catharine Street; a foundry was on Catharine near Robert Street.

Jackson was also involved in other commercial enterprises. He was a shareholder and director of the Gore Bank, director of the Hamilton and Lake Erie Railway, a stockholder in the London and Gore Railway and a provisional director of the Bank of Hamilton.

He gave freely to societies established to assist the freed slaves following the American Civil War. His wife was also involved in charitable work.

Jackson had one daughter who survived infancy, Emmeline, and she married Jackson's nephew, William Eli Sanford.

Jackson died in Hamilton, Ontario at the age of 73.

== Legacy ==
Jackson Street in the city of Hamilton, Ontario is named after him. He resided on Maiden Lane, and after his death its name was changed to Jackson Street in his honour. A memorial plaque commemorating his work may be seen in Centenary Church.
