= Campbell Leckie =

British engineer

Campbell Leckie (1848, Glasgow – 14 January 1925, Hamilton, Ontario) was a Scottish-Canadian engineer.

Leckie completed his technical school training in Scotland, becoming a marine engineer on ships in the Atlantic. He emigrated to Hamilton in 1873, working as a marine engineer and machinist in the Grand Trunk Railway shops. In 1897 he became engineer at the City Disposal Works and worked his way up to chief engineer in 1904 where he stayed until 1922.

== Tribute ==
The Leckie Park neighbourhood on the Hamilton, Ontario Mountain was named after him. It is bounded by Highland Road West (north), Rymal Road East (south), 2nd Road West (west), and Upper Centennial Parkway (east). It is mostly a residential area on the south-east corner of the city. Landmarks include Whitedeer Park and Cline Park.
