= Hamilton Parks Police =

Special constable force in Ontario, Canada

The Hamilton Parks Police Force was a special constable force, formed in 1943 to patrol parks within the City of Hamilton, Ontario.

== History ==
By 1955, the Hamilton Board of Parks Management was considering disbanding the force, but ultimately retained it to save money.

Originally three special constables were employed by the Hamilton Parks Police, but by 1960 a fourth was added. Their duties were defined as keeping order in the parks, but not investigating crimes. Te city police provided backup as needed. By 1963, the parks police had expanded to a six-man force.

On June 28, 1963, the Hamilton Board of Parks Management disbanded the parks police following a dispute over, amongst other things, pay and bargaining rights. The six former special constables became "parks custodians".

Later the Hamilton Police Force dedicated officers to the park from May to September. This unit was known as the "Parks Patrol" and was generally staffed by plainclothes officers.

== Sources ==
- Clipping Files. Hamilton - Parks - Parks Police. Local History & Archives, HPL.
- Hamilton Police Department Scrapbook. vol. 9. p. 37. Local History & Archives, HPL.
- Steel Shots. August 23, 1963. p. 5.
