= John Moodie =

John Moodie, Jr. (1859 in Hamilton, Canada West – 8 August, 1944) was a Canadian textile manufacturer, executive, and hobbyist.

In 1903, Moodie was founder of the Hamilton Automobile Club (now CAA South Central Ontario), the first organization of its kind in Canada. He also belonged to the Royal Auto Club of London, England.

Moodie invested in many businesses. He co-founded the Eagle Knitting Co. in Hamilton, 1888 with his father, John Moodie, Sr. and brother James Robert. As well, his father helped establish The Hamilton Cataract Power Co. and Moodie invested heavily in the project. He was also president of the following companies; The Royal Distillery (Hamilton) for nine years, Robinson Industries (Hamilton), Dover Industries (Chatham, Ontario) and also, president of a company operating the Hamilton-Toronto steamer run.

Moodie was credited with the following; He owned the first player piano in Hamilton, owned the first bicycle in Canada (1878), owned the first motorboat in the Hamilton Bay and also owned the first automobile in Canada (in Hamilton 1898), a one-cylinder Winton he imported from Cleveland, Ohio.
