= Jackson Street (Hamilton, Ontario) =

Street in Hamilton, Ontario, Canada

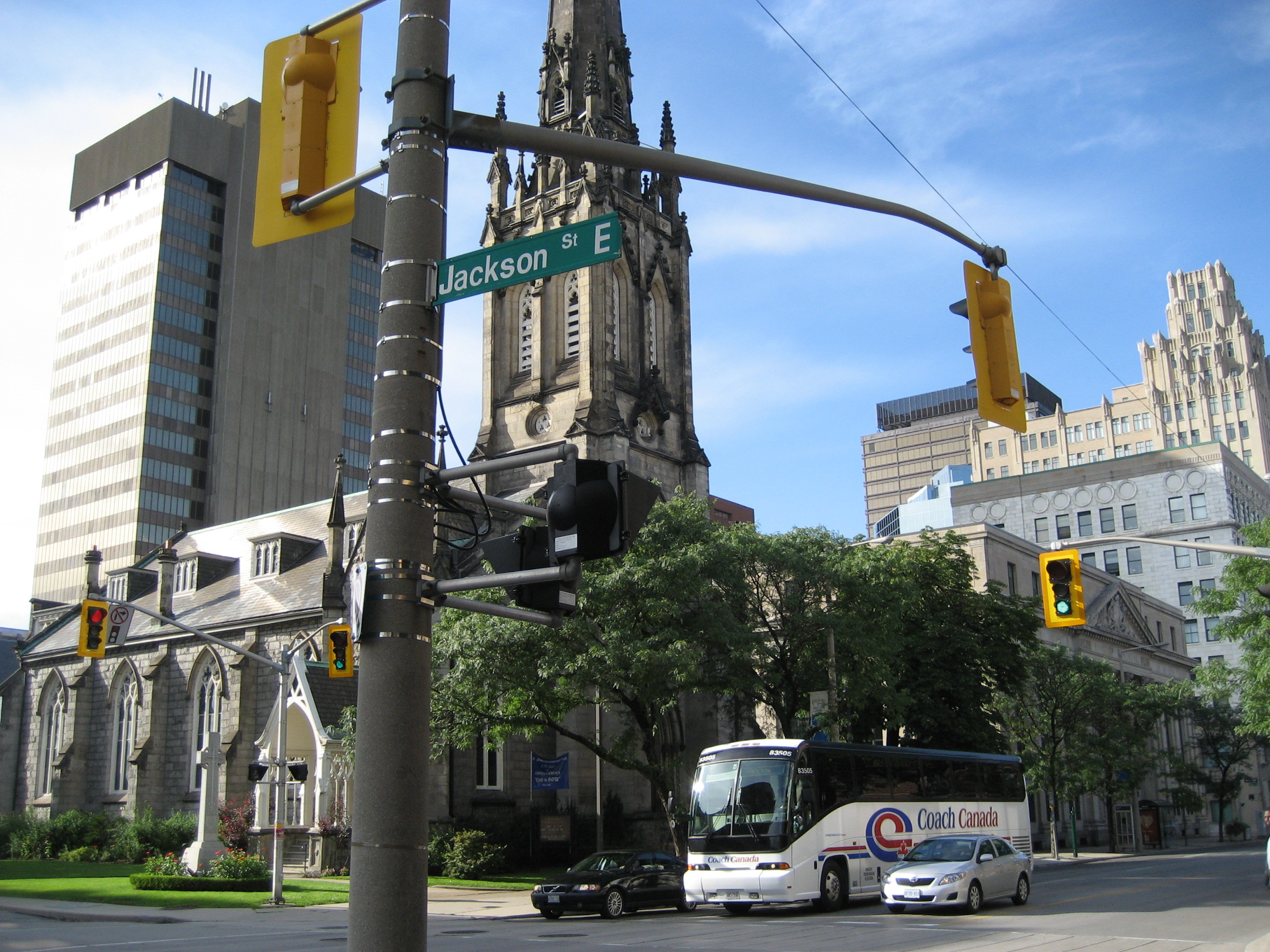
Corner of Jackson and James Streets

Jackson Street, is a Lower City collector road in Hamilton, Ontario, Canada. It starts off West of Locke Street South at Jackson Playground as a one-way street (Westbound) up to Queen Street South where it then switches over to a two-way street and is interrupted at Bay Street South the site of the Hamilton City Hall and the Canadian Football Hall of Fame (museum), resumes again East of the property on MacNab Street South and then ends at Wellington Street South.

== History ==
Jackson Street is named after Edward Jackson, (1799–1872), tinware manufacturer. Originally Jackson Street was called Tyburn Street and later Maiden Lane. It is now named after Edward Jackson.

CHCH TV 11 began broadcasting in 1954 as a CBC affiliate from a transmitter located at 481 First Road West in Stoney Creek. At the time, all private stations were required to be CBC affiliates. The CHCH Television Tower is a 357.5 metre-high guyed TV mast which is the primary transmitter for television station CHCH-TV. When it was built in 1960, the CHCH Television Tower became the tallest structure in Canada. In 1961, CHCH disaffiliated from the CBC and became an independent TV station. In 1974, CHCH TV 11 was first in the world with the television premiere of The Godfather.

Hamilton is also home to the Canadian Football Hall of Fame museum. The museum hosts an annual induction event in a week-long celebration that includes school visits, a golf tournament, a formal induction dinner and concludes with the Hall of Fame game involving the local CFL Hamilton Tiger-Cats at Ivor Wynne Stadium.

== Landmarks ==
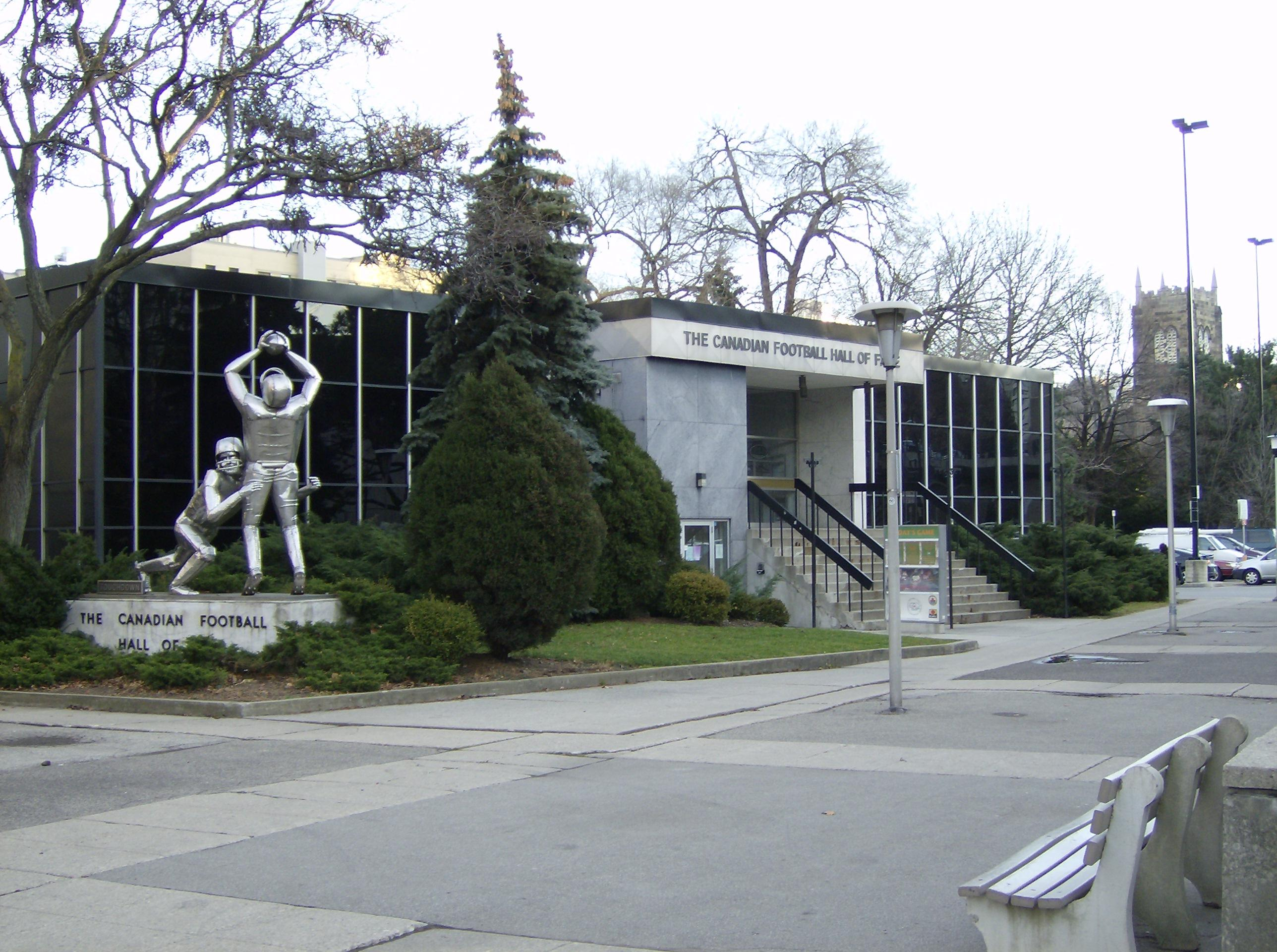
The Canadian Football Hall of Fame

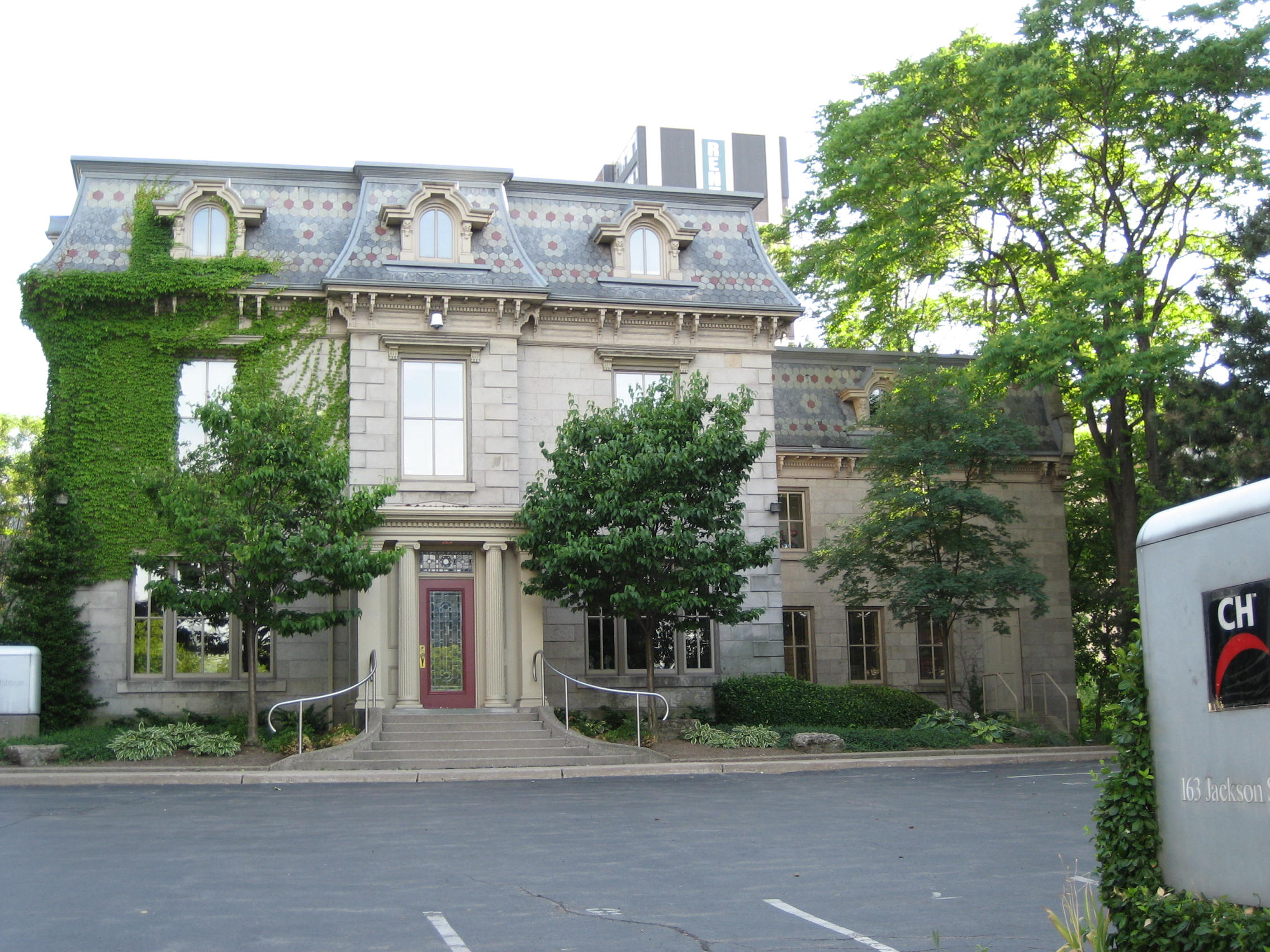
CH TV 11 Studios, just West of Hess Street South

Note: Listing of Landmarks from West to East.

- Jackson Playground
- Locke Street Shopping district (Antique shops, Art galleries, Cafes & fine dining Restaurants)
- CHCH-TV 11 Studios
- old Bell Telephone building converted to lofts.
- Bay 200, residential apartment building (Hamilton's 10th-tallest building)
- Hamilton City Hall (back end)
- Canadian Football Hall of Fame (museum)
- Downtown YWCA
- Whitehern (museum)
- Downtown YMCA
- James Street South Shopping District
- Hamilton Courthouse (back-end)
- United International Laborers Union of North America building
- New Horizon Office Building (Tailgate Charlie's restaurant/ bar)

== Communities ==
Note: Listing of neighbourhoods from West to East.

- Kirkendall
- Durand
- Corktown
