= Transportation in Hamilton, Ontario =

Transportation infrastructure located in Hamilton, Ontario

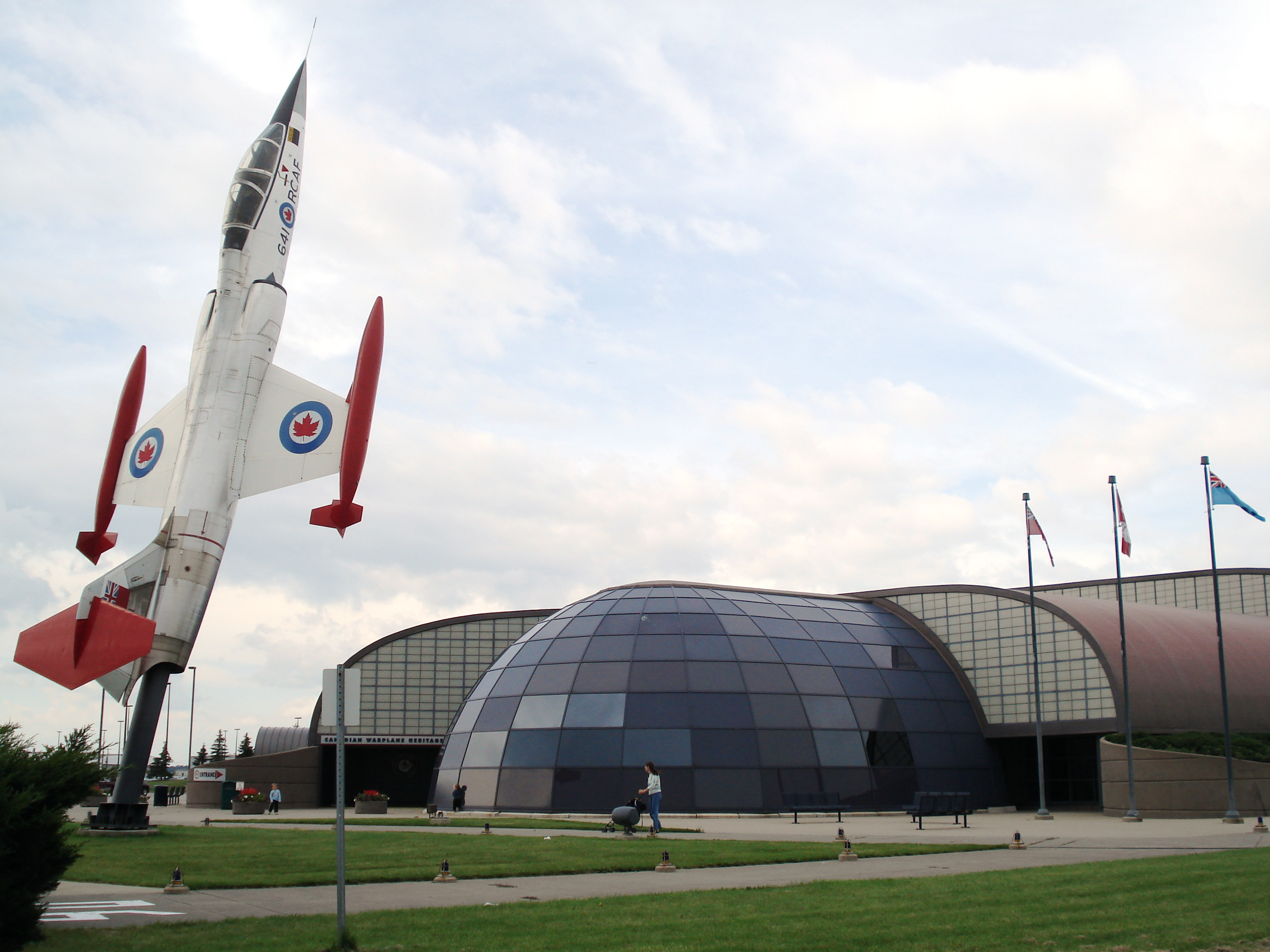
The Canadian Warplane Heritage Museum.

Transport in Hamilton, Ontario consists of a variety of modes.

== Air ==
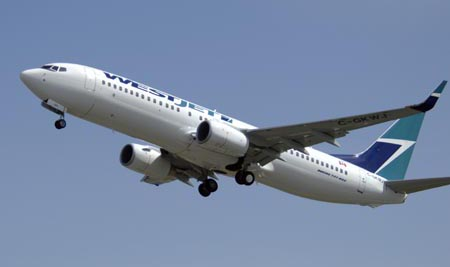
A departing WestJet Boeing 737-800

John C. Munro Hamilton International Airport, located on the tip of Hamilton Mountain at Mount Hope in the former Glanbrook Township, is the busiest air cargo hub in Canada. WestJet, for several years up until 2010 used the airport as their primary point of access to Southern Ontario over the more expensive Toronto Pearson International Airport. The airport is a major lower-cost alternative to Pearson for cargo air service. It is also home to the Canadian Warplane Heritage Museum. Currently the Airport needs 10 km^{2} of new employment land to handle its growth for the next 25 years; farmland around the airport is the best option available. A report by Hemson Consulting says the city will need greenfields the size of the Royal Botanical Gardens on which to locate businesses that will generate an estimated 59,000 jobs by 2031. Aerotropolis, a proposed 10.5 km^{2} industrial park at Highway 6 and 403, has been a hotly debated issue at Hamilton City Hall for years. Opponents feel the city needs to do more investigation about the cost to taxpayers before embarking on the project.

== Rail ==
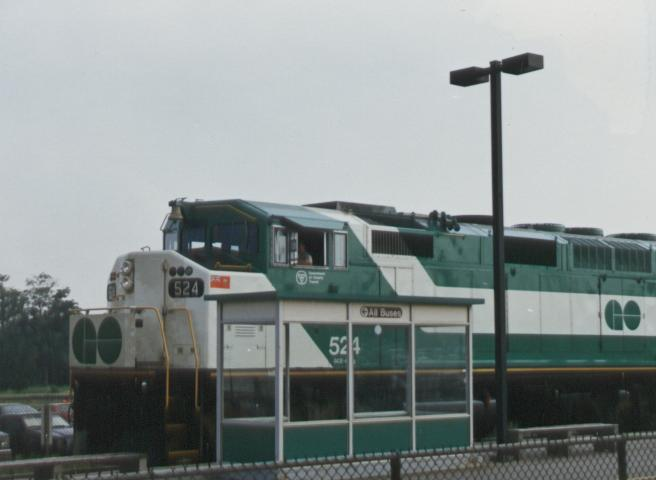
A GO Train F59PH.

Canadian National Railways (CN) serves Hamilton for lifting and setting off traffic for the Rail America (Southern Ontario Railway Shortline), but as heavy industry declined and the preferred mode of transportation changed to road, the number of branch lines and feeder tracks has declined dramatically. Until the early 1970s, the Toronto, Hamilton and Buffalo Railway offered passenger service. Since the late 1980s, GO Transit has offered sporadic passenger train service from its James Street North station. In the late 1990s, GO Transit operations were consolidated at the refurbished Art Deco building on Hunter Street which formerly served the Toronto, Hamilton and Buffalo service. GO trains and buses serve a population of six million in an 8,000 km^{2} area (3,000 sq.mi.) radiating from Downtown Toronto to Hamilton and Guelph in the west; Orangeville, Barrie, and Beaverton to the north; and Port Perry, Oshawa, and Newcastle in the east. The buses extend GO's service as far as over 100 km (about 60 miles) from Downtown Toronto. GO connects with every municipal transit system in the Greater Toronto and Hamilton areas, including the Toronto Transit Commission (TTC). The TH&B station retains its name today, at the GO Transit network located in the heart of Hamilton's downtown core. The nearest Via Rail Canada station is at Aldershot GO Station in west Burlington.

== Bus ==
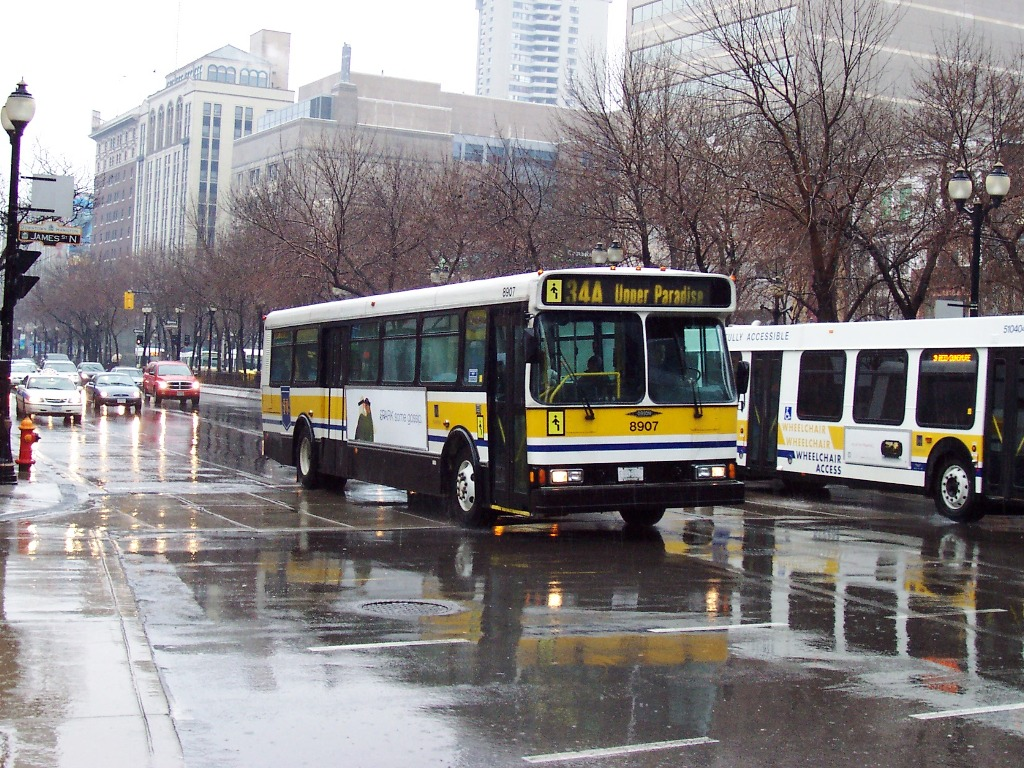
Hamilton Street Railway Bus, corner of King & James Streets

Hamilton has good bus connections with cities in southern Ontario. GO Transit offers frequent and reliable express bus service to Toronto, now from Hamilton GO Centre and formerly from Rebecca Street.

Within the city, the Hamilton Street Railway offers good service in the lower city (especially on east-west routes), reduced service on the Mountain and skeletal service outside the old city of Hamilton (except for Dundas, which is served about as well as the Mountain). The name is a legacy of the days when the majority of public transit vehicles were streetcars. HSR also operated a trolley bus system from 1950 to 1992. The present-day Hamilton Street Railway is in fact built around bus services. Burlington Transit also serves Burlington via York Boulevard and the former Highway 2, and HSR connects downtown Burlington under the Burlington Skyway Bridge.

== Highways and expressways ==
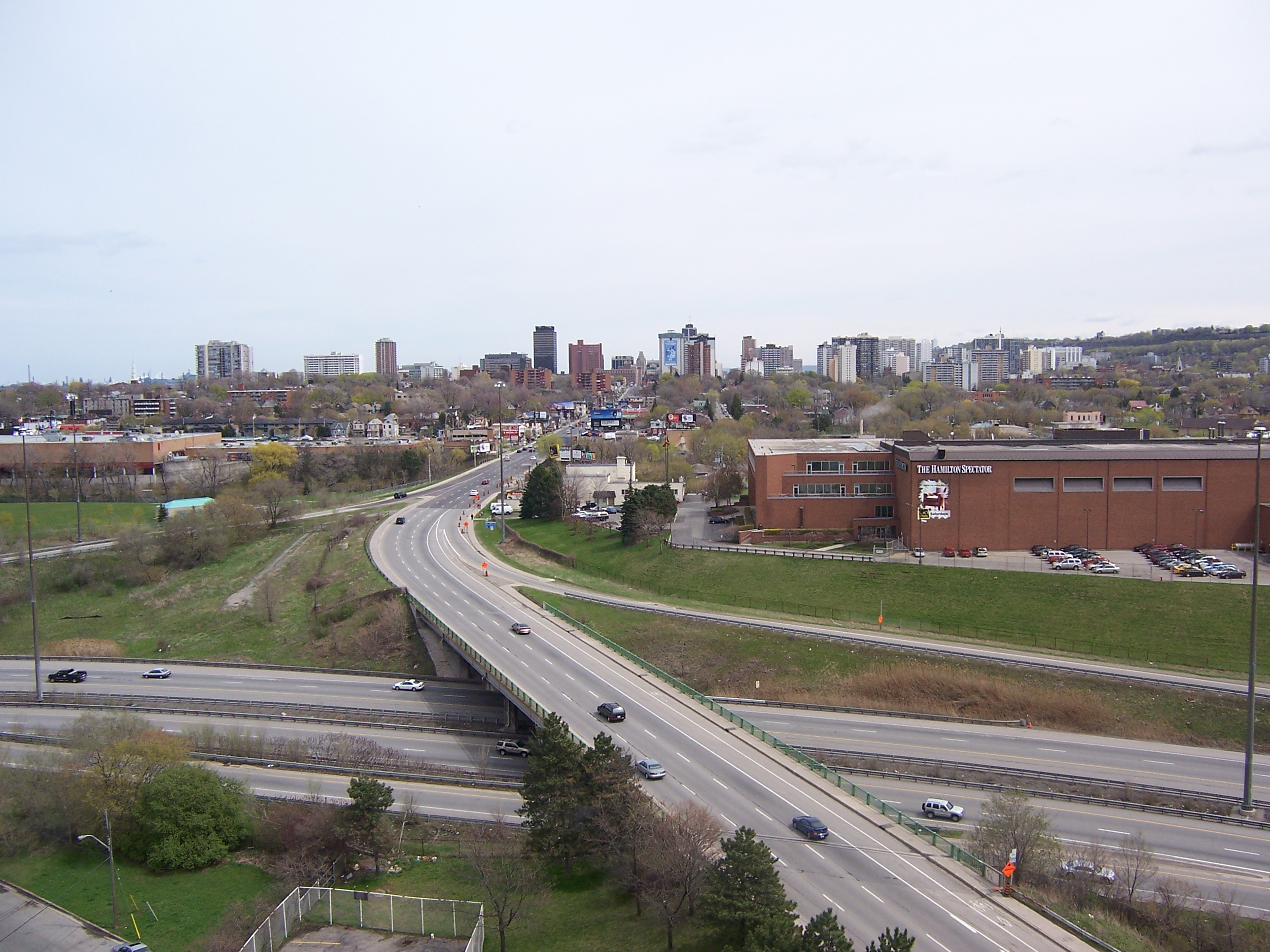
Hamilton facing east, Main Street West overlaps Highway 403

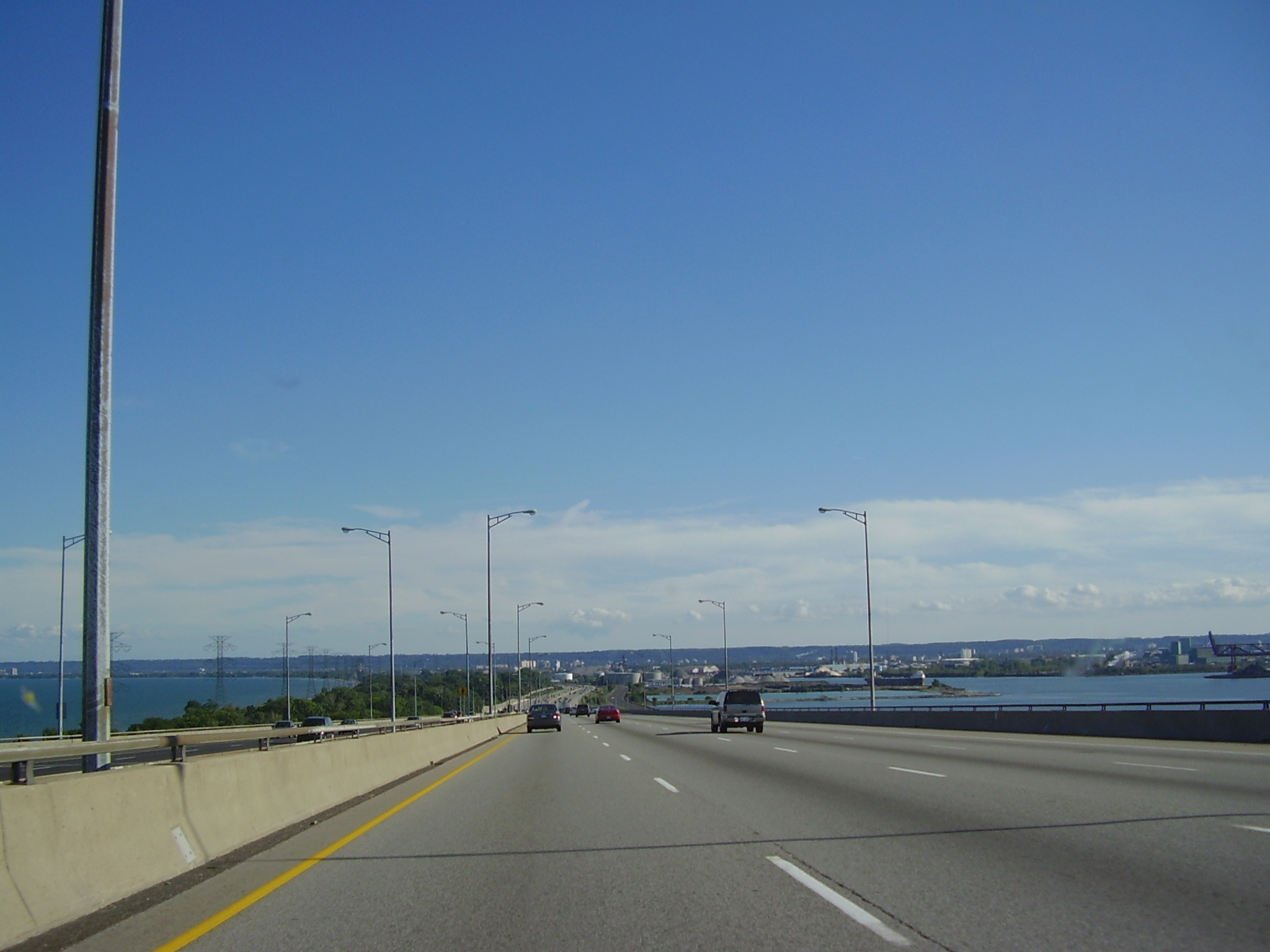
Burlington Bay James N. Allan Skyway Bridge section.

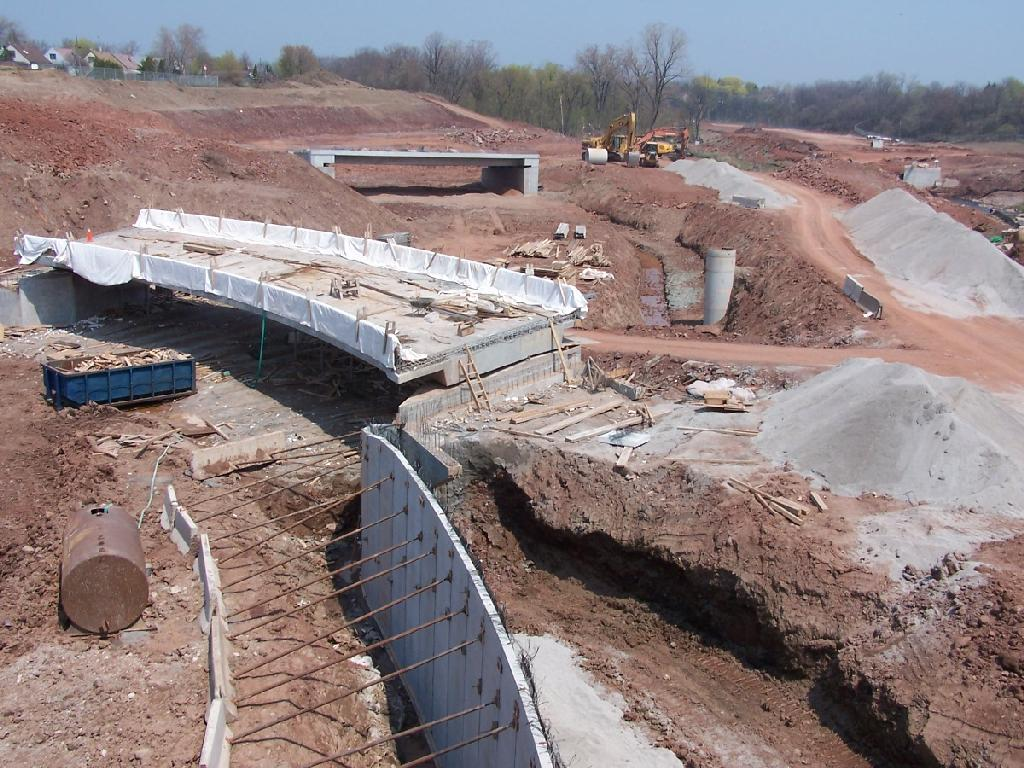
The Red Hill Valley Parkway under construction in May 2005. Officially opened for traffic November 17, 2007.

The following controlled access highways and expressways serve Hamilton, Ontario:

- Queen Elizabeth Way, north Hamilton and Stoney Creek
- Highway 403, Ancaster and west Hamilton
- Highway 2, various streets, including York Boulevard and Dundurn Street.
- Highway 5, decommissioned in 1997 by the Ontario Government. Currently runs from Highway 6 at Clappison's Corners, north.
- Highway 6, Flamborough, Hamilton and Glanbrook, including access to John C. Munro Hamilton International Airport
- Highway 8, Dundas (Cootes Drive), Hamilton and Stoney Creek
- Highway 20, East Hamilton
- Highway 53, Rymal Road, Hamilton
- Lincoln M. Alexander Parkway, ‘The LINC,' Mountain
- Red Hill Valley Parkway, Joins the LINC with the QEW, East Hamilton
- Burlington Street (upper deck), north Hamilton

== City streets ==
All of the old city of Hamilton is on a broken great grid pattern, with major north-south streets spaced approximately one half-mile apart and major east-west streets generally spaced six tenths of a mile apart - thus enclosing 160 acre concessions. Great grid streets on the Mountain bear the name of their lower city counterparts with the prefix "Upper" except for Garth Street, which would be Upper Dundurn Street if the pattern held.

East-west streets on the central and east Mountain are pretty regular, while those in the lower city (especially major ones) and west Mountain are very irregular. King and Main Streets run approximately parallel to one another though they intersect at The Delta. They are usually one-way streets in opposite directions, so they are best conceptualized as a single very wide boulevard and are envied by other Ontario cities for their usually efficient flow of traffic.

However, some contend that the very efficiency that makes driving easy discourages pedestrian street life and hurts downtown businesses. Streets that have recently converted from one-way to two-way, like James Street North, have enjoyed a resurgence in local business, reinvestment in buildings, and improving economic activity.

Mountain Accesses in the city of Hamilton include the following:

- Beckett’s Drive (Queen Street Access)
- Claremont Access
- Highway 403
- Highway 20
- James Street Access
- Jolley Cut, named after James Jolley, (1813–1892), saddler, harnessmaker, politician who funded construction of the Jolley Cut.
- Kenilworth Access
- Sherman Access
- Upper Centennial Parkway

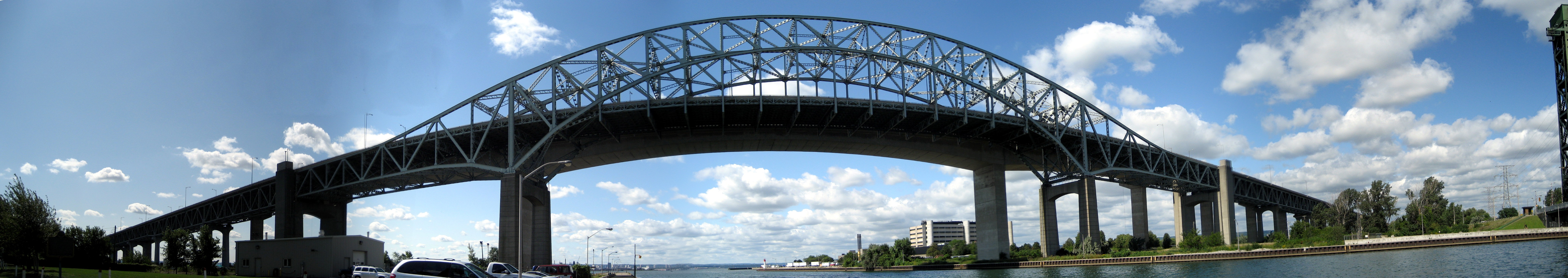
Panoramic view of Burlington Bay James N. Allan Skyway Bridge near Beach Boulevard.

== Bridges ==
There are 389 Bridges and culverts in Hamilton including 25 bridges being built for the Red Hill Valley Parkway. Total Replacement value is more than $350-million. Hamilton has the second largest number of municipal bridges in Ontario. Up to $6-million is spent annually on bridge projects.

22-point inspections (including the deck, hand railings, expansion joints, approaches and substructure) are conducted every two years by engineering firms. The Mary Street bridge is closed to vehicle traffic and will become a pedestrian bridge once a Ferguson Avenue bridge is completed. The Ray Street pedestrian bridge north of Hunter Street was closed after an inspection.

As of 8 January 2007, Dundurn Street South is closed between Main Street West and Hill Street until the end of June 2007 while Canadian Pacific Railway replaces the bridge nearest Main Street. The city of Hamilton and CPR are splitting the $2.2-million cost. On June 27, 2007, One half of the Aberdeen Avenue bridge over Highway 403 was closed for emergency repairs because a hole appeared in the deck.

On July 25, 2008, a newly constructed bridge opened up on Ferguson Avenue North, just north of Barton Street East, to Simcoe Street East. This part of Ferguson was separated by CN railway tracks and better connects the downtown to Hamilton's waterfront. The $4.6 million construction project began in November 2006 and includes one lane of traffic in each direction, bicycle lanes and sidewalks. This project is also in line with Hamilton’s recently adopted Transportation Master Plan which emphasizes enhanced cycling and walking facilities and an efficient road network to support economic development. This construction project received federal funding through the Federal Gas Tax Fund.

== See also ==
- Hamilton Street Railway
- Metrolinx
