= Public transport in Hamilton =

Public transport in Hamilton may refer to:

- Transportation in Hamilton, Ontario
- Public transport in Hamilton, Waikato
