= Geography of Hamilton, Ontario =

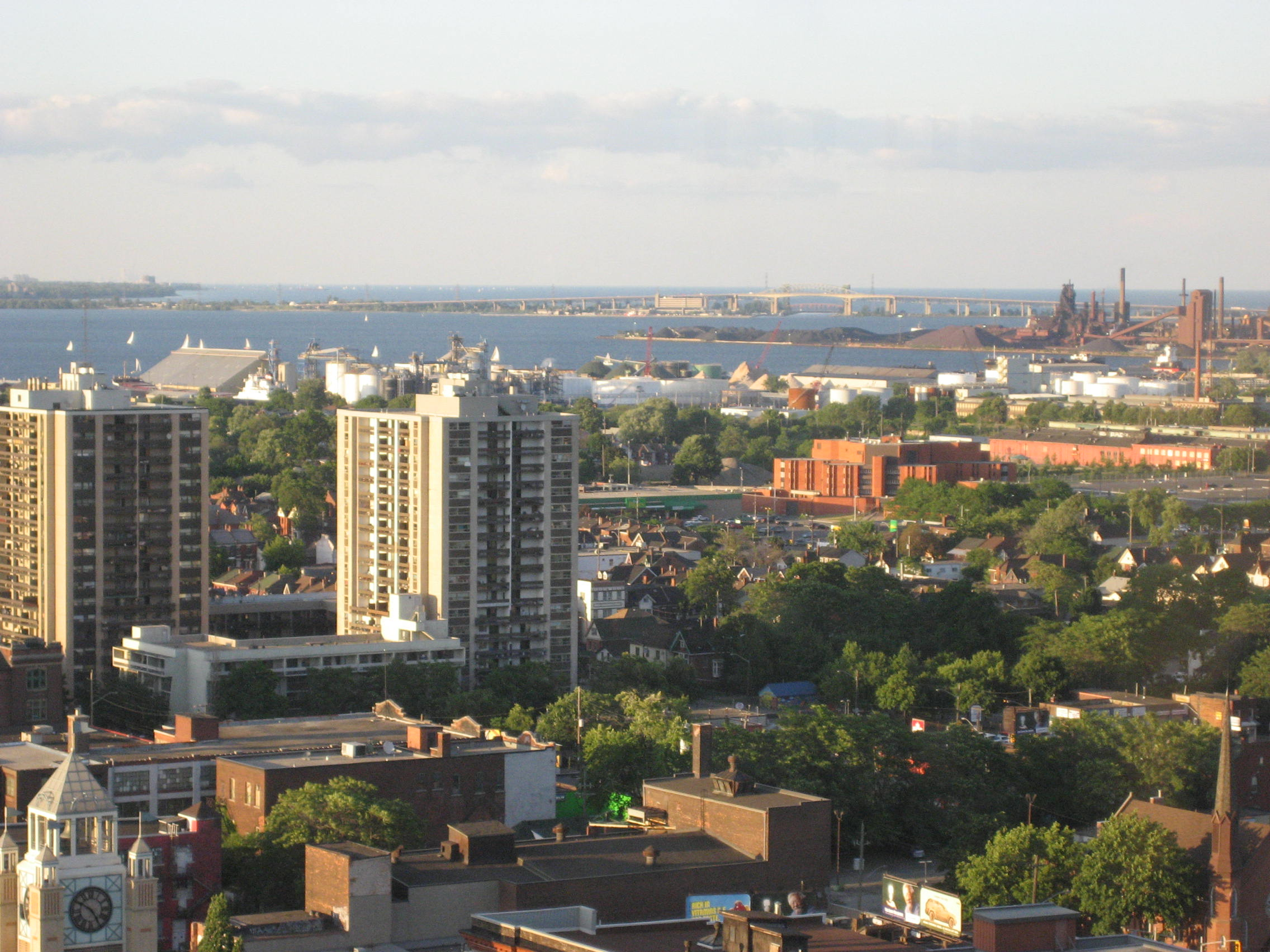
North End, view from atop of Stelco Tower

Hamilton is located on the western end of the Niagara Peninsula and wraps around the westernmost part of the Lake Ontario. Most of the city including the downtown section lies along the south shore. Situated in the geographic centre of the Golden Horseshoe, it lies roughly midway between Toronto and Buffalo. The two major physical features are Hamilton Harbour marking the northern limit of the city and the Niagara Escarpment running through the middle of the city across its entire breadth, bisecting the city into 'upper' and 'lower' parts.

According to records from local historians, this district was called "Attawandaronia" by the native Neutral people. Hamilton is one of 11 cities showcased in the book, "Green City: People, Nature & Urban Places" by Quebec author Mary Soderstrom, which examines the city as an example of an industrial powerhouse co-existing with nature. Soderstrom credits Thomas McQuesten and family in the 1930s who "became champions of parks, greenspace and roads" in Hamilton.

Hamilton Harbour is a natural harbour with a large sandbar called the Beachstrip. This sandbar was deposited during a period of higher lake levels during the last ice age, and extends southeast through the central lower city to the escarpment. Hamilton's deep sea port is accessed by ship canal through the Beachstrip into the harbour, the canal being traversed by two bridges, the QEW's Burlington Bay James N. Allan Skyway and the lower Canal Lift Bridge.

Between 1788 and 1793, the townships at the Head-of-the-Lake were surveyed and named. The area was first known as The Head-of-the-Lake for its location at the western end of Lake Ontario. John Ryckman, born in Barton township (where present day downtown Hamilton is), described the area in 1803 as he remembered it: "The city in 1803 was all forest. The shores of the bay were difficult to reach or see because they were hidden by a thick, almost impenetrable mass of trees and undergrowth...Bears ate pigs, so settlers warred on bears. Wolves gobbled sheep and geese, so they hunted and trapped wolves. They also held organized raids on rattlesnakes on the mountainside. There was plenty of game. Many a time have I seen a deer jump the fence into my back yard, and there were millions of pigeons which we clubbed as they flew low."

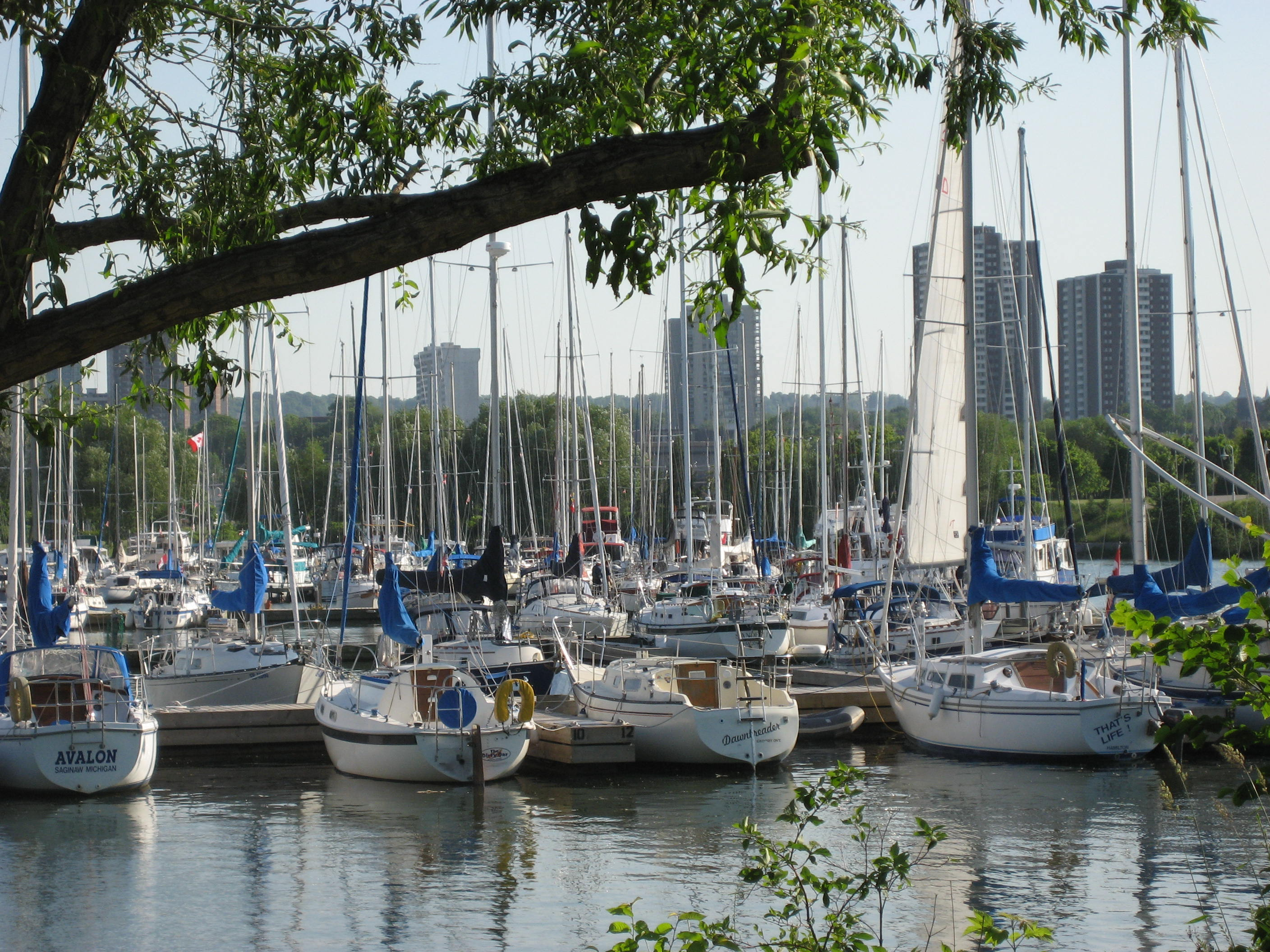
Bayfront Park

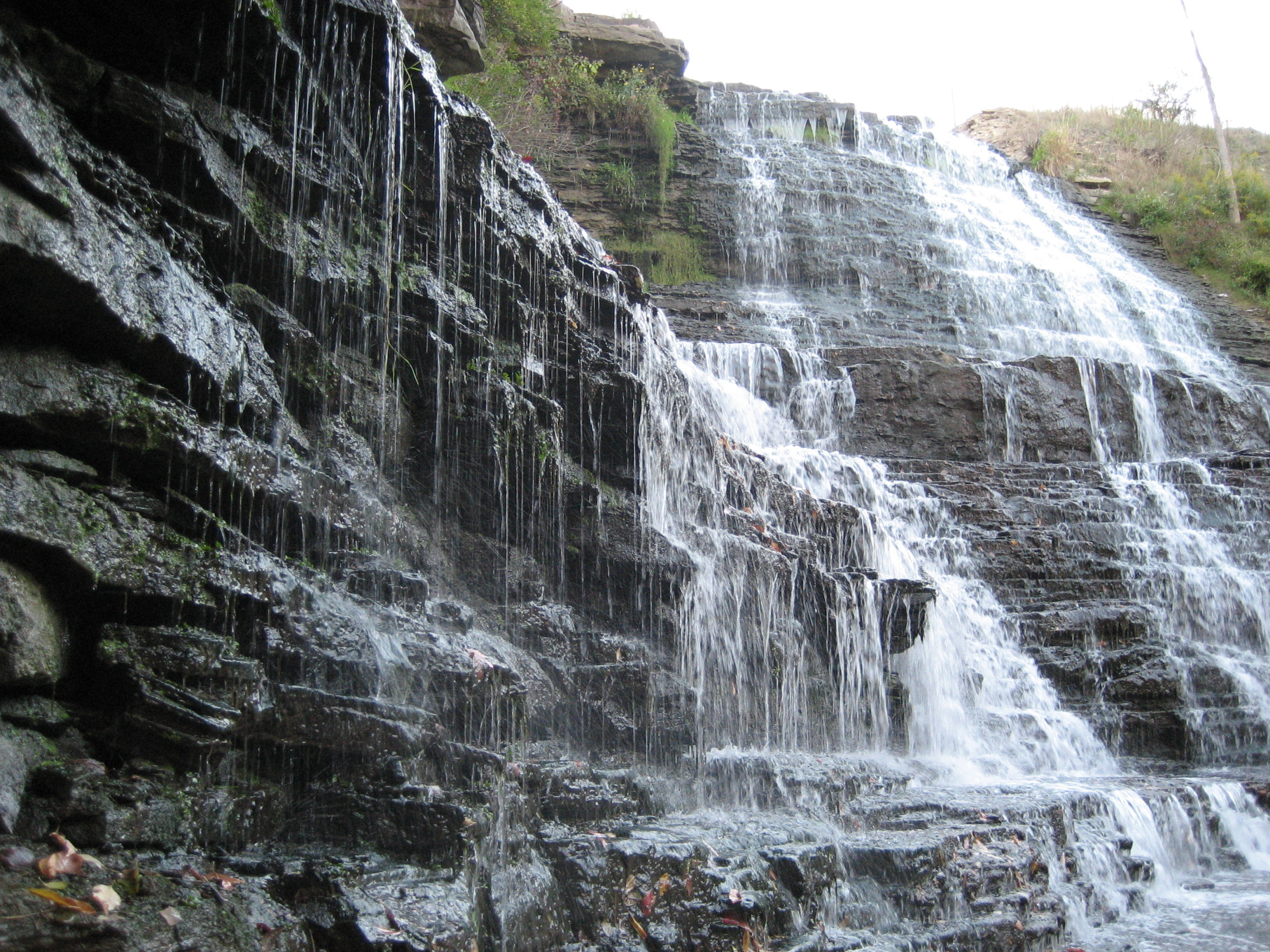
Albion Falls

George Hamilton, a settler and local politician, established a town site in the northern portion of Barton Township in 1815. He kept several east–west roads which were originally Indian trails, but the north–south streets were on a regular grid pattern. Streets were designated "East" or "West" if they crossed James Street or Highway 6. Streets were designated "North" or "South" if they crossed King Street or Highway 8. The overall design of the townsite, likely conceived in 1816, was commonplace. George Hamilton employed a grid street pattern used in most towns in Upper Canada and throughout the American frontier. The eighty original lots had frontages of fifty feet; each lot faced a broad street and backed onto a twelve-foot lane. It took at least a decade for all of the original lots to be sold, but the construction of the Burlington Canal in 1823, and a new court-house in 1827 encouraged Hamilton to add more blocks around 1828–9. At this time, he included a market square in an effort to draw commercial activity onto his lands, but the natural growth of the town was to the north of Hamilton's plot.

The Hamilton Conservation Authority owns, leases or manages about 4,500 hectares (11,100 acres) of land with the City operating 1,077 hectares (2,661 acres) of parkland at 310 locations. Many of the parks are located along the Niagara Escarpment, which runs from Tobermory at the tip of the Bruce Peninsula in the north, to Queenston at the Niagara River in the south, and provides views of the cities and towns at the western end of Lake Ontario. The hiking path Bruce Trail runs the length of the escarpment. Hamilton is home to more than 100 waterfalls and cascades, most of which are on or near the Bruce Trail as it winds through the Niagara Escarpment.

== Bay/Harbour ==
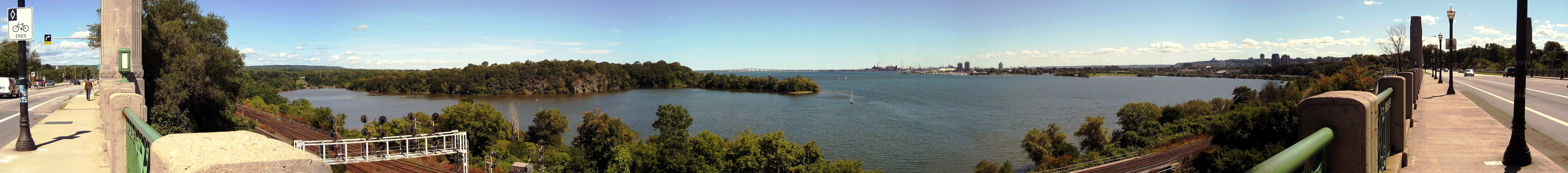
Panoramic view of Hamilton Harbour from T.B. McQuesten High Level Bridge on York Boulevard, near Harvey Park.

Burlington Bay is a natural harbour with a large sandbar called the Beachstrip. The first aboriginals to settle in the Hamilton area called this bay Macassa, meaning "beautiful waters". This sandbar was deposited during a period of higher lake levels during the last ice age, and extends southeast through the central lower city to the escarpment. Hamilton's deep sea port is accessed by ship canal through the beach strip into the harbour and is traversed by two bridges, the QEW's Burlington Bay - James N. Allan Skyway and the lower Canal Lift Bridge. Hamilton Harbour ranks one of Canada's largest seaports. The Hamilton Port Authority manages the heavily industrial harbour.

Hamilton Harbour Fast Facts:

- Mean depth: 13 metres
- Maximum depth: 25 metres
- Watershed area: 500 square kilometres
- Shoreline length: 45 kilometres
- Volume of water: 2.8 x 10 to 8th cubic feet (7.9 million m³) of water
- Reduction in surface area from 1926 to 1982: 22%
- Navigational season is from April through to mid December

== City and suburbs ==
Downtown began and remains around Gore Park and the intersection of King and James Streets. Central Hamilton extends from the base of the Mountain north to Barton Street, west to Chedoke Creek or Dundurn Street, and east to approximately Wentworth Street or Sherman Avenues. West Hamilton or the west end begins at Dundurn Street or Chedoke Creek. East Hamilton or the east end begins at approximately Ottawa Street or Kenilworth Avenue. North Hamilton or the north end begins at Barton Street or the Canadian National Railways (CN) tracks.

As city limits expanded to include the Mountain, the retronym for the city below the Escarpment became the Lower City (now often just referred to as downtown). The east/west divide line for the mountain is Upper James Street, and the east/west divide line for downtown is James Street. The south Mountain begins at approximately Limeridge Road or the Lincoln M. Alexander Expressway.

The former boroughs of Hamilton-Wentworth Region, are: Stoney Creek, Dundas, Flamborough, Ancaster and Township of Glanbrook. They have maintained their names as wards in the amalgamated city.

Hamilton, like many cities, is broken up into several areas, well known to the local residents. Some 'sections' of the city include: Ainslie Wood, The North End, Downtown, the East and West End, Westdale (the area where McMaster University is located, and therefore has a high percentage of students), Beasley, Crown Point, McQuesten, Stinson, Locke, Dundas, Ancaster (including Meadowlands, which is often seen as separate from Ancaster), the West, Central, and East Mountain, Stoney Creek and Stoney Creek Mountain. These areas are all unique, and the people, economy and cultures vary a great deal across the city.

== Escarpment and glacial geomorphology ==
The Niagara Escarpment in Hamilton is a vertical wall of limestone, sandstone and shale that runs through southern Ontario from western New York to the Wisconsin/Illinois border. The Hamilton portion, in many places 100 m (330') tall, is commonly referred to as "the Mountain" by locals. On average the Hamilton Mountain is 4–5 km inland from the Lake Ontario shoreline and at its edge affords views of the city and harbour. The number of waterfalls within the City of Hamilton limits have recently inspired local tourism interests to market Hamilton as the "City of Waterfalls". More than 100 waterfalls and cascades flow over Hamilton Mountain within city limits, including Stoney Creek, Red Hill Creek, Grindstone Creek, Spencer Gorge Waterfall and Chedoke Creek, which flows into the Hamilton Harbour and most of which can be found along the Bruce Trail.

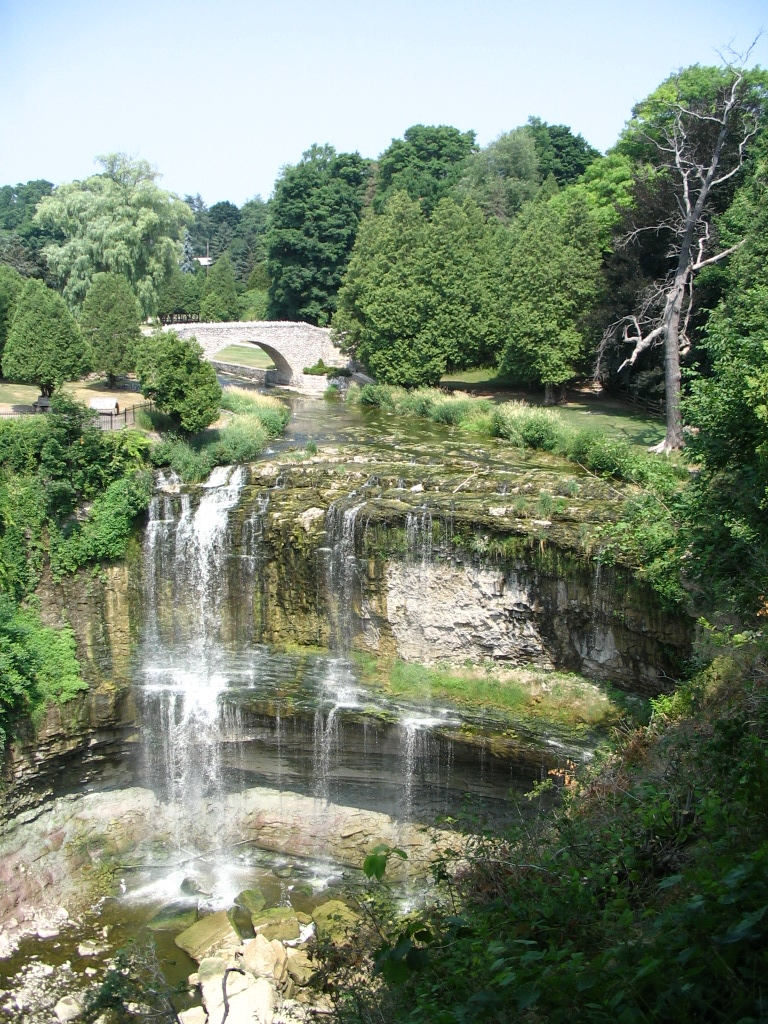
Webster's Falls

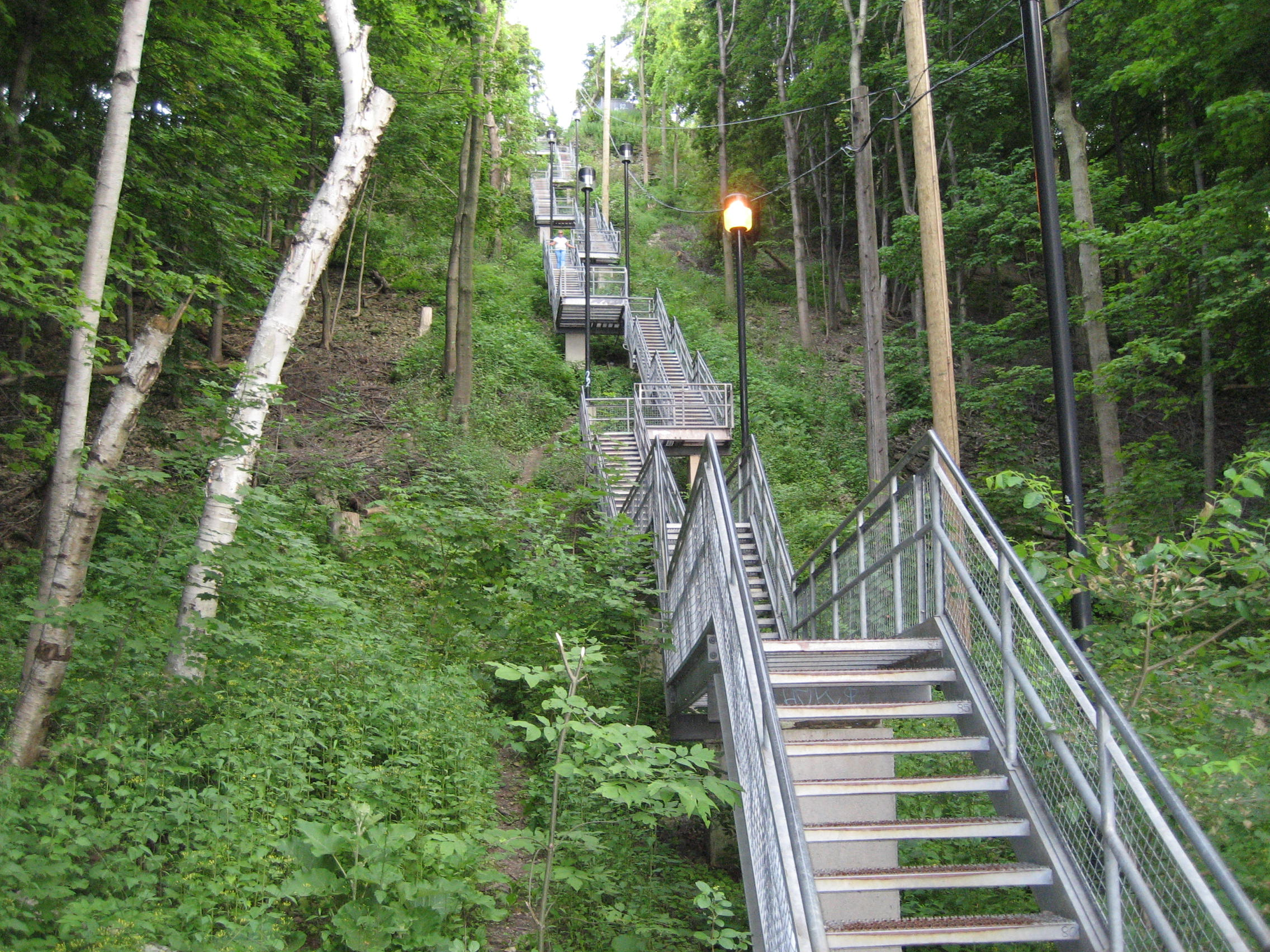
Dundurn Street South, Mountain-access stairway

During the Ordovician period, the Michigan Basin was under a shallow, tropical sea. Muds and sands were deposited from erosion of the Taconic Mountains to the south, creating the base shale and sandstone units of the Niagara Escarpment. Later, during Silurian period, the Taconic Mountains stopped uplifting, erosion slowed, and calcium carbonate sediments formed, creating the upper limestone and dolomite beds of the Escarpment. Fossils such as sponges, crinoids, brachiopods and rugose corals, indicating warm tropical waters, can be found in the Escarpment. There were fish, a species of shark, but none of their remains have been found in this district. The limestone layer of rock found here becomes thicker as one goes northward. At Manitoulin Island it is 200 feet (61 m) thick, suggesting that the water must have been shallower in Hamilton.

The shale layer underlying the limestone in the Escarpment allows for its perpendicularity; the soft shale wears away more rapidly than limestone and thus the top layer always stays out farther than the part below.

The Dundas Valley is a glacial re-entrant valley, formed by several advances and retreats of an ice lobe. A thick layer of glacial and post-glacial deposits is found on the valley floor. Glacial geomorphological features such as kame moraines and kettles are present.

During the last glacial retreat, a large lake called Lake Iroquois was in the approximate location of Lake Ontario. It was likely formed as a result of ice damming in the St. Lawrence River. The lake laid down glaciolacustrine sediments such as sand and clay in the lower city and created the beach bar between Cootes Paradise and Hamilton Harbour.

In 1857, when the Great Western railroad made the present opening for the Desjardins Canal, the bones of a mammoth were found. In 1931, they found the antlers of an elk in a gravel pit near Locke Street South.

Soil in Hamilton is predominately derived from glacial drift (glaciolacustrine sediments in the lower city; glacial tills in the upper city) and from limestone and shale erosion.

== Parks ==
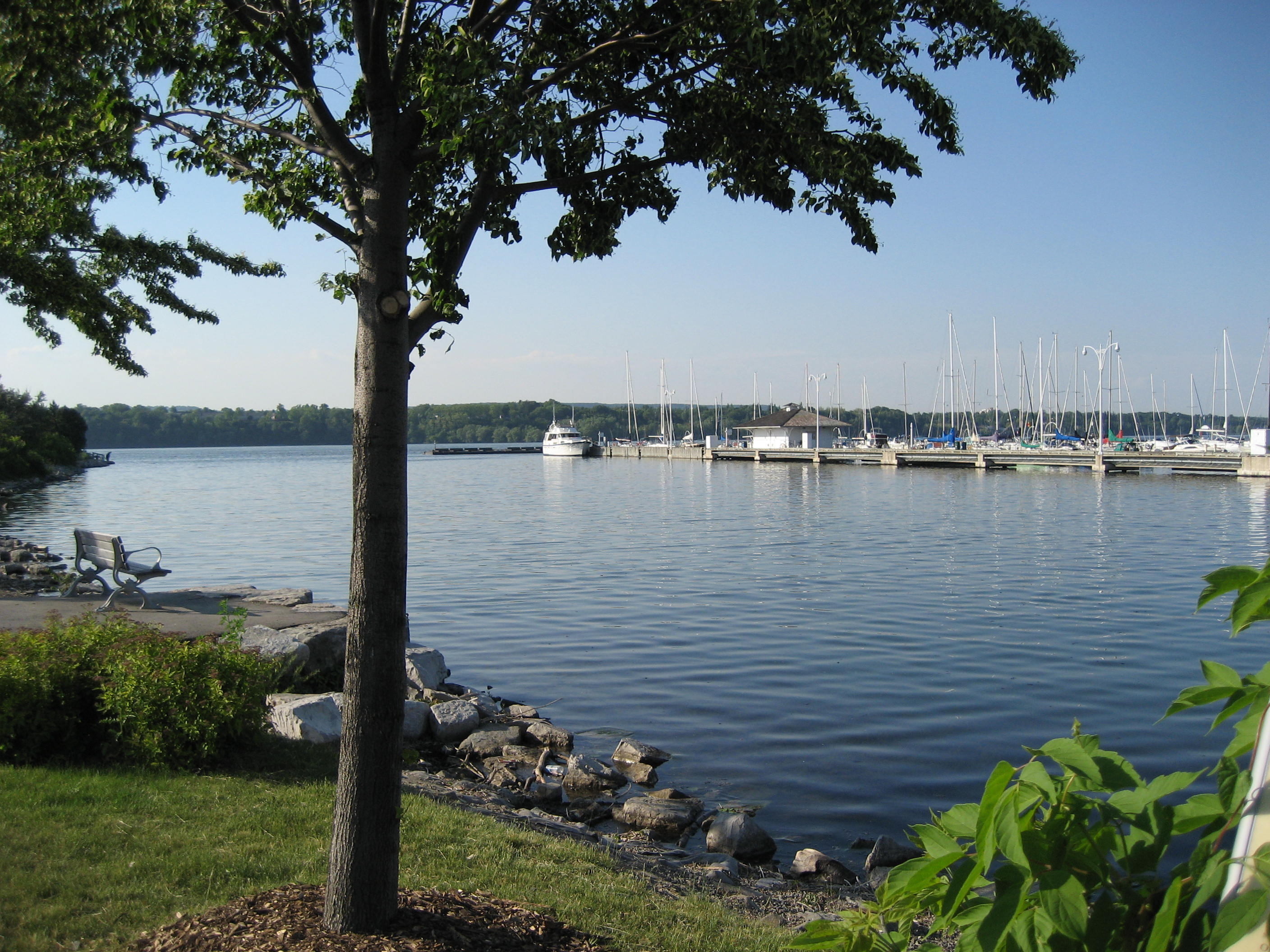
Pier 4 Park

Acting on provisions of the Public Parks Act of 1883, the voters of Hamilton, on 8 January 1900, endorsed a by-law establishing the Board of Parks Management, an independent body whose members were appointed for three-year terms. The need for the new organization was obvious as when it began there were only three formal parklands at the disposal of residents in the community; the Gore, acquired by the city in 1852, Dundurn, which was appropriated by the City in 1899, and Victoria Park on King Street West, which by this time had lost an imposing landmark, the Crystal Palace. From then on other parks were opened in town because of the efforts of the group. These include, (in chronological order); Mountain Drive (1905), Beulah (1908), Stewart & LaSalle (1912), Delta (1914), Gage (1917), whose Rose Garden attracted tourists province-wide, Scott (1919), which eventually became the future home of Civic Stadium (Ivor Wynne Stadium), Parkdale & Chedoke (1925), Ainslie Woods (1927), King's Forest, Mahoney, and Donohue (1929), Bruce (1936), and Mount Hamilton (1939). 3,000 acres (12 km^{2}) altogether were acquired and developed by the Board in the span of a half a century.

The City's Parks Board drew up plans in 1927 for the construction of a full-scale botanical gardens. By 1930 work had started on the project which converted a stone quarry into a horticultural showcase, known as the Royal Botanical Gardens. A decade later a bill was introduced in the Provincial Legislature calling for an even more ambitious project which when completed would become the "Mecca of flower lovers from all parts of North America" its supporters claimed. The sponsor of the legislation was the Minister of Highways in the Provincial Government, and native Hamiltonian, T.B. McQuesten.

== Climate ==
Climate data for Hamilton, Ontario (Royal Botanical Gardens) Climate ID: 6153300; coordinates 43°17′N 79°53′W; elevation: 102.10 m (335.0 ft); 1981−2010 normals, extremes 1866−present (Note: Based on station coordinates provided by Environment and Climate Change Canada, climate data for was recorded near downtown Hamilton from January 1866 to August 1958, and April 1950 to present at the Royal Botanical Gardens.)
Month	Jan	Feb	Mar	Apr	May	Jun	Jul	Aug	Sep	Oct	Nov	Dec	Year
Record high °C (°F)	18.3 (64.9)	18.8 (65.8)	27.2 (81.0)	31.1 (88.0)	36.1 (97.0)	38.9 (102.0)	41.1 (106.0)	38.9 (102.0)	37.8 (100.0)	32.2 (90.0)	26.1 (79.0)	21.2 (70.2)	41.1 (106.0)
Mean daily maximum °C (°F)	−0.9 (30.4)	0.1 (32.2)	4.8 (40.6)	11.7 (53.1)	18.6 (65.5)	24.3 (75.7)	27.3 (81.1)	25.9 (78.6)	21.1 (70.0)	14.6 (58.3)	7.7 (45.9)	2.0 (35.6)	13.1 (55.6)
Daily mean °C (°F)	−4.7 (23.5)	−3.9 (25.0)	0.5 (32.9)	7.1 (44.8)	13.3 (55.9)	18.9 (66.0)	22.0 (71.6)	20.9 (69.6)	16.3 (61.3)	10.0 (50.0)	4.1 (39.4)	−1.4 (29.5)	8.6 (47.5)
Mean daily minimum °C (°F)	−8.5 (16.7)	−7.9 (17.8)	−3.8 (25.2)	2.4 (36.3)	7.9 (46.2)	13.4 (56.1)	16.7 (62.1)	15.8 (60.4)	11.4 (52.5)	5.4 (41.7)	0.4 (32.7)	−4.7 (23.5)	4.0 (39.2)
Record low °C (°F)	−30.6 (−23.1)	−29.4 (−20.9)	−28.3 (−18.9)	−14.4 (6.1)	−7.2 (19.0)	−1.1 (30.0)	5.0 (41.0)	1.1 (34.0)	−3.9 (25.0)	−11.1 (12.0)	−22.8 (−9.0)	−27.8 (−18.0)	−30.6 (−23.1)
Average precipitation mm (inches)	56.8 (2.24)	57.2 (2.25)	63.7 (2.51)	73.3 (2.89)	85.5 (3.37)	72.7 (2.86)	82.7 (3.26)	89.7 (3.53)	80.9 (3.19)	71.6 (2.82)	91.3 (3.59)	71.9 (2.83)	897.1 (35.32)
Average rainfall mm (inches)	27.4 (1.08)	26.4 (1.04)	43.3 (1.70)	70.1 (2.76)	85.5 (3.37)	72.7 (2.86)	82.7 (3.26)	89.7 (3.53)	80.9 (3.19)	71.6 (2.82)	83.2 (3.28)	46.8 (1.84)	780.0 (30.71)
Average snowfall cm (inches)	32.4 (12.8)	31.1 (12.2)	18.3 (7.2)	2.8 (1.1)	0.0 (0.0)	0.0 (0.0)	0.0 (0.0)	0.0 (0.0)	0.0 (0.0)	0.0 (0.0)	7.5 (3.0)	26.0 (10.2)	118.1 (46.5)
Average precipitation days (≥ 0.2 mm)	14.7	12.1	12.3	13.5	12.2	10.5	10.7	11.1	12.3	11.8	14.3	13.8	149.1
Average rainy days (≥ 0.2 mm)	5.7	5.0	8.8	12.6	12.2	10.5	10.7	11.1	12.3	11.8	12.8	7.6	120.9
Average snowy days (≥ 0.2 cm)	10.5	8.6	4.9	1.2	0.0	0.0	0.0	0.0	0.0	0.0	2.6	8.4	36.2
Mean monthly sunshine hours	87.2	113.4	152.4	182.2	244.0	279.1	303.5	262.6	177.7	148.6	88.9	71.0	2,110.6
Percentage possible sunshine	30.0	38.3	41.3	45.4	53.7	60.7	65.1	60.7	47.3	43.4	30.4	25.3	45.1
Average ultraviolet index	1	2	4	5	7	8	8	7	6	3	2	1	5
Source 1: Environment and Climate Change Canada
Source 2: Weather Atlas

Climate data for Hamilton (John C. Munro Hamilton International Airport) WMO ID: 71263; coordinates: 43°10′18″N 79°56′03″W; elevation: 237.7 m (780 ft); 1991−2020 normals, extremes 1959–present
Month	Jan	Feb	Mar	Apr	May	Jun	Jul	Aug	Sep	Oct	Nov	Dec	Year
Record high humidex	17.6	18.5	27.7	33.4	40.5	44.4	49.1	47.6	42.1	37.7	26.6	24.5	49.1
Record high °C (°F)	16.7 (62.1)	17.9 (64.2)	26.8 (80.2)	29.7 (85.5)	33.1 (91.6)	35.0 (95.0)	37.4 (99.3)	36.4 (97.5)	34.4 (93.9)	30.3 (86.5)	24.4 (75.9)	20.7 (69.3)	37.4 (99.3)
Mean daily maximum °C (°F)	−1.4 (29.5)	−0.9 (30.4)	4.7 (40.5)	11.8 (53.2)	18.9 (66.0)	24.2 (75.6)	26.6 (79.9)	25.6 (78.1)	21.7 (71.1)	14.5 (58.1)	7.7 (45.9)	1.5 (34.7)	12.9 (55.2)
Daily mean °C (°F)	−5.3 (22.5)	−5 (23)	0.2 (32.4)	6.5 (43.7)	13.1 (55.6)	18.5 (65.3)	20.9 (69.6)	20.1 (68.2)	16.1 (61.0)	9.7 (49.5)	3.8 (38.8)	−1.9 (28.6)	8.1 (46.6)
Mean daily minimum °C (°F)	−9.1 (15.6)	−9.2 (15.4)	−4.4 (24.1)	1.3 (34.3)	7.3 (45.1)	12.8 (55.0)	15.2 (59.4)	14.5 (58.1)	10.5 (50.9)	4.8 (40.6)	−0.2 (31.6)	−5.4 (22.3)	3.2 (37.8)
Record low °C (°F)	−30.0 (−22.0)	−29.1 (−20.4)	−24.6 (−12.3)	−12.8 (9.0)	−3.9 (25.0)	1.1 (34.0)	5.6 (42.1)	1.1 (34.0)	−2.2 (28.0)	−7.8 (18.0)	−19.3 (−2.7)	−26.8 (−16.2)	−30.0 (−22.0)
Record low wind chill	−43.0	−37.0	−30.7	−22.5	−8.0	0.0	0.0	0.0	−4.6	−10.9	−22.8	−33.9	−43.0
Average precipitation mm (inches)	72.9 (2.87)	53.4 (2.10)	68.7 (2.70)	81.3 (3.20)	81.0 (3.19)	77.6 (3.06)	97.5 (3.84)	66.8 (2.63)	73.5 (2.89)	84.2 (3.31)	78.1 (3.07)	67.3 (2.65)	902.3 (35.52)
Average rainfall mm (inches)	36.4 (1.43)	24.5 (0.96)	43.9 (1.73)	73.0 (2.87)	81.0 (3.19)	78.1 (3.07)	97.5 (3.84)	65.5 (2.58)	73.6 (2.90)	83.2 (3.28)	67.7 (2.67)	40.2 (1.58)	764.6 (30.10)
Average snowfall cm (inches)	40.8 (16.1)	35.1 (13.8)	26.5 (10.4)	8.4 (3.3)	0.5 (0.2)	0.0 (0.0)	0.0 (0.0)	0.0 (0.0)	0.0 (0.0)	0.7 (0.3)	11.0 (4.3)	33.5 (13.2)	156.5 (61.6)
Average precipitation days (≥ 0.2 mm)	17.1	13.6	12.9	12.6	12.8	10.7	11.5	10.2	9.8	12.4	13.5	15.4	152.4
Average rainy days (≥ 0.2 mm)	5.9	4.1	7.5	11.4	12.8	10.6	11.5	10.1	9.8	12.3	10.4	7.9	114.2
Average snowy days (≥ 0.2 cm)	14.5	11.6	8.1	2.7	0.10	0.0	0.0	0.0	0.0	0.43	4.8	12.0	54.2
Average relative humidity (%) (at 15:00)	75.1	70.7	65.1	59.6	57.1	57.7	57.5	60.5	61.3	65.3	71.5	75.6	64.8
Source: Environment and Climate Change Canada (snowfall 1981–2010)

Hamilton

Climate chart (precipitation, max. and min. temperature)
J	F	M	A	M	J	J	A	S	O	N	D
60 −1 −9	55 0 −8	76 5 −4	74 12 3	82 19 8	72 24 13	75 27 17	85 26 16	85 21 12	73 14 6	82 8 1	77 2 −5
- █ Average max. and min. temperatures in °C
- █ Precipitation totals in mm
- Source: Environment Canada
Imperial conversion
J	F	M	A	M	J	J	A	S	O	N	D
2.4 30 16	2.2 31 17	3 40 26	2.9 53 38	3.2 65 46	2.8 75 56	3 81 62	3.3 79 61	3.3 70 53	2.9 58 42	3.2 46 33	3 35 23
- █ Average max. and min. temperatures in °F
- █ Precipitation totals in inches

The climate of Hamilton is humid continental (Dfa type) and relatively mild compared with most Canadian cities. The average January temperature is −5 °C (23.0 °F) downtown, but many days rise just above freezing often making for slushy conditions during snowfalls. Winter snowfall averages 126 centimetres (50 in) with great year-to-year variation. The average July temperature is 22 °C (71.6 °F) and humidity is usually high during the peak of summer. Daytime highs in the 30s with humidex making it feel above 40 °C are quite common anytime from May through early October.

The climate of the lower city is in general much more sheltered and milder than on top of the Mountain, which has a shorter growing season and in winter is prone to more wind whipped lake effect snows. Generally the lower city receives less snow than the upper city. The escarpment also greatly affects summer weather; temperature inversions can make the downtown many degrees warmer, particularly at night, and often an inversion will combine with the physical barrier of the escarpment to trap smog in the downtown area, sometimes reducing downtown visibility to less than 2 km.

Summer rains can be heavy but in general severe weather is rare. One notable exception was a late season tornado that occurred November 9, 2005 damaging hundreds of houses and lifted off Lawfield Middle School's gymnasium roof on the Hamilton Mountain, injuring two students and leaving the school structurally unsound. Environment Canada confirmed an F1 tornado struck the area; this was one of the latest dates in any year that a confirmed tornado touched down in Canada.
