= Hamilton GO Centre =

Commuter rail station in Hamilton, Ontario, Canada

Hamilton
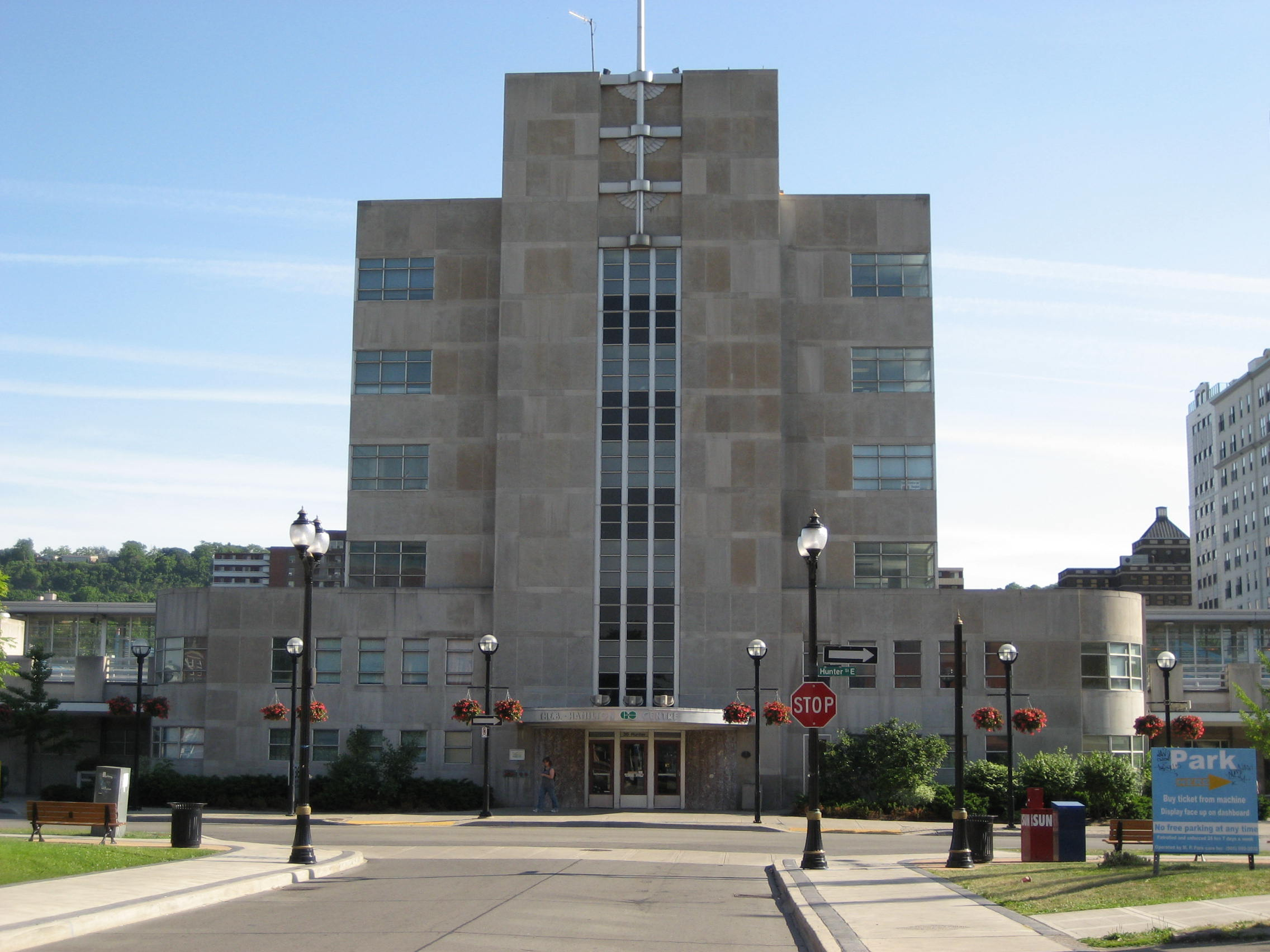

General information
- Location: 36 Hunter Street East; Hamilton, Ontario; Canada
- Coordinates: 43°15′11″N 79°52′09″W
- Platforms: 1 island platform
- Tracks: 2 + 1 bypass
- Bus routes: 11 16 17 18 40 41 47
- Bus stands: 18
- Connections: Hamilton Street Railway

Construction
- Platform levels: 2
- Parking: 54 reserved parking spots
- Cycle facilities: 45 secure indoor spaces (paid); 98 covered outdoor spaces 44 exposed outdoor spaces
- Accessible: Yes

Other information
- Station code: GO Transit: HA
- Fare zone: 18

History
- Opened: 1933
- Rebuilt: 1996
- Former names: TH&B Railway Station

Services
Preceding station	GO Transit	Following station
Terminus	Lakeshore West (peak express)	Aldershot towards Union
Former services
Preceding station	Canadian Pacific Railway	Following station
Waterdown South toward Goderich	Goderich – Hamilton	Terminus
through to TH&B	Hamilton – Toronto	Sunnyside toward Toronto
Preceding station	Toronto, Hamilton and Buffalo Railway	Following station
through to Canadian Pacific	Main Line	Stoney Creek toward Welland
Dundas toward Waterford	Waterford– Hamilton	Terminus

Ontario Heritage Act
- Official name: GO Train Station/former Toronto, Hamilton and Buffalo Railway Station
- Designated: 1994

Heritage Railway Station (Canada)
- Official name: Toronto, Hamilton & Buffalo Railway Station
- Designated: 1991
- Reference no.: 6531
Location

Hamilton GO Centre is a commuter rail station and bus terminal in downtown Hamilton, Ontario, Canada. As the terminal stop for evening rush-hour Lakeshore West line trains, it is a major hub for GO Transit bus and train services.

== History ==
Hamilton GO Centre is a Streamline Moderne building designed by New York architects Fellheimer & Wagner. It was planned as a large complex, but was reduced in size to that of a 7-storey office block. It opened in 1933 as the head office and the Hamilton station of the Toronto, Hamilton and Buffalo Railway (TH&B). Passenger service on the TH&B was discontinued on April 26, 1981, and the TH&B merged into the Canadian Pacific Railway in 1987, leaving the facility disused.

In the early 1990s, GO Transit provided service out of two facilities in Hamilton: trains were routed along the CN Grimsby subdivision to the Hamilton CNR Station 1.6 km to the north, and buses operated from an older bus station on the northern edge of Hamilton's Central Business District (CBD) at John Street North and Rebecca Street. In order to better connect GO Transit service to Hamilton's CBD, improve the interface with the Hamilton Street Railway, and consolidate train and bus services at a single site, renovations were undertaken to convert the TH&B station into the Hamilton GO Centre. The new facility, designed by Garwood-Jones & Hanham Architects, opened on April 30, 1996.

== Hamilton Street Railway ==
On June 28, 2009, downtown bus routes were realigned and new bus platforms inside the GO Centre become the downtown terminus points for routes 1 King, 2 Barton and 3 Cannon. The seasonal route 51 University continued to stop inside the station's bus terminal. Many other Hamilton Street Railway (HSR) routes stop immediately adjacent to the Hamilton GO Centre, on Hunter, James, and John streets.

== GO Transit ==
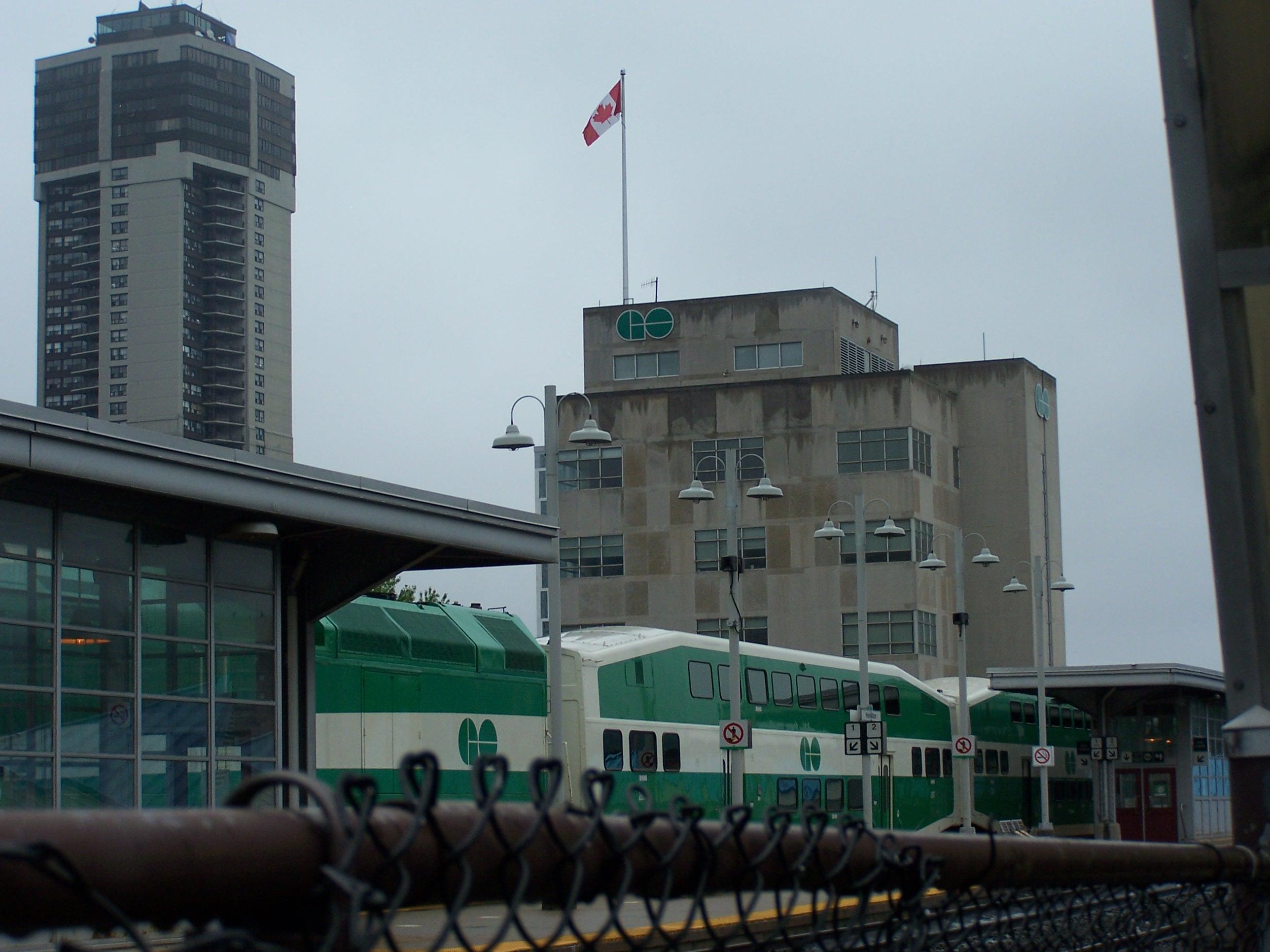
GO train sitting outside the GO centre

The GO station is served by GO's Lakeshore West line during peak hours; bus service to Aldershot Station in neighbouring Burlington is offered off-peak. It serves as the western terminus of GO bus routes 16, 18, 40, and 47. Via Rail trains do not serve Hamilton, but interchange with the GO line at Aldershot.

== Toronto, Hamilton and Buffalo Railway Museum ==
A railway museum with an interpretation centre is located on the mezzanine level.

== Bus platform assignments ==
- 1–3: GO Bus 18, connector to GO Train (via Aldershot) to Union
- 3–5: GO Bus 16, Queen Elizabeth Way express to Toronto Union Station Bus Terminal
- 6–8: GO Bus 40, Hamilton/Richmond Hill Pearson Express to Richmond Hill Centre Terminal, via Burlington and Oakville Carpool Lots, Square One, Dixie Transitway Station, Renforth Transitway Station, Toronto Pearson International Airport and Highway 407 Bus Terminal
- 8–9: GO Bus 47, Highway 407 West to Highway 407 Bus Terminal via McMaster University, Burlington, Bronte and Oakville Carpool Lots, Erin Mills Transitway Station, Square One and Bramalea GO
- 10-11: Layover
- 12-14: Employee parking
- 15: Darts Loading/Unloading
- 17: Hamilton Street Railway - Route 3 Cannon and Route 51 University
- 18: Hamilton Street Railway - Route 1 King and Route 2 Barton

== See also ==
- Transportation in Hamilton, Ontario
- West Harbour GO Station
- Confederation GO Station
- List of designated heritage railway stations of Canada
