= Dundurn Street (Hamilton, Ontario) =

Lower City arterial road in Hamilton, Ontario, Canada

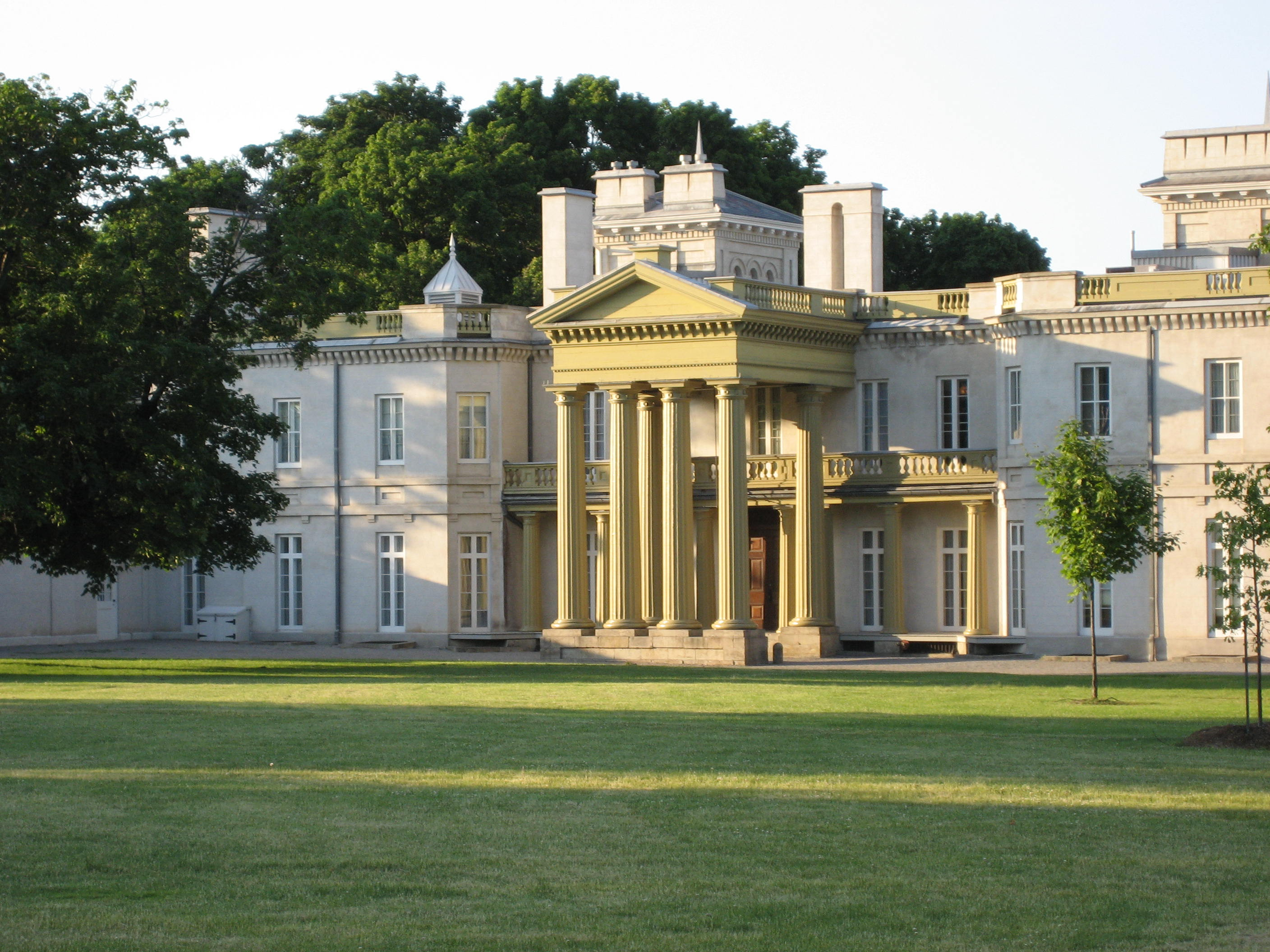
Dundurn Castle at Dundurn Park. (Summer)

Dundurn Street is a Lower City arterial road in Hamilton, Ontario, Canada. It is a two-way street that starts off at Mountain Face Park, Niagara Escarpment in front of the Bruce Trail as a collector road, right behind Hillcrest Avenue and then turns into a four lane thoroughfare from Aberdeen Avenue northward to York Boulevard where it ends in front of Dundurn Park.

The section of Dundurn Street north of Main Street was designated as part of Highway 2, until January 1, 1998.

== History ==
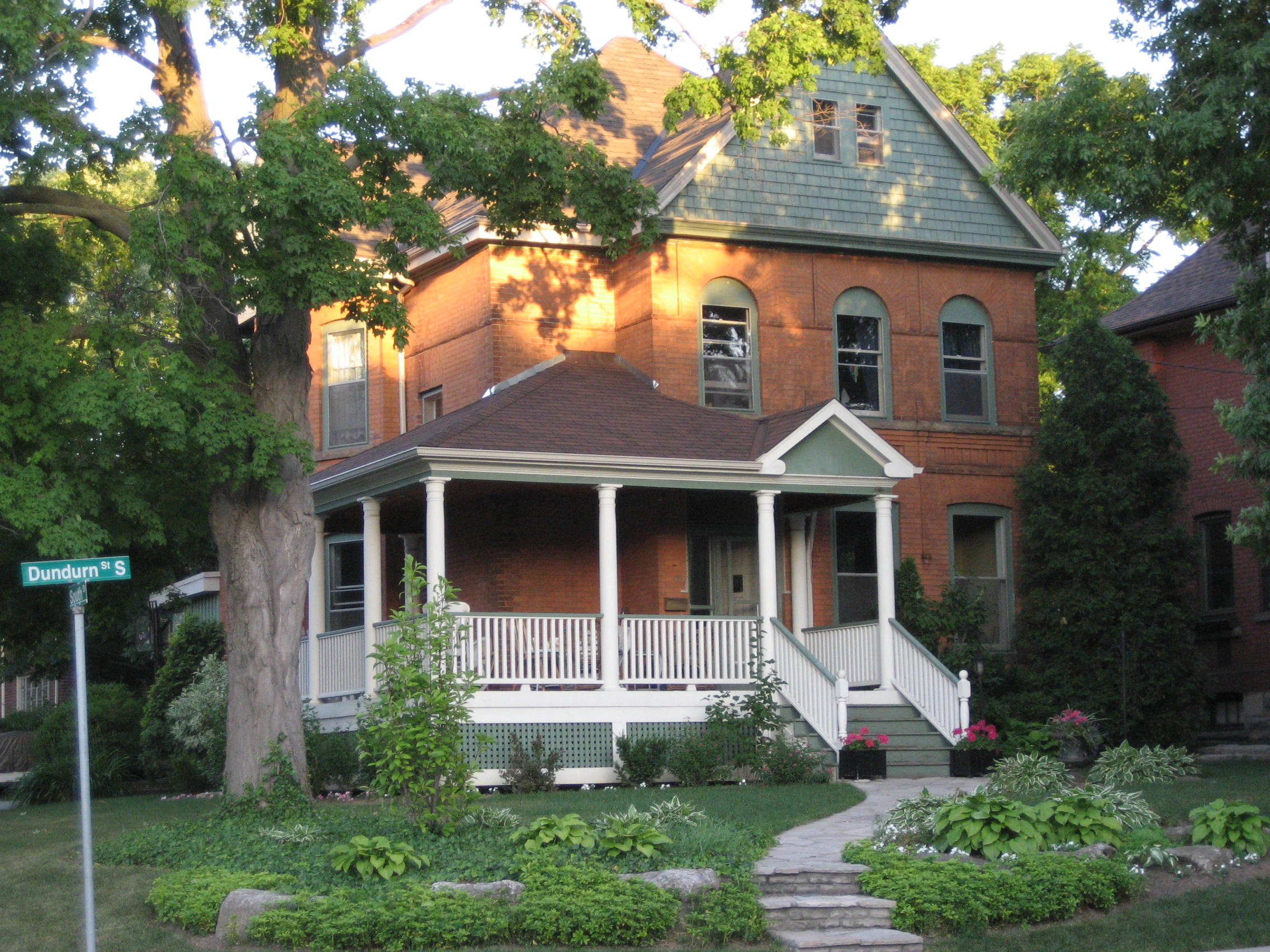
Dundurn Street South neighbourhood

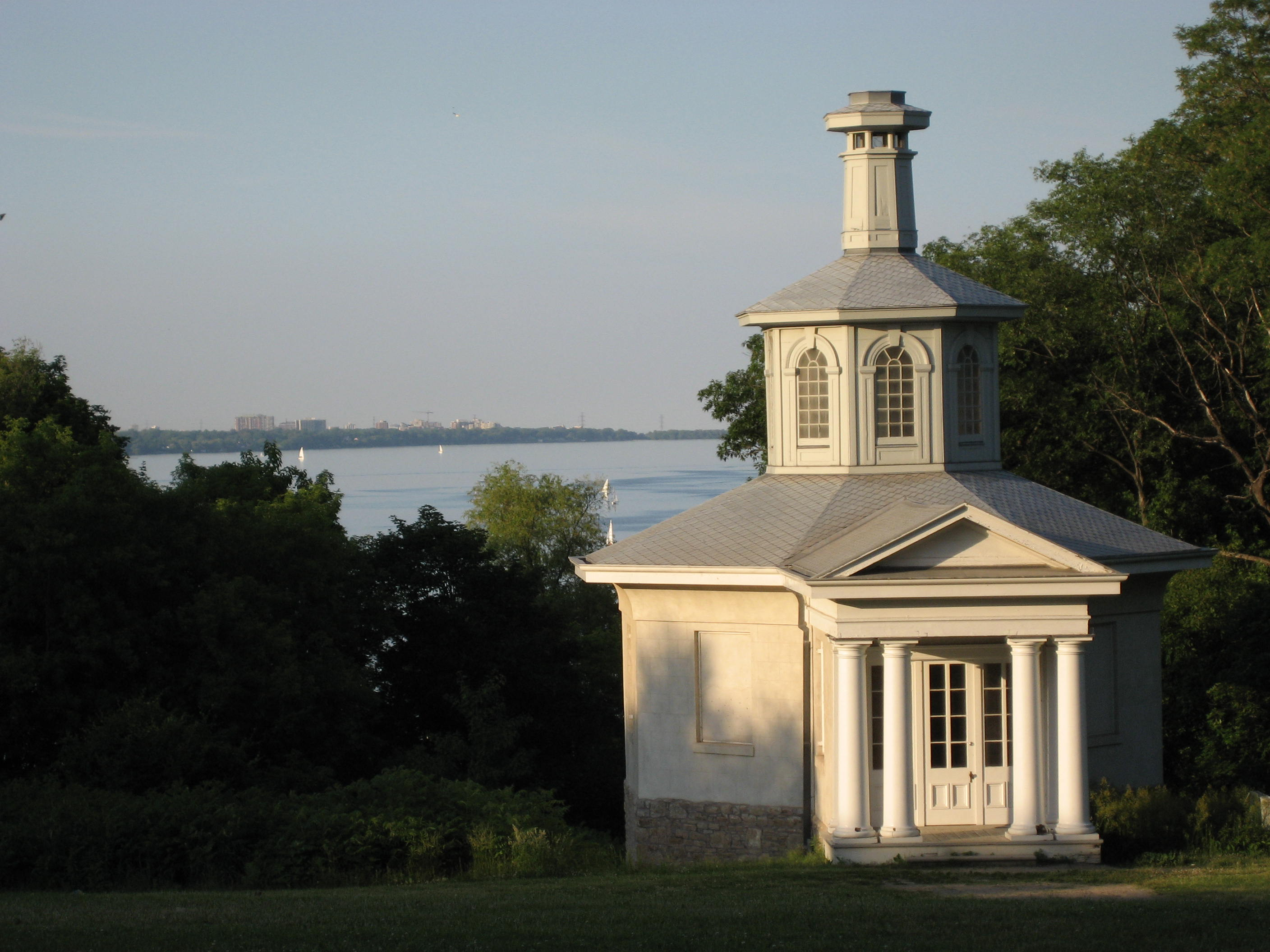
Dundurn Park, "Mystery building"

Dundurn Street, originated with Sir Allan MacNab who named his home Dundurn Castle and its landscaped grounds Dundurn Park. Originally Dundurn Street, South of King Street West was known as Garth Street up to 1913. Dundurn is a Gaelic word meaning "the fort on the water." (sic - This is a persistent incorrect translation perpetuated in many historical works about Dundurn Castle. The original source of the error is not known. Dundurn actually derives from the Gaelic words dùn meaning "hill fort" and dòrn meaning "fist", thus Dundurn means "hill fort of a fist". It is named after Sir Allan MacNab's ancestral family home in Dundurn, Perthshire, Scotland, just east of Loch Earn, which was the site of an ancient Pictish hill fort named Dùn Dòrn. So named because the hill upon which it sat is shaped like a fist. There are many Gaelic words referring to water, none of which resembles the place name element durn. The erroneous translation "fort on the water" likely derives from a confusion with the Scots word burn, which means "creek" and is not a Gaelic word at all. - citation to be added shortly)

The Hamilton Military Museum opened in 1976 and is situated inside Dundurn Park adjacent to Dundurn Castle. It tells the story of the service given by citizens of the Hamilton area from the time of the American Revolution to World War II.

The Staircase originally was opened by Hugh MacLeod in 1998. The Staircase evolved and expanded from an improvisational comedy workshop to include an art gallery, a cafe, a theatre for film and live acts, and a rehearsal space. A former variety store next door was also acquired.

== Bruce Trail ==
One can reach the Bruce Trail via the stairway on Dundurn Street South. The trail cuts through the city along the Niagara Escarpment (mountain) and used by many locals for a full days hike. The Trail is 430 miles long and starts at Niagara Falls, passes through Hamilton and ends at the Bruce Peninsula. Hikers are led to scenic gorges, hidden waterfalls and places of quiet charm.

== Landmarks ==
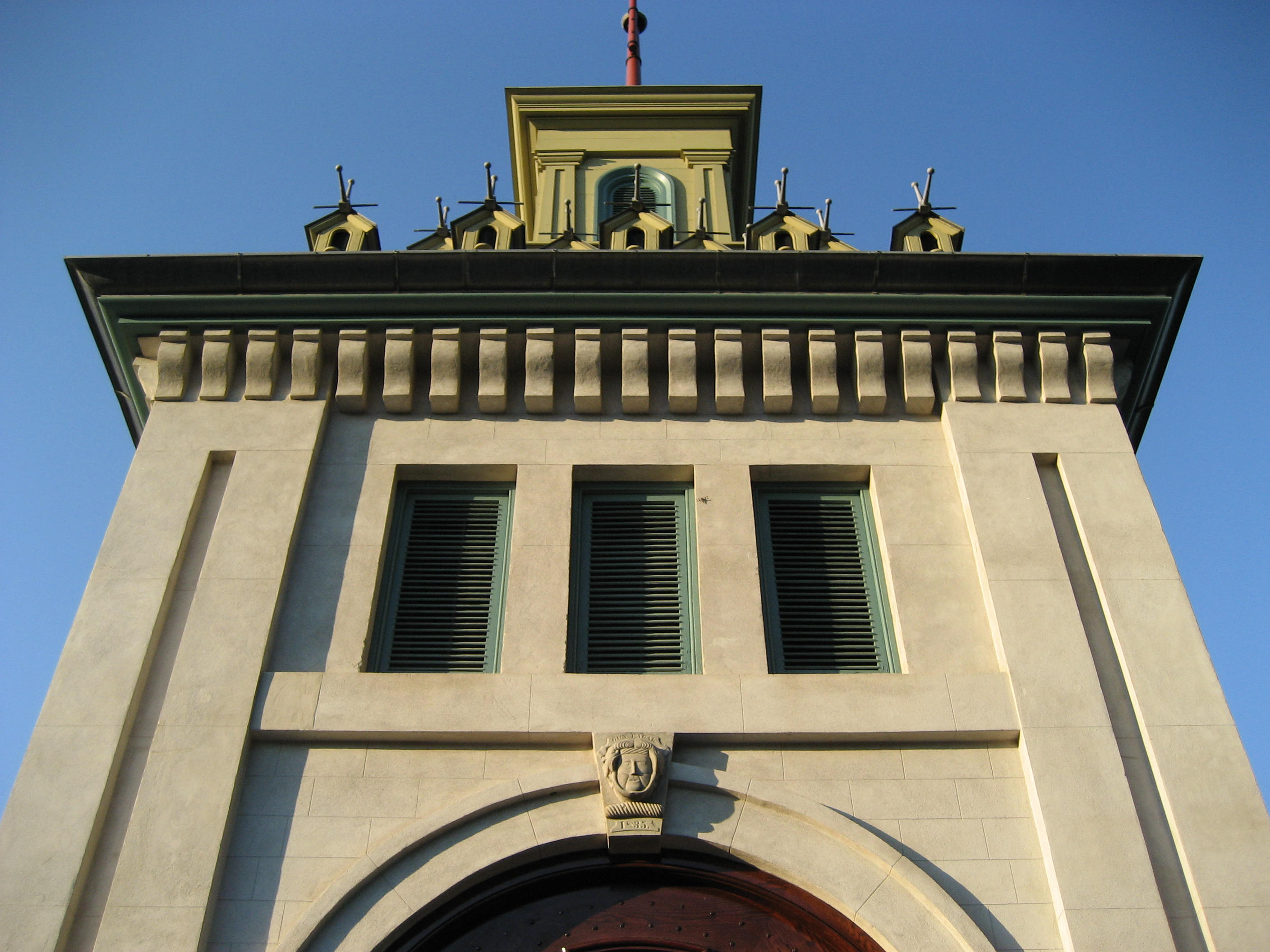
Dundurn Park

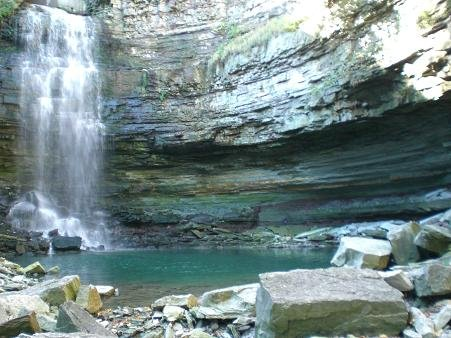
Chedoke Falls

Note: Listing of Landmarks from North to South.

- Dundurn Park
- Dundurn Park "Mystery building"
- Dundurn Castle & Military Museum
  - (Just east of Dundurn Castle near Castle Dean at Locke Street north is original burial spot of Sir Allan Napier MacNab)
- The Admiral Inn (Hotel)
- Staircase Cafe Theatre
- Dundurn Plaza (shopping)
- TV Hamilton- Cable 14, building
- Jackson Playground
- Canadian Pacific Railway overpass
- Hill Street Park
- First Unitarian Church
  - (M.A.D.) Music Art Drama- Creative Arts School
- Highland Gardens Park, (off of Hillcrest Avenue)
- Mountain Face Park
- Dundurn Street Stairway (Mountain-access), 326 steps
- Chedoke Rail Trail (abandoned railway path)
- Bruce Trail, westward the trail leads to Chedoke Beddoe Civic Golf Course & Chedoke Winter Sports Park, the site of a Ski hill and as well many waterfalls which are listed below. Eastward the trail leads to Highland Gardens Park.
  - Chedoke Falls
  - Denlow Falls
  - Cliffview Falls
  - Westcliffe Falls
- Niagara Escarpment ("mountain")

== Communities ==
Note: Listing of neighbourhoods from North to South

- Strathcona
- Kirkendall North
- Kirkendall South

== Images ==
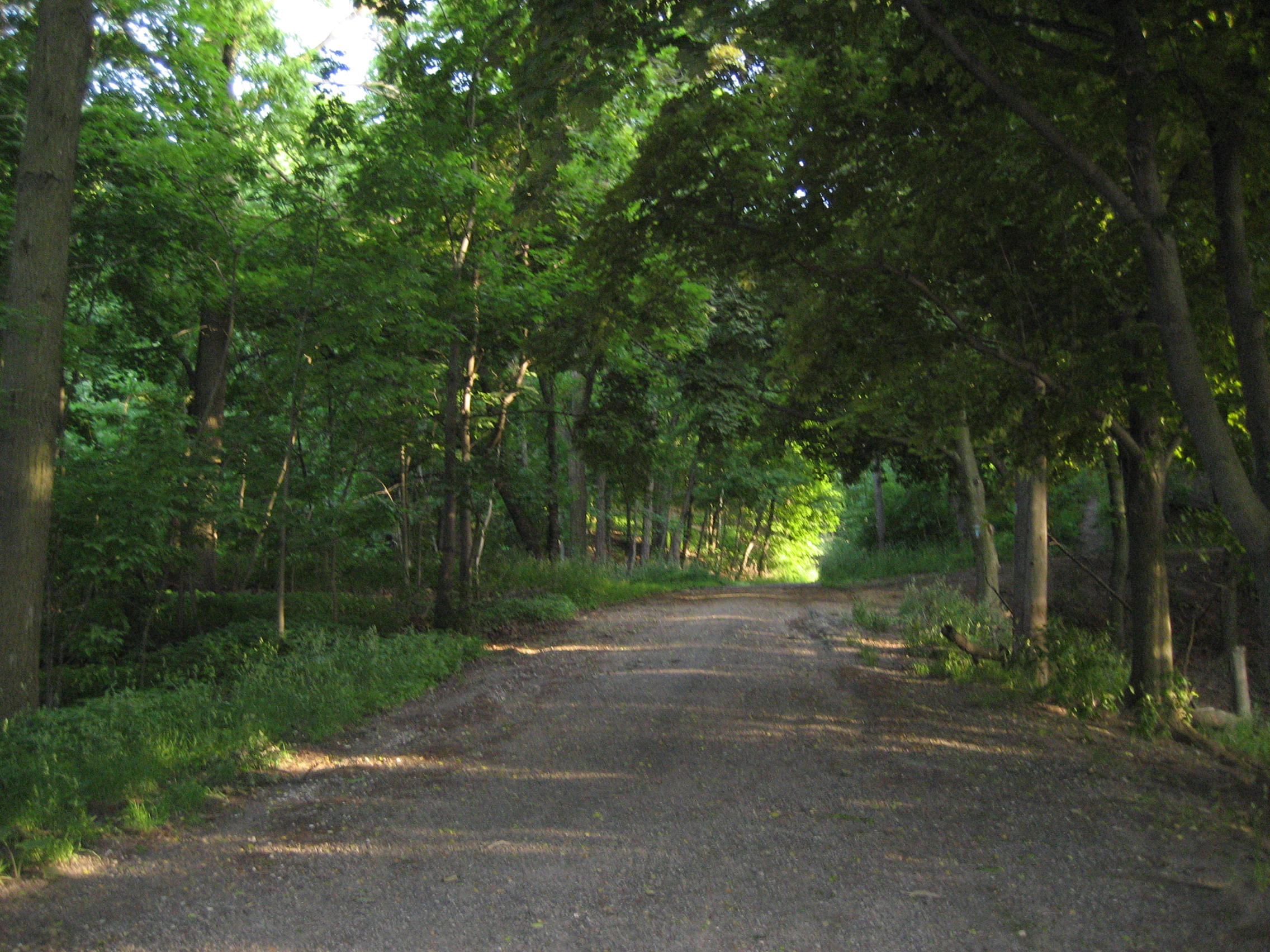
Chedoke Rail Trail

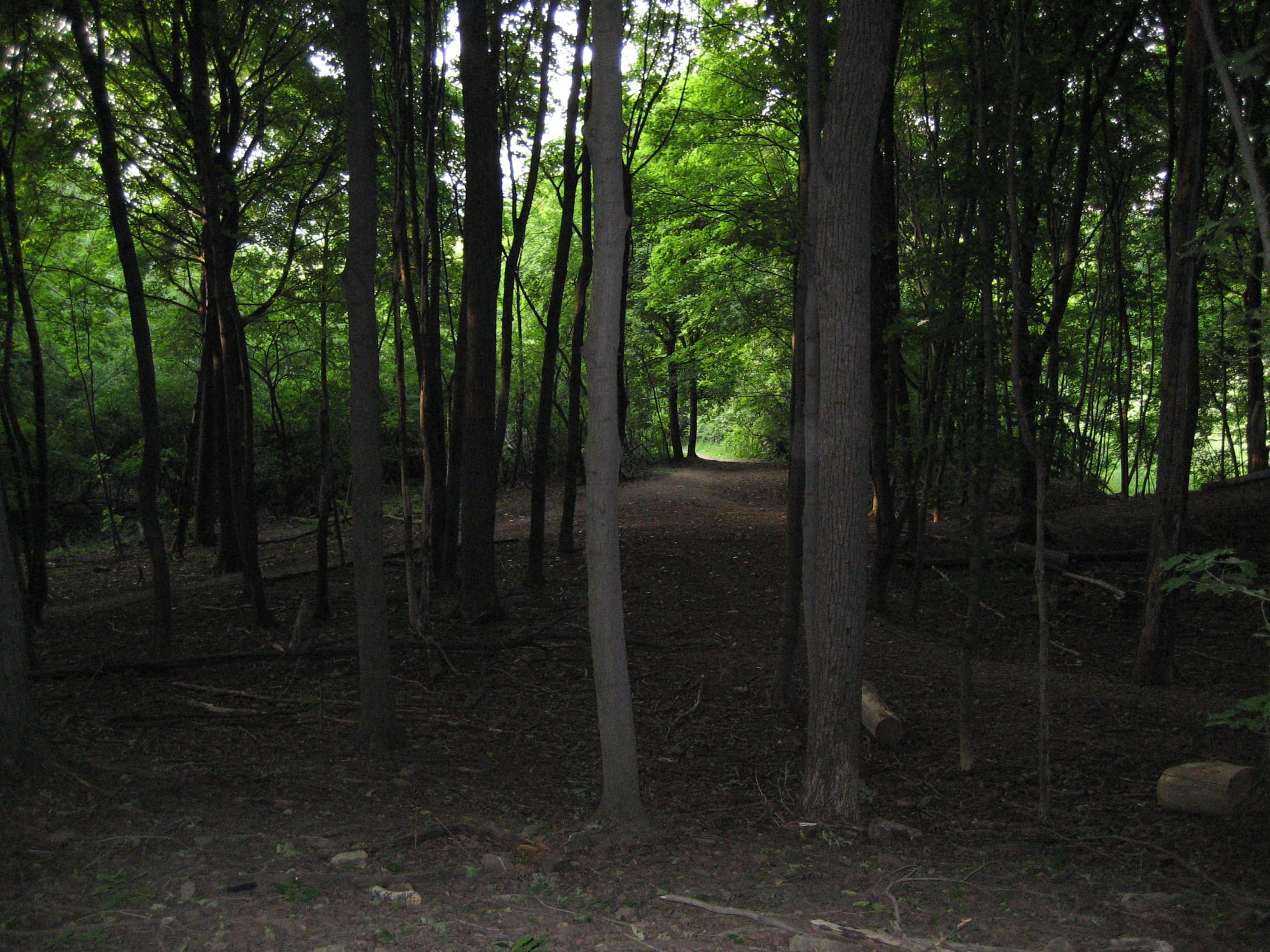
Bruce Trail

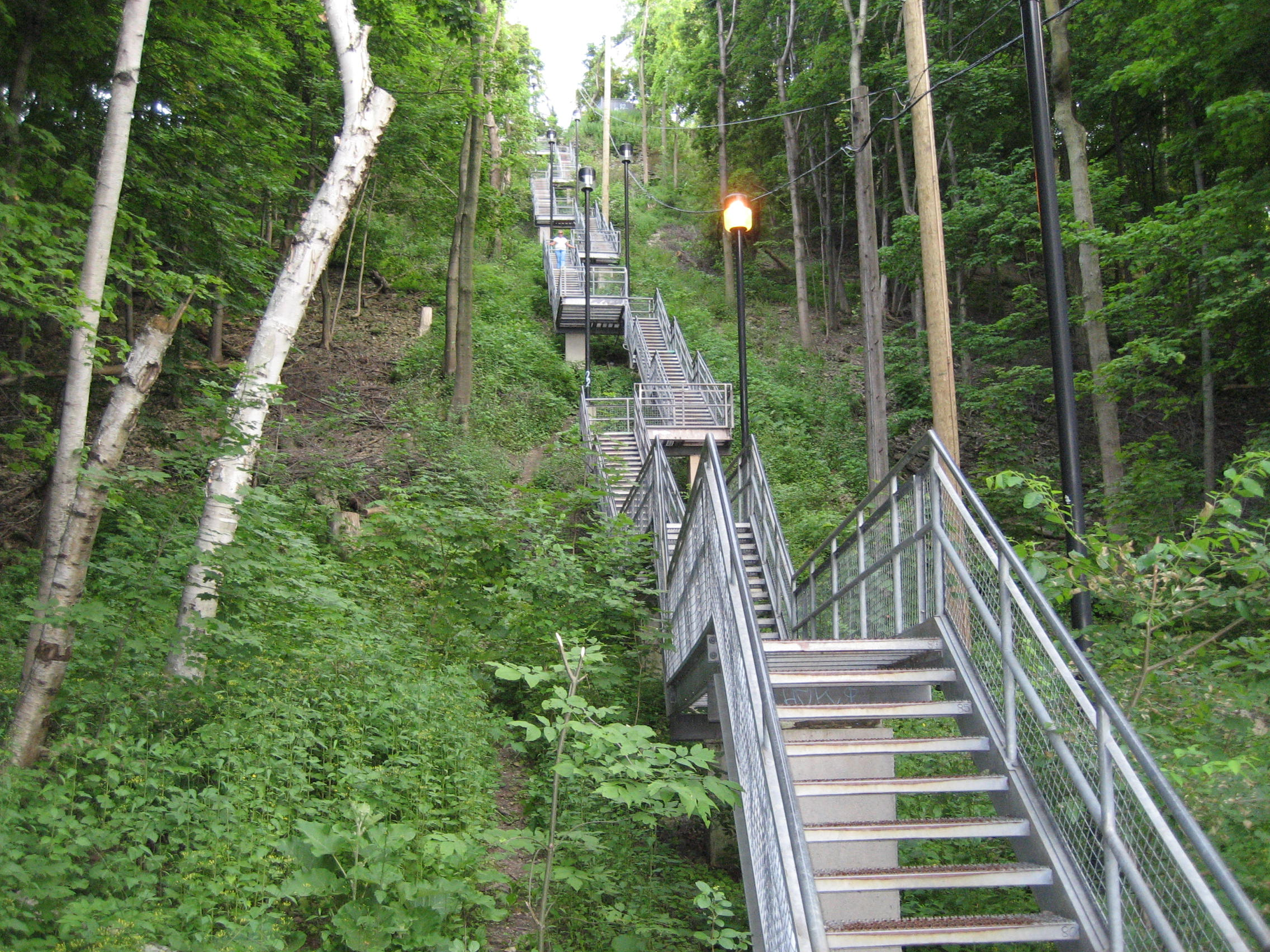
Dundurn Street South, Mountain-access stairway

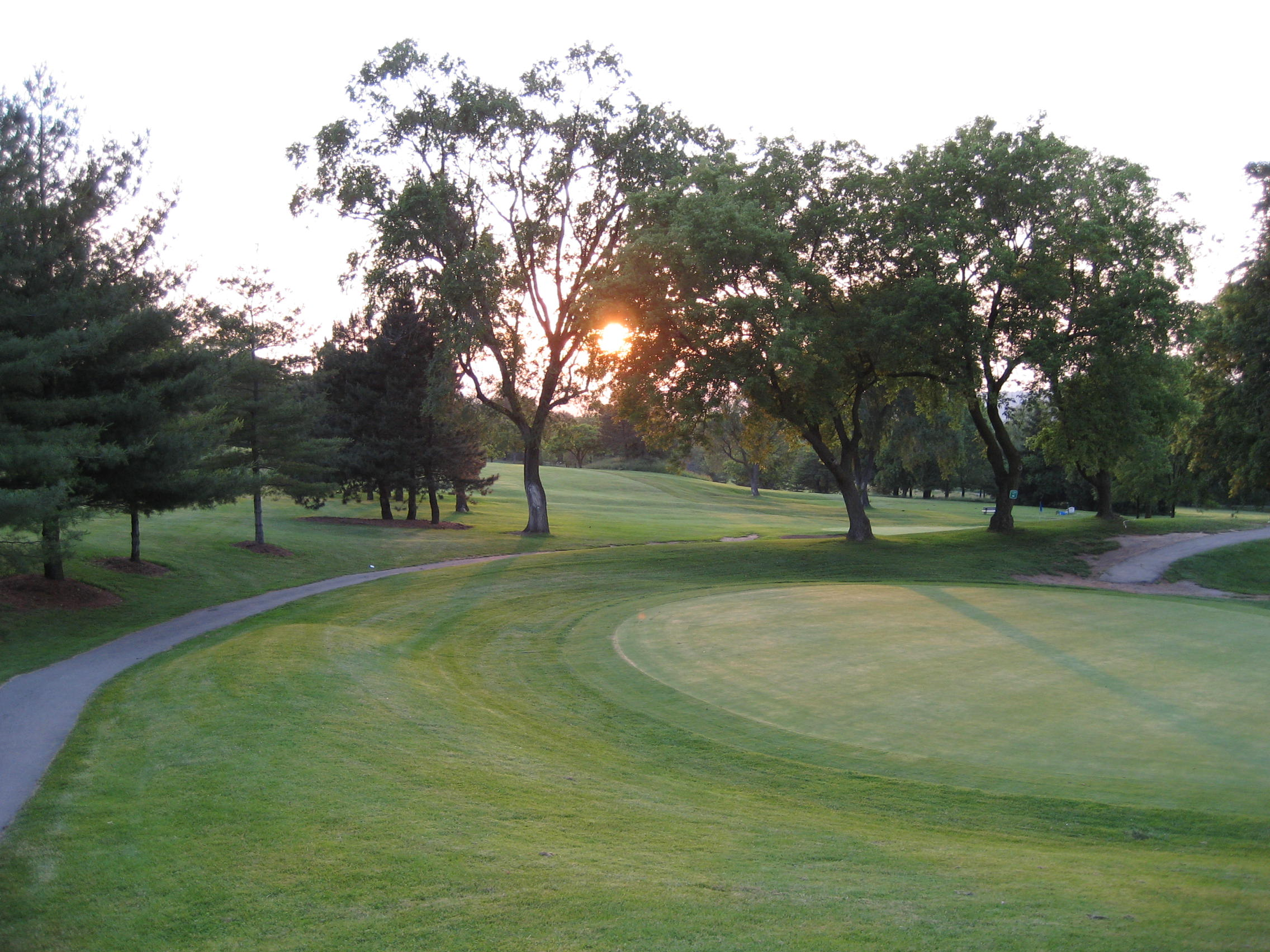
Chedoke Civic Golf Course can be reached via the Bruce Trail, West of Dundurn Street South
