= Gustavus (name) =

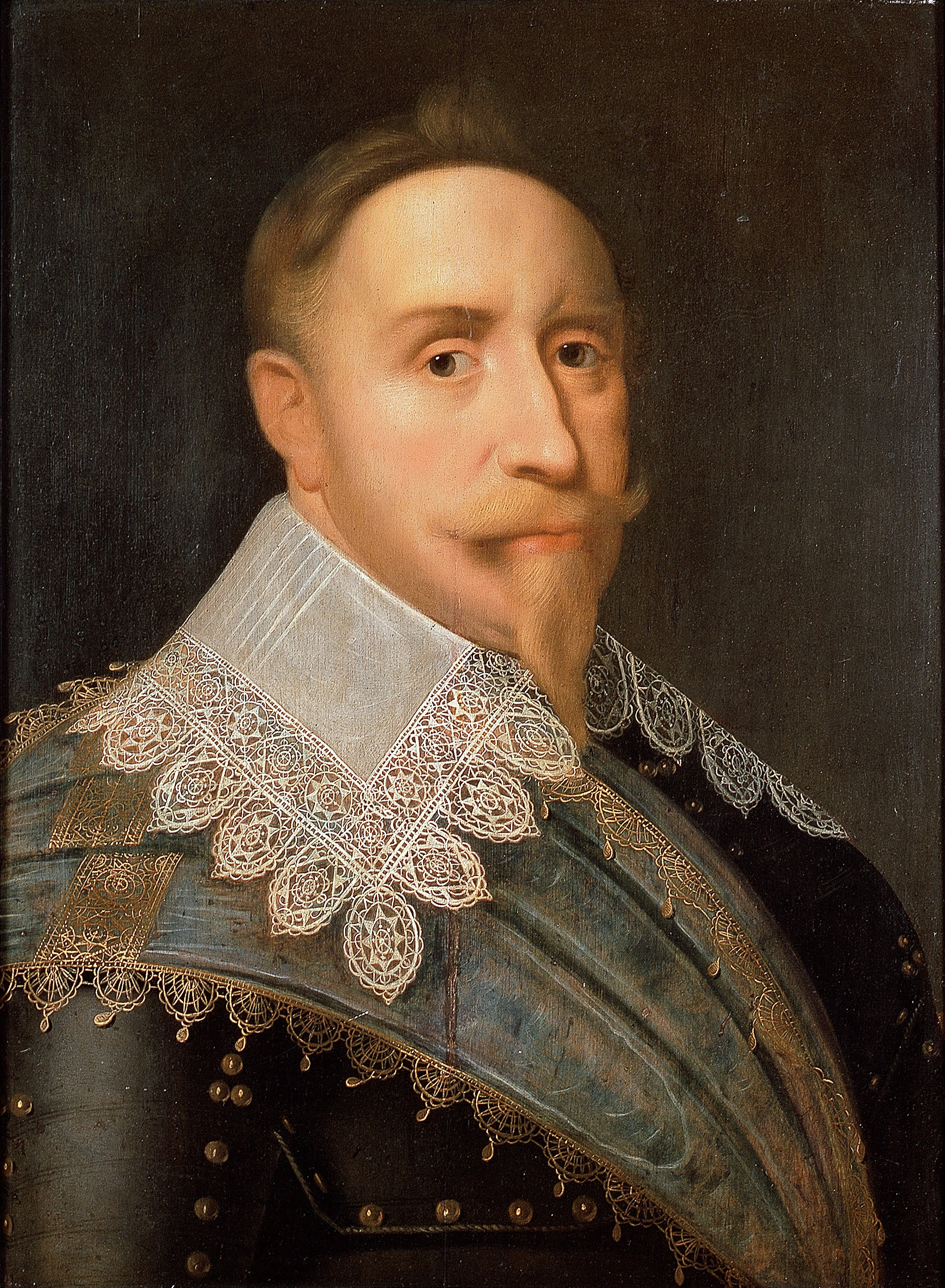
- Gustavus Adolphus of Sweden
- Gender: Male

Origin
- Origin: Swedish or Slavic

Other names
- Related names: Gustav, Gustaf, Gustavo, Gistav, Gostislav, Gustl, Kustaa, Kustas

Gustavus is the Latinised form of the male given name Gustav or Gustaf, of Old Swedish origin, used mainly in Scandinavian countries, German-speaking countries, and the Low Countries.

The origin of the name is debated. The name was first recorded in 1225 in Västergötland, Sweden, in the Latin form Gostauus. Other 13th-century variants include Gødstaui, Gøstaf and Gøzstaf. Linguistic Otto von Friesen suggested that it may derive from a byname meaning "staff of the Göta people" or "support of the (Väst)göta people". Another theory speculates that the name is of Medieval Slavic origin, from Gostislav, a compound word meaning "glorious guest", derived from the Slavic words ghosti ("guest") and slava ("glory"), and was adopted by migrating groups north and west into Germany and Scandinavia.

This name has been borne by eight kings of Sweden, starting from Gustav Vasa in the 16th century and including the current king, Carl XVI Gustaf. The name has entered other languages as well. In French it is Gustave; in Italian, Portuguese, and Spanish it is Gustavo. The Latinized form is Gustavus. A side-form of the name in Swedish is Gösta. The name in Finnish is Kustaa, while in Icelandic it is written Gústav or Gústaf.

== A-G ==
- Gustavus Abeel (1801–1887), American pastor, missionary, and writer
- Gustavus Adolphus (1594–1632), King of Sweden from 1611 to 1632
- Gustavus Adolphus of the Palatinate (1632–1641), last son of Frederick V, Elector Palatine
- Gustavus Aird (1813–1898), Scottish minister of the Free Church of Scotland
- Gustavus M. Blech (1870–1949), Russian-born American physician, surgeon, and medical educator
- Gustavus Miller Bower (1790–1864), U.S. Representative from Missouri
- Gustavus Brander (1720–1787), English naturalist
- Gustavus Vaughan Brooke (1818–1866), Irish stage actor
- Gustavus Richard Brown (1747–1804), friend of George Washington, physician, and botanist
- Gustavus Conyngham (1747–1819), Irish-born American merchant sea captain
- Gustavus Wynne Cook (1867–1940), American banker, businessman, and amateur astronomer
- Gustavus Coulson (1879–1901), British Army officer and English recipient of the Victoria Cross
- Gustavus Cox (1870–1958), Barbadian cricketer
- Gustavus De Russy (1818–1891), U.S. Army career officer and American Civil War general
- Gustavus Cheyney Doane (1840–1892), U.S. Army Cavalry Captain, explorer, and inventor
- Gustavus Esselen (1888–1952), American chemist
- Gustavus A. Finkelnburg (1837–1908), United States representative from Missouri and federal judge
- Gustavus Fowke (1880–1946), English army officer and first-class cricketer
- Gustavus Fox (1821–1883), U.S. Navy officer
- Gustavus Richard Glenn (1848–1939), American academic
- Gustavus Green (1865–1964), British engineer and contributor to the design of early aircraft engines

== H-N ==
- Gustavus Hamilton (disambiguation), various people
- Gustavus Handcock (1693–1751), Irish politician
- Gustavus Adolphus Henry Sr. (1804–1880), American politician who served as a Confederate States Senator from Tennessee
- Gustavus Hesselius (1682–1755), Swedish-American painter
- Gustavus Hines (1809–1873), American missionary
- Gustavus Detlef Hinrichs (1836–1923), chemist and natural philosopher
- Gustavus Holmes, builder of the Gustavus Holmes House
- Gustavus Hume (1730–1812), president of the Royal College of Surgeons in Ireland
- Gustavus Hume (British Army officer) (1826–1891), British Army soldier in the Crimean War
- Gustavus Katterfelto (c. 1743–1799), Prussian conjurer, scientific lecturer, and quack
- Gustavus Kelly (1901–1980), Irish cricketer
- Gustavus Town Kirby (1874–1956), American sports administrator who was president of the Amateur Athletic Union
- Gustavus Loomis (1789–1872), U.S. Army officer
- Gustavus Hindman Miller (1857–1929), prominent Tennessee merchant, manufacturer, financier, capitalist farmer, author
- Gustavus Murray (1831–1887), British obstetrician
- Gustavus Myers (1872–1942), American journalist and historian
  - Gustavus Myers Center for the Study of Bigotry and Human Rights, named for the journalist
  - Gustavus Myers Outstanding Book Award, named for the journalist
- Gustavus Adolphus Neumann (1807−1886), German-born American newspaper publisher
- Gustavus A. Northcott (1861–1938), Republican President of the West Virginia Senate
- Gustavus Reinhold Nyländer (1776–1825), German Lutheran missionary and linguist who worked in Sierra Leone

== O-Z ==
- Gustavus Orr (1819–1887), early proponent of the public education system of the U.S. state of Georgia
- Gustavus Pike (fl. 1880s), builder of the Gustavus and Sarah T. Pike House
- Gustavus G. Prescott, Charleston merchant and builder of the Gustavus G. Prescott House
- Gustavus Poznanski (1804–1879), South Carolina cantor and religious leader
- Gustavus Schmidt (1795–1877), American lawyer and lecturer on Civil Law at the University of Louisiana
- Gustavus Scott (1753–1800), American lawyer who served in legislative capacities in Maryland in the American Revolutionary War
- Gustavus H. Scott (1812–1882), U.S. Navy officer
- Gustavus Sessinghaus (1838–1887), U.S. Representative from Missouri
- Gustavus Sidenberg (1843–1915), Jewish-American manufacturer and financier
- Gustavus Simmons (born 1930), American cryptographer
- Gustavus Smith (disambiguation), various people
- Gustavus Sniper (1836–1894), German-born Union Army brevet brigadier general in the American Civil War
- Gustavus Swan (1787–1860), Ohio lawyer and banker
- Gustavus Franklin Swift (1839–1903), American business executive
- Gustavus Talbot (1848–1920), British member of parliament and a Coalition Conservative politician
- Gustavus Trask (1836–1914), governor of Sailors' Snug Harbor
- Gustavus von Tempsky (1828–1868), Prussian adventurer, artist, newspaper correspondent, and soldier
- Gustavus Waffelaert (1847–1931), 22nd bishop of Bruges in Belgium
- Gustavus Waltz (fl. 1732–1759), German bass opera singer
- Gustavus Athol Waterhouse (1877–1950), Australian entomologist
- Gustavus Woodson Wickliffe (1869–1921), American lawyer
- Gustavus Blin Wright (1830–1898), Canadian pioneer roadbuilder and entrepreneur

== See also ==
- Gustava, a feminine form
- Gustavas Gvildys (fl. 1920s–1930s), Lithuanian footballer
- Murder of Gustavous Lee Carmichael (died 1974), formerly unidentified person
