= Gustav Holm =

Gustav or Gustaf Holm may refer to:

- Gustaf Birger Anders Holm (1845–1910), Swedish lawyer and publisher
- Gustav Engelbert Holm (1883–1957), Swedish farm worker and member of parliament
- Gustav Frederik Holm (1849–1940), Danish naval officer and Arctic explorer
- Robert Weil (writer) (1881–1950), Austrian writer for stage and screen who used "Gustav Holm" as a pseudonym
- Gustav Holm (footballer)

== See also ==
- Gustav (name)
- Holm (surname)
- Gösta (disambiguation)
  - Gösta Holmér (1891–1983), Swedish decathlete
