= Gustav (name) =

Masculine given name

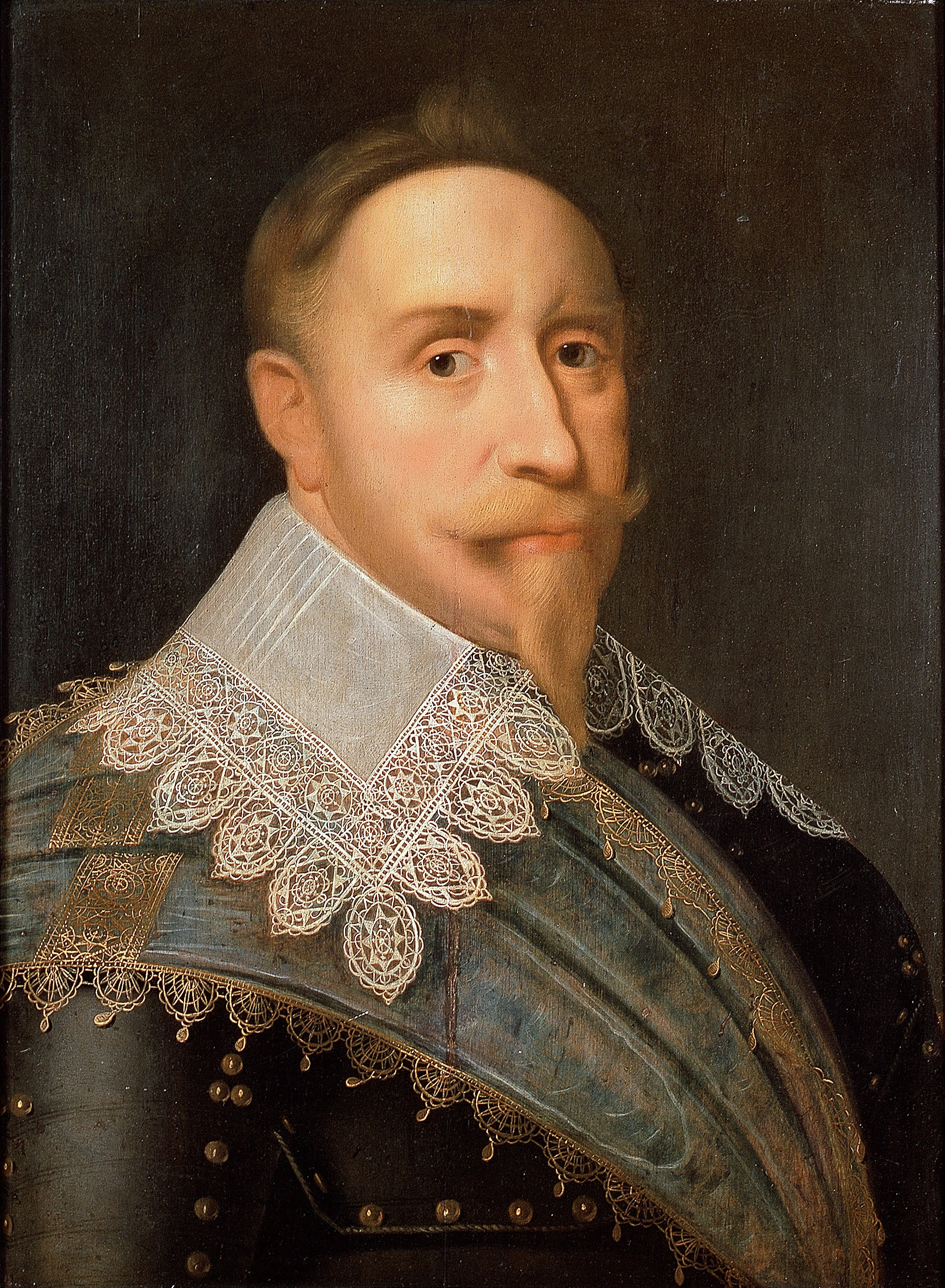
- King Gustav II Adolph of Sweden
- Gender: Male

Origin
- Language: Old Swedish

Other names
- Related names: Gustaf, Gustavo, Gistav, Gostislav, Gustl, Kustas, Kustaa

Gustav, also spelled Gustaf (pronounced /ˈɡʊstɑːv/ or /ˈɡʊstɑːf/ in English; Swedish: [ˈɡɵ̂sːtav] for both spellings), is a male given name of Old Swedish origin, used mainly in Scandinavian countries, German-speaking countries, and the Low Countries. The origin of the name is debated. The name was first recorded in 1225 in Västergötland, Sweden, in the Latin form Gostauus. Other 13th-century variants include Gødstaui, Gøstaf and Gøzstaf . Linguist Otto von Friesen suggested that it may derive from a byname meaning "staff of the Göta people" or "support of the (Väst)göta people". Another theory speculates that the name is of Medieval Slavic origin, from Gostislav, a compound word meaning "glorious guest", derived from the Slavic words gostь ("guest") and slava ("glory"), and was adopted by migrating groups north and west into Germany and Scandinavia.

This name has been borne by eight kings of Sweden, starting from Gustav Vasa in the 16th century and including the current king, Carl XVI Gustaf. The name has entered other languages as well. In French it is Gustave; in Italian, Portuguese, and Spanish it is Gustavo. The Latinized form is Gustavus. A side-form of the name in Swedish is Gösta. The name in Finnish is Kustaa, while in Icelandic it is written Gústav or Gústaf. Gustav (Kustaa) has a name day on June 6 in Swedish and Finnish calendars, in commemoration of Gustav Vasa's election as King of Sweden on June 6, 1523.

== People ==
=== Royalty and nobility ===
==== Sweden ====
- Gustav I (1496–1560), King of Sweden 1523–1560, whose reign marked the end of the Kalmar Union; founder of the Vasa dynasty
- Gustav of Sweden (1568–1607), son of Eric XIV and Karin Månsdotter
- Gustav II Adolf (1594–1632), or Gustavus Adolphus, King of Sweden 1611–1632, military leader during the Thirty Year War, sometimes referred to as the "Father of modern warfare" or "The Lion of the North"
- Gustav of Vasaborg, (1616–1653), Swedish noble and military officer
- Karl X Gustav (1622–1660), King of Sweden 1654–1660
- Gustav III (1746–1792), King of Sweden 1771–1792, who highly influenced the arts of Sweden during the Neo-Classical era and who temporarily reinstated absolute monarchy
- Gustav, Prince of Vasa (1799–1877), Crown Prince of Sweden
- Gustav IV Adolf (1778–1837), King of Sweden 1792–1809
- Prince Gustaf, Duke of Uppland (1827–1852), second son of Oscar I and Josephine of Leuchtenberg
- Gustaf V (1858–1950), King of Sweden 1907–1950
- Gustaf VI Adolf (1882–1973), King of Sweden 1950–1973
- Prince Gustaf Adolf, Duke of Västerbotten (1906–1947)
- Carl XVI Gustaf (born 1946), King of Sweden 1973–present

==== Other places ====
- Gustav of Saxe-Lauenburg (c. 1570–1597)
- Gustav, Duke of Zweibrücken (1670–1731)
- Gustav, Landgrave of Hesse-Homburg (1781–1848)
- Count Gustav Kálnoky (1832–1898), Austro-Hungarian diplomat and statesman
- Gustav, 7th Prince of Sayn-Wittgenstein-Berleburg (born 1969)
- Gustaf Falkenberg (1860–1917), Swedish baron and diplomat

=== Others ===
- Gustaph (singer) (born 1980), Belgian singer-songwriter, producer and vocal coach
- Gustav Åbergsson (1775–1852), Swedish stage actor
- Gustav Ahnelöv (born 1996), Swedish ice hockey player
- Gustav Elijah Åhr (1996–2017), known as Lil Peep, American rapper and singer
- Gustav Aitaro, Palauan politician
- Gustav von Alvensleben (1803–1881), Prussian General of the Infantry
- Gustav A. Anderson (1893–1983), American farmer and politician
- Gustaf Andersson (1884–1961), Swedish politician
- Gustavo Adolfo Bécquer (1836–1870), Spanish poet
- Gustav Bauernfeind (1848–1904), German painter famous for his Orientalist paintings
- Gustave Biéler (1904–1944), Swiss-born Canadian Special Operations Executive agent during World War II
- Gustav Burton (born 2002), British racing driver
- Gustavo Charif (born 1966), writer, visual artist and film director
- Gustave Colin (1814–1880), French politician
- Gustave-Henri Colin (1828–1910), French painter
- J. P. Gustav Lejeune Dirichlet (1805–1859), German mathematician
- Gustav Hesselblad (1906–1989), Swedish military doctor
- Gaspard-Gustave de Coriolis (1792–1843), scientist for whom the Coriolis effect is named
- Gustaf Dalén (1869–1937), Swedish inventor and Nobel Prize laureate
- Gustave Doré (1832–1883), French artist, engraver, and illustrator
- Gustave Eiffel (1832–1923), French engineer, designer of the Eiffel Tower
- Gustav Ernst (born 1944), Austrian playwright, novelist and screenwriter
- Gustav Fechner (1801–1887), German philosopher, physicist, and scientist
- Gustav Fehn (1892–1945), German general during World War II
- Gustav A. Fischer (1848–1886), German explorer
- Gustave Flaubert (1821–1880), French writer best known for Madame Bovary
- Gustaf Fröding (1860–1911), Swedish author and poet
- Gustav Fröhlich (1902–1987), German actor
- Gustav Antonio Gjessing (1835–1921), Norwegian philologist
- Gustaf Gründgens (1899–1963), German actor
- Gustav Hamel (1889–1914), British aviation pioneer
- Gustav Hareide (born 1950), Norwegian politician
- Gustav A. Hedlund (1904–1993), American mathematician
- Gustav Heinse (1896–1971) (real name Josef Klein), Bulgarian poet of Austrian origin
- Gustav Anders Hemwall (1908–1998), American physician and pioneer in Prolotherapy
- Gustav Henriksen (1872–1939), Norwegian businessman
- Gustav Ludwig Hertz (1887–1975), German physicist and Nobel Prize laureate
- Gustav Heynhold (1800–1860), German botanist
- Gustaf von Hofsten (born 1942), Swedish Navy officer and military writer
- Gustav Holst (1874–1934), British composer
- Gustáv Husák (1913–1991), President of Czechoslovakia
- Gustav Iden (born 1996), Norwegian triathlete
- Gustav Igler (1842–1908), German painter
- Gustav Isaksen (born 2001), Danish football player
- C. Gustav J. Jacobi (1804–1851), German mathematician
- Gustav Jäger (naturalist) (1832–1917), German naturalist and doctor
- Gustav Jäger (painter) (1808–1871), German painter
- Gustav Jäger (physicist) (1865–1938), Austrian physicist and lecturer
- Carl Gustav Jung (1875–1961), Swiss psychoanalyst and father of analytical psychology
- Gustav Ritter von Kahr (1862–1934), German right-wing politician in Bavaria
- Gustaf Kalliokangas (1873–1940), Finnish president
- Gustav Kirchhoff (1824–1887), German physicist who contributed to the fundamental understanding of electrical circuits, spectroscopy, and black-body radiation
- Gustav Klimt (1862–1918), Austrian symbolist painter of the Vienna Secession
- Gustav Knittel (1914–1976), German Waffen-SS officer and convicted war criminal
- Gustav Knuth (1901–1987), German actor
- Gustav Krklec (1899–1977), Croatian poet
- Gustav Landauer (1870–1919), German anarchist philosopher
- Gustaf Lantz (born 1981), Swedish politician
- Gustaf de Laval (1845–1913), Swedish engineer, inventor and entrepreneur
- Gustave Le Bon (1841–1931), French psychologist, sociologist, and physicist
- Gustav Leonhardt (1928–2012), Dutch keyboard player, conductor, musicologist, teacher, and editor
- Gustav Lundgren (musician) (born 1980), Swedish jazz guitarist
- Gustave Lyon (1857–1936), French piano maker, inventor and acoustician
- Heinrich Gustav Magnus (1802–1870), German chemist and physicist
- Gustav Mahler (1860–1911), Austrian composer and conductor
- Gustav Meyrink (1868–1932), Austrian author, novelist, dramatist, translator, and banker
- Gustave Moreau (1826–1898), French painter
- Gustaf Munthe (1896–1962), Swedish writer, art historian, and art teacher
- Gustáv Murín (born 1959), Slovak writer
- Gustav Nezval (1907–1998), Czech actor
- Gustav Noske (1868–1946), German Minister of Defence
- Gustav Adolf Nosske (1902–1990), German SS officer and Holocaust perpetrator
- Gustav Nyheim (born 2006), Norwegian footballer
- Gustav Nyquist (born 1989), Swedish professional hockey player
- Gustav Oehrli (born 1962), Swiss alpine skier
- Gustav Otto (1883–1926), German aircraft and aircraft-engine designer and manufacturer
- Oscar Gustave Rejlander, pioneering Victorian art photographer and an expert in photomontage
- Gustav Rochlitz (1889–1972), German art dealer
- Gustav Scanzoni von Lichtenfels (1855–1924), German general
- Gustav Schäfer (rower) (1906–1991), German Olympic rower
- Gustav Schäfer (drummer) (born 1988), German drummer (Tokio Hotel)
- Gustav Schickedanz (1895–1977), German entrepreneur
- Gustav A. Schneebeli (1853–1923), U.S. Representative from Pennsylvania
- Gustav Schröder (1885–1959), German sea captain
- Gustav Schwarzenegger (1907–1972), Austrian police chief and Nazi German military officer
- Gustaf Skarsgård (born 1980), Swedish actor
- Gustav Spörer (1822–1895), German astronomer
- Gustav Stickley (1858–1942), American furniture maker, invented the Mission style of Craftsman furniture
- Gustav Sule (1910–1942), Estonian javelin thrower
- Gustavus von Tempsky (1828–1868), Anglo-Prussian explorer and adventurer in New Zealand Wars
- Gustav Vigeland (1869–1943), Norwegian sculptor
- Gustaf Welin (1930–2008), Swedish Army lieutenant general
- Gustaf Wilson (1827–1905), Finnish-American pioneer and businessman
- Gustave Whitehead (1874–1927), German-American aviator
- Gustav Wood, vocalist in British rock band Young Guns
- Gustavs Zemgals (1871–1939), Latvian president 1927–1930
- Gustav Zeuner (1828–1907), German physicist and engineer
- Gustave de Molinari (1819–1912), Belgian political economist

== In fiction ==
- Gustav Graves, villain in the James Bond series
- Gustavo Fring, businessman and major narcotics distributor in the Breaking Bad franchise
- Gustav "Gus" Griswald, one of the six main characters of the 1990s show Recess and its three movies.
- Gustave, one of the main protagonists of the 2025 french role playing video game Clair Obscur: Expedition 33

== Other uses ==
- Gustave (crocodile), a large Nile crocodile in Burundi

== See also ==
- Carl Gustav (disambiguation)
- Gustafson
- Gustav line
- Gösta
