= Carl Gustav =

Carl Gustav refers to two kings of Sweden:

- Charles X Gustav (1622–1660), King of Sweden
- Carl XVI Gustaf (born 1946), King of Sweden

Carl or Charles Gustav may also refer to:

== People ==
=== Politicians ===
- Karl Gustav Abramsson (born 1947), Swedish politician
- Carl Gustaf Ekman (1872–1945), Swedish politician
- Carl Gustaf Löwenhielm (1790–1858), Swedish diplomat
- Carl Gustaf Nordin (1749–1812), Swedish statesman, historian and ecclesiastic
- Carl Gustaf Tessin (1695–1770), Swedish politician
- Karl Gustaf Westman (1876–1944), Swedish historian and politician

=== Athletes ===
- Carl Gustaf Lewenhaupt (1884–1935), Swedish horse rider
- Karl Gustaf Vinqvist (1883–1967), Swedish gymnast

=== Artists ===
- Carl Gustaf Hellqvist (1851–1890), Swedish painter
- Carl Gustaf Pilo (1711–1793), Swedish painter
- Carl Gustav Carus (1789–1869), German physiologist and painter

=== Entertainers ===
- Carl-Gustaf Lindstedt (1921–1992), Swedish actor
- Karl Gustav Ahlefeldt (1910–1985), Danish film actor

=== Medicine ===
- Carl Gustav Carus (1789–1869), German physiologist and painter
- Karl Gustav Himly (1772–1837), German surgeon and optician
- Carl Gustav Jung (1875–1961), Swiss founder of analytical psychology

=== Military leaders ===
- Carl Gustaf Armfeldt (1666–1736), Swedish military commander
- Carl Gustaf Emil Mannerheim (1867– 1951), Finnish military commander and statesman
- Carl Gustav Fleischer (1883–1942), Norwegian military commander
- Carl Gustav Rehnskiöld (1651–1722), Swedish military commander
- Carl Gustaf von Nieroth (died 1712), Swedish military commander
- Carl-Gustaf Ståhl (1920–2016), Swedish military commander
- Carl Gustaf Wrangel (1613–1676), Swedish military commander
- Karl Gustaf Brandberg (1905–1997), Swedish military commander
- Karl Gustav von Löwenwolde (died 1735), Russian diplomat and military commander
- Charles Gustav of Baden-Durlach (1648–1703), German general

=== Science and medicine ===
- Carl Gustaf Mosander (1797–1858), Swedish chemist
- Carl-Gustaf Regårdh (1921–2009), Swedish engineer
- Carl-Gustaf Rossby (1898–1957), Swedish-American meteorologist
- Carl Gustaf Thomson (1824–1899), Swedish entomologist
- Carl Gustaf von Mannerheim (1797–1854), Finnish entomologist
- Carl Gustav Witt (1866–1946), German astronomer

=== Other persons ===
- Carl Gustaf Hellquist (1896–1973), Swedish jurist
- Carl Gustav Jacob Jacobi (1804–1851), German mathematician
- Karl Gustav Homeyer (1795–1874), German jurist
- Carl Gustaf von Rosen (1909–1977), Swedish aviator
- Carl Gustaf Wolff (1800–1868), Finnish shipowner and businessman

== Weaponry ==
- Carl Gustafs Stads Gevärsfaktori, a Swedish armaments company
- Carl Gustaf 20 mm recoilless rifle, an anti-tank weapon
- Carl Gustaf 84 mm recoilless rifle, an anti-tank weapon
- Carl Gustaf m/45, a submachine gun
