= Carl Wolff =

Carl Wolff may refer to:

- Carl Gustaf Wolff (1800–1868), Finnish shipowner and businessman
- Carl Heinz Wolff (1884–1942), German screenwriter, producer and film director
