= Union for Reform Judaism =

Organization of Reform Judaism in North America

- Abbreviation: URJ
- Theology: Reform Judaism
- President: Rabbi Richard Jacobs
- Associations: World Union for Progressive Judaism
- Region: United States and Canada
- Headquarters: 633 Third Avenue, New York City
- Founder: Isaac Mayer Wise
- Origin: July 8, 1873; Melodeon Hall, Cincinnati, Ohio
- Congregations: 831
- Members: ~880,000 affiliates 600,000–1,150,000 identifying
- Official website: www.urj.org

The Union for Reform Judaism (URJ), formerly known as the Union of American Hebrew Congregations (UAHC) until 2003, founded in 1873 by Rabbi Isaac Mayer Wise, is the congregational arm of Reform Judaism in North America. The other two arms established by Rabbi Wise are the Hebrew Union College-Jewish Institute of Religion and the Central Conference of American Rabbis. The current president of the URJ is Rabbi Rick Jacobs.

The URJ has an estimated constituency of some 880,000 registered adults in 819 congregations. It claims to represent 2.2 million, as over a third of adult American Jews, including many who are not synagogue members, state affinity with Reform, making it the largest Jewish denomination. The UAHC was a founding member of the World Union for Progressive Judaism, of which the URJ is the largest constituent by far.

== History ==
=== 19th century ===
Reform-like ideas in the United States were first expressed by the Reformed Society of Israelites, founded in Charleston, South Carolina, on 21 November 1824. It was led by Isaac Harby, Abraham Moise, and David Nunes Carvalho, who represented the younger, Americanized, and religiously lax generation in the Congregation Kahal Kadosh Beth Elohim. Standing in opposition to a more stringent establishment, formed from English-born immigrants, Harby and his followers were mainly concerned with decorum. They demanded English-language sermons, synagogue affairs handled in English rather than Early Modern Spanish (as was prevalent among Western Sephardim), and so forth. However, they also arrived at more principled issues. On their first anniversary, Harby delivered an oratory in which he declared Rabbinic Judaism a demented faith, no longer relevant, and that America was "the Promised Land of Scripture." They fully seceded by their second anniversary, after continued rebuffs on the part of the wardens, forming their own prayer group. They met in Seyle's Hall, a rental facility, as they were unable to raise sufficient funds for a new synagogue. Their services also included a choir, hymns, and instrumental music. Men did not cover their heads either. The three leaders authored a prayerbook in which they completely excised any mention of the Messiah, restoration of sacrifices, and return to Zion. It was published in 1830. Far more moderate alterations along these lines, in the first liturgy considered Reformed, caused an uproar at Hamburg in 1818.

The Society, numbering several dozens, dissipated and merged back into Beth Elohim during 1833, but they did not cease being a factor. In 1836, the reunified congregation hired Gustavus Poznanski as cantor. He spent time in Hamburg and knew the rite of the Hamburg Temple. Traditional at first, Poznanski soon followed a different course. In 1843 he attempted to abolish the Second Day of Festivals and later published his own version of the Maimonides' Creed, which lacked reference to Resurrection of the Dead and the Messiah. He also instituted various ritual reforms. Supported by many of the former secessionists, he eventually resigned in 1847.

A year before that, Isaac Mayer Wise arrived from Europe. In a country where Jewish immigrants lacked an organized and established religious leadership, Wise quickly rose to prominence. While far from traditional belief, he was disinterested in offering a comprehensive new approach, focusing on pragmatic compromises. Wise introduced family pews for the first time in known synagogue history (by random, when his congregation bought a church) in Albany on Shabbat Shuvah, 3 October 1851. His attempts to forge a single American Judaism motivated him to seek agreement with the conservative Isaac Leeser. Relations between them, wrought with suspicion from the beginning, were terminated after Wise agreed to Leeser's demands in the 1855 Cleveland Synod and then retracted when the latter left. Wise was soon outflanked by the radical Reform rabbi David Einhorn, who espoused a dogmatic, rigid line demanding conformity with the principles of Reform Judaism then formulated in Germany. Many other German rabbis crossed the ocean to the land where their religious outlook, free from state intervention or communal pressures, could be expressed purely.

Einhorn gradually gained the upper hand, though the conflict-laden synergy between him and Wise would lay the foundation of American Reform. The Philadelphia Conference of 3–6 November 1869 saw the radicals' victory, and the adoption of a platform which summarized the theory concocted in Germany in the previous decades. Priestly privileges were abolished, as the rebuilding of the Temple was no longer anticipated; belief in the Messiah and Resurrection was denied. Michael Meyer regarded the document as the denominational "declaration of independence." The need for religious divorce (get) was also annulled, and civil divorce confirmed as sufficient, one of the first steps towards abandonment of most ritual traditions. While American Jews, even the nominally Orthodox, were scarcely observant, Reform began to officially dispose of practices still upheld. Its doctrine was well received by the immigrants and especially their assimilated children. Of 200 synagogues in the United States in 1860, there were a handful of Reform ones. Twenty years later, almost all of the existing 275 were part of the movement. On 8 July 1873, representatives from 34 congregations met in Melodeon Hall, Cincinnati, Ohio, and formed the Union of American Hebrew Congregations (UAHC) under Wise's auspices. The name reflected his hope to unite all Jews under a single roof. The UAHC continued to grow throughout the following years. By 1879 it consisted of 118 congregations, which was more than half of known congregations in the United States, including synagogues such as Emanu-El and Beth El in New York.

In 1875, Wise also founded Hebrew Union College. Yet his attempts to maintain a moderate façade failed. In a famous incident, on 11 July 1883, during the banquet celebrating the first graduation from HUC, non-kosher food such as shrimps and crabs was served. The so-called trefa banquet, while apparently the decision of the Jewish caterer and not of Wise himself (who observed dietary laws), prompted protests from the few American traditionalists, like Sabato Morais, who remained outside the UAHC. Several conservative members later claimed to have exited the room with repulsion, though little is factually known about the incident.

It was the arrival of Rabbi Alexander Kohut in 1885 which forced an unambiguous stance. Kohut, a follower of Zecharias Frankel and his Positive-Historical School, attacked the UAHC for abandoning traditional Judaism. A series of heated exchanges between him and Reform's chief ideologue, Rabbi Kaufmann Kohler, encouraged the latter to convene an assembly which accepted the Pittsburgh Platform on 19 November. Embodying the spirit of "Classical Reform", it added virtually nothing to the theoretical foundation of the movement but elucidated it clearly. It was declared that "to-day we accept as binding only the moral laws, and maintain only such ceremonies as elevate and sanctify our lives." A small group of conservatives withdrew from the UAHC in protest, joining Kohut, Morais, and their supporters in founding the Jewish Theological Seminary. At first unifying almost all non-Reform currents, it developed into the center of Conservative Judaism. In 1889, Wise founded the Central Conference of American Rabbis.

=== 20th century ===
"Classical Reform" soon faced a more pressing challenge. The massive immigration from Eastern Europe, bringing over two million Jews who had strong traditional sentiments in matters of religion even when personally lax, dwarfed the UAHC constituency within a generation. In the 1910s and 1920s, the CCAR rabbis gradually reintroduced many elements once discarded in an effort to appeal to the newcomers. The influx, and the growth of interwar antisemitism, also brought a renewed stress on Jewish particularism and peoplehood, ritual, and tradition.

In contrast with the coolness toward Zionism expressed by Classicists – emanating both from their rejection of old Messianic belief, involving a restoration of the sacrificial cult in Jerusalem, and commitment to emancipation – many new clergymen, like Abba Hillel Silver and Stephen Wise, were enthusiastic and influential Zionists. These tendencies were codified in the 1937 Columbus Declaration of Principles, influenced by rabbis Samuel S. Cohon, Solomon Freehof and others from Eastern Europe. Anti-Zionist Reform rabbis broke away during WWII to found the American Council for Judaism, which declined in activity following the Six-Day War.

In 1950, HUC merged with the Jewish Institute of Religion, a Reform rabbinical college founded in 1922 by Rabbi Stephen Wise. The selective "return to tradition" encouraged many Americanized Eastern-European-descended Jews to flock to Reform congregations in the postwar years, rapidly swelling the membership ranks of the UAHC. This factor, along with the URJ's commitment to Outreach, diversity ("big tent Judaism"), and a welcoming attitude labeled "Audacious Hospitality" by URJ president, Rabbi Richard Jacobs, have all contributed to the Reform Movement's emergence as the largest Jewish religious denomination in North America.

The HUC, as a member of the National Community Relations Advisory Council, opposed the Rosenberg Committee, believing them to be a Communist group. In 1953, the council issued a statement that the Rosenberg Committee's accusation that the Rosenberg trial was motivated by antisemitism was causing public panic within the Jewish community.

In 1990, the Union of American Hebrew Congregations and other major Jewish-American organizations asked that Nelson Mandela clarify his pro-Palestinian views prior to his visit to New York City. The UAHC's senior vice president Albert Vorspan said that "We are hoping to clear the air and defuse the situation so that Mandela's visit...is what it ought to be: a great welcome for a liberation hero without a lot of marginal controversy." In a meeting in Geneva that included representatives from the Union of American Hebrew Congregations, the Anti-Defamation League, the American Jewish Committee, the American Jewish Congress, and other organizations, Mandela apologized for offending the Jewish-American establishment, expressed appreciation for South African Jews who opposed apartheid, praised certain Israeli leaders, and agreed that the State of Israel had a right to exist.

In June, 2025, the URJ and Central Conference of American Rabbis issued a statement supporting Donald Trump's strikes against Iran. The statement said "One need not agree with the policies of the current Israeli or U.S. governments to express genuine gratitude for this dramatic intervention." The URJ co-signed a statement from the Conference of Presidents of Major American Jewish Organizations expressing deep gratitude for Donald Trump's strikes. However, the Reform movement's Central Conference of American Rabbis did not sign the statement due to time constraints.

== Beliefs ==
Reform Judaism, also known as Liberal or Progressive Judaism, embraces several basic tenets, including a belief in a theistic, personal God; continuous revelation, with the view that scripture was written by divinely inspired humans. The Reform movement upholds the autonomy of the individual to form their own Jewish beliefs, and to be the final arbiter of their own spiritual practices. At the same time, Reform Judaism stresses Jewish learning in order to gain insights into the tradition and make informed choices. The Reform movement also encourages its members to participate in synagogue and communal Jewish life. Reform Judaism draws a distinction between the moral and ethical imperatives of Judaism and traditional ritual requirements and practices, which, it believes may be altered or renewed to better fulfill Judaism's higher function. Another central tenet of Reform Judaism is the belief that it is the universal mission of Jews to spread God's message, to be a light unto the nations. Reform Judaism foresees a future Messianic Age of peace, but without the coming of an individual Messiah or the restoration of the Third Temple and sacrificial cult in Jerusalem. Reform Judaism rejects the notion of bodily resurrection of the dead at the end of days, while affirming, at most, immortality of the soul.

During its "Classical" era, roughly between the American Civil War and the 1930s, American Reform rejected many ceremonial aspects of Judaism and the authority of traditional jurisprudence (halakhah), favoring a more rationalistic, universalist view of religious life. "New Reform", from the 1937 Columbus Declaration of Principles and onwards, sought to reincorporate such elements and emphasize Jewish particularism, though still subject to personal autonomy. Concurrently, the denomination prioritized inclusiveness and diversification. This became especially pronounced after the adoption of "Big Tent Judaism" policy in the 1970s. Old ritual items became fashionable again, as were ceremonies, such as ablution. The liturgy, once abridged and containing much English, had more Hebrew and traditional formulae restored, though not due to theological concerns. In contrast with "Classical", "New Reform" abandoned the drive to equate religious expression with one's actual belief. Confirmation ceremonies in which the young were examined to prove knowledge in the faith, once ubiquitous, were mostly replaced by Bar and Bat Mitzvah, yet many adolescents still undergo Confirmation (often at Shavuot) between the ages of fourteen and eighteen. A unique aspect of Reform was its interpretation to the old rabbinic concept of Tikkun Olam (Repair of the World); it became a rallying cry for participation in various initiatives pursuing social justice and other progressive agendas, like the Civil Rights Movement, women's equality and gay rights.

Another key aspect of American Reform, which it shares with sister movements in the WUPJ, is its approach to Jewish identity. Interfaith marriage, once a taboo – the CCAR penalized any involvement by its clergy in such ceremonies by ordinances passed in 1909, 1947 and 1962 – were becoming more prevalent toward the end of the 20th Century. In 1979, the URJ adopted a policy of embracing the intermarried and their spouses, in the hope the latter would convert. In 1983, in the United States, it recognized Judaism based on patrilineal descent, affirming that offspring of a single Jewish parent (whether father or mother) would be accepted as inheriting his status if they would demonstrate affinity to the faith. Children of a Jewish mother who will not commit to Judaism were not to be considered Jewish. These measures made Reform the most hospitable to non-Jewish family members among major American denominations: in 2006, 17% of synagogue-member households had a converted spouse, and 26% an unconverted one. These policies also raised great tensions with the more traditional movements. Orthodox and Conservatives rejected the validity of Reform conversions already before that, though among the latter, the greater proclivity of CCAR rabbis to perform the process under halachic standards allowed for many such to be approved. Patrilineal descent caused a growing percentage of Reform constituency to be regarded as non-Jewish by the two other denominations.

=== Marriage ===
A 2000 resolution allows synagogues to decide about same-sex marriage.

== Organizational structure ==
The URJ incorporates 809 congregations in the United States and 27 in Canada. The Union consists of four administrative districts, West, East, South and Central, which in turn are divided into a total of 35 regional communities, comprising groups of local congregations; 34 are in the United States and one represents all those affiliated with the Canadian Council for Reform Judaism. The URJ is led by a board of trustees, consisting of 253 lay members. This board is overseen by the 5,000-member General Assembly, which convenes biennially. It was first assembled in Cleveland on 14 July 1874, and the most recent biennial was held in Chicago on 11–15 December 2019. The board directs the Senior Leadership Team, headed by the URJ President. Spiritual guidance is provided by the Central Conference of American Rabbis, which has some 2,300 clergy members who convene annually. Most CCAR members have been trained at Hebrew Union College-Jewish Institute of Religion, the Reform movement's seminary. The CCAR has a publishing arm and oversees various committees, such as those focusing on Ritual, Responsa, and Prayerbooks. Synagogue prayers are conducted mainly by members of the CCAR and of the American Conference of Cantors. The political and legislative outreach of the URJ is performed by the Religious Action Center based in Washington D.C. The RAC advocates policy positions based upon religious values, and is associated with political progressivism, as part of the vision for Tikkun Olam. Tikkun Olam in Hebrew means “repairing the world.” The denomination is also supported by the Women of Reform Judaism (formerly, the National Federation of Temple Sisterhoods).

The URJ has an estimated constituency of 850,000 in the United States, 760,000 Jews and further 90,000 non-converted gentile spouses. A greater number identifies with Reform Judaism without affiliating with a synagogue. The 2013 Pew survey assessed that 35% of Jews in the United States consider themselves Reform (the 2001 AJC poll cited 38%); based on these figures, Steven M. Cohen estimated there were 1,154,000 identifying non-member adults in addition to those registered, not including children. There are further 30,000 affiliated congregants in Canada. Citing those findings, the URJ claims to represent a total of 2.2 million individuals.

== Youth group and summer camps ==
Entrance sign for Camp Swig in Saratoga, California

NFTY exists to supplement and support Reform youth groups at the synagogue level. About 750 local youth groups affiliate themselves with the organization, comprising over 8,500 youth members.

The URJ Camp & Israel Programs is the largest Jewish camping system in the world, comprising 14 summer camps across North America, including specialty camps in science & technology, creative arts, and sports, and programs for youth with special needs. Many of the camps have long provided the opportunity for high school pupils to travel to Israel through the program Yallah! Israel during the summer. The Union offers various Israel programs for seminarians and students. Including a youth convention every other year.

=== KESHER ===
KESHER (from Hebrew קשר 'linkage', 'connection') is the now-defunct college outreach arm and campus student organization for Reform Judaism. It was formally disbanded in 2009, though it continued to operate Taglit Birthright Israel trips, under the brand "URJ Kesher" for several more years. There are no longer any official college programs run by the URJ.

Its directors included Paul Reichenbach (–1995), David Terdiman (1995–1997), Rabbi Jonathan Klein (1997–2000), Rabbi Andrew Davids, Rabbi Marc Israel, Lisa David (–2006); Nicole Rand was the latest acting director. There had been two program associates and an Israeli shaliach.

KESHER worked with organizations like Hillel to create Reform Jewish programs on campuses across North America. They were a member of the Israel Campus Coalition and sponsored the Argentina Ambassadors trip. KESHER also hosted a Leadership Training Seminar during the spring semester, coordinated by members of the KESHER Student Leadership Council. This council was made of 6-7 junior and senior students who applied each year for one or two terms (a school year). Through its website, the group disseminated many documents describing the connection between Reform Judaism and North American Jewish youth.

== See also ==
- Reform Judaism (magazine) – the Union's former official magazine
