= Gustava =

Gustava is a feminine form of Gustav or Gustavus. People with the name include:

- Gustava Aigner (1906–1987), Austrian geologist and palaeontologist
- Gustava Kielland (1800–1889), Norwegian author and missionary pioneer
- Gustava Johanna Stenborg (1776–1819), was a Swedish artist
