= Tidan (river) =

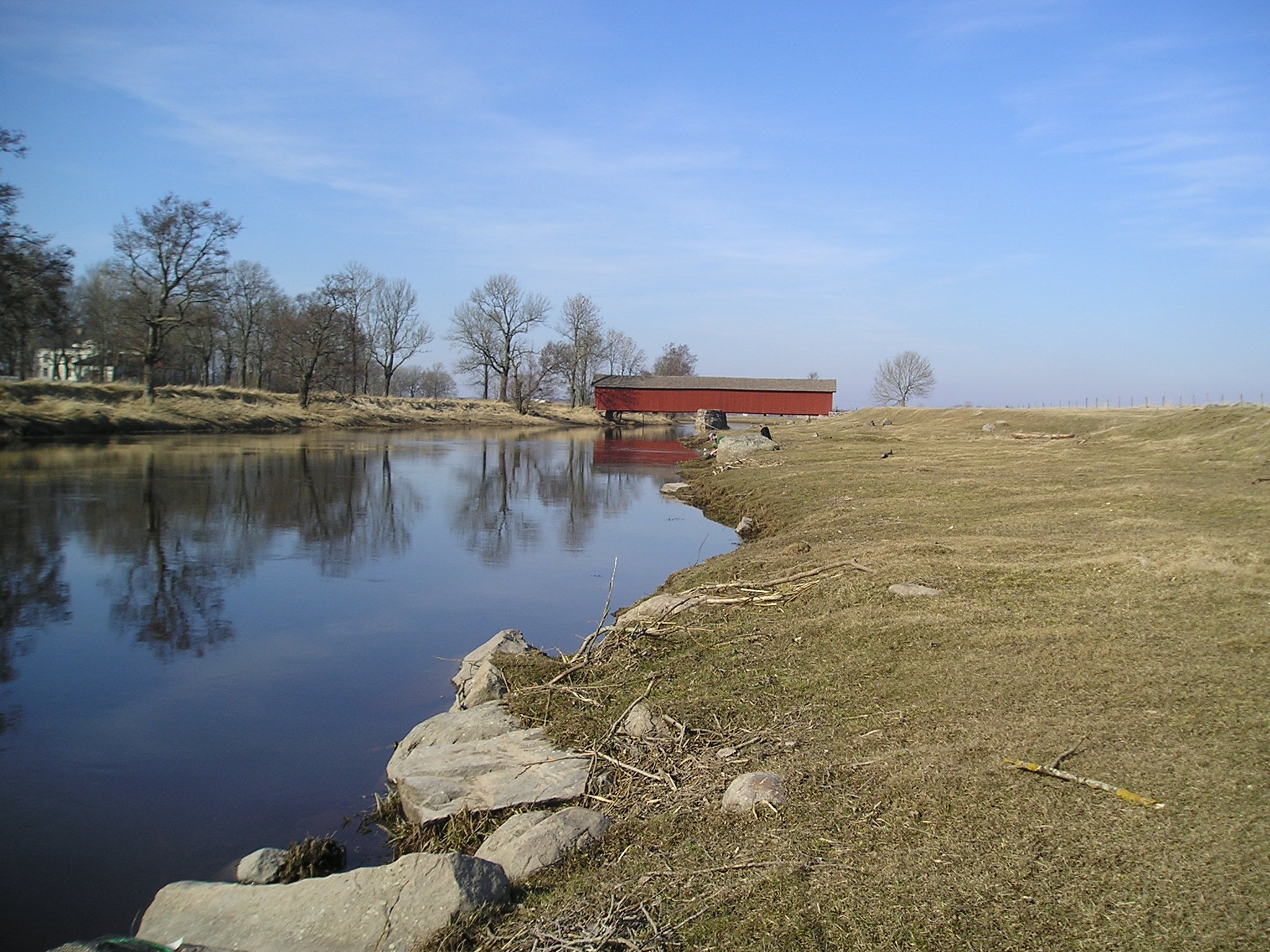
- Historical covered bridge

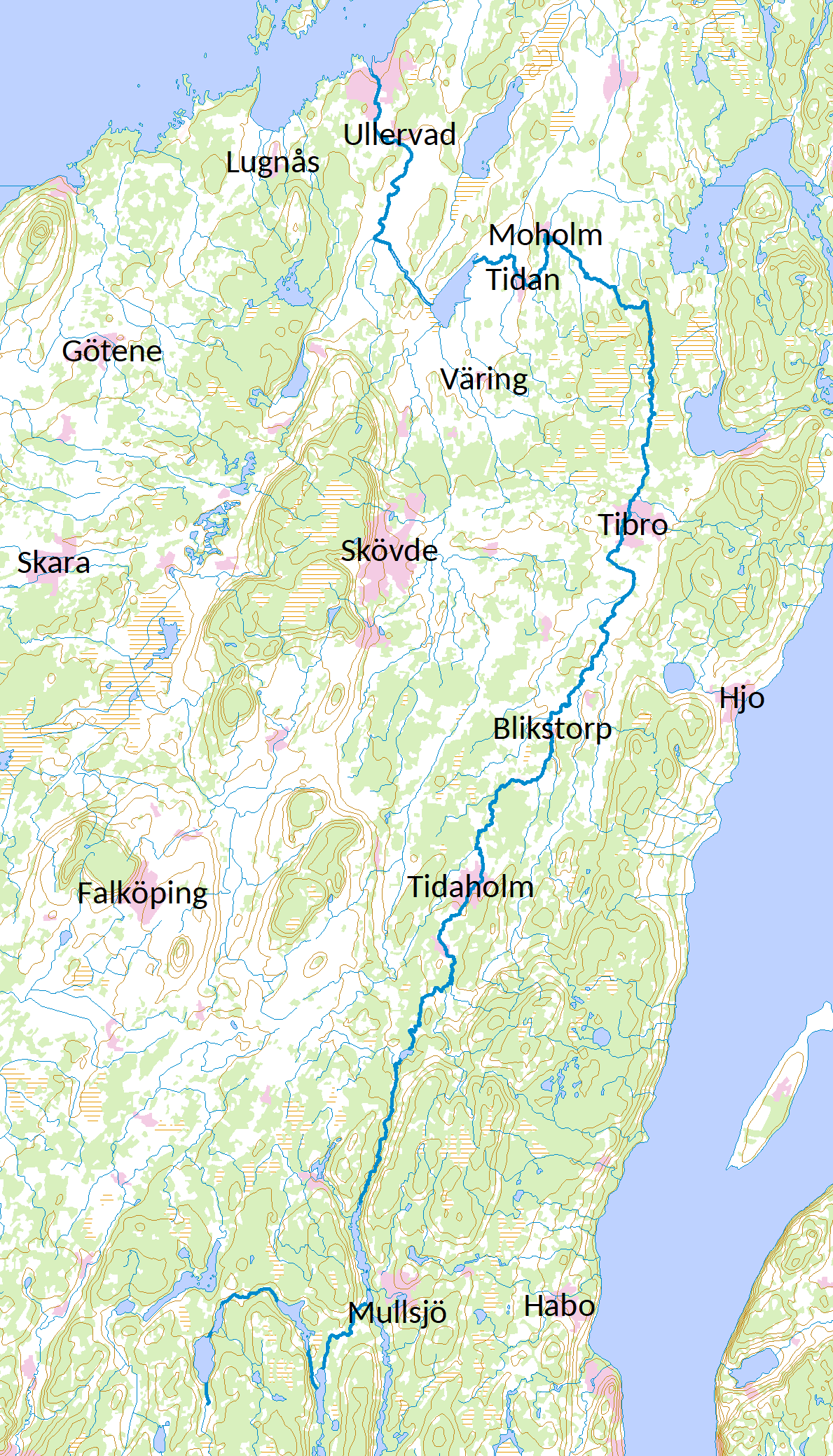
- Course of Tidan running north

Location
- Country: Sweden
- County: Västra Götaland County

Physical characteristics
- Mouth: Vänern
  - location: Mariestad, Västra Götaland County
  - coordinates: 58°42′50″N 13°49′00″E
  - elevation: 44 m (144 ft)
- Length: 140 km (87 mi)
- Basin size: 2,230 km^{2} (860 sq mi)
- Discharge
  - average: 20 m^{3}/s (710 cu ft/s)

Tidan is a river in Sweden. It is one of few Swedish rivers that flow north. The river can be canoed from Bottnaryd (+57.7724°N +13.8426°E) to Mariestad (+58.6921°N +13.8249°E), a trip that takes 7–10 days.

== Gallery ==
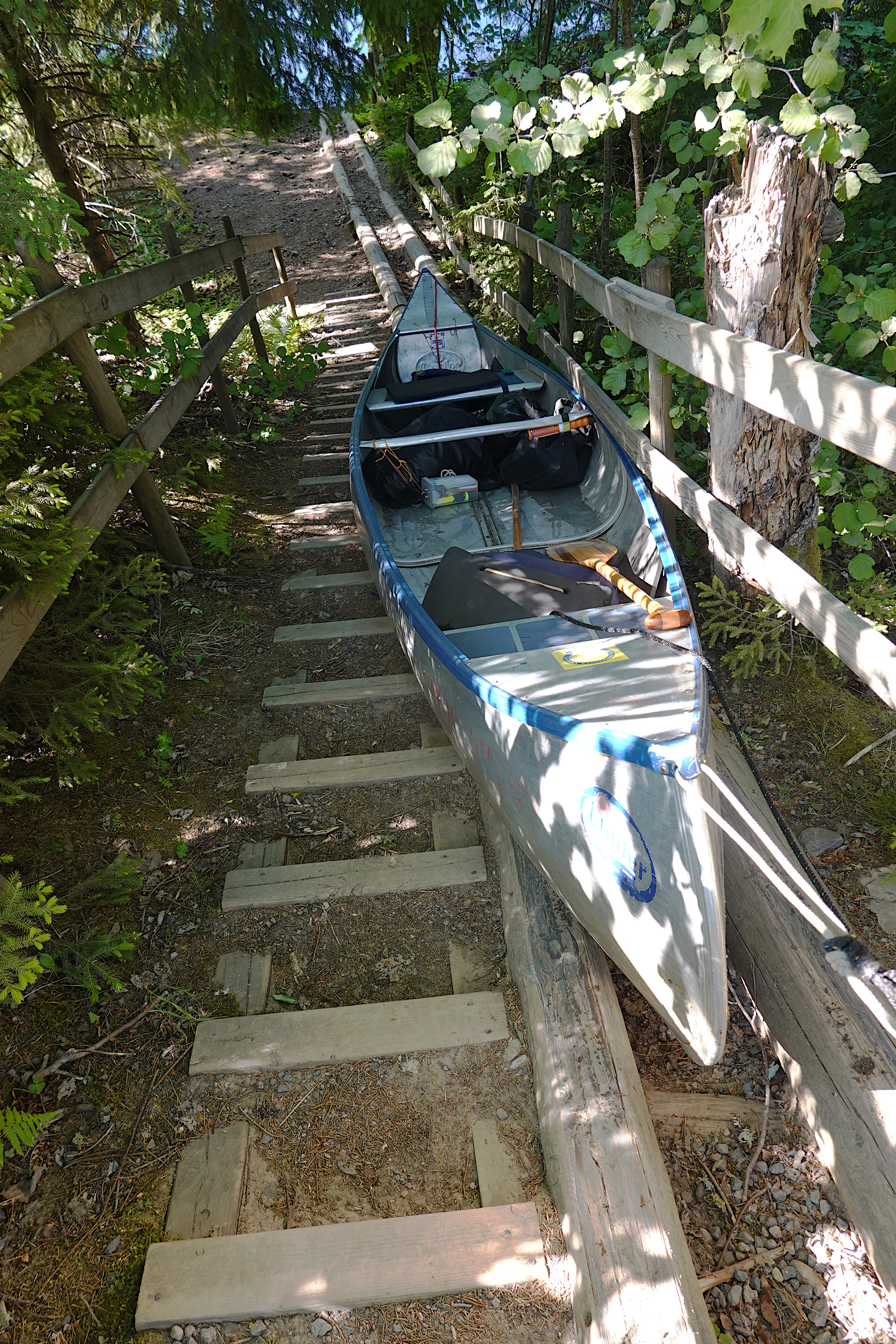
Canoe portage on the Tidan River using timber skids, nearby to road bridge F1838

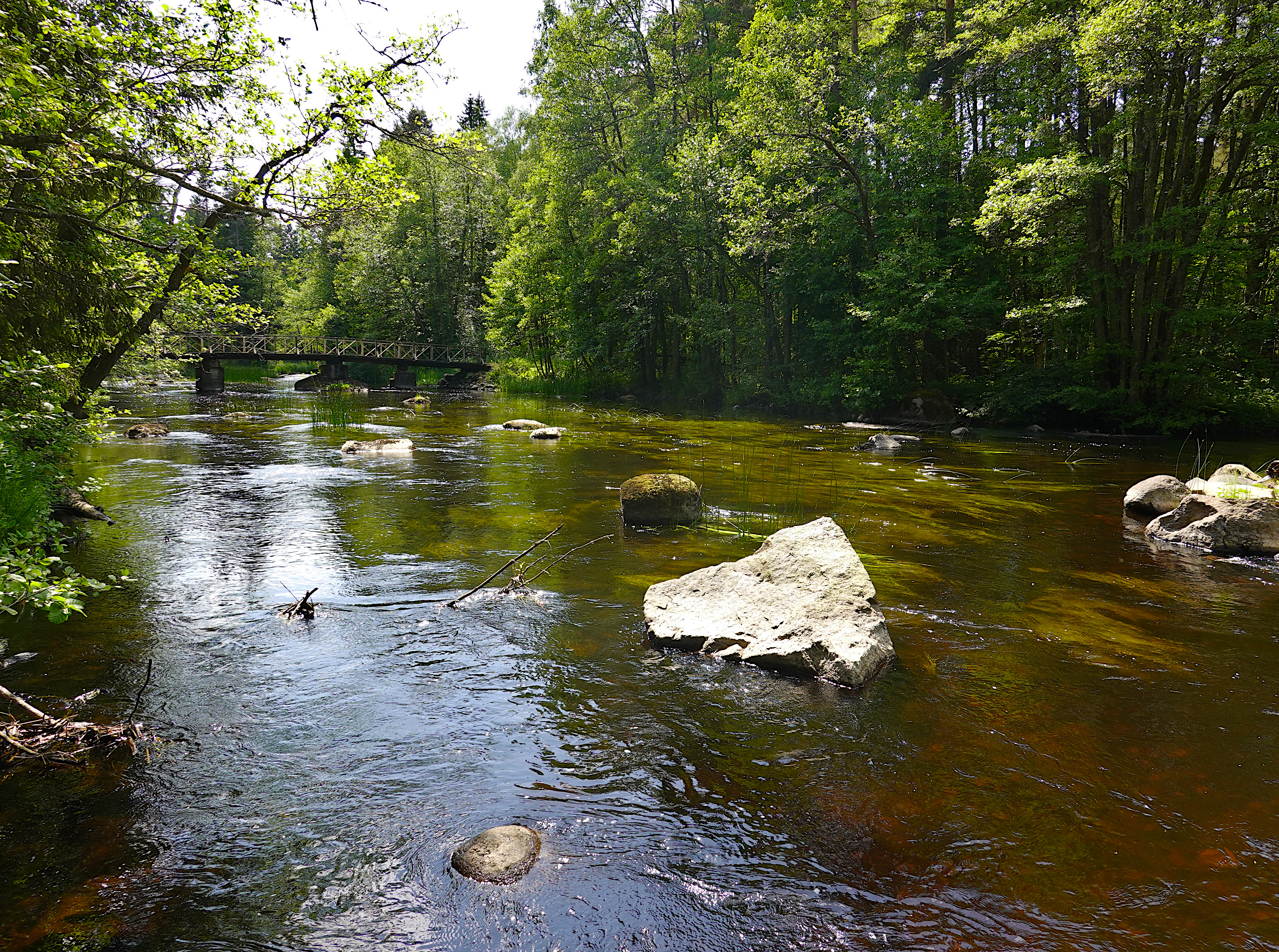
Tidan River in Ettaks strömmar nature reserve, looking upstream with service bridge in background

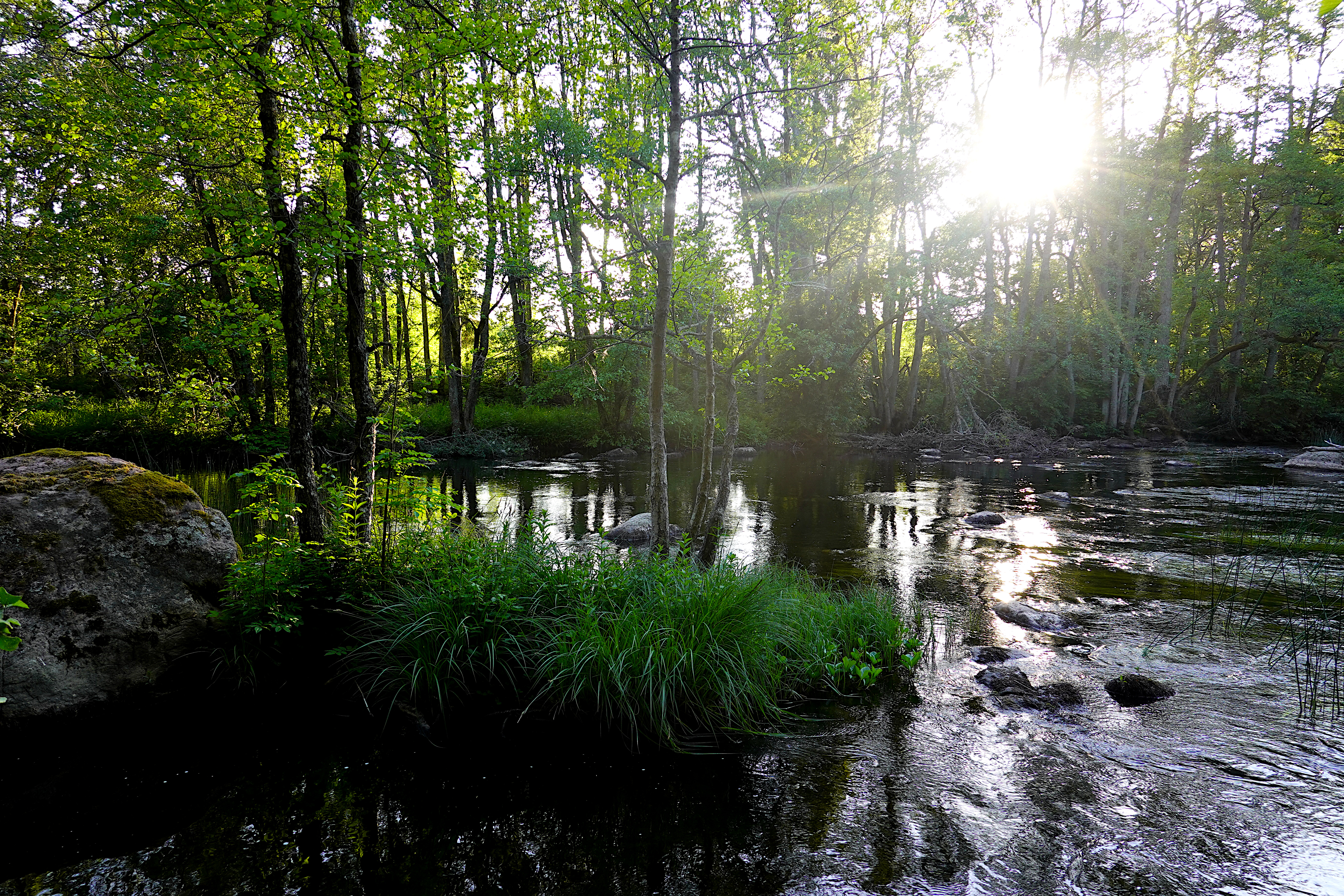
Tidan River looking upstream from east bank in Ettaks strömmar nature reserve

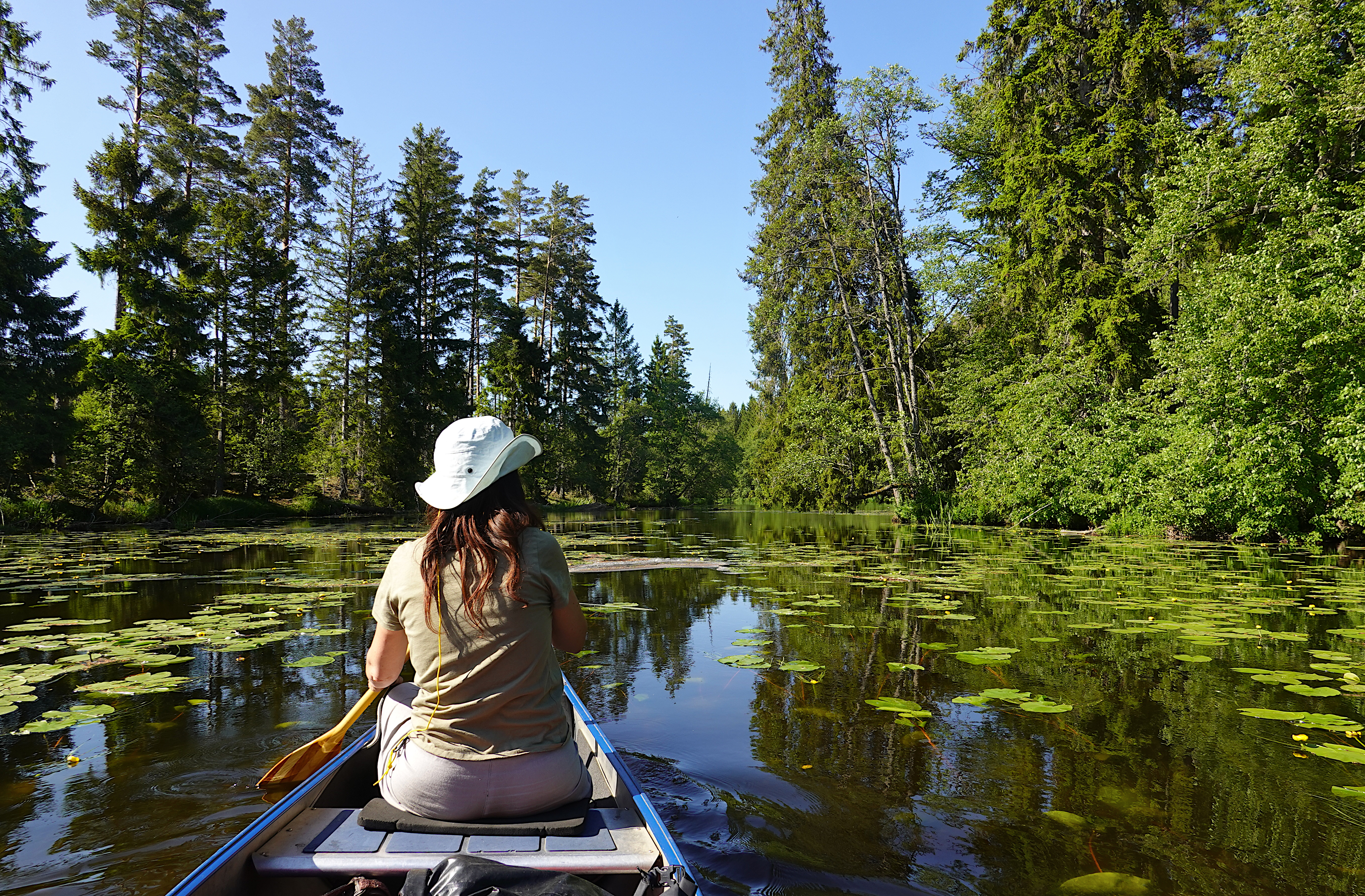
Canoeing the Tidan River near Lagerfors

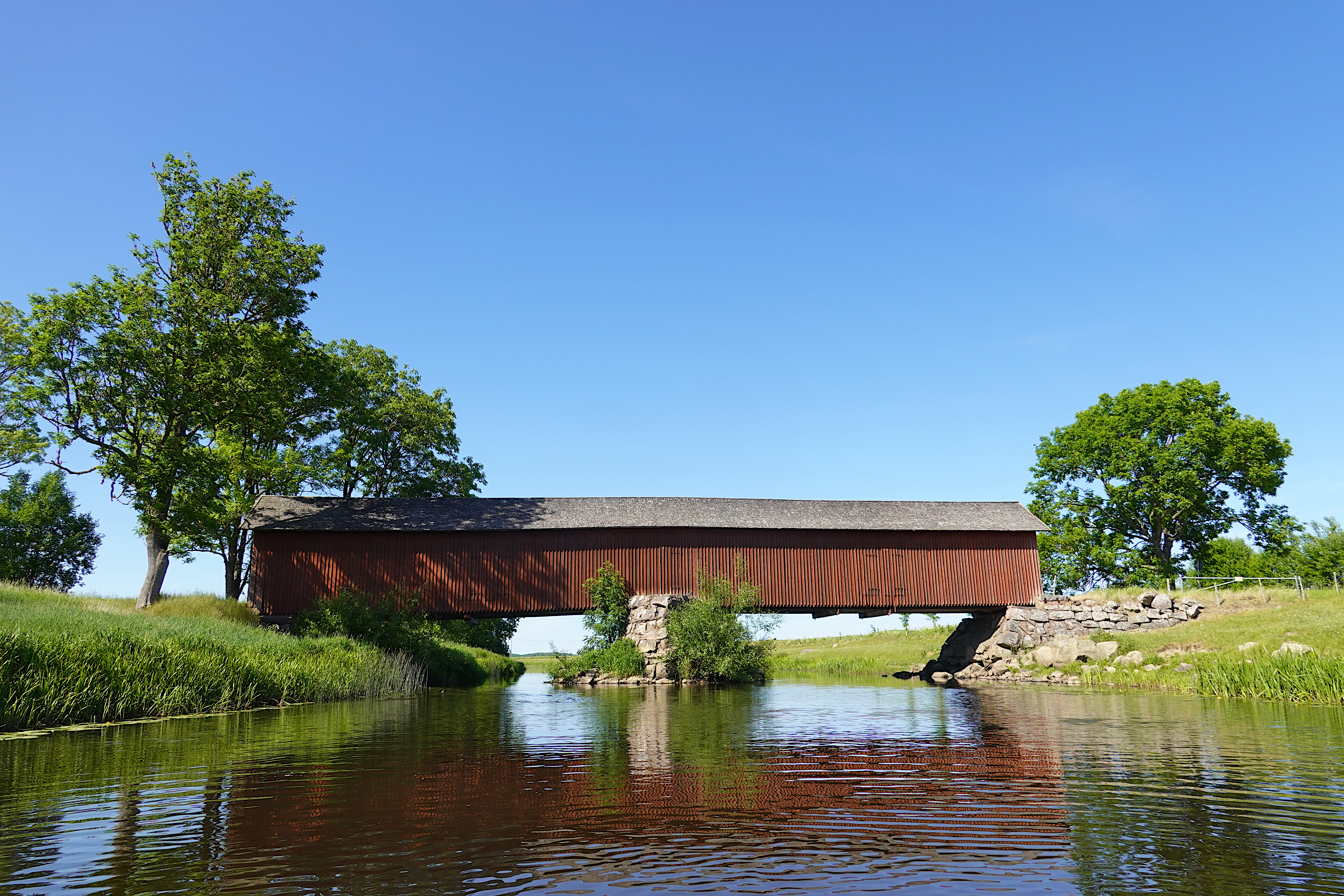
Historic covered bridge on the Tidan River

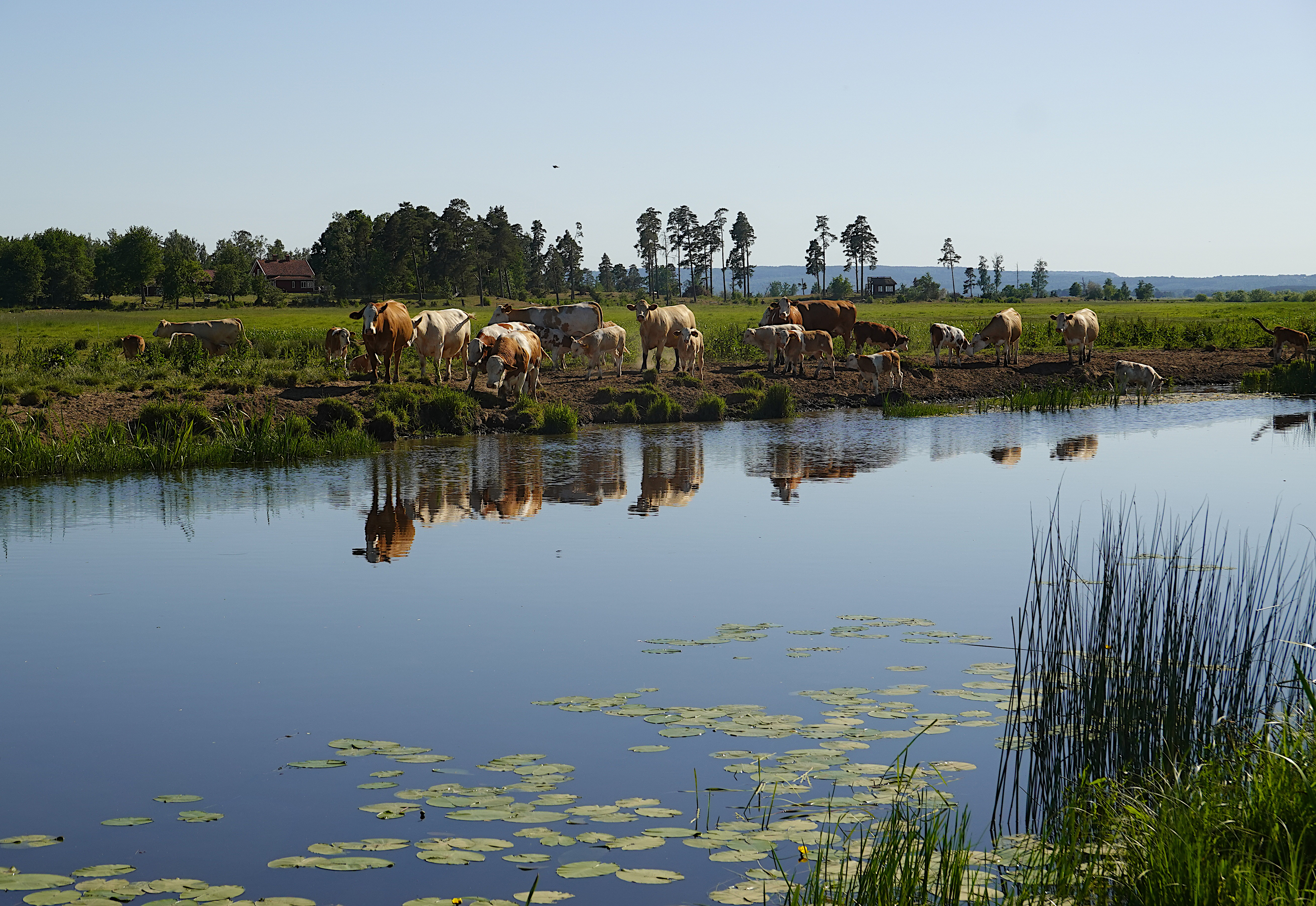
Cows grazing on banks of the Tidan River, within the bounds of the Östens naturreservat

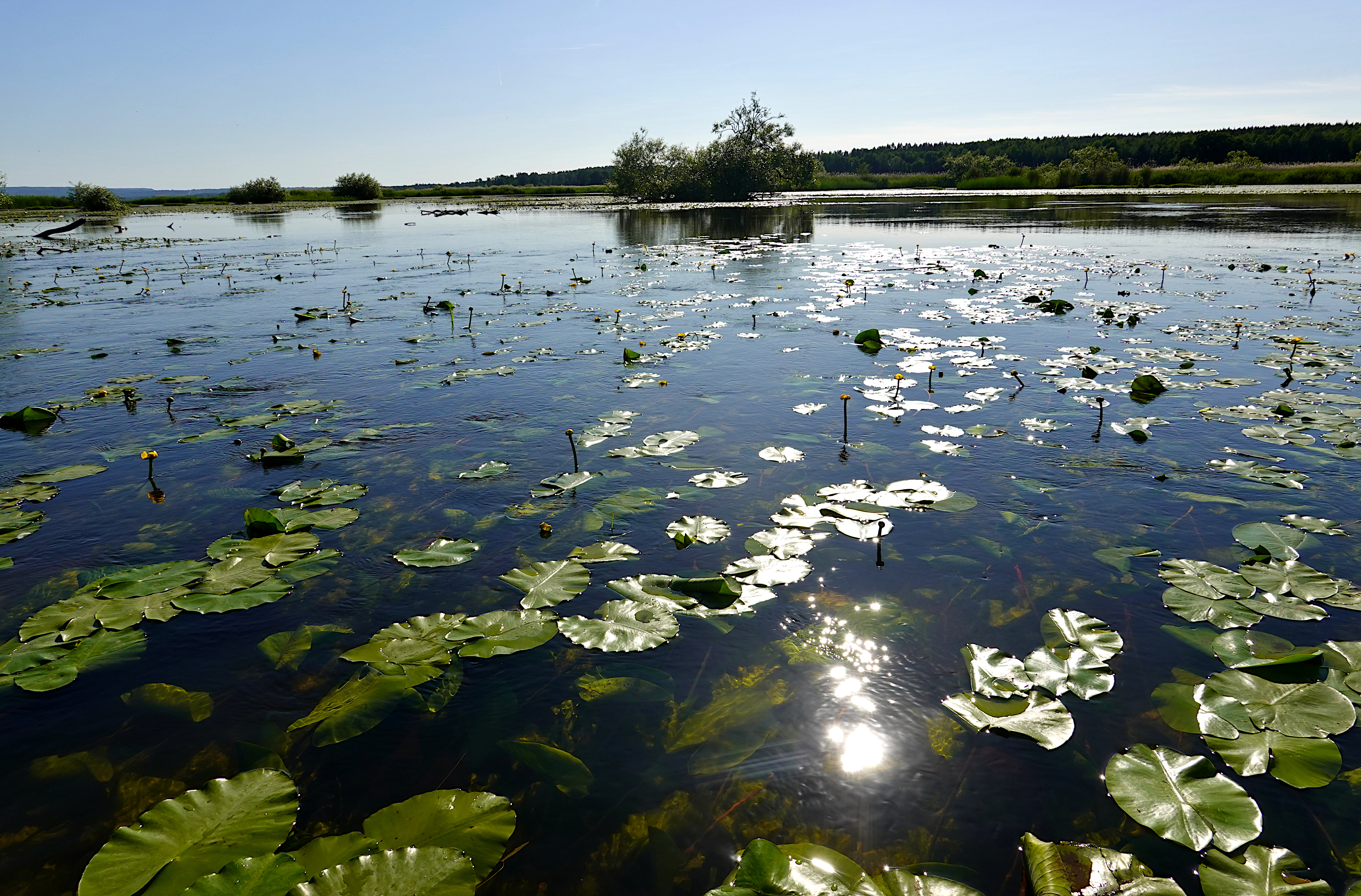
Lake Östen, a nature reserve in Sweden, looking approximately west

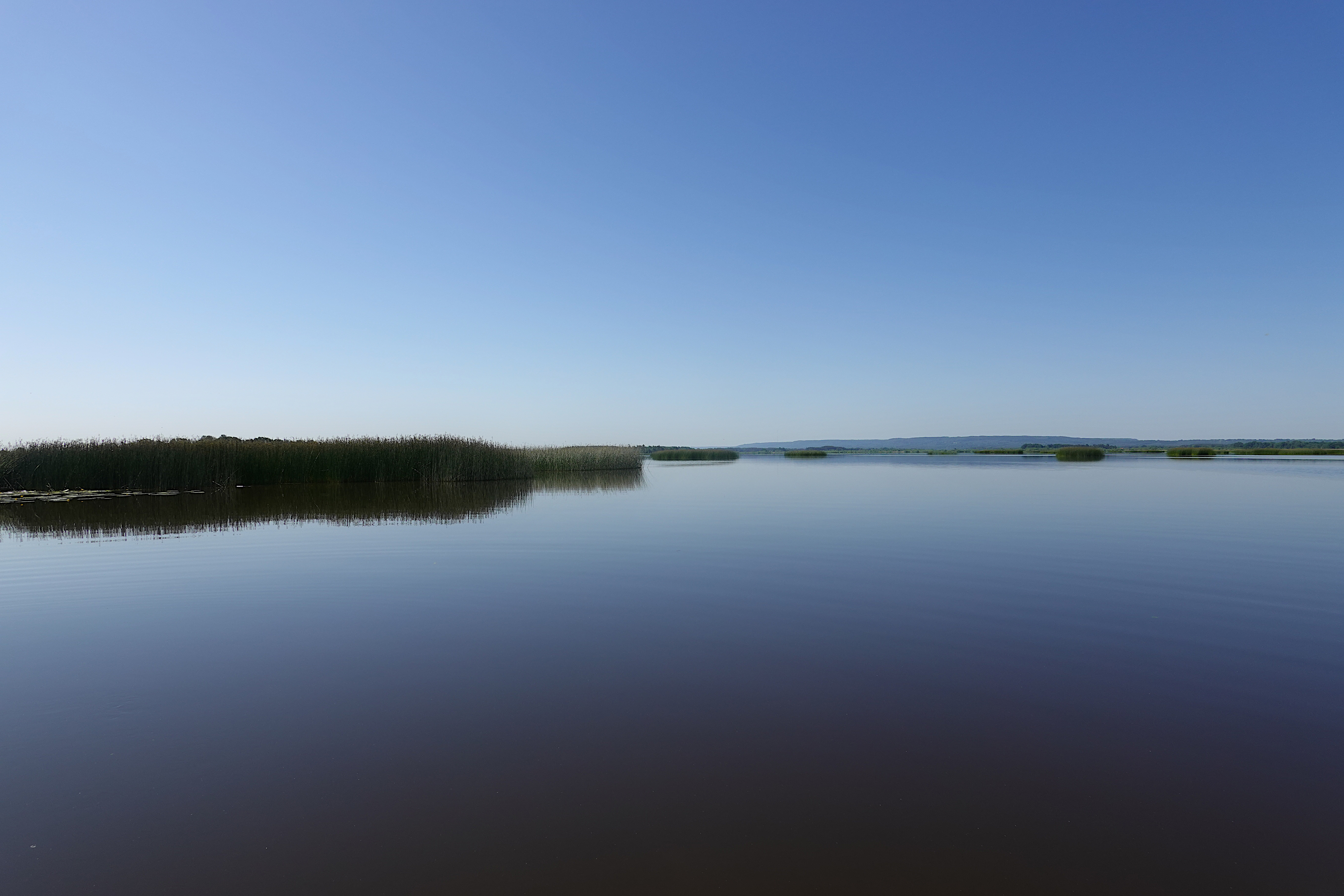
Lake Östen, a nature reserve on the Tidan River
