= Mariestad =

Place in Västergötland, Sweden

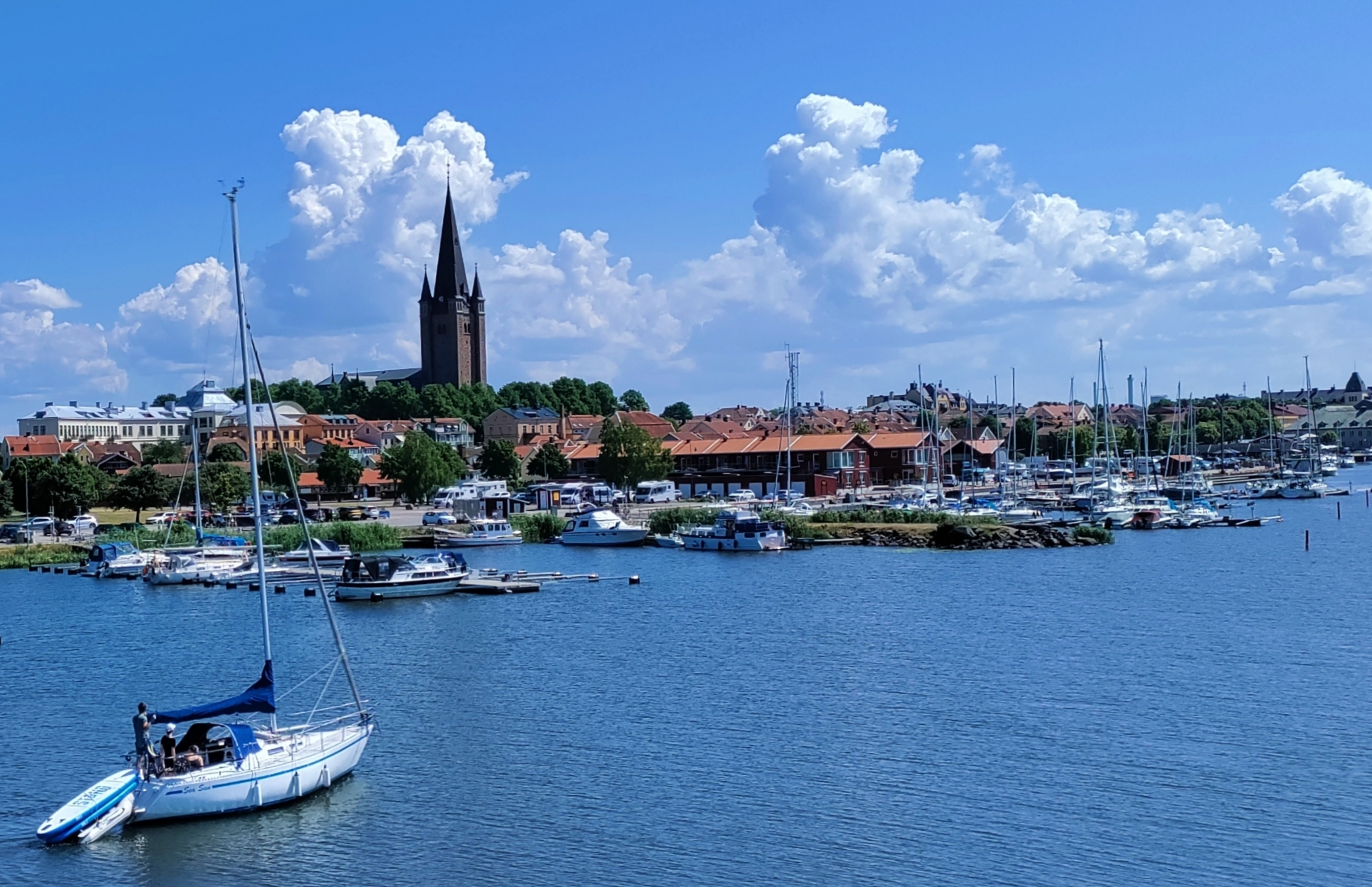
- Mariestad

- Location within Västra Götaland Location within Sweden
- Coordinates: 58°42′N 13°49′E
- Country: Sweden
- Province: Västergötland
- County: Västra Götaland County
- Municipality: Mariestad Municipality

Area
  - Total: 11.76 km^{2} (4.54 sq mi)

Population (31 December 2019)
  - Total: 16,611
  - Density: 1,413/km^{2} (3,660/sq mi)
- Time zone: UTC+1 (CET)
  - Summer (DST): UTC+2 (CEST)

Mariestad is a locality and the seat of Mariestad Municipality, Västra Götaland County, Sweden. It had 16,611 inhabitants in 2019. Until 1997 it was the capital of the former Skaraborg County and an episcopal see in the Church of Sweden between 1583 and 1646.

== History ==
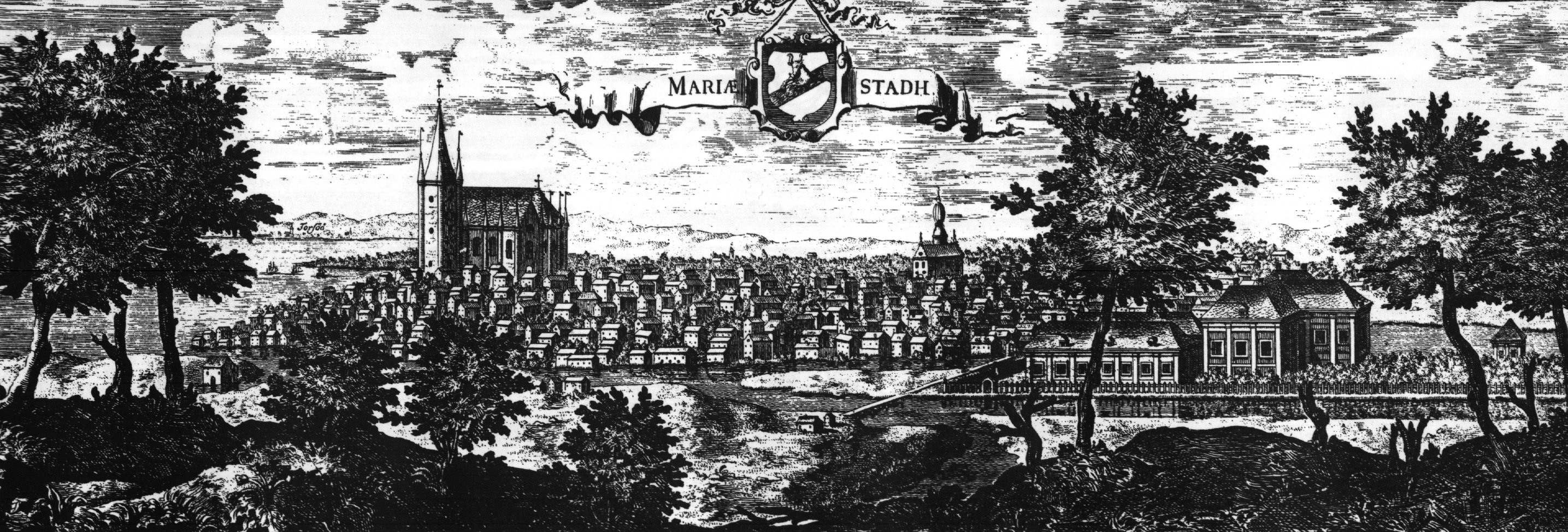
Mariestad c. 1700, in Suecia antiqua et hodierna.

The city was founded in 1583 by Duke Charles, who later became King Charles IX of Sweden. The city is named after his wife Marie of Pfalz. The coat of arms for Mariestad, an ox stepping out of the water, is said to be what Marie of Pfalz saw by the bay of Tidan in Mariestad when she first arrived there.

== Diocese ==
Mariestad is one of two Swedish cities with a cathedral without a bishop's seat, the other being Kalmar. For political reasons, the diocese of Mariestad was presided over by a superintendent rather than a bishop from 1583 until 1646, when the superintendent was moved to Karlstad and the diocese of Mariestad was absorbed by that of Skara.

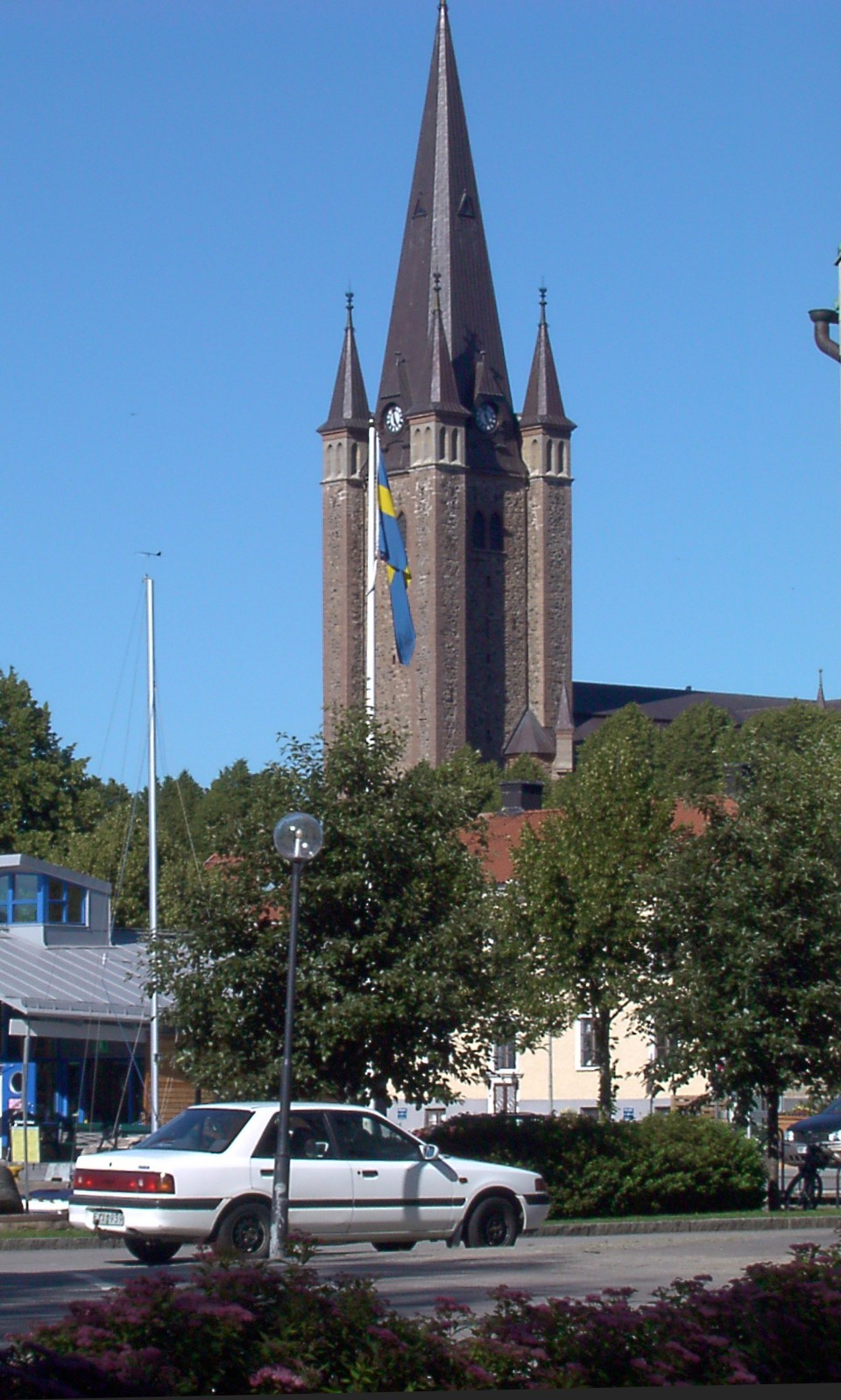
Mariestad Cathedral, 2003

== Notable natives ==
- Gustavus Schmidt (1795–1877), American lawyer and lecturer
- Axel Lindahl (1841–1906), photographer
- Dag Wennlund (born 1963), javelin thrower
- Evelyn Mok (born 1987), actress and comedian
- Helena Andersson
- Anni Dewani

== Sports ==
The following sports clubs are located in Mariestad:

- IFK Mariestad
- Mariestads BK
- Mariestad BoIS HC
- IBK Lockerud Mariestad
- Mariestads Motorklubb run a motorcycle speedway team called Örnarna at the Grevby Motorstadion.

== Climate ==
Mariestad has a maritime climate influenced by its position on lake Vänern and the relative proximity to the North Atlantic. The town has warmer weather than elsewhere in western Sweden due to the influence of Vänern counterbalancing the low-pressure systems from further west. Mariestad is also shielded behind the archipelago and the peninsula to its west, which makes it warmer than areas further southwest on the lake shore. This leads to sunny summers with average afternoon temperatures being about 23 °C (73 °F). Summer nights are very mild by inland standards due to the lake influence. Winters are often mild with infrequent snow cover with the lake being large enough to provide further moderation of cold snaps compared to towns on the east coast like Norrköping and Nyköping on the same latitude. Vänern often remains in a liquid state during winters due to mild temperatures.

Climate data for Mariestad (1991-2020; extremes since 1958)
Month	Jan	Feb	Mar	Apr	May	Jun	Jul	Aug	Sep	Oct	Nov	Dec	Year
Record high °C (°F)	10.7 (51.3)	13.1 (55.6)	18.3 (64.9)	27.2 (81.0)	30.0 (86.0)	31.0 (87.8)	34.3 (93.7)	34.7 (94.5)	27.2 (81.0)	22.6 (72.7)	17.8 (64.0)	12.5 (54.5)	34.7 (94.5)
Mean maximum °C (°F)	7.4 (45.3)	7.4 (45.3)	12.4 (54.3)	19.7 (67.5)	25.3 (77.5)	27.4 (81.3)	29.1 (84.4)	28.0 (82.4)	22.8 (73.0)	16.4 (61.5)	11.4 (52.5)	8.4 (47.1)	30.4 (86.7)
Mean daily maximum °C (°F)	1.7 (35.1)	1.9 (35.4)	5.6 (42.1)	11.6 (52.9)	17.0 (62.6)	20.5 (68.9)	22.8 (73.0)	21.8 (71.2)	17.1 (62.8)	11.0 (51.8)	6.0 (42.8)	3.1 (37.6)	11.7 (53.1)
Daily mean °C (°F)	−0.5 (31.1)	−0.7 (30.7)	1.9 (35.4)	6.7 (44.1)	11.7 (53.1)	15.5 (59.9)	17.9 (64.2)	17.0 (62.6)	13.0 (55.4)	7.9 (46.2)	3.8 (38.8)	0.8 (33.4)	7.9 (46.2)
Mean daily minimum °C (°F)	−2.7 (27.1)	−3.2 (26.2)	−1.3 (29.7)	2.6 (36.7)	7.2 (45.0)	11.1 (52.0)	13.7 (56.7)	13.1 (55.6)	9.5 (49.1)	5.2 (41.4)	1.8 (35.2)	−1.4 (29.5)	4.7 (40.5)
Mean minimum °C (°F)	−12.0 (10.4)	−12.1 (10.2)	−8.5 (16.7)	−3.4 (25.9)	1.4 (34.5)	6.4 (43.5)	9.7 (49.5)	8.4 (47.1)	3.2 (37.8)	−2.0 (28.4)	−5.3 (22.5)	−10.2 (13.6)	−15.4 (4.3)
Record low °C (°F)	−26.5 (−15.7)	−31.5 (−24.7)	−23.1 (−9.6)	−12.5 (9.5)	−3.3 (26.1)	1.1 (34.0)	4.5 (40.1)	2.2 (36.0)	−2.4 (27.7)	−11.0 (12.2)	−18.7 (−1.7)	−22.2 (−8.0)	−31.5 (−24.7)
Average precipitation mm (inches)	40.5 (1.59)	35.5 (1.40)	28.1 (1.11)	35.3 (1.39)	48.4 (1.91)	72.8 (2.87)	72.4 (2.85)	72.2 (2.84)	53.2 (2.09)	58.2 (2.29)	50.9 (2.00)	46.7 (1.84)	614.2 (24.18)
Source: SMHI Open Data

Climate data for Mariestad (2002–2021 averages & extremes)
Month	Jan	Feb	Mar	Apr	May	Jun	Jul	Aug	Sep	Oct	Nov	Dec	Year
Record high °C (°F)	10.7 (51.3)	13.1 (55.6)	18.3 (64.9)	23.9 (75.0)	30.0 (86.0)	31.0 (87.8)	34.3 (93.7)	34.7 (94.5)	27.2 (81.0)	22.6 (72.7)	17.8 (64.0)	12.5 (54.5)	34.7 (94.5)
Mean maximum °C (°F)	7.4 (45.3)	7.7 (45.9)	12.7 (54.9)	19.2 (66.6)	25.3 (77.5)	28.0 (82.4)	29.4 (84.9)	28.1 (82.6)	23.5 (74.3)	16.6 (61.9)	11.9 (53.4)	8.5 (47.3)	30.8 (87.4)
Mean daily maximum °C (°F)	1.6 (34.9)	1.9 (35.4)	5.8 (42.4)	12.0 (53.6)	17.1 (62.8)	21.2 (70.2)	23.2 (73.8)	21.9 (71.4)	17.6 (63.7)	11.1 (52.0)	6.4 (43.5)	3.2 (37.8)	11.9 (53.5)
Daily mean °C (°F)	−0.7 (30.7)	−0.7 (30.7)	2.3 (36.1)	7.4 (45.3)	12.3 (54.1)	16.4 (61.5)	18.6 (65.5)	17.6 (63.7)	13.8 (56.8)	8.2 (46.8)	4.3 (39.7)	1.2 (34.2)	8.4 (47.1)
Mean daily minimum °C (°F)	−2.9 (26.8)	−3.2 (26.2)	−1.3 (29.7)	2.7 (36.9)	7.5 (45.5)	11.5 (52.7)	14.0 (57.2)	13.2 (55.8)	9.9 (49.8)	5.3 (41.5)	2.2 (36.0)	−0.9 (30.4)	4.8 (40.7)
Mean minimum °C (°F)	−12.2 (10.0)	−11.4 (11.5)	−8.3 (17.1)	−2.8 (27.0)	1.8 (35.2)	7.0 (44.6)	10.1 (50.2)	8.4 (47.1)	3.6 (38.5)	−1.8 (28.8)	−5.3 (22.5)	−9.1 (15.6)	−15.2 (4.6)
Record low °C (°F)	−24.4 (−11.9)	−22.4 (−8.3)	−20.0 (−4.0)	−7.0 (19.4)	−1.3 (29.7)	4.2 (39.6)	7.8 (46.0)	6.2 (43.2)	−0.1 (31.8)	−8.5 (16.7)	−11.6 (11.1)	−22.2 (−8.0)	−24.4 (−11.9)
Average precipitation mm (inches)	39.8 (1.57)	33.5 (1.32)	29.7 (1.17)	29.5 (1.16)	54.7 (2.15)	70.8 (2.79)	78.0 (3.07)	83.7 (3.30)	50.6 (1.99)	55.6 (2.19)	52.0 (2.05)	44.8 (1.76)	622.7 (24.52)
Source 1: SMHI Open Data - Precipitation for Mariestad
Source 2: SMHI Open Data - Temperature for Mariestad
