= Gustav Engelbert Holm =

Swedish politician

Gustav Engelbert Holm (1883–1957) was a Swedish farm worker and member of parliament.

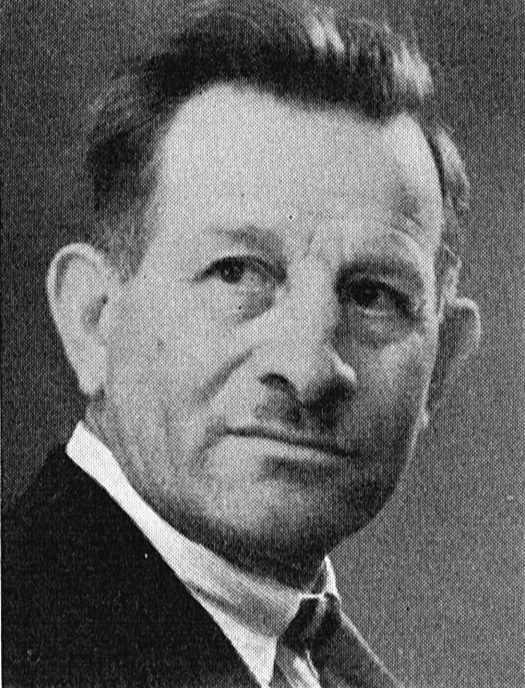
Gustav Holm's portrait
