= Gustav Holm (footballer) =

Norwegian footballer (1892-1971)

Personal information
- Date of birth: 9 March 1892
- Date of death: 27 April 1971 (aged 79)

International career
Years	Team	Apps	(Gls)
1912–1913	Norway	2	(0)

Gustav Holm (9 March 1892 – 27 April 1971) was a Norwegian footballer. He played in two matches for the Norway national football team in 1912 to 1913.
