= Gustaf Birger Anders Holm =

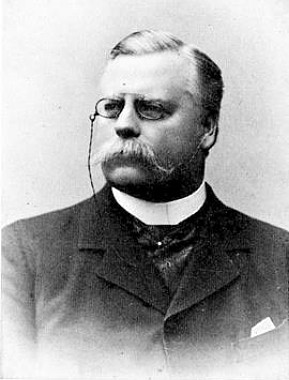
Gustaf Holm

Gustaf Birger Anders Holm (1845–1910) was a Swedish lawyer and publisher. He worked for the publishing house P.A. Norstedt & Söner, where he became managing director in 1879 and chairman of the board in 1898.

== Biography ==
From 1874 until his death he was responsible for the publication of the periodical Nytt juridiskt arkiv, the official publication collecting information about all rulings from the Supreme Court of Sweden.

In 1877, following a disagreement with Albert Bonnier, Holm and a number of other people left Svenska bokförläggareföreningen, the trade association for publishers, and formed their own trade association, with Holm as chairman. In 1912, after Holm's death, the two associations merged again.

In the early 1900s, Holm initiated the formation of a consortium to sponsor the building of a new national stage in Stockholm, to replace the old Royal Dramatic Theatre. Holm became vice chairman of the new foundation that led the Royal Dramatic Theatre when it had formally severed its ties with the government and the royal court.

In 1907, Holm bought the 17th-century manor house Steninge Palace.
