= Gustavus G. Prescott House =

Historic house in Massachusetts, United States

- U.S. National Register of Historic Places
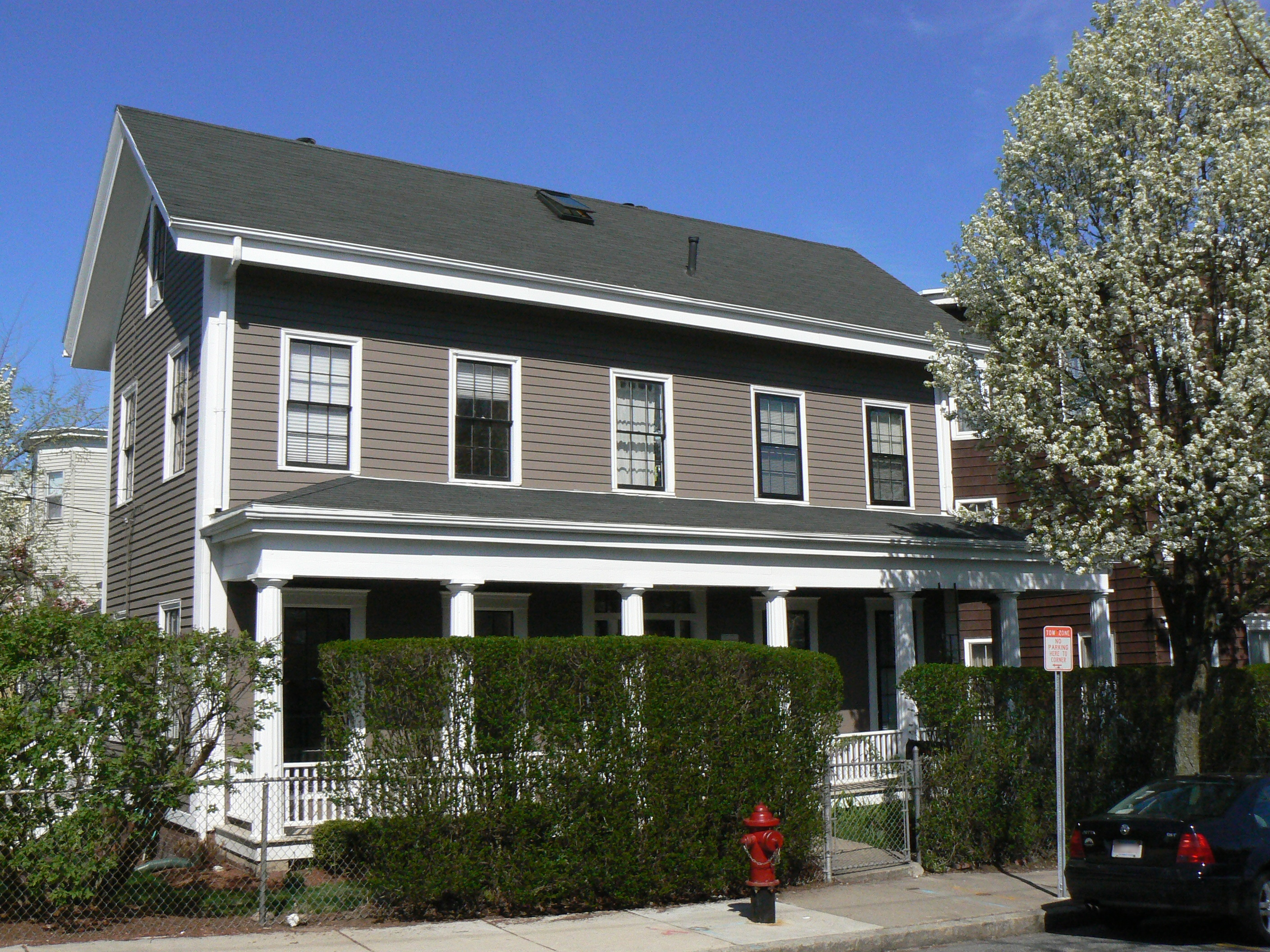

- Location within Massachusetts Location within the United States
- Location: 65–67 Perkins Street, Somerville, Massachusetts
- Coordinates: 42°23′3″N 71°4′45″W
- Architectural style: Greek Revival
- MPS: Somerville MPS
- NRHP reference No.: 89001278
- Added to NRHP: September 18, 1989

The Gustavus G. Prescott House is a historic house in Somerville, Massachusetts. It is a rare five-bay center-entry Greek Revival house to survive in East Somerville. The 2 1/2-story wood-frame house was built in the 1840s, along with a matching building at 69–71, which has lost historical integrity. The owner, Gustavus Prescott, was a Charlestown merchant who is said to have operated an inn on the premises.

The house was listed on the National Register of Historic Places in 1989.

== See also ==
- National Register of Historic Places listings in Somerville, Massachusetts
