= Kustaa =

Kustaa is a Finnish masculine name derived from Gustav. Notable people named Kustaa include:

- Arvo Kustaa Halberg (1910–2000), leader of the Communist Party USA
- Kaarlo Kustaa Lappalainen (1877–1965), Finnish sport shooter
- Kalle Kustaa Paasia (1883–1961), Finnish gymnast who competed in the 1908 Summer Olympics
- Kustaa Pihlajamäki (1902–1944), Finnish freestyle wrestler and Olympic champion
- Kustaa Rovio (1887–1938), Finnish Communist politician who fled to the Russian SFSR after the Finnish Civil War
