= Gustáv Murín =

Slovak dramatic, scriptwriter and writer

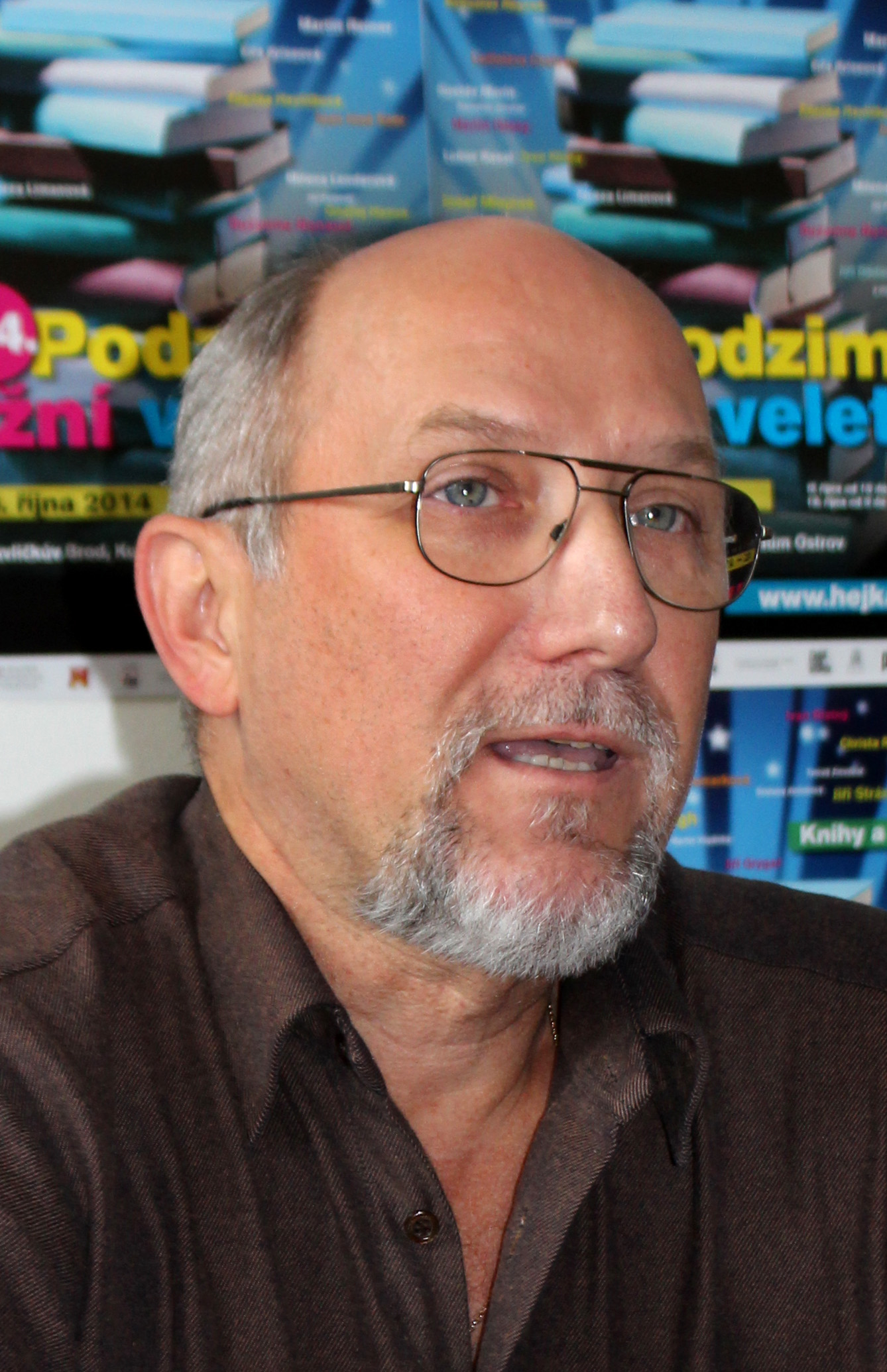
- Born: 9 April 1959 (age 67); Bratislava, Czechoslovakia
- Education: Comenius University
- Occupation: Writer

Gustáv Murín (born 9 April 1959) is a Slovak author and journalist. He has written critically on corruption in Slovak politics. His Small World was published in France as Le monde est petit. He was president of the PEN centre of Slovakia 2000 – 2004, 2009 – 2011.

== Biography ==
Gustáv Murín was born on 9 April 1959 in the Rača borough of Bratislava. His father was a university professor. Murín studied biology at the Comenius University, graduating in 1984

Murín became active as a writer in the 1980s, contributing to literary magazines including Slovenské pohľady and Romboid. In the 1990s, while working as an assistant professor of biology at the Comenius University, Murín established an almanac of regional literature Central Europe – Now. In 1994 he was briefly an editor of the Slovak edition of the Playboy magazine. He also organized meetings of young writers in Budmerice.

Since the early 2000s years, Murín has published a large number of books, typically compilations of newspaper articles dealing with the history of mafia in Slovakia. While his books generally sold well, Murín has been accused by journalists in Slovakia of spreading conspiracy theories and pro-Russian fake news online and through his books. Murín was also as a blogger, spreading conspiracy narratives, including that the Boston Marathon bombing was a hoax.

In 2018, he shortly hosted a show about science on Radio and Television of Slovakia, but was soon replaced after public backlash. Later that year, the Comenius University fired Murín from his faculty position after the writer harassed and threatened a journalism student.

In January 2025, Murín was appointed acting director of the Slovak Literary Centre by the culture minister Martina Šimkovičová. His appointment was met with resistance from the staff of the centre, who accused Murín of authoritarian management style as well as promoting ideas "at odds with democratic values". In May 2025, Murín participated at the World of Books exhibition of books in Prague, where he caused controversy by defending the Russian invasion of Ukraine, arguing that feminism was a form of totalitarianism akin to communism and Nazism and referring to former Czechoslovak president Václav Havel as a "pawn of superpowers". Following the subsequent outcry from Czech and Slovak cultural circles, minister Šimkovičová removed Murín from office.

== Novels ==
- 1989 Případ pohřbeného hřbitova
- 1990 Leto praje milencom
- 1990 Návraty zo svetla
- 1998 Ako sa máš
- 1998 Zvieratá, ja a iné
- 2005 Svet je malý / Le monde est petit
- 2010 Návrat do budúcnosti
- 2015 Volajú ma Žaluď – …a ešte ma nedostali
