= Gustavus Smith =

Gustavus Smith may refer to:

- Gustavus Woodson Smith (1821–1896), United States Army officer and civil engineer
- Gustavus T. Smith (1800–1875), English cricketer
- Gustavus Adolphus Smith (1820–1885), carriage maker in Decatur, Illinois
