= Gustavus Schmidt =

American lawyer

Gustavus Schmidt (16 June 1795 – 20 September 1877) was an American lawyer and lecturer on Civil Law at the University of Louisiana. He was the author of a number of law books and also founded the predecessor of the School of Law at Tulane University.

== Biography ==
Gustavus Schmidt was born in Mariestad in Västra Götaland County, Sweden. He was educated at the classical school in Jönköpings, where his father, Hans Kristian Schmidt, was a judge of the Aulic Council for the south of Sweden. In 1810 he entered the Swedish Royal Navy. In 1815 he settled on the eastern shore of Maryland, where he was engaged as a private tutor. Five years later he went to Richmond, Virginia where he studied law and after being admitted to the Virginia State Bar, practiced the legal profession for a number of years.

Among the important cases with which he was connected was that of Jose Murando, Jose Hilario Casares, and Felix Barbieto, three Spaniards charged with piracy and murder on board the brig Crawford. He was assigned as counsel for the defendants by Chief Justice John Marshall, to whom he had been introduced by his elder brother, Karl Kristian Schmidt (1792-1872). His brother was a prominent Swedish Jurist and was also the editor-in-chief of the leading law journal of Sweden. The two brothers corresponded frequently throughout their lives. The case of the brig Crawford created an unusual sensation, owing to the horrible nature of the crime. Subsequently, Schmidt published A Brief Sketch of the Occurrences on board the Brig Crawford (Richmond, 1827).

In 1829, Schmidt moved to New Orleans, Louisiana, where he met and married Melanie Seghers, (1804-1836). She was the daughter of Dominique Seghers (1767-1848), a prominent attorney who had immigrated with his family from Brussels in 1807. Schmidt established himself in the legal profession and in New Orleans society. He was associated with Henry Clay as co-counsel for the heirs of Claude Joseph Villars Dubreuil (1689-1757) in their suit for the recovery of the land on which the United States Mint stood. His knowledge of the Spanish language led to his selection by the merchants of New Orleans to look after their interests in Mexico. Subsequently, he was sent to Havana, Cuba to supervise the details of certain contracts between investment banker James Robb (1814-1881) and the Spanish authorities in Cuba. James Robb had established the first gas-works for lighting the city of Havana.

== Works ==
In 1844, Schmidt founded the Louisiana Law School in New Orleans which was one of the predecessors of the Tulane University School of Law. In 1842, Schmidt had begun a series of lectures on civil law, which he continued for three winters. These lectures have been pointed to as a precursor of the Tulane University Law School. He also founded and edited the short-lived Louisiana Law Journal from 1841 to 1843. He published weekly reviews of the decisions of the Louisiana Supreme Court in The Daily True Delta for years, and made contributions to periodicals. He wrote The Civil Law of Spain and Mexico, with Notes and References (New Orleans, 1851). At his death, he left a library with over 1,000 titles, many with multiple volumes.

== Other sources ==
- Hoeflich, M. H.; Vergne, Louis de la. "Gustavus Schmidt: His life and his library" (PDF). romanlegaltradition.org.
