= Kustas =

Male given name

- Gender: Male
- Language: Estonian
- Name day: 28 August

Origin
- Region of origin: Estonia

Other names
- Related names: Gustav, Kustav, Kusti, Kusto

Kustas is an Estonian masculine given name; a cognate of the Nordic given name Gustav, which is also found in Estonia. Other variants and diminutives of Kustas found in Estonia include Kustav, Kusti, and Kusto.

As of 1 January 2021, Kustas was the 1,095th most popular male name in Estonia.

Individuals bearing the name Kustas include:

- Kustas Kikerpuu (1937–2008), composer, jazz musician and conductor
- Kustas Köidam (1879–1963), politician
- Kustas Kotsar (1872–1942), writer and journalist
- Kustas Põldmaa (1897–1977), writer and conservationist
- Kustas Tonkmann (1882–1942), politician
- Kustas Utuste (1884–1941), military major
