= Gustav Ahnelöv =

Swedish ice hockey player

- Born: 22 April 1996 (age 28); Stockholm, Sweden
- Height: 5 ft 11 in (180 cm)
- Weight: 183 lb (83 kg; 13 st 1 lb)
- Position: Defense
- Shoots: Right
- Hockeyettan team Former teams: Huddinge IK: Karlskrona HK; Coventry Blaze
- Playing career: 2015–present

Gustav Ahnelöv (born 22 April 1996) is a Swedish ice hockey player currently playing with Huddinge IK of the Hockeyettan. He previously played with Karlskrona HK of the Swedish Hockey League and the Coventry Blaze of the United Kingdom's Elite Ice Hockey League.

Ahnelöv made his Swedish Hockey League debut playing with Karlskrona HK during the 2015-16 SHL season.
