= Gustaf Wilson =

Finnish-American pioneer and businessman (1827–1905)

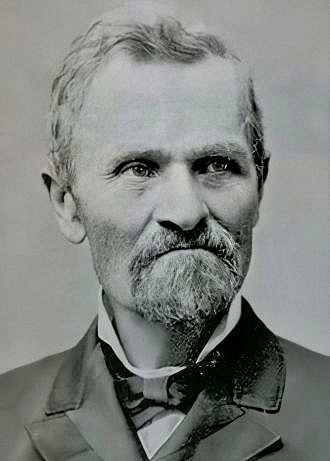
- Born: Kustaa Hemmilä; 2 June 1827; Oulu, Grand Duchy of Finland
- Died: 21 September 1905 (aged 78); Portland, Oregon, United States
- Occupation: Vice Consul
- Spouse: Christina Wideen (m. 1871)
- Children: 1

Gustaf Wilson (formerly Kustaa Hemmilä, Finnish pronunciation: [ˈkustɑː ˈhemːilæ]; 2 June 1827 – 21 September 1905) was a Finnish American pioneer during the Wild West era. Wilson was an early Finn who immigrated to America, and rose to a prominent social position in his new homeland.

== Biography ==
Wilson, originally Hemmilä, was born in Oulu, Finland. His father Johan Hemmilä (1790–1859) was from Lumijoki and his mother Anna Määttä (1784–1835) from Kiiminki. His father was a sailor by profession, and Wilson also went to sea in 1842, but was shipwrecked on the French coast and returned to Finland. In October 1846, he went to sea again and arrived in New Orleans in 1849. In March 1850, attracted by the California gold rush, he sailed with his companion via Cape Horn to San Francisco, where they arrived on October 10, 1850. Wilson, who had at time changed his name, left California in 1852, disappointed in the gold rush, and settled in Jackson County in the southern part of what is now Oregon. He volunteered for the army because as a soldier he would receive regular meals and a monetary compensation for regular service. Wilson served in the Rogue River during the American Indian Wars of 1853 and again in 1855–56, in which more than twenty Indian tribes were forcibly removed from the Rogue Valley. The United States Congress awarded Wilson the Medal of Honor. In 1855, he was elected county coroner of Jackson County, a position he held for six years. In 1862, he was elected county clerk of Josephine County, a position he held for four years.

Wilson joined the Freemasons in 1858 and remained an active member throughout his life. His involvement in Masonic activities brought him to Portland several times, where he finally moved in 1866. He then worked as a salesman in several Portland stores and for a short time as a mill manager in Monmouth, Oregon. Wilson and Christina Wideen married in 1871 and adopted a daughter. In 1883, Wilson was appointed vice-consul of Russia to promote Russian economic interests in Oregon. Wilson served as treasurer of the first Finnish-American Missionary Society, founded in Astoria, Oregon, in 1888, and helped build a Finnish Lutheran church in the town. He was also a member of the Oregon Pioneer Association and the Oregon Historical Association. Wilson visited his former homeland of Finland only once, in 1890, when he was received as a distinguished guest in Oulu.

== See also ==
- Finnish Americans
- List of Freemasons
- Rogue River Wars
