= Gösta Lilliehöök =

Gösta Lilliehöök may refer to:

- Gösta Lilliehöök (1871–1952), Swedish Army officer
- Gösta Lilliehöök (1884–1974), Swedish Army officer and modern pentathlete

== See also ==
- Lilliehöök
