= Gösta =

Swedish masculine given name

Gösta is a male given name, a variant of Gustav. Notable people with the name include:

== People ==
- Gösta Alexandersson (1905–1988), Swedish actor
- Gösta Åsbrink (1881–1966), Swedish gymnast and modern pentathlete
- Gösta Andersson (skier) (1918–1979), Swedish cross-country skier
- Gösta Andersson (wrestler) (1917–1975), Swedish wrestler
- Gösta Bagge (1882–1951), Swedish professor of economics and conservative politician
- Gösta Bengtsson (1897–1984), Swedish sailor
- Gösta Bernhard (1910–1986), Swedish actor, film director and screenwriter
- Gösta Bladin (1894–1972), Swedish track and field athlete
- Gösta Bohman (1911–1997), Swedish politician and the leader of the Swedish liberal conservative Moderate Party
- Gösta Brodin (1908–1979), Swedish sailor
- Gösta Carlsson (1906–1992), Swedish road racing cyclist
- Gösta Cederlund (1888–1980), Swedish actor and film director
- Gösta Danielsson (1912–1978), Swedish chess master
- Gösta Ehrensvärd (1885–1973), Swedish vice admiral
- Gösta Ekman d.y. (junior), (1939–2017), Swedish actor
- Gösta Ekman (senior), Sr. (1890–1938), Swedish actor
- Gösta Engzell (1897–1997), Swedish jurist and diplomat
- Gösta Eriksson (1931–2024), Swedish rower
- Gösta Eriksson (rowing) (1900–1970), Swedish rower
- Gösta Frändfors (1915–1973), Swedish wrestler
- Gösta Gärdin (1923–2015), Swedish Army officer and modern pentathlete, Olympic medalist
- Gösta Grip (1904–1998), Swedish actor
- Gösta Gustafson (1886–1963), Swedish actor
- Gösta Hallberg (1891–1978), Swedish athlete
- Gösta Hökmark (1920–1993), Swedish major general
- Gösta Holmér (1891–1983), Swedish decathlete
- Gösta Johansson (1929–1997), Swedish ice hockey player
- Gösta Karlsson, Swedish footballer
- Gösta Knutsson (1908–1973), Swedish radio producer and children's writer
- Gösta Krantz (1925–2008), Swedish actor and revue artist
- Gösta Larsson (1931–2006), the first recipient ever of a dental implant
- Gösta Hjalmar Liljequist (1914–1995), Swedish meteorologist
- Gösta Lilliehöök (disambiguation), several people
- Gösta Löfgren (1923–2006), Swedish footballer
- Gösta Löfgren (footballer, born 1891) (1891–1932), Finnish footballer
- Gösta Lundqvist (1892–1944), Swedish sailor
- Gösta Lundqvist (geologist) (1894–1967), Swedish geologist
- Gösta Mittag-Leffler (1846–1927), Swedish mathematician
- Gösta Netzén (1908–1984), Swedish journalist and politician
- Gösta "Snoddas" Nordgren (1926–1981), Swedish entertainer (singer, actor)
- Gösta Nystroem (1890–1966), Swedish composer
- Gösta Odqvist (1913–2005), Swedish Air Force lieutenant general
- Gösta Olson (1883–1966), Swedish gymnast
- Gösta Persson (1904–1991), Swedish freestyle swimmer and water polo player
- Gösta af Petersens (1910–1969), Swedish diplomat
- Gösta Pettersson (born 1940), Swedish former professional road racing cyclist
- Gösta Prüzelius (1922–2000), Swedish actor
- Gösta Raquette (1896–1922), Swedish modern pentathlete
- Gösta Salén (1922–2002), Swedish sailor
- Gösta Sandahl, Swedish figure skater
- Gösta Sandberg, (1932–2006), Swedish footballer and icehockey player
- Gösta Sjöberg (1896–1968), Swedish diver
- Gösta Skoglund (1903–1988), Swedish politician
- Gösta Stoltz (1904–1963), Swedish chess grandmaster
- Gösta Sundqvist (1957–2003), famous Finnish musician and radio personality
- Gösta Törner (gymnast) (1895–1971), Swedish gymnast
- Gösta Werner (1908–2009), Swedish film director
- Gösta Winbergh (1943–2002), Swedish tenor
- Gösta, nickname of Jostein Hakestad (born 1981), Norwegian podcaster and stand-up comedian
- Lars-Gösta Elofsson (born 1953), birth name of Swedish politician Blåvitt Elofsson

== Fictional characters ==
- the title character of Gösta Berling's Saga, Selma Lagerlöf's 1891 first novel, and The Saga of Gösta Berling, a 1924 film adaptation
