= Karl Gustav Homeyer =

German jurist (1795–1874)

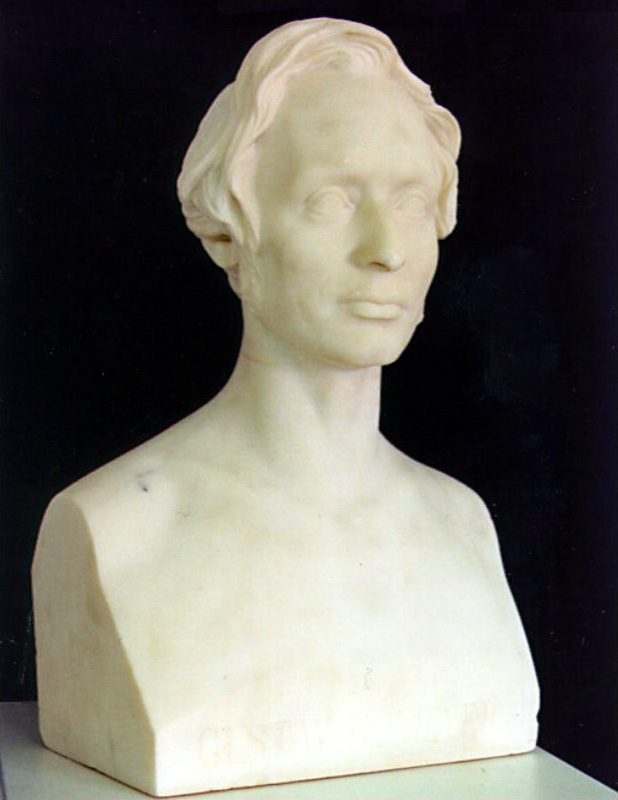
- Bust by Johann Friedrich Drake

Karl Gustav Homeyer (13 August 1795 – 20 October 1874) was a German jurist who worked at the University of Berlin. his principal works include Sachsenspiegal and Dies Haus - und Hofmarken.

== Biography ==
He was born at Wolgast, a small town in Pomerania, which at that time belonged to Sweden. His father, a merchant, took him to Sweden in 1806. After four years, he joined the household of his uncle Friedrich Rühs, a noted historian who had just accepted a professorship at the newly founded University of Berlin. From 1813 to 1817, he studied law at the universities of Berlin, Göttingen and Heidelberg. At Berlin, he was introduced to the principles of the so-called historical school of the science of law by Savigny and Eichhorn, who were his principal teachers. In 1821, he settled as a Privatdozent at the university of Berlin, where he became ordinary professor of law in 1827.

== Work ==
His principal works are his edition of the Sachsenspiegel (in 3 vols., 1827, 3rd ed., 1861, containing also some other important sources of Saxon or Low German law), which is still unsurpassed in accuracy and sagacity of research, and his book on Die Haus- und Hofmarken (1870), in which he has given a history of the use of trademarks among all the Teutonic nations of Europe, and which is full of important elucidations of the history of law and also contains valuable contributions to the history of art and civilization.

In 1850 Homeyer was elected a member of the Berlin Academy of Sciences, in the Transactions of which he published various papers exhibiting profound learning:

- "Über die Heimat," 1852
- "Genealogie der Handschriften des Sachsenspiegels," 1859
- "Die Stadtbücher des Mittelalters," 1860
- "Der Dreissigste," 1864.
