= Carl Gustaf Wolff =

Finnish businessman

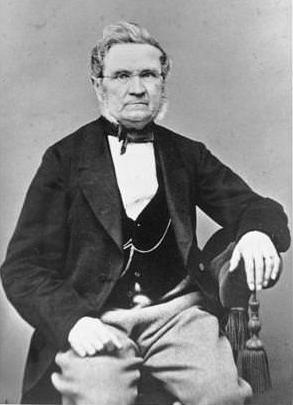
Carl Gustaf Wolff

Carl Gustaf Wolff (28 October 1800 – 19 July 1868) was a Finnish shipowner and businessman during his time. He was born in either Noormarkku (Sw. Norrmark) or Suomenlinna (Sw. Sveaborg) in Finland, when it still was a part of Sweden. His father Dietrich Wolff lead the military orchestra in Suomenlinna and later he became the conductor for the regiment in Pori. Sometime in between these jobs Carl Gustaf was born.

Carl Gustafs father died when Carl was twelve years old and after that he made a living as a sales clerk in Pori. When he was 18 - or 20 according to some sources - he turned up in Vaasa without a dime. Already in 1825 he had opened his first store and was also the first that could be called a book salesman in Vaasa. He also started the city's first printing press and published the city's first paper (Wasa Tidning) in 1839.

But what he is most known for is his career as a shipowner. In 1828 he became a partial shipowner, in 1830 he took part in building the brig Wänskapen in Petsmo and four years later he was the owner of a shipyard in the Strait of Palosaari in Vaasa. There he built 48 ships, of which 42 were his. In his prime he was the biggest shipowner in Finland and the Nordic countries. In 1867 the private person Carl Gustaf Wolff had more tonnage than the cities Kokkola, Jakobstad, Nykarleby, Kristinestad, Rauma and Pori put together.

Carl Gustaf Wolff also represented Vaasa in the burghers estate in the Diet of Finland in 1862-63 and 1867.

He died in Stockholm, in 1868.
