= Gustavus Poznanski =

- Born: 1804; Storchnest, South Prussia
- Died: 1879 (aged 74–75)
- Occupation: Rabbi
- Spouse: Esther G. (Hetty) Barrett
- Children: Isaac Barrett, Joseph, Gustavus Jr., Sarah

Gustavus Poznanski (1804–1879) was cantor and religious leader in Congregation Beth Elohim, Charleston, a pioneer of Reform Judaism in the Antebellum South.

== Biography ==
=== Early life ===
Poznanski was born in 1804 in Storchnest, South Prussia, now a part of Poland. He was one of seven children born to Joseph and Sarah Poznanski, members of the Hebrew Congregation of Storchnest. Being from an Orthodox Jewish family, he received a traditional education as a ritual slaughterer and a cantor. He left Poland in 1824 to go to Hamburg, which was a major center of the Jewish Reform Movement at the time. He spent time in Hamburg and later in Bremen learning about Reform Judaism before emigrating to the United States in 1831. A contemporary of Poznanski wrote that he "came from Bremen and Hamburg a scholar and endowed with extraordinary musical talent."

=== Career ===
After arriving in the United States, he began serving as a shochet and the assistant hazzan at the Congregation Shearith Israel in New York City in 1832.

In 1836, he was approached by members of Congregation Kahal Kadosh Beth Elohim in Charleston, South Carolina, when a vacancy in the position of hazzan, or minister, had opened up. The congregation was firmly traditionalist but was wary of those in favor of reform – a group of reformers called "The Reformed Society of Israelites," had split off from Congregation Beth Elohim in 1824 but had disbanded in 1833. Thus, the congregation was looking for a minister "who would faithfully execute his duties, according to those Rabbinical and Mosaical laws which were deemed vital to the existence of the Congregation, and who would also oppose innovation and change." Isaac Leeser, one of the most prominent Orthodox Jewish leaders in America at the time, among others, recommended Poznanski for this role. Upon meeting with him, the leaders of the Congregation were satisfied and immediately elected him minister. Poznanski came to Charleston and so impressed the congregation and its traditional leaders through his gracious attitude and his skill in clerical duties that after just one year, he was elected minister for life even before his initial two-year contract was over.

In April 1838, the synagogue of Beth Elohim burned down in a fire. The construction of a new synagogue, built in the Greek Revival style, was completed in 1840. Around this time, perhaps influenced by his time spent in Germany, Poznanski began to show signs of support for reform. He was in favor of adding instrumental music to service and suggested building a new organ in the new synagogue building. Some progressive members of the congregation, backed by Poznanski, submitted a petition for the creation of an organ to the Board of Trustees. The idea was rejected by the traditionalist leaders as conflicting with the congregation's constitution, but a close, hotly contested congregational vote decided in favor of the petition and the organ was built. As a result, many of the traditionalist members of the congregation left Beth Elohim and created a new congregation, Shearith Israel, whose synagogue was located only a few blocks away from Beth Elohim's. Poznanski became the rabbi of the newly constructed Beth Elohim synagogue and the reformers gained control over the congregation and the Board of Trustees of Beth Elohim. At the dedication of the new synagogue building in 1841, Poznanski famously said, "This synagogue is our temple, this city our Jerusalem, this happy land our Palestine, and as our fathers defended with their lives that temple, that city and that land, so will their sons defend this temple, this city and this land." He added, "America is our Zion and Washington our Jerusalem."

After gaining control, Poznanski and the Reformers began to suggest more reforms such as the removal of the twelfth principle regarding the belief in the coming of the Messiah from Maimonides' Thirteen Principles of Faith as well as the removal of some traditional prayers and hymns from service. In response, some of the more traditionalist members, as well as some moderates who had supported the initiative for the organ but feared further reform, began to oppose the efforts of Poznanski and the reformers. The conflict between the Traditionalist and Reform groups came to a head when the Traditionalist group filed a lawsuit against the Reform group shortly after Poznanski had given a sermon suggesting ending the observance of the second days of Passover, on the first day of Passover in 1843. The South Carolina Court of Appeals ruled in favor of the Reform position in 1846, allowing Poznanski to continue his reforms. Further reforms implemented by Poznanski as minister included carrying out services in English rather than Hebrew, implementing a three-year reading cycle of the Torah, the removal of the reading of the Haftarah, and the recital of only one kaddish during funerals. Upon being asked when would these changes would end, Poznanski replied "that he knew no stopping place to Reform in this enlightened age."

Despite his victory in court, Pozanski faced heavy criticism from Traditionalists in Charleston as well as in other places in the United States and there remained much bitterness between the two groups. He offered to resign as minister in 1847, with the hope that a new minister could ease tensions and unify the community. The Board of Trustees opposed his decision to resign immediately, but allowed him to lead a search committee to look for a successor. In 1850, a successor was found and Poznanski officially resigned. However, none of the successors of Poznanski were very successful in achieving unity in the Beth Elohim congregation until the reunification of Shearith Israel with Beth Elohim in 1866.

=== Personal life ===
He married Esther G. (Hetty) Barrett, the daughter of Isaac Barrett, the former president of the Hebrew Benevolent Society and Rachel Barrett. They had four children:

- Isaac Barrett Poznanski (1840–1896). He became a prominent violinist and composer.
- Joseph Poznanski (1841–1916).
- Gustavus Poznanski, Jr. (1842–1862). He served as a private in the Confederate States Army (CSA) during the American Civil War. He was killed in action in the Battle of Secessionville.
- Sarah Poznanski (1844–1874).

=== Later life and death ===
After resigning as minister from Beth Elohim, Poznanski eventually moved back to New York, although he still maintained membership in Beth Elohim until 1876 and visited Charleston often. He also signed the agreement that resulted in the reunification of the Beth Elohim and Shearith Israel congregations in Charleston in 1866. He died in New York in 1879 a few days after being hit by a horse-drawn trolley.
