= August (name) =

Male given name and family name

August is both a given name and surname developed from the Latin, Augustus. Derived from the Latin word augere, meaning "to increase", Augustus had the meaning "esteemed" or "venerable" and was a title given to Roman emperors.

== Persons with the given name August ==
- August Aichhorn (1878–1949), Austrian educator and psychoanalyst
- August Alle (1890–1952), Estonian writer
- August Allebé (1838–1927), Dutch painter
- August Alsina (born 1992), American singer
- August Ames (1994–2017), American adult film actress
- August Annist (1899–1972), Estonian literary and folklore scholar, writer and translator
- August Bebel (1840–1913), German social-democrat
- August Björklund (born 2002), Finnish footballer
- August Blom (1869–1947), Danish film director
- August Bogusch (1890–1948), German SS officer at Auschwitz executed for war crimes
- August Bournonville (1805–1879), Danish ballet master and choreographer
- August Brooksbank (born 2021), son of Princess Eugenie of York and Jack Brooksbank
- August Coppola (1934–2009), American academic
- August Diehl (born 1976), German actor
- August Dvorak (1894–1975), American educational psychologist and professor
- August Eigruber (1907–1947), Austrian-born Nazi hanged for war crimes
- August Getty (born 1994), American fashion designer
- August Gustafsson Lohaprasert (born 1993), Thai footballer
- August von Haxthausen (1792–1866), German agricultural scientist
- August Horch (1868−1951), German engineer and automobile pioneer, the founder of the manufacturing giant which would eventually become Audi
- August Jakobson (1904–1963), Estonian writer and politician
- August Jerndorff (1846–1906), Danish painter
- August Kastra (1878–1941), Estonian journalist and a trade union leader
- August Kippasto (1887–1973), Estonian wrestler
- August Kirsimägi (1905–1933), Estonian writer
- August Kitzberg (1855–1927), Estonian writer
- August Kleinzahler (born 1949), American poet
- August Theodor Koerner (1843–1912), American businessman and politician
- August Kohver (1889–1942), Estonian agronomist and politician
- August Krogh (1874–1949), Danish professor
- August Kubizek (1888–1956), Austrian composer, early friend of Adolf Hitler
- August Kukk (1908–1988), Estonian wrestler
- August Lass (1903–1962), Estonian footballer
- August Leskien (1840–1916), German linguist
- August Liivik (1903–1942), Estonian sport shooter
- August Mälk (1900–1987), Estonian writer and politician
- August Mangeney, American politician
- August Maramaa (1881–1941), Estonian politician
- August Maturo (born 2007), American actor
- August Meyszner (1886–1947), Austrian Nazi SS officer executed for war crimes
- August Mikkelsen (born 2000), Norwegian footballer
- August Neo (1908–1982), Estonian wrestler
- August Oberhauser (1895–1971), Swiss footballer
- August Pikker (1889–1976), Estonian wrestler
- August Ponthier (born 1996), American singer-songwriter
- August Rei (1886–1963), Estonian politician
- August S. Narumi (1919–1994), American-Japanese Bronze Wolf recipient
- August Saabye (1823–1916), Danish sculptor
- August Sang (1914–1969), Estonian poet and literary translator
- August Sangret (1913–1943), Canadian soldier executed for murder
- August Schellenberg (1936–2013), Canadian First Nation actor
- August Schmidhuber (1901–1947), German Nazi SS officer executed for war crimes
- August Spies (1855–1887), American anarchist
- August Strindberg (1849–1912), Swedish writer, playwright and painter
- August Traksmaa (1893–1942), Estonian Army General and diplomat
- August Vaga (1893–1960), Estonian botanist
- August Volberg (1896–1982), Estonian architect and educator
- August von Mackensen (1849–1945), German field marshal
- August W. Farwick (1902–1977), American football player and coach
- August Warberg (1842–1915), Swedish actor
- August Weismann (1834–1914), German evolutionary biologist
- August Wesley (1887–1942), Finnish journalist, trade unionist and revolutionary
- August Willich (1810 - 1878), Prussian-American general and communist revolutionary
- August Wilson (1945–2005), American playwright
- August Winding (1835–1899), Danish pianist and composer
- August Wolfinger (born 1949), Liechtenstein alpine skier
- August, Duke of Saxe-Merseburg-Zörbig (1655–1715), German prince
- August, Duke of Schleswig-Holstein-Sonderburg-Beck (1652–1689), German noble
- August, Prince of Hohenlohe-Öhringen (1784–1853), German noble and general of the Napoleonic Wars

== Persons with the surname August ==
- Alba August (born 1993), Danish-born Swedish actress and singer
- AJ August (born 2005), American cyclist
- Bille August (born 1948), Danish film director
- Bonnie August (1947–2003), American fashion designer
- Carl August (disambiguation), the name of several people
- Edward August (1860–1935), member of the Legislative Assembly of Manitoba from 1915 to 1922
- Ernest August (disambiguation), the name of several people
- Hal August (1890–1918), American silent film actor
- Joe August (1931–1992), American blues and R&B singer and songwriter
- John August (born 1970), American screenwriter
- Joseph August (1890–1947), American cinematographer
- Leo August (1914–1997), American philatelist, stamp dealer and publisher
- Lynn August (1948–2025), American zydeco accordionist, keyboard player, singer and bandleader
- Pernilla August (born 1958), Swedish actress, married to Bille August
- Tyler August (born 1983), American politician

== Fictional characters ==
- August Horn of Årnäs, character from Young Royals
- August Pullman, main character in R.J. Palacio's Wonder and Wonder (film)
- August Walker, character from Mission: Impossible – Fallout, played by actor Henry Cavill
- August Wayne Booth, a recurring character in ABC TV show Once Upon A Time
- August Zabladowski, a character from the 1953 musical fantasy film The 5,000 Fingers of Dr. T.
- August, character from Tales from the Borderlands
- August, the mascot of the 1997 World Games.
- Dan August, detective played by actor Burt Reynolds

== Masculine variants ==
- Ágastas (Irish)
- Ágost (Hungarian)
- Agostino (Italian)
- Ágúst (Icelandic)
- Águstas (Irish)
- Agusto (Spanish)
- Ağustos (Turkish)
- Aogust (Breton)
- August (Catalan, Danish, English, Estonian, German, Norwegian, Polish, Swedish)
- August (Indonesian)
- Augustas (Lithuanian)
- Auguste (French)
- Augusti (Albanian)
- Augusto (Italian, Portuguese, Spanish)
- Augusts (Latvian)
- Augustu (Sicilian)
- Augustus (Dutch, Latin)
- Aukusti (Finnish)
- Austu (Sardinian)
- Ávgos (Sami)
- Avgust (Slovenian)
- Awgust (Sorbian)
- Oğuz (Turkish)
- Αύγουστος (Avgoustos) (Greek)
- Августин (Avgustin, Avhust) (Bulgarian, Macedonian, Russian, Serbian, Ukrainian)
- אוגוסטוס (Hebrew)

=== Diminutive and pet forms ===
- Agge (Swedish)
- Ago (Estonian)
- Aku (Finnish)
- Augi (German)
- Augie (English)
- Auke (Frisian)
- Ësti (Luxembourgish)
- Gus (English, Scottish)
- Gusse (Danish)
- Gust (Luxembourgish)
- Gusta (Czech)
- Gustek (Slovenian)
- Gustelj (Slovenian)
- Gusti (Luxembourgish, German, Slovenian)
- Gustík (Czech)
- Gustl (German, Slovenian)
- Guto (Portuguese)
- Guus (Dutch)
- Kusti (Finnish)

== Feminine variants ==
- Ágústa (Icelandic)
- Agustina (Indonesian)
- August (English)
- Augusta (Danish, Dutch, English, Italian, Polish, Portuguese, Hungarian)
- Auguste (English, German, French)
- Augustė (Lithuanian)
- Augustia (English)
- Auguszta (Hungarian)
- Avgusta (Slovenian)

=== Diminutive and pet forms ===
- Auggie
- Aukje (Frisian)
- Gus
- Gussie (English)
- Gussy (German)
- Gusta (Dutch)
- Guusje (Dutch)

== See also ==
- Agus
- August (month)
- Augustine
- Augustus
- Gustav
