= Ágúst =

Ágúst (Icelandic pronunciation: [ˈauː(ɣ)ust]) or Agust is a given name. Notable people with the name include:

- Ágúst Ólafur Ágústsson (born 1977), Icelandic politician
- Ágúst Ásgeirsson (born 1952), Icelandic middle-distance runner
- Ágúst H. Bjarnason (1875–1952), Icelandic philosopher
- Ágúst Björgvinsson (born 1979), Icelandic professional basketball coach
- Ágúst Elí Björgvinsson (born 1995), Icelandic handball player
- Ágúst Guðmundsson (born 1947), Icelandic film director and screenwriter
- Ágúst Herbert Guðmundsson (1967–2021), Icelandic basketball coach and player
- Ágúst Gylfason (born 1971), Icelandic footballer and manager
- Ágúst Hauksson (born 1960), Icelandic footballer
- Ágúst Hlynsson (born 2000), Icelandic footballer
- Ágúst Þór Jóhannsson (born 1977), Icelandic handball player, coach
- Ágúst Már Jónsson (born 1960), Icelandic footballer
- Ágúst Ögmundsson (born 1946), Icelandic handball player
- Ágúst Pálsson (1893–1967), Icelandic architect
- Ágúst Orri Þorsteinsson (born 2005), Icelandic footballer
- Daníel Ágúst Haraldsson (born 1969), Icelandic singer and music producer
- Karl Ágúst Úlfsson (born 1957), Icelandic film actor

== See also ==
- August, a month
- August (name)
