= Karl August =

Given name

Karl-August may refer to:

- Adolph Carl August von Eschenmayer (1768–1852), German philosopher and physician
- Christian Karl August Ludwig von Massenbach (1758–1827), Prussian soldier
- Eduard Karl August Riehm (1830–1888), German Protestant theologian
- Friedrich Karl August, Prince of Waldeck and Pyrmont (1743–1812), Prince of Waldeck and Pyrmont
- Hans Karl August Simon von Euler-Chelpin (1873–1964), German-born Swedish biochemist
- Johann Karl August Musäus (1735–1787), German author from Jena
- Karl August, 10th Prince of Thurn and Taxis (1898–1982), tenth Prince of Thurn and Taxis
- Karl August, Grand Duke of Saxe-Weimar-Eisenach (1757–1828), duke of Saxe-Weimar and of Saxe-Eisenach
- Karl August, Hereditary Grand Duke of Saxe-Weimar-Eisenach (1844–1894), Hereditary Grand Duke of Saxe-Weimar-Eisenach
- Karl August, Prince of Waldeck and Pyrmont (1704–1763), Prince of Waldeck and Pyrmont
- Karl August Alten (1764–1840), Hanoverian and British soldier
- Karl August Auberlen (1824–1864), German Lutheran theologian
- Karl August Bottiger (1760–1835), German archaeologist and classicist
- Karl August Devrient (1797–1872), German stage actor
- Karl August Ehrensvard (1745–1800), Swedish naval officer, painter, author, and neo-classical architect
- Karl August Einbund (1888–1942), Estonian journalist, politician and head of state
- Karl August Engelbrekt Ahlqvist (1826–1889), Finnish poet, scholar of the Finno-Ugric language, author, literary critic
- Karl August Ferdinand von Borcke (1776–1830), Prussian general, first recipient of the Iron Cross
- Karl August Folkers (1906–1997), American biochemist, working at Merck
- Karl August Friedrich Mahn (1802–1887), German philologist and language teacher and researcher
- Karl August Genzken (1885–1957), physician, conducted human experiments on prisoners of concentration camps
- Karl August Görner (1806–1884), German actor, director and playwright
- Karl August Hanke (1903–1945), official of the National Socialist German Workers Party (Nazi Party)
- Karl August Haraldsen (1889–1959), Norwegian merchant
- Karl August Hase (1800–1890), German Protestant theologian and Church historian
- Karl August Katzer (1822–1904), Sorbian composer and conductor
- Karl August Lossen (1841–1893), German petrologist and geologist
- Karl August Mobius (1825–1908), German zoologist
- Karl August Nerger (1875–1947), naval officer of the Imperial German Navy in World War I
- Karl August Nicander (1799–1839), Swedish lyric poet
- Karl August Offman (born 1940), Mauritian politician
- Karl August Otto Hoffmann (1853–1909), German botanist and a high school teacher in Berlin
- Karl August Ramsay (1791–1855), Finnish politician
- Karl August Reinhold Wunderlich (1815–1877), German physician, pioneer psychiatrist, medical professor
- Karl August Steinheil (1801–1870), German physicist, inventor, engineer and astronomer
- Karl August Varnhagen von Ense (1785–1858), German biographer, diplomat and soldier
- Karl August von Bergen (1704–1759), German anatomist and botanist
- Karl August von Hardenberg (1750–1822), Prussian statesman and Prime Minister of Prussia
- Karl August von Heigel (1835–1905), German novelist
- Karl August Wilhelm Frenzel (1911–1996), the commandant of Sobibor extermination camp's Lager I section
- Karl August Wittfogel (1896–1988), German-American playwright, historian, and sinologist
- Karl August Wuensche (1838–1912), German Christian Hebraist
- Karl-August Fagerholm (1901–1984), Speaker of Parliament and three times Prime Minister of Finland
- Karl-August Freiherr von Bülow (1904–1986), highly decorated Oberst in the Wehrmacht during World War II
- Karl-August von Reisach (1800–1869), German Catholic theologian and Cardinal
- Kraft Karl August zu Hohenlohe-Ingelfingen (1827–1892), Prussian general and military writer
- Max Karl August Bruch (1838–1920), German Romantic composer and conductor

== See also ==
- Carl August (disambiguation)
- Charles August
