= Augusta (name) =

Augusta can be a given name or surname. It could be derived from Augustae, a title used for the Empresses of the Roman and Byzantine Empires or simply as a feminine variant of August.

== Given name ==
=== Royalty ===
- Augusta, birth name of Constantina (c. 560–c. 605), Byzantine empress
- Augusta of Denmark (1580–1639), Duchess of Holstein-Gottorp
- Princess Augusta of Saxe-Gotha (1719–1772), later Princess of Wales
- Princess Augusta of Great Britain (1737–1813), later Duchess of Brunswick
- Duchess Augusta of Brunswick-Wolfenbüttel (1764–1788)
- Princess Augusta Sophia of the United Kingdom (1768–1840)
- Princess Augusta of Prussia (1780–1841), German salonist and Electress consort of Hesse
- Princess Augusta of Bavaria (1788–1851)
- Princess Augusta of Hesse-Kassel (1797–1889), later Duchess of Cambridge
- Augusta of Saxe-Weimar-Eisenach (1811–1890), German empress
- Princess Augusta of Cambridge (1822–1916), Grand Duchess of Mecklenburg-Strelitz
- Princess Augusta of Schwarzburg-Sondershausen (1768–1849), Princess of Waldeck and Pyrmont
- Augusta Victoria of Schleswig-Holstein (1858–1921), German empress

=== Other ===
- Augusta Anderson (1875–1951), Swedish film actress
- Augusta Foote Arnold (1844–1904) American naturalist and author
- Augusta Fox Bronner (1881–1966), American psychologist
- Augusta Déjerine-Klumpke (1859–1927), American-born French medical doctor, first female medical intern to work in a hospital in Paris, specialised in neuroanatomy.
- Augusta Holmès (1847–1903), French composer
- Augusta Jansson (1859–1932), Swedish entrepreneur
- Augusta Jane Evans (1835–1909), American Southern author
- Augusta Hall, Baroness Llanover (1802–1896), Welsh heiress, patron of the Welsh arts.
- Augusta Merrill Hunt (1842–1932), American philanthropist, suffragist, temperance leader
- Augusta Ada King, Countess of Lovelace (1815–1852), English mathematician and writer
- Augusta, Lady Gregory (1852–1932), Irish dramatist and folklorist
- Augusta Leigh (1783–1851), half-sister of George Gordon Byron
- Augusta Lenska (flourished 1910s and 1920s), American opera singer
- Augusta Löwenhielm (née von Fersen; 1754–1846), Swedish countess and courtier
- Augusta Lundin (1840–1919) fashion designer
- Augusta Montaruli (born 1983), Italian politician
- Emily Augusta Patmore (1824–1862), British author, Pre-Raphaelite muse, inspiration for poem The Angel in the House.
- Augusta Schrumpf (1813–1900), Norwegian opera singer
- Augusta Schultz (1871–1925), American tennis player
- Augusta Solberg (1856–1922), Norwegian professional photographer
- Augusta Emma Stetson (1842–1928), American Christian Scientist
- Augusta Stowe-Gullen (1857–1943), was a Canadian medical doctor, lecturer and suffragist
- Augusta Tabor (1833–1895), American mining philanthropist
- Mary Augusta Tappage (1888–1978), Shuswap-Métis storyteller
- Augusta Read Thomas (born 1964), American composer
- St. Augusta of Treviso, 1st century virgin martyr
- Augusta W. Urquhart (1870–1960), American social leader and clubwoman
- Augusta Wallace (1929–2008), New Zealand jurist
- Augusta Webster (1837–1894), English poet
- Augusta Harvey Worthen (1823–1910), American educator, author

== Surname ==
- Jaroslav Augusta, Czech painter
- Josef Augusta (disambiguation), multiple people, including:
  - Josef Augusta (ice hockey) (1946–2017), Czech ice hockey player and coach
  - Josef Augusta (paleontologist) (1903–1968), Czechoslovak paleontologist, geologist, and science popularizer
- Pavel Augusta (born 1969), Czech ice hockey player
- Patrik Augusta (born 1969), Czech ice hockey player

== Ship name ==
- Princess Augusta shipwreck

== Fictional characters ==
- "Lady Augusta", a character in Barbara Willard's novel The Richleighs of Tantamount
- Lady Augusta Bracknell, a character in Oscar Wilde's play The Importance of Being Earnest
- Aunt Augusta, a character in Grahame Greene's novel Travels with My Aunt
- Aunt Augusta, a character in P. G. Wodehouse's Jeeves and Wooster novels
- Augusta Longbottom, the grandmother of Neville Longbottom in the Harry Potter books
- Mrs. Augusta Elton (formerly Ms. Hawkins). Mr. Elton's wife in Jane Austen's “Emma”
- Augusta, a character in the 2024 video game Wuthering Waves

== See also ==
- August (name)
