= Hauksson =

Hauksson is an Icelandic patronymic, literally meaning "son of Hauk". Notable people with the name include:

- Ágúst Hauksson (born 1960), Icelandic footballer
- Eiríkur Hauksson (born 1959), Icelandic footballer
- Georg Guðni Hauksson (1961–2011), Icelandic painter
- Haukur Heiðar Hauksson (born 1991), Icelandic footballer
- Óskar Örn Hauksson (born 1984), Icelandic footballer
