= Gustl =

Gustl is a German language pet form of the masculine given names Gustav, August, Augustus and Augustine. Sometimes it also appears directly as a given name. Notable people with the name include:

- August Auinger, nicknamed Gustl Auninger (born 1955), Austrian motorcycle road racer
- Gustl Bayrhammer, born Adolf Gustav Rupprecht Maximilian Bayrhammer (1922–1993), German actor
- Gustl Berauer, born Gustav Berauer (1912–1986), German-Czechoslovak Nordic combined skier
- Gustl French, born Auguste L. French (1909–2004), Austrian-American painter, printmaker and photographer
- Gustl Gstettenbaur, born August Ludwig Gstettenbaur (1914–1996), German actor
- Gustl Mollath (born 1956), German victim of a miscarriage of justice
- Gustl Müller, born Gustav Müller (1903–1989), German Nordic combined and cross-country skier
