= Rendy Saputra =

Indonesian footballer (born 1989)

Personal information
- Date of birth: 16 September 1989 (age 37)
- Place of birth: Palu, Indonesia
- Height: 1.75 m (5 ft 9 in)
- Position: Left-back

Team information
- Current team: Persikad Depok
- Number: 30

Senior career*
Years	Team	Apps	(Gls)
2010–2013	Persibo Bojonegoro	18	(1)
2014	Persik Kediri	14	(0)
2015	Persiba Balikpapan	0	(0)
2016	PSCS Cilacap	17	(3)
2017	Gresik United	5	(0)
2017	Kalteng Putra	4	(0)
2018	Persibat Batang	7	(0)
2019	PSCS Cilacap	19	(3)
2020	Persiraja Banda Aceh	2	(0)
2021	PSCS Cilacap	8	(0)
2022	Persiraja Banda Aceh	16	(0)
2022	Barito Putera	6	(0)
2023–2026	Persipal Palu	56	(4)
2026–	Persikad Depok	4	(0)
- * Club domestic league appearances and goals as of 3 October 2026

Rendy Saputra (born 16 September 1989) is an Indonesian professional footballer who plays as a left-back for Championship club Persikad Depok. Previously he played for Persipal Palu.

== Club career ==
=== Persibo ===
In 2010, he joined Persibo Bojonegoro to play in Indonesian Premier League. In 2013 he left the club.

=== Persik ===
He joined Persik Kediri in 2014 to play in Indonesia Super League. He spent 1 year in this club.

=== Persiba ===
He was signed by Persiba Balikpapan in 2015. However, later in this year, Indonesian Leagues were suspended after only 1 league game, hence, he did not play any game.

=== PSCS Cilacap ===
In 2016, PSCS Cilacap signed him to play with them in ISC B. He helped the team to won the league, and scored in the final match.

=== Persegres ===
In 2017, he moved to Persegres to play with them in Liga 1. However he failed to help the team to avoid relegation by the end of the season.

=== Persibat ===
In 2018, Persibat Batang signed him. They competed in Liga 2. He helped the team to avoid relegation by the end of this season.

=== PSCS Cilacap ===
He rejoined PSCS Cilacap in 2019 to play in Liga 2. However, unlike in previous spell in 2016, this time he failed to help the team to advance to second round by finishing in fifth position in first round.

=== Persiraja ===
In 2020, he joined the newly promoted club, Persiraja Banda Aceh to play in Liga 1. He played in Persiraja first game of the season in match versus Bhayangkara F.C., coming from bench to substitute Agus Suhendra. This season was suspended on 27 March 2020 due to the COVID-19 pandemic. The season was abandoned and was declared void on 20 January 2021.

=== Barito Putera ===
Rendy was signed for Barito Putera to play in Liga 1 in the 2022–23 season.

== Honours ==
PSCS Cilacap

- Indonesia Soccer Championship B: 2016
