= Karl Görner =

Karl Görner may refer to:

- Karl Friedrich Görner, German organist
- Karl August Görner (1806–1884), German actor, director and playwright
