= Agus =

Agus may refer to:

== Given name or nickname ==
=== Indonesia ===
- Agus Salim (1884–1954), Indonesian diplomat, foreign minister of Indonesia
- Agus Subiyanto (born 1967), Indonesian general, current commander of Indonesian military forces
- Agus Suhartono (born 1955), Indonesian admiral, commander of Indonesian military forces
- Agus Martowardojo (born 1956), Indonesian economist and politician, finance minister of Indonesia
- Agus R. Sarjono (born 1962), Indonesian writer
- Agus Gumiwang Kartasasmita (born 1969), Indonesian politician, industry minister of Indonesia
- Agus Kuncoro (born 1972), Indonesian actor
- Agus Harimurti Yudhoyono (born 1978), Indonesian politician and former military officer, son of 6th Indonesian president Susilo Bambang Yudhoyono
- Agus Firmansyah (born 1980), Indonesian footballer
- Agus Cima (born 1983), Indonesian footballer
- Agus Prayogo (born 1985), Indonesian runner
- Agus Suhendra (born 1988), Indonesian footballer
- Agus Adi Prayoko (born 1989), Indonesian artistic gymnast
- Agus Durmaturia (born 1992), Indonesian footballer

=== Spain ===
- Agus (footballer) (born 1985), Spanish footballer
- Agus Medina (born 1994), Spanish footballer

=== Elsewhere ===
- Agus Padilla (born 2001), Uruguayan singer
- Agus Bernasconi (born 1996), Argentine actor and singer

== Surname ==
=== United States ===
- Arlene Agus (1949–2024), American Orthodox Jewish feminist and activist
- David Agus (born 1965), American physician
- Jacob B. Agus (1911–1986), American rabbi and theologian

=== Elsewhere ===
- Gianni Agus (1917–1994), Italian actor
- Zaharah Agus (1922–1978), Malaysian singer

== Other uses ==
- Agus River, in the Philippines
- Atypical glandular cells of undetermined significance
