= Augusts =

Masculine given name

- Gender: Male
- Name day: 3 August

Origin
- Region of origin: Latvia

Other names
- Related names: August

Augusts is a Latvian masculine given name, a cognate of the name August, and may refer to:

- Augusts Annuss (1893–1984), Latvian painter
- Augusts Kepke (1886–19??), Latvian cyclist
- Augusts Kirhenšteins (1872–1963), Latvian microbiologist and educator
- Augusts Malvess (1878–1951), Latvian architect
- Augusts Strautmanis (1907–1990), Latvian chess master
- Augusts Voss (1919–1994), Latvian-Soviet politician and party functionary
