= Otto Brixner =

German judge in the Gustl Mollath case

Otto Brixner (born in 1943) is a former German judge. He was the presiding judge of the 7th Chamber of the criminal division of the Nuremberg-Fürth District Court, Germany.

Brixner became publicly known as part of the chamber that sentenced the justice victim Gustl Mollath to a forensic hospital, where he spent more than seven years. In 2011, research by journalists raised doubts about the allegations against Mollath and the procedure. In 2014, in a retrial of the case, the Regensburg regional court determined that the conditions for confinement of the accused were not satisfied.

== Life and career ==
In the 1950s and 1960s, Otto Brixner's parents operated a restaurant in Herrenberg.

As a teenager, Brixner was athletic and had a talent for handball. Brixner was an active handball player in the 1. FC Nuremberg club, and the TSV 1860 Ansbach as well as the TSV 1891 Frauenaurach. For many years, he also coached the women's handball team of the 1. FC Nürnberg. Brixner was also the coach of the Bavarian Handball C youth until 1991.

After military service in the Bundeswehr, Brixner studied law. On 1 April 1973, he applied as a prosecuting attorney in the Bavarian judicial service. In his three years as a prosecutor, he was considered meticulous and, in his first official assessment, to have been "born" for this job.

In 1976, Brixner became a judge at the Erlangen district court in criminal and civil cases. In October 1987, Brixner changed to the Nuremberg-Fürth district court, also working in criminal and civil matters. In July 1998, after his appointment as chairman of the Nuremberg-Fürth district court, Brixner took over the chairmanship of the 6th Chamber of the criminal division, primarily judging invocations of drug related matters. Most recently, he was chairing the 7th Chamber of the criminal court, responsible for drug and general criminal matters in the first instance.

Brixner never made use of communication in criminal proceedings (a so-called "deal on penalty"). On the other hand, Brixner demanded in interviews with legislators to abolish life imprisonment and introduce temporary sentences of up to 40 years instead.

Brixner retired by the end of June 2008. He was married to Christa Brixner, born Hofbauer (1946-2013). The couple had two children and four grandchildren. Brixner lives in Herzogenaurach. He is a lieutenant colonel in the reserve.

== Trial of Gustl Mollath and allegations against Brixner ==
In September 2003, Gustl Mollath was accused of aggravated assault and false imprisonment to the detriment of his then-wife in a criminal case before the Nuremberg District Court. Since this court considered an accommodation possible, it sent the case to the Nuremberg-Fürth Regional Court. Under the chairmanship of Brixner, the Nuremberg-Fürth Regional Court in August 2006 pronounced Mollath not guilty by reason of insanity, stating that, while the deeds were proven, the "lack of control capability [...] according to § 20 StGB [...] could not be ruled out". Instead of punishment, Mollath was confined to forensic treatment in a closed psychiatric facility, as, according to the court, he continued to be a threat to society. Mollath had, in the opinion of the court, a "paranoid thought system ". This was partly due to the conviction that his former wife, as an employee of the HypoVereinsbank, was involved in a complex system of money laundering.

An internal audit report of the HypoVereinsbank from 2003 supports much of Mollath's money laundering allegations. However, this report had been kept secret by the bank for many years, so that it was not known to the district court of Nuremberg-Fürth in its ruling in 2006. In November 2012, the content of the audit report became public. The report stated that all of Mollath's verifiable allegations were accurate. Mollath's lawyer, Gerhard Strate, successfully applied for a retrial in August 2013. The district court of Regensburg finally came to the conclusion that the prerequisites for Mollath's confinement to psychiatry were not met.

These events resulted in a committee of inquiry in the Bavarian state parliament and public debate. Also, the presiding judge, Brixner, was publicly accused. Jurors and witnesses reported that Brixner acted uncontrollably during the trial and interrupted Mollath whenever he began to talk about the money laundering.

=== Trial ===
Brixner presided at Mollath's trial in 2006. Juror Karl-Heinz Westenrieder said in a TV interview that Brixner had loudly interrupted Mollath and threatened to ban him from the courtroom whenever he mentioned tax evasion or money laundering. A listener during the trial described Brixner as very uncontrolled and angry. Brixner reportedly shouted at Mollath for eight hours without interruption and spoke in a very harsh tone.

=== Possible bias ===
Brixner was accused of partiality as a result of media research.

In mid-April 2013, Brixner reportedly confirmed that Martin Maske, the future husband of Mollath's former wife Petra, was already dating her during the 2006 criminal trial. In 1980, Brixner was Maske's handball coach. Brixner allegedly kept this secret during the entire criminal proceedings.

According to a subsequent written statement before the committee of inquiry in the Bavarian Parliament by a now retired associate judge in the trial of Mollath in 2006, Maske and Mollath's former wife Petra met and talked with Brixner during the Mollath trial. This contradicts Maske's statement that he had no contact with Brixner since the early 1980s. On 5 July 2013, Brixner acknowledged that a meeting with Maske might have taken place during the criminal proceedings in 2006.

=== Denial of the right to be heard / falsification of the facts ===
In his application for reactivating the case, Mollath's later lawyer, Gerhard Strate, alleged among other things that Brixner had determined the makeup of the court himself, refrained from hearing the accused, and willfully falsified the facts of the case using the documentation available to him. Brixner was also repeatedly criticized for never taking note of the 106-page binder provided by Mollath and containing what he claimed to be exculpatory evidence. The outrage against Brixner was ignited by the fact that it is the fundamental obligation of all German courts to take full note of the case of the parties. This arises from the fundamental right to be heard (Art. 103 Para. 1, Basic Law).

=== Influence on the Ministry of Finance ===
In the run-up to the criminal proceedings, in a telephone conversation with the Ministry of Finance, Brixner allegedly halted the investigation by the tax authorities of Mollath's allegations concerning money laundering.
