= M. J. Trow =

Crime writer and historian

- Born: Meirion James Trow; 16 October 1949 (age 76); Ferndale, Rhondda Cynon Taff, Wales
- Occupation: Author
- Writing career
- Genre: Mystery fiction

Meirion James Trow (born 16 October 1949) is a Welsh author of crime fiction, who writes under the name M. J. Trow. He has written mysteries featuring Inspector Lestrade, Peter Maxwell, Kit Marlowe and Margaret Murray.

== Biography ==
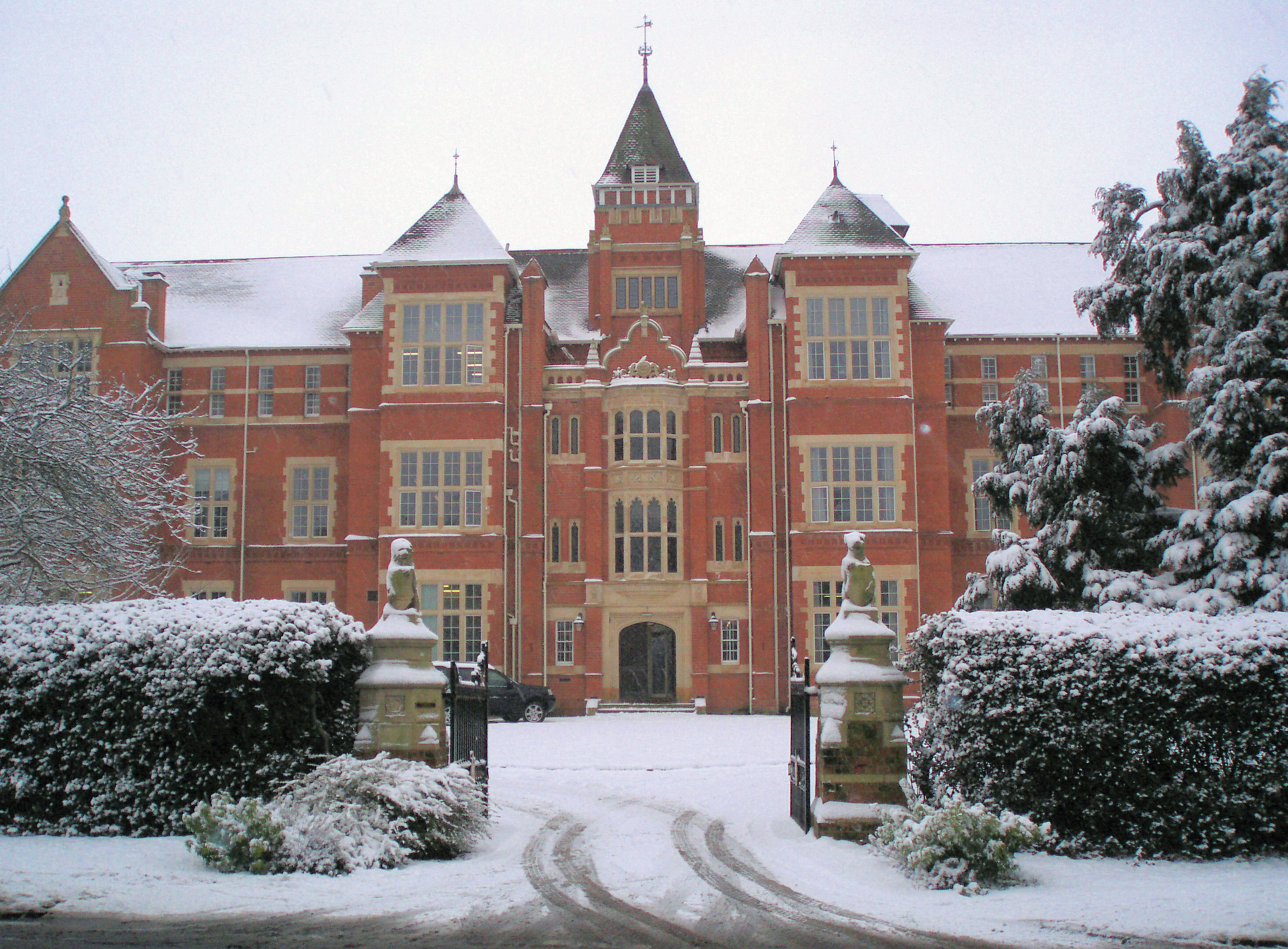
Warwick School

Trow was born in Ferndale, Rhondda Cynon Taff, Wales. He went to Warwick School from 1961 to 1968. In 1968 he went to King's College London to read history. After graduation he spent a year at Jesus College, Cambridge. From 1972 he was a history teacher in Welwyn Garden City in Hertfordshire. On 14 July 1973 he married Carol Mary Long, and in 1976 moved to the Isle of Wight where he worked as a teacher of History and Politics at Ryde High School. He is a member of the Society of Authors and of the Crime Writers' Association.

Trow is also known for his work in theatre, organising and participating in many performances.

In 2008 Trow appeared on the Channel 4 show Richard & Judy talking about his book Spartacus: The Myth and the Man.

== Works ==
=== Fiction ===
Trow has written more than 50 fiction books, principally in three series.

==== "Inspector Lestrade" series ====
Featuring the character from the Sherlock Holmes stories.

Publication order	Title	Set in
1	The Adventures of Inspector Lestrade	1891
2	Brigade: Further Adventures of Inspector Lestrade	1894
3	Lestrade and the Hallowed House	1901
4	Lestrade and the Leviathan	1910
5	Lestrade and the Brother of Death	1912
6	Lestrade and the Ripper	1888
7	Lestrade and the Deadly Game	1908
8	Lestrade and the Guardian Angel	1897
9	Lestrade and the Gift of the Prince	1903
10	Lestrade and the Magpie	1920
11	Lestrade and the Dead Man's Hand	1895
12	Lestrade and the Sign of Nine	1886
13	Lestrade and the Sawdust Ring	1879
14	Lestrade and the Mirror of Murder	1906
15	Lestrade and the Kiss of Horus	1923
16	Lestrade and the Devil's Own	1913
17	Lestrade and the Giant Rat of Sumatra	1905

==== "Peter Maxwell" series ====
Featuring a teacher and amateur sleuth.

1. Maxwell's House (1994)
2. Maxwell's Flame (1995)
3. Maxwell's Movie (1997)
4. Maxwell's War (1999)
5. Maxwell's Ride (2000)
6. Maxwell's Curse (2000)
7. Maxwell's Reunion (2001)
8. Maxwell's Match (2002)
9. Maxwell's Inspection (2003)
10. Maxwell's Grave (2004)
11. Maxwell's Mask (2005)
12. Maxwell's Point (2007)
13. Maxwell's Chain (2008)
14. Maxwell's Revenge (2009)
15. Maxwell's Retirement (2010)
16. Maxwell's Island (2011)
17. Maxwell's Crossing (2012)
18. Maxwell's Return (2014)
19. Maxwell's Academy (2015)
20. Maxwell's Summer (2020)
21. Maxwell's Zoom (2022)

==== "Kit Marlowe" series ====
Featuring the 16th-century playwright and poet as detective.

1. Dark Entry (2011)
2. Silent Court (2011)
3. Witch Hammer (2012)
4. Scorpions's Nest (2012)
5. Crimson Rose (2013)
6. Traitor's Storm (2014)
7. Secret World (2015)
8. Eleventh Hour (2017)
9. Queen's Progress (2018)
10. Black Death (2019)
11. The Reckoning (2020)
12. The Moon Rising (2024)

The Kit Marlowe series is published by Severn House.

==== "Margaret Murray" ====
Featuring the 19th/20th-century archaeologist and feminist.

1. Four Thousand Days (2021)

==== "Britannia" series ====
Co-written with Richard Denham, and set in Sub-Roman Britain.

1. Part I: The Wall (2014)
2. Part II: The Watchmen (2014)
3. Part III: The Warlords (2016)
4. World of Britannia: Historical Companion to the Britannia Series (2016)

=== Non-fiction ===
- Let Him Have It, Chris (1990), on which the film Let Him Have It (1991) was based
- The Wigwam Murder, based on the August Sangret case. (1994, republished by T Squared Books in 2016)
- The Many Faces of Jack the Ripper (1997)
- Who Killed Kit Marlowe?: a Contract to Murder in Elizabethan England (2001)
- Vlad the Impaler: in Search of the Real Dracula (2003)
- Boudicca (2004)
- Cnut: Emperor of the North (2005)
- Spartacus: the Myth and the Man (2006)
- The Pocket Hercules (2006)
- El Cid: the Making of a Legend (2007)
- War Crimes: Underworld Britain in the Second World War (2008)
- A Brief History of Vampires (2010)
- Ripper Hunter: Abberline and the Whitechapel Murders (2012)
- A Brief History of Cleopatra (2013)
- The Killer of the Princes in the Tower (2021)
- The Hagley Wood Murder: Nazi Spies and Witchcraft in Wartime Britain (2023)
