= Josef Augusta =

Josef Augusta may refer to:

- Josef Augusta (ice hockey) (1946–2017), Czech ice hockey player and coach
- Josef Augusta (paleontologist) (1903–1968), Czech paleontologist, geologist and science popularizer
