= August Sangret =

Canadian murderer (1913–1943)

- Pvt. August Sangret, pictured while stationed in Fleet, Hampshire, c. May 1942
- Born: 28 August 1913; Battleford, Saskatchewan, Canada
- Died: 29 April 1943 (aged 29); Wandsworth Prison, London, England
- Other name: The Wigwam Murderer
- Occupation: Military serviceman
- Status: Executed by hanging
- Conviction: Murder
- Penalty: Death

August Sangret (28 August 1913 – 29 April 1943) was a French-Canadian soldier, convicted and subsequently hanged for the September 1942 murder of 19-year-old Joan Pearl Wolfe in Surrey, England. This murder case is also known as the "Wigwam Murder".

The murder of Joan Pearl Wolfe became known as "the Wigwam Murder" due to the fact the victim had become known among locals as the "Wigwam Girl" through her living in two separate, improvised wigwams upon Hankley Common in the months preceding her murder, and that these devices proved to have been constructed by her murderer.

This case marked the first occasion in British legal history in which a murder victim's skull was introduced as evidence at trial, and has been described by true crime author Colin Wilson as "the last of the classic cases."

== Early life ==
=== Sangret ===
August Sangret was born in Battleford, Saskatchewan, on 28 August 1913. He was of mixed race, being part French Canadian and part Cree Indian. Little is known of Sangret's early life, but his family was poor, his early years were blighted with illnesses, and at least one of his siblings died at an early age from tuberculosis. Sangret received no schooling in his childhood, and was unable to read, or to write beyond signing his own name. Nonetheless, he has been described as being modestly intelligent, and in possession of an excellent memory. In addition to English, Sangret spoke the Cree language fluently, and learned some of the traditional skills of his ancestors in his youth, some of which were honed throughout the years he worked as a farm labourer in the town of Maidstone in the 1920s. As a result of this outdoor work, Sangret developed a lithe, muscular physique.

At the age of 17, Sangret received the first of many diagnoses that he had contracted a venereal disease. On this first occasion, upon medical advice, he had unsuccessfully attempted to cure himself using a potassium permanganate solution, before admitting himself to a Battleford hospital to undergo extensive treatment for a bladder obstruction. This would prove to be the first of at least six occasions in which Sangret would receive treatment for a contracted venereal disease, attesting to his sexual promiscuity, although the remaining five instances would occur between 1938 and 1942. (Note: In the autumn of 1942, Sangret submitted a blood sample to determine whether he was cured of syphilis. The results of this Wassermann test concluded he was free from the disease.)

Throughout the 1930s, Sangret accrued an extensive criminal record, which included six months served in jail for a violent assault committed in 1932, a three-month sentence served in 1938 for threatening to shoot a woman who had spurned him in favour of another suitor, and numerous convictions for both vagrancy and theft. He was regularly unemployed, and enlisted to serve in the Battleford Light Infantry in 1935. This militia regiment trained for just two weeks each year, and Sangret served with this regiment until 1939.

=== Wolfe ===
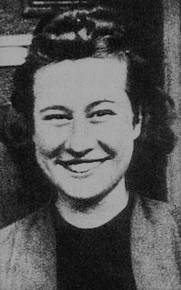
Joan Pearl Wolfe

Joan Pearl Wolfe was born in Tonbridge, Kent, on 11 March 1923, the youngest of three children born to Charles Frederick and Edith Mary (née Groombridge) Wolfe, who had married in 1920.

In April 1930, Joan's father died at the age of 34. Her mother remarried a man named Leslie John Wood in January the following year; they had a daughter in December 1931. The family moved to live in Tunbridge Wells where Joan attended a Catholic convent school in nearby Mark Cross, her tuition fees reportedly paid by a wealthy aunt. She attended this convent school until aged 16, becoming fluent in the French language, and although outwardly pious and known to regularly wear a conspicuous crucifix about her neck, she apparently lacked any serious religious commitment.

Joan's step-father, Leslie, was known locally as proficient chess player but was an eccentric figure who suffered from insomnia and was prone to sudden public outbursts of both paranoia and hostility. In August 1939, when Joan was 16 years old, she returned from school one day to find her step-father lying dead on the floor of their sealed kitchen: he had committed suicide by gassing himself. Her mother subsequently remarried for a second time in 1942; this time to a man named Charles Watts.

With her mother's approval, Wolfe became engaged to an affluent young man from Tunbridge Wells shortly before her 16th birthday in 1939. Reportedly, Joan's fiancé lavished his attention and affections on her, although later the same year, while still engaged, Wolfe first ran away from home. On this first occasion, her mother reported her daughter missing to police, and Joan was discovered approximately one month later in the town of Aldershot. She was driven back to Tunbridge Wells by her fiancé's mother, although shortly after the outbreak of World War II, Wolfe chose to call off her engagement and instead travel to London to train as a storekeeper in an aircraft factory.

After one month, Wolfe left this employment, but did not inform her mother of this fact. It is at this stage in her life in which Wolfe's behaviour is believed to have become increasingly irresponsible and promiscuous, and she is known to have subsequently engaged in casual affairs with several soldiers between 1940 and 1942, most of whom served with the Canadian Army. Wolfe's behaviour from 1940 onward attests to her being gullible, extremely naïve, prone to flights of fancy, yet apparently yearning for stability. Her naïvety may have been compounded by her heavily chaperoned convent upbringing. These facts are evidenced not only in her behaviour, but in the content of the numerous letters she is known to have written to her final lover, who would ultimately prove to be her murderer. Moreover, until her death, she neither drank, smoked or used any profane language in her vocabulary.

Although little beyond subsequent trial testimony is known of Wolfe's relationship with her mother, the evidence which exists attests to Edith Watts being a simple, caring woman, gradually driven to despair by her eldest daughter's increasingly unpredictable and irresponsible behaviour; however, Wolfe herself may have found her mother's attitude somewhat overbearing. Nonetheless, via letter and in person, Edith is known to have repeatedly implored her daughter to return to or remain at home, and to revert to a stable, respectable lifestyle. In addition, contrary to Wolfe's claims that those in positions of authority had seldom made any serious efforts to help her, the police—occasionally at Edith's urging—did intervene on several occasions out of concern for her welfare, and she was repeatedly offered various forms of assistance, but would inevitably revert to her somewhat nomadic lifestyle.

Despite her wayward lifestyle, Joan did maintain sporadic written correspondence with her mother between 1940 and 1942, and she is known to have infrequently returned home to Tunbridge Wells for brief periods—twice in the company of Canadian soldiers she was dating—to visit her family, before opting to return to Godalming or Guildford. She is known to have held several menial forms of employment from 1940 onward; alternately residing in cheap lodgings or sleeping rough. Wolfe is also known to have formed a close friendship with an elderly lady named Kate Hayter in the village of Thursley while she lived and worked in Godalming. According to Wolfe, Hayter allowed her sleep at her bungalow, and to both wash and change her clothes, when she was unemployed.

On each occasion Edith wrote to or spoke with her daughter, she would argue with Joan as to her irresponsible and promiscuous lifestyle. By 1942, the relationship between mother and daughter had deteriorated and, in May, Edith wrote a final letter to her daughter, informing her she was "finished with you. I have been more than fair to you; forgiven you for things no other mother would have done ... You said something about repaying me for all I have done for you ... Joan, I shall be paid in full the day you come and truthfully say, 'Mum, I'm going to be a good girl'. Joan, that will be the happiest day of my life."

== War years ==
On 19 June 1940, nine months after Canada had proclaimed her intention to join the war effort, Sangret chose to enlist as a full-time soldier in the Regina Rifle Regiment. Shortly thereafter, his regiment was transferred to Dundurn Camp. His career as a soldier is marred with several blemishes, and he was repeatedly punished for both minor and major infractions of military discipline, including several instances in which he was reported absent without leave (although no record exists of Sangret ever being returned to barracks against his will). Throughout his military service, he never advanced beyond the rank of private.

Sangret's regiment was deployed to Britain on 24 March 1942. He was initially stationed in Fleet, Hampshire, before being posted to Aldershot and, on 13 July, to Jasper Camp. This final posting was in the market town of Godalming, and Sangret became one of an estimated 100,000 soldiers stationed in the vicinity of Witley and Thursley in 1942. At Jasper Camp, Sangret enrolled in a newly formed 12-week educational course for soldiers lacking in elementary education. While stationed in Godalming, Sangret became acquainted with Joan Pearl Wolfe.

The same year Sangret's regiment was posted to Britain, Joan Wolfe became engaged to a Canadian soldier named Francis Hearn, who returned to Canada on 15 July, having previously promised to marry her (which he had likely known was improbable due to his imminent posting to Canada). Wolfe is known to have thereafter worn a ring given to her by Hearn, and to have occasionally referred to herself as his wife. On one occasion, she is known to have falsely informed a female acquaintance she and Hearn had married in London, and that she and he were both "heartbroken" at his being posted back to Canada.

=== Acquaintance and courtship ===
On 17 July 1942, the day after Hearn left for Canada, Joan Wolfe and August Sangret met for the first time in a pub in Godalming. According to Sangret, he had first noted Wolfe when she walked toward a bar and ordered a lemonade, to which he had asked her when she subsequently sat near him whether she was able to purchase "anything stronger", and Wolfe—whom he described as being "rather scruffy" and downcast in spirit—had simply replied that she "didn't drink anything stronger". He and Wolfe had then begun to talk, and later walked through a local park, before engaging in intercourse in a field close to the River Wey. The two then parted company, having arranged to meet again. As would often subsequently occur, Wolfe did not keep her next date, but Sangret and a fellow soldier named Hartnell did by chance encounter her outside a Godalming fish and chip shop on 21 July. Wolfe had apparently agreed to date Hartnell on this evening, but became notably upset when Hartnell suggested tossing a coin to determine whether he or Sangret should "have her" that evening. In response, Hartnell simply left Wolfe and Sangret, and the pair were briefly detained by police, before being released. Sangret took Wolfe to the undergrowth close to Witley Camp that evening, and on this date, upon being informed by Wolfe she had "nowhere to stay", constructed the first wigwam for he and Wolfe to meet. Sangret described this first temporary shelter as being "a little shack with limbs and stuff." He spent the night with Wolfe in this device, returning to barracks at 6 a.m., having given Joan his photograph, address, and arranging to meet her in Godalming that evening. He later furnished this spartan pine structure with army blankets.

Sangret and Wolfe subsequently met on a regular—yet unreliable—basis in which he would meet her at approximately 7 p.m., then return to barracks to answer the 10 p.m. roll call, before returning to the wigwam (which he referred to as "the shack") to spend the night with her. Early in their courtship, this first wigwam he had constructed was discovered, and Wolfe evicted from the structure; in response, Sangret constructed a second, larger device for he and Wolfe to meet in his off-duty hours, again constructed using the traditional skills of his Cree ancestors he had honed in his youth, and again located close to his base on Hankley Common (then an army training ground regularly used for military exercises). Each structure was devised from long poles, saplings and branches covered by sheets of birch bark and bracken. The tools used for constructing these shelters included a small, crooked knife that is unique to the Cree.

On 23 July, Wolfe was admitted to hospital, having fainted in a Guildford street. She informed Sangret of this fact in a letter, imploring him to visit her (Sangret did attempt to visit on this date, but missed official visiting hours and was thus refused entry). Three days later, she wrote a second letter to Sangret, reading in part:

My Dear August, Well, I hope you are well, as I have not seen or heard from you. It is so very lonely here without anyone to speak to, and there is so much I want to tell you. They are going to try and get me somewhere to stay in Godalming, or if this is not possible, in Guildford. Just one week has passed since I have known you, dear. It seems such a long time. I hope you will try and come and see me [in hospital], as I want to tell you when I can come out because someone will have to meet me, and you are all I have in the world. Of course if you don't want to come I shall understand, August, but I am sure I shall never understand men. I do not know enough about them, but I can live and learn. Anyway, I am pretty sure we are going to have a tiny wee one, maybe that is why you do not want to come and see me because you think that? I hope not anyway, but dear, I would not blame you one little bit, if you did not want to marry me because I really am too young, and too old-fashioned to be married. I regret what we did now it is too late, for I still say it is wicked. I guess you think I am silly, and I suppose I am, but remember I was brought up in a strict Catholic school. We were taught to have a baby before you were married was a sin. I do not know anything about babies. Well, I suppose I shall have to close this letter now, so au revoir (daddy). God bless you always dear. Joan.

(Although pathologists who later examined Wolfe's body were unable to determine whether she had been pregnant at the time of her death, had she been so at the time she wrote this letter on 26 July, Sangret—having known Wolfe for just nine days—could not have fathered the child. If Wolfe was indeed pregnant, the father of the child would likely have been Francis Hearn.)

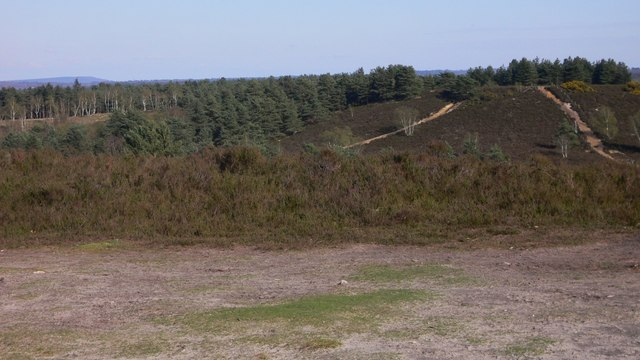
Hankley Common. Joan Wolfe lived in two separate wigwams constructed by August Sangret on this common between July and August 1942

When Wolfe was released from hospital on 28 July, the couple continued to spend a great deal of time together within the wigwam he had constructed. On 31 July, she briefly obtained employment in a factory constructing barrage balloons, earning £2 10s per week, but lost this job as a result of poor timekeeping just three days later; she then informed Sangret of her desire to return to her mother's home, but was unwilling to do so until she had received written permission from her mother. When she received no reply from her mother, Wolfe briefly drifted to London in search of work, but returned to the wigwam after approximately three days. Shortly thereafter, the couple were discovered by a soldier attached to the military police named Donald Brett. Brett instructed Sangret to dismantle the wigwam, and Wolfe—residing on army territory—to move away from the area. Sangret did deconstruct this first wigwam, and almost immediately constructed a second device just 800 yards from where he had built the first. This second device was constructed by Sangret in mid- to late-August, using birch saplings and tied with parcel string he had stolen from barracks, although he later claimed he and Wolfe had lived in this second wigwam for just two nights, before the pair had scoured the village of Witley on 23 August, in an unsuccessful search for lodgings.

That same evening the pair had searched for lodgings, Sangret was detained by the military police, and Wolfe escorted by the Surrey Police to a Guildford hospital (where she would remain until 1 September) in order that she would be in a safe and secure environment. At 11 a.m. the following morning, Sangret was arrested by the military police upon the charge of illegally keeping a girl within the camp precincts. The pair were allowed to talk with one-another via telephone, and Joan emphasised to a civilian policeman present that the pair intended to wed. Sangret himself is known to have visited his commanding officer on 24 August, seeking official permission to marry Joan, although he was informed he would need both her mother's approval due to her technical status as a minor, and official permission from the Canadian government. (Sangret was provided with a formal marriage application form, but never sought assistance from his colleagues in completing and returning this document.)

On one occasion in which Sangret visited Wolfe at the Guidford hospital prior to her absconding on 1 September, he was informed by Wolfe herself that doctors who had examined her were "uncertain" whether she was pregnant.

== September 1942 ==
On 1 September, Wolfe obtained a one-day pass to leave Guildford hospital, informing the matron of her intentions to visit the cinema and shop for new clothes. She never returned to the hospital; instead returning to Sangret, before spending the night sleeping alone in the waiting rooms at Guildford railway station.

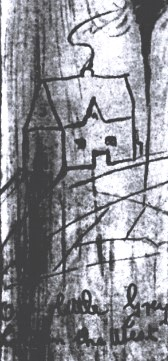
One of the drawings made by Wolfe inside the Thursley cricket pavilion shortly before her murder

Wolfe subsequently moved into an abandoned cricket pavilion in Thursley on or about 3 September, with Sangret providing her with an army-issue blanket and water-bottle stolen from his barracks on this date. In this pavilion, Wolfe would spend extended periods of time, often composing romantic poetry and letters (several of which were smattered with religious overtones), and making childlike drawings of the home into which she evidently envisioned herself and Sangret moving following their marriage. One of these drawings was made on the wall of the cricket pavilion, with a caption reading "Our little Grey home in the West." Beneath this caption, an inscription read: 'J. Wolfe now Mrs. Sangret. England. September 9, 1942'.

Throughout the two weeks in which Joan Wolfe resided within the abandoned cricket pavilion, Sangret visited her with increasing frequency; often when he should have been at base. He regularly brought food for he and Joan to eat together as they discussed their future plans, including the marriage Wolfe evidently yearned for. When they could not meet, Wolfe would send letters to Sangret that would be read to him by a Sergeant Charles Hicks, who would then compose Sangret's replies. The tone and style of Wolfe's letters to Sangret is typically naïve, yet optimistic, and is reminiscent of the letter she had composed on 26 July, with repeated references to her time spent in his company, her hopes for marriage, her general loneliness (which Wolfe is known to have referred to as her "penance"), and her desire to be in his company. On at least one occasion, however, Wolfe does hark toward her frustration at Sangret's apparently repeated accusations of infidelity, to which she wrote: "You know I am in a safe place now anyway, and you will not be able to accuse me of going out with other soldiers. I have never done it since I have known you anyway, but you are so damned jealous you think it; but still we will forget all that now and look forward to the future, when we are married."

As had been the case in July, Wolfe did obtain employment on more than one occasion in the final weeks of her life, but would invariably be fired after a matter of days or weeks due to her unreliability as an employee. To earn money on the numerous occasions she was unemployed, Wolfe—occasionally accompanied by Sangret—would gather blackberries on Hankley Common, which Sangret would sell to his army colleagues for up to 7 shillings. Evidently, Wolfe spent some of this money on knitting provisions, as she is known to have knitted several baby clothes in the final weeks of her life.

On two successive days in the week before her murder, Wolfe was seen by a local resident named William Featherby picking blackberries on the edge of the common, and cooking vegetables over an open fire. On the second of these two occasions, Sangret had been inside the pavilion. The last known individual to see Joan Wolfe alive was a woman named Alice Curtis, who observed Wolfe, in the company of a "dark-complexioned" soldier with black hair, walking towards the hamlet of Brook on Sunday, 13 September.

=== Disappearance ===
By 14 September, the relationship between Sangret and Wolfe had lasted 60 days. On this date, Joan Pearl Wolfe disappeared. According to Sangret's subsequent trial testimony, as he returned from the pavilion to barracks that morning, Joan had informed him of her intentions to return to Kate Hayter's Thursley residence. That evening, Sangret and a fellow soldier named Joseph Wells decided to visit a Thursley pub. On two occasions that evening, Sangret is known to have left Wells alone in the pub as he returned to the cricket pavilion. Each time he returned, he explained to Wells he had been searching for Wolfe out of concern for her welfare. On one of these occasions, he did not return for over 30 minutes.

In an apparent effort to construct an alibi, Sangret visited the home of Kate Hayter on 15 September, inquiring whether she had seen Joan, and leaving the pink baby clothes Wolfe had knitted in the weeks prior to her murder in Hayter's possession. The same evening, he informed Wells his water-bottle and knife were missing, and that he suspected both items were in Wolfe's possession.

Sangret is known to have given several conflicting explanations as to Wolfe's whereabouts to his army colleagues in the weeks following her disappearance: to some, he claimed Joan had simply returned home and the "wedding is off"; to others, he claimed Joan was in hospital. Furthermore, he is also known to have visited his Provost Sergeant, Harold Wade, on 21 September, ostensibly seeking official assistance in his search for Wolfe. To Wade, Sangret confided he and Joan had "quarrelled" after he had informed her of his indifferent attitude to marriage. In response to this explanation, Wade questioned Sangret as to why he should be so concerned as to Joan's whereabouts, given that he evidently had no intentions of marrying her. To this, Sangret had replied: "If she should be found, and anything has happened to her, I don't want to be mixed up with it."

Within weeks of Wolfe's disappearance, Sangret had begun casually dating local women. As had been the case when he corresponded via letter with Joan Wolfe, he asked his army colleagues to compose his replies due to his illiteracy. One of these colleagues to compose letters for Sangret was a sapper named Clarence Bear, whom Sangret asked to write a letter to a woman with whom he intended to spend an upcoming period of leave. When Bear voiced his concerns as to the implications this behaviour may have upon his relationship with Joan Wolfe, Sangret had replied, "She'll never find out."

== Discovery ==
At 10:20 a.m. on 7 October 1942, two Royal Marines named William Moore and Geoffrey Cooke, patrolling a section of Hankley Common known as Houndown Wood on a routine military exercise, passed a high mound of earth which had been purposely bulldozed to simulate training upon rough terrain for tank crews. Protruding through the soil of a freshly dug patch of earth on a slope, Moore observed what appeared to be an exposed human arm. Looking closer at the hand of this exposed limb, he further noted that the flesh upon two of the fingers and the thumb had been gnawed away by rats or other vermin, and that a foot also protruded from the earth.

Moore and his colleague did not interfere with the body, but immediately returned to base to report their find to their sergeant. Subsequently, Lieutenant Norman McLeod inspected the site of their discovery, and immediately called the police. The first officers at the scene were Superintendents Richard Webb and Thomas Roberts of Surrey Police; both men deduced the experience of Scotland Yard was required, and cordoned off the area until the arrival that afternoon of Detective Chief Inspector Edward Greeno and Detective Sergeant Fred Hodge.

At the request of Superintendent Webb, Dr. Eric Gardner, pathologist to the Surrey County Coroner, and forensic pathologist Dr. Keith Simpson were both summoned to conduct the excavation of the remains. Both men arrived at the crime scene the following day.

The victim was dressed in a green-and-white summer frock with a lace collar and woollen ankle-socks. Her underclothes had not been removed, suggesting that she had not been subjected to a sexual assault prior to her murder. She was lying face down in a shallow, makeshift grave which had later been disturbed by a passing military vehicle, possibly a half-track, which had loosened the soil and exposed her arm and foot. The left arm was folded beneath the chest, with the exposed right arm notably outstretched, indicating the victim had likely been dragged to the location where she lay.

The body itself was badly decomposed, with the head, chest and abdominal cavity described by Simpson as being a "seething mass of maggots", which had eaten much of the soft body tissue, including the head and neck, save for a small section of scalp and hair. A headscarf was found knotted around the victim's neck, but the knot itself was extremely slack, instantly enabling both men to dismiss strangulation as the cause of death; instead, both men strongly speculated the cause of death had been the extensive blunt trauma to the skull, which had "all but collapsed" in the attack. The extent of decomposition indicated that the victim had likely died between five and seven weeks prior to her discovery. Furthermore, the murderer had dragged his victim uphill to the location where he had buried her; this conclusion was further supported by the presence of three parallel scrapes upon the skin of the right ankle, which corresponded with tears in the right sock.

The body was removed and taken to Guy's Hospital, to await a formal autopsy.

=== Autopsy ===
On the evening of 8 October, Dr. Simpson conducted an autopsy upon the victim, ascertaining that the body was that of a Caucasian female, approximately 17 to 20 years old and 5 feet, 4 inches in height. Her cropped hair was naturally sandy brown in colour, but had been bleached blonde several weeks before her death.

Having carefully reconstructed the skull by wiring together all 38 fragments that could be found, Simpson clearly revealed a large impact site at the rear of the skull measuring five inches in length and one-and-three-quarter inches in breadth, further affirming his earlier conclusions at the crime scene. This injury, coupled with a fracture to the victim's right cheek bone, led Simpson to conclude that the victim had died as a result of a single, heavy blow to back of the head, inflicted while the victim was lying face down. The weapon which had delivered this fatal injury was a pole or bough of wood, and the blow from this weapon had caved in the skull. The commensurate positioning of the fracture to the cheek bone further supported the conclusion the victim had been killed as she lay face down on the ground. These injuries would have induced rapid unconsciousness, and death would have resulted within minutes.

I thought it had begun in the dell where Joan's papers were found, probably with the stabbing attack on her head ... She must have run downhill, screaming with pain and fear, inviting pursuit to silence her. Her crucifix ornament must have been torn or pulled away and the contents of her handbag spilled out as she ran ... Dizzy and faint because of her head wounds and with blood running from her head wound into her eyes, she was already stumbling at the rivulet, where a tripwire had been laid by exercising troops ... She fell heavily, knocking out her front teeth and further dazing herself, but was almost certainly still able to cry out for help, still inviting a silencing injury ... Lying prone, with her right cheek on the ground, when she was struck the final blow with the birchwood [bough].

— Excerpts of Dr. Keith Simpson's formal conclusions as to how the injuries inflicted to Wolfe corresponded with physical evidence at and in the vicinity of the crime scene. 17 October 1942.

Numerous knife wounds were also discovered on the forehead, right forearm and right hand of the body, most likely inflicted before the victim had died. The positioning of the knife wounds on the skull indicated the victim had been facing her attacker throughout this initial assault; this was further supported by the wounds in the right forearm, which suggested the victim had raised her hands to protect herself from these knife blows (no flesh remained on the left hand or forearm to identify potential similar wounds). The head wounds had been inflicted on the left section of the skull and forehead, consistent with the attacker being a right-handed individual. Curiously, the tissues around the stab wounds in the victim's forearm and hand had been pulled outwards as the knife had been extracted—indicating the end of the blade had a curved or hooked point, resembling a parrot's beak. Three of the wounds located on the top of the reconstructed skull were particularly distinctive, being circular countersunk holes, further supporting this conclusion.

In addition to these knife and blunt trauma injuries, the victim's jaw had also been broken and three teeth dislodged, although it was impossible to determine whether these injuries had been sustained through a fall or her being struck in the face. Furthermore, Simpson concluded all these injuries had been inflicted while the victim was alive and most probably conscious. In his view, Dr. Simpson concluded that, in view of the trauma sustained, the victim had received several stab wounds to the head as she faced her attacker, and that she had attempted to ward off these blows with her hands and arms before attempting to run from her assailant; she had then either stumbled to the ground or fainted, likely dislodging three of her teeth in the fall, before her murderer had inflicted the fatal blow to her skull, with this blow also shattering her cheek bone.

The extent of saponification of body fats in the remaining breast and thigh tissue of the victim, in conjunction with the continuous presence of heat generated by maggot infestation, led Dr. Simpson to revise the length of time the victim had lain undiscovered to one month, meaning the victim had died in early- to mid-September. Moreover, the extensive infestation of maggots indicated she had lain exposed to the elements for a minimum of 24 hours before her murderer had buried her body.

=== Search of Hankley Common ===
On 12 October, a search team consisting of 60 police constables discovered a heavy, tapered bough of birchwood approximately 350 yards from the burial site. This bough had been sharpened at both ends, and was found just 16 yards from a military tripwire. Upon closer inspection, investigators noted several short strands of blonde human hair crushed into the bark, strongly indicating Wolfe had fallen to the ground at this location before her murderer had used this bough to inflict the vast depressed fracture to her skull. (This theory would be supported by Dr. Simpson, who confirmed the dimensions of this bough perfectly matched the cavity within the victim's skull, and that the hair samples upon the instrument matched those retrieved from her scalp.)

Three days later, within a 400-yard radius of the burial site, these officers also discovered numerous personal artefacts belonging to the victim including her shoes and purse, a handbag containing a rosary, a bar of soap, and a distinctive elephant charm. In a dell above where the tripwire and bough had been discovered, officers discovered a crucifix, a National Registration Card issued to one Joan Pearl Wolfe, a blank document issued by the Canadian Army to men requesting permission to marry, and a letter written by Wolfe to a Canadian soldier named August Sangret, informing him of her pregnancy, and her hopes of his agreeing to marry her. Also found were a further fragment of the victim's skull, and a tooth.

The personal possessions belonging to the victim were identified by Edith Watts as belonging to her daughter. Furthermore, Superintendent Richard Webb had earlier recognised Wolfe's name, having interviewed her in both July and August after she had been taken into custody due to concerns for her welfare, due to her living on the common in makeshift shelters. On both occasions, she had worn a distinctive green-and-white dress like that discovered upon the body, and at Webb's own instigation, Wolfe had been sent to hospital. Furthermore, Webb was able to recall her companion had been the Canadian soldier mentioned in the letter discovered close to her body.

== Interrogation ==
Following the identification of Wolfe's body, Chief Inspector Greeno and Superintendent Richard Webb informally interviewed Sangret at the Godalming army camp where he was stationed on 12 October. In this interview, Sangret freely admitted to having dated Wolfe, but insisted he had not seen her since 14 September, when she had failed to keep a date with him. He had not taken their relationship too seriously, being more interested in a woman he had earlier met in Glasgow. Furthermore, although he had not reported Wolfe as missing to police, he had reported her disappearance to his Provost Sergeant. When shown articles of Wolfe's clothing, Sangret formally identified these garments as belonging to her.

Upon interviewing Sangret's army colleagues, Inspector Greeno learned of the alternating and conflicting explanations he had given to these men as to Wolfe's disappearance, and that his demeanour had alternated between bouts of unperturbedness and anxiety over the previous weeks. Moreover, one colleague remarked to Greeno that, upon learning of the discovery of Wolfe's body, Sangret had seemed "on edge".

=== Statement ===
Greeno subsequently requested permission from the army to take Sangret to Godalming police station to conduct a formal interview. This request was granted, and Sangret was taken to this police station later that day.

At Godalming police station, Sangret was asked whether he would tell all he knew of Wolfe, and his association with her. In response, he casually replied, "Yes, all right." The subsequent 17,000-word verbal statement Sangret delivered would prove to be the then-longest statement ever made in British criminal history; taking a policeman four days to compose in longhand in interview sessions totaling almost 19 hours. These interviews were conducted between 12 and 16 October (on 15 October, no interviews were conducted due to Inspector Greeno being occupied with other police matters). In addition to formally interviewing Sangret on these dates, Greeno had Sangret show investigators the various locations he mentioned in his statement, such as Kate Hayter's bungalow, and the locations of the two wigwams he had constructed. Throughout the days in which he was questioned, Sangret remained at the police station.

In his statement, Sangret discussed in exhaustive detail his relationship with Wolfe, and his actions following her disappearance. He did concede to having had an argument with Wolfe regarding his reluctance to marry her on the final occasion he had seen her, but denied having either caused her any harm, or any knowledge of her current whereabouts. When questioned as to the whereabouts of his army-issue knife, Sangret claimed he had given this instrument to Wolfe.

After completing his statement on the morning of 16 October, Sangret was released, pending further inquiries. Prior to his release, however, Sangret is known to have informed Greeno: "I suppose you have found her. Everything points to me. I guess I shall get the blame," before burying his head in his hands.

== Later discoveries and arrest ==
Following his formal questioning, Sangret was returned to barracks. His army blanket and uniform had been confiscated at Godalming police station, and sent to a Dr. Roche Lynch at St Mary's Hospital to undergo Benzidine testing. Dr. Lynch was able to conclude that both the trousers and blanket had recently been washed in a basic and clumsy manner, and that each garment bore evidence of bloodstains. Furthermore, Lynch was able to deduce that the positioning of the bloodstains within the army blanket was consistent with where blood would have seeped from Wolfe's head and arm wounds, had she been wrapped in this garment.

On 27 November 1942, a distinctive knife with a hooked point resembling a parrot's beak was discovered by a Private Albert Brown, hidden in a waste pipe within the wash-house at Witley barracks. Brown had discovered this instrument when tasked with clearing a blocked drain; he and a colleague immediately handed this knife to Harold Wade, who in turn forwarded the weapon to the Surrey Police. (Subsequent eyewitness testimony would indicate Sangret had excused himself to wash his hands in this wash-room on 12 October, immediately prior to his initial, informal questioning by Inspector Greeno. He had been alone in the wash-room for between three and four minutes, although the water had been cut off at the time.)

The knife itself was not of Canadian issue, but British Army (although subsequent trial testimony would confirm such a model of knife had been issued to the Canadian Army until 1939). A Canadian soldier named Samuel Crowle had found this knife embedded in a tree close to one of the wigwams Sangret had earlier constructed in mid-August; he had intended to keep the knife due to its unique blade, but had been advised by a colleague to deliver it to a Corporal Thomas Harding, who had in turn handed the knife to Sangret on 26 August, suspecting the knife had belonged to him, given that Crowle had informed him he had found the knife near a wigwam "with some people talking inside".

Dr. Lynch subjected the knife to similar testing to which he had previously subjected Sangret's army blanket and uniform, although this knife—having been immersed in a drainage system for over six weeks—bore no evidence of bloodstains, hair samples or fingerprints. Nonetheless, Doctors Eric Gardner and Keith Simpson each independently examined the weapon on 3 December and concluded only such a knife could have inflicted the wounds discovered on Wolfe's skull and arm.

On 6 December, Inspector Greeno interviewed Sangret at the Aldershot barracks where he had recently been transferred, before requesting he accompany investigators to Hankley Common to pinpoint the locations he and Wolfe had lived and frequented. Sangret agreed to this request, although he resolutely refused to enter or even glance in the direction of Houndown Wood. Upon returning to Godalming police station, Sangret agreed to submit to a second formal interview, in which Greeno focused largely upon issues regarding the knives he and Wolfe had owned. In this statement, Sangret stated Wolfe had been in possession of a black-handled knife with a hooked point, which she had been given by Francis Hearn. Shortly after 4 p.m. that afternoon, Sangret was formally charged with the murder of Joan Pearl Wolfe. He was held on remand at Brixton Prison, to await committal hearings.

=== Committal hearings ===
Formal committal hearings were held in Guildford between 12 and 20 January 1943, and saw 21 members of the Canadian Army testify as eyewitnesses to Sangret's relationship with Wolfe; his conflicting and indifferent accounts as to her whereabouts following her disappearance; his being in possession of the knife alleged to have been used in her murder; and his movements on critical dates. In addition, Doctors Simpson, Gardner and Lynch each testified as to their collective forensic findings upon Wolfe's body and Sangret's clothing and army blanket. Also to testify at these committal hearings was Inspector Greeno, who read in full Sangret's voluminous statements to the court before testifying as to Sangret's admission prior to his initial release from custody that he had deduced these official matters were in motion due to her body being found.

On 20 January, Mr Justice Macnaghten declared enough evidence had been presented to warrant Sangret being brought to trial, and set a date of 24 February for the trial to commence at the Surrey County Hall.

== Trial ==
The trial of August Sangret for the murder of Joan Pearl Wolfe began at the Surrey County Hall on 24 February 1943. He was tried before Mr Justice Macnaghten and a jury. The clerk of assize opened proceedings on this date by asking Sangret to stand to hear a formal recitation of the charge, and to state his plea. Sangret formally stated his plea of not guilty to the charge against him; the Clerk then informed the jury: "It is for you to say whether he is guilty or not guilty, and to hearken to the evidence."

In his opening statement on behalf of the Crown, Eric Neve outlined the prosecution's intention to prove beyond a reasonable doubt that Sangret had murdered Wolfe—whom he referred to as the Wigwam Girl—on or about 14 September 1942. Neve then defined for the jury the very definition of the crime of murder, before outlining the relationship between the decedent and the accused; quoting from letters exchanged between the two and harking to the two wigwams Sangret had constructed on Hankley Common and in which he had lived with the decedent in the weeks prior to her murder. Neve further outlined the prosecution's contention that Sangret had constructed these wigwams with the same distinctive knife he had subsequently used in her murder, before displaying Exhibits 3 and 4: the birch bough used to inflict the substantial fracture to the rear of her skull, and the distinctive black-handled knife with a hooked point, which he had attempted to conceal at Witley barracks.

Neve further outlined that Sangret had told several conflicting stories of Wolfe's whereabouts in the weeks she had been missing, and that forensic experts would testify that only a distinctive knife such as Exhibit 4 could have inflicted the wounds discovered on Wolfe's forehead. Furthermore, Neve stated that bloodstains had been discovered on Sangret's trousers and army blanket, and that Dr. Roche Lynch would testify as to the positioning of the bloodstains found upon the army blanket being consistent with where blood would have seeped from Wolfe's head and arm wounds, indicating Sangret had initially wrapped her body in this garment.

Sangret's lawyer, Linton Thorp, rejected the prosecution's contention that the knife alleged to have been the murder weapon had belonged to Sangret in his opening speech for the defence; emphasising his client's insistence that he had never owned such a knife and adding that the knife in question was of British Army issue as opposed to Canadian. Furthermore, Thorp added that a knife found some 23 paces from the murder scene had been discarded by a policeman who had initially attached no importance to the find, and that repeated searches to relocate this knife had been unsuccessful.

Thorp further elaborated on Sangret's insistence he had loved Wolfe; informing the jurors that several letters written by Wolfe had been found in his possession at the time of his arrest and that, following her disappearance, Sangret had made efforts to locate her. Moreover, Thorp emphasised that Wolfe's history of liaising with soldiers in the two years prior to her murder, coupled with her solitary and nomadic lifestyle, meant any number of the 100,000 soldiers stationed in the vicinity of Witley and Thursley could have been her actual murderer.

=== Witness testimony ===
Formal witness testimony began on the first day of the trial, with 17 prosecution witnesses called to testify on this date, including the Detective Superintendent of the Surrey Constabulary, who formally introduced into evidence the birch bough murder weapon found on Hankley Common the previous October, and the knife forwarded to Surrey Police by Provost Sergeant Harold Wade. Also to testify was Wolfe's mother, Edith Watts, who formally identified her daughter's crucifix, purse, and elephant charm which had all been found in and around the dell where her daughter had been attacked, and Sergeant Charles Hicks, who testified as to his regularly reading Wolfe's letters to Sangret, then composing his replies. Hicks further testified that Sangret had only informed him of Wolfe's disappearance on 27 September.

The second day of the trial saw a further 20 prosecution witnesses called to testify, most of whom were military personnel summonsed to testify as to Sangret's conduct with Wolfe prior to her murder, his evident reluctance to commit to the marriage Wolfe had evidently yearned for, his infidelity throughout his relationship with Wolfe, and the differing and contradictory explanations he had given as to her disappearance. One of these witnesses was Provost Sergeant Harold Wade, who testified that Sangret had only informed him of Wolfe's disappearance on 21 September, and that Sangret had informed him of the final conversation he had had with Wolfe prior to her disappearance on this date. According to Wade, when Wolfe—weeping openly—had asked Sangret whether he "care[d] to marry [her] or not", Sangret had responded, "No, I don't". Upon hearing this, Wade testified he had advised Sangret to simply forget her, to which Sangret had replied the reason for his visit was that, had anything happened to Wolfe, he did not wish to be involved in the matter.

Also called to testify on this date was Private Samuel Crowle, who had found the knife introduced as Exhibit 4 close to the second wigwam Sangret had constructed on Hankley Common the previous August. Crowle formally identified the knife as being that which he had discovered on the common and had briefly retained before handing to his superior due to its distinctive blade and a "little nick" he had noted the knife bore. In addition to Crowle's testimony, an American soldier named Raymond Deadman also testified on 25 February as to his becoming acquainted with Wolfe in the week prior to her murder, and to his observing Sangret's possessive nature. In response to questioning by Eric Neve, Deadman explained he had become acquainted with Wolfe on 4 September, and that she had introduced him to Sangret on this date. The following day, he had walked across the common in her company, before they had encountered Sangret, who, Deadman testified, had become angry at seeing her in his company. According to Deadman, Sangret then chided a visibly nervous Wolfe for leaving "the shack" without his permission.

One of the final witnesses to testify on the second day of the trial was Private Joseph Arsenault, who had been stationed at Witley Camp between July and October 1942, and had become acquainted with Sangret. Arsenault testified as to his observing Sangret, alone, cleaning his trousers in the camp wash-room in an effort to remove dark stains he (Arsenault) had seen on the garment. In response to cross-examination by Linton Thorp, Arsenault conceded he could not pinpoint the precise date he had seen Sangret washing his trousers in the wash-room, and that the date in question could have been anytime he had been stationed at Witley Camp.

The knife the prosecution contended had inflicted the distinctive injuries to Wolfe's forehead was introduced in evidence as Exhibit 4, with Corporal Thomas Harding testifying as to his handing this weapon to Sangret on 26 August. In response to questioning by his defence, Sangret denied he had ever seen the knife introduced into evidence, and claimed he had never being given such a weapon by Corporal Harding. Furthermore, Sangret described the knife he had used to construct both wigwams as belonging to Wolfe. This weapon, he claimed, had both a marlin spike and a can opener, and he had been informed by Wolfe that the knife had been given to her by Francis Hearn. In addition, Sangret insisted he had never taken his own army-issue knife off barracks.

Two of the prosecution's main witnesses were Drs Keith Simpson and Eric Gardner, who testified on the second and third days of the trial respectively. Both pathologists testified as to the recovery of Wolfe's body—which they noted had been "covered, rather than buried"—and their subsequent examination of her remains, both in situ on the common, and—with regards to Dr. Simpson—at Guy's Hospital. With the aid of enlarged photographs of the wounds discovered upon Wolfe's skull, Dr. Simpson testified that only a knife such as that with the "peculiarities" of the one discovered hidden in the waste pipe at Witley barracks could have inflicted the distinctive circular wounds discovered upon Wolfe's skull. In relation to the partially extracted muscle tissue and ligaments discovered in the victim's right forearm and hand, Simpson confirmed such trauma could only have occurred through a distinctive, hooked blade retaining the tissue upon extraction.

Against overruled objections from Linton Thorp, Dr. Simpson then retrieved Wolfe's skull from a cardboard box to demonstrate for the jury just how this knife fitted the wounds discovered in Wolfe's skull, and how the channel tracts to the right of each wound again matched the dimensions of Exhibit 4. Simpson also explained to the jury how the positioning of these wounds indicated she had likely been facing her right-handed attacker when these wounds were delivered. Although both Simpson and Gardner conceded the knife introduced as Exhibit 4 may not have been the actual murder weapon as opposed to another, precise replica issue, both pathologists dismissed the possibility that any standard-issue American or Canadian Army knife presented before them could have created these distinctive, countersink wounds. (No other soldier stationed at Witley Camp had been in possession of such a weapon.)

Following the testimony of Dr. Gardner, Dr. Roche Lynch took the witness stand to discuss the results of the Benzidine tests he had conducted upon Sangret's army blanket, uniform, water-bottle, and the knife discovered at Witley barracks. Lynch testified that both the uniform and blanket had recently been washed, albeit clumsily. Nonetheless, through conducting Benzidine tests upon each garment, he had concluded each bore evidence of bloodstains, whereas no blood had been discovered on the knife or water-bottle.

In cross-examination of Dr. Lynch, Linton Thorp did succeed in getting Lynch to concede the washing of the garments in question prior to their examination meant he (Lynch) could not definitively state these stains had originated from human blood. Thorp then attempted to suggest these stains, if sourcing from human blood, may have been caused through human scratching through lice infestation; Dr. Lynch countered this assertion by stating it would be physically impossible to produce such extensive staining through scratching.

=== Defence testimony ===
On 26 February, Linton Thorp called Sangret to testify on his own behalf (this testimony would last until 1 March). In response to questioning from his counsel, Sangret chronologically discussed his two-month courtship with Wolfe, the improvised homes he had built for her, and their marriage plans. In a direct contradiction to the earlier testimony of several of his colleagues and Provost Sergeant Harold Wade (whom he contended were simply lying), Sangret claimed he had fully intended to marry Wolfe, and denied either arguing with her on the final occasion he had seen her on 13 September, or ever refusing to marry her. In relation to the knife Corporal Thomas Harding had given to him on 26 August, Sangret emphatically denied he had been given the knife the prosecution contended he had used in her murder on this date, and insisted he had been given a distinctly different, Canadian-issue knife introduced into evidence as Exhibit 34.

Upon completion of defence counsel questioning, Sangret was subjected to an intense cross-examination by Eric Neve, who repeatedly raised the inconsistencies, contradictions and "convenience" in Sangret's claims—both in his trial testimony and the two statements he had given to Inspector Greeno—as opposed to the witness testimony and forensic evidence presented. These questions related to such issues as Sangret's accounts of his whereabouts both before and after Wolfe's disappearance; his evident infidelity in light of his claims of his intentions to marry her; his claims he had never argued with Wolfe; his denial of ever being in possession of the knife introduced into evidence; and the numerous, differing, earlier explanations he had given to his colleagues and his Provost Sergeant as to Wolfe's disappearance.

=== Closing arguments ===
The trial of August Sangret lasted seven days, and saw 52 witnesses testify on behalf of the prosecution, with only Sangret himself testifying in his own defence. Following the conclusion of Neve's cross-examination of Sangret on 2 March, both prosecution and defence attorneys delivered their closing arguments to the jury. In the closing argument delivered by the prosecution, Eric Neve outlined the testimony presented by forensic experts, investigators and Sangret's fellow servicemen on behalf of the prosecution; all of which Neve asserted, when combined, sufficiently proved Sangret had slain "this unfortunate girl" before vainly attempting to establish an alibi and conceal the murder weapon.

Following the prosecution's closing argument, Linton Thorp argued on behalf of the defence. In his closing argument, Thorp reiterated his client's love for Wolfe, and stated that all evidence and testimony presented by the prosecution was circumstantial. Thorp further emphasised to the jury that no conclusive proof existed that Sangret had murdered Wolfe.

Upon completion of both counsels' closing arguments, Macnaghten delivered his final instructions to the jury: "That the girl was murdered is not in dispute; that she was murdered by some man is also quite plain. The only question you have to determine is: Have the Crown satisfied you beyond all real doubt that the prisoner, August Sangret, is the man who murdered her? I can only conclude by saying what I said at the beginning: when dealing with a case of circumstantial evidence, you must be satisfied beyond all doubt before you find the prisoner is guilty."

Following this final instruction from Macnaghten, the jury retired to consider their verdict, taking Wolfe's skull and the knife alleged by the prosecution to have inflicted the preliminary stab wounds to her body to assist in their deliberations.

== Conviction ==
The jury deliberated for two hours before announcing they had reached their verdict on the afternoon of 2 March: Sangret was found guilty of Wolfe's murder, although this verdict was accompanied with a strong recommendation as to mercy. Passing sentence, Mr Justice Macnaghten donned his formal black cap and made the following speech:

August Sangret, the jury have found that it was you who murdered Joan Wolfe, and none who heard the evidence can doubt the justice of the verdict. They have accompanied it with a strong recommendation for mercy; that will be forwarded to the proper quarter. It only remains for me to pronounce the sentence prescribed by law. The sentence of the court is that you be taken from here to the place from whence you came, and from there to a place of lawful execution, and that there you be hanged by the neck until you be dead; and that your body afterwards be buried within the precincts of the prison in which you shall have been last confined. And may the Lord have mercy on your soul.

Before Macnaghten passed the death sentence, Sangret was asked by the clerk of assize whether he wished to address the court. In response, Sangret declared: "I am not guilty, sir. I never killed that girl."

=== Appeal ===
Following his conviction, August Sangret uncustomarily filed a notice of appeal against his sentence on his own behalf, without first consulting his defence counsel. His appeal was heard on 13 April before three judges in the Court of Appeal: the Lord Chief Justice (the Viscount Caldecote), Mr Justice Humphreys, and Mr Justice Lewis. As was customary, both original counsels were present at this hearing, although as Sangret's appeal had been filed without his first consulting with his defence counsel, neither Linton Thorp or his co-counsel, Laurence Vine, were able to challenge either the trial conduct or the verdict beyond the contents of Sangret's personal appeal (in which he had simply stated his disagreement with the guilty verdict, proclaimed his innocence, and claimed that he had not owned the knife identified as being used in Wolfe's murder). Nonetheless, Thorp did emphasise the jury's strong recommendation to mercy.

The same day they had convened to hear Sangret's appeal, the Court of Appeal upheld his conviction, ruling there had been no evidence presented to attest to either trial misconduct or Sangret's innocence, adding they had further chosen to summarily dismiss the appeal due to "the abundance of evidence the appellant was the murderer of the girl", further stating there had been "no possible ground on which the verdict could be disturbed". Issues relating to the jury's recommendation to mercy were lodged with the Home Secretary, Herbert Morrison, who shortly thereafter upheld Sangret's death sentence.

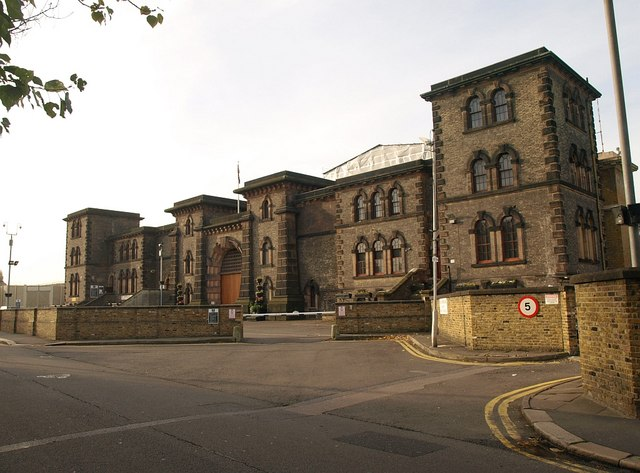
Wandsworth Prison. Sangret was executed within the grounds of this prison on 29 April 1943

== Execution ==
August Sangret was held in the condemned cell at Wandsworth Prison, to await execution. He was hanged by Albert Pierrepoint at 9 a.m. on 29 April 1943. The official cause of death upon Sangret's death certificate reads: "Injury to brain and spinal cord consequent upon judicial hanging."

Following his execution, Sangret was interred in an unmarked grave inside the grounds of Wandsworth Prison. Prior to his burial on the afternoon of 29 April, Dr. Keith Simpson performed an autopsy on Sangret's body, during which he found a tattoo on his arm bearing Joan Wolfe's name.

== Aftermath ==
- The Canadian Army authorities did not protest Sangret's conviction and sentencing, having passed the civil authority pertaining to cases involving their serving personnel charged with treason, murder, manslaughter, rape or treason-felony while stationed in the United Kingdom to the British courts shortly after Canada had joined the Second World War.
- Private August Sangret was posthumously inducted onto a 3 May 1943 list of Canadian servicemen who had died while serving overseas. Sangret's entry onto this list simply reads: "Royal Canadian Service Corps. – Sangret, August, Pte. L27572." Officially, his death is listed within the Regina Rifle Regiment as having occurred while "serving with other units".
- A plaque within the grounds of the Brookwood Military Cemetery commemorates Private August Sangret; he is one of 18 servicemen convicted of murder and executed by hanging who is commemorated upon this memorial. Sangret's entry can be found on Panel 23, Column 3. Each individual convicted of murder is commemorated within the Brookwood Military Cemetery due to the fact their respective regiments failed to dishonourably discharge the condemned person prior to their execution. Therefore, officially, each condemned man was executed while still a serving member of the armed forces.
- Although Joan Wolfe's lifestyle had been called into question at the trial, one prosecution witness defended her character and intentions: Superintendent Richard Webb of the Surrey CID, who had questioned Wolfe after she had been brought into custody on 23 August due to concerns for her welfare. Like others in authority before him, Webb had noted her as being "in need of protection" and, on the occasion he had seen her, had observed her as being "somewhat dirty". Webb testified to having repeatedly spoken with Wolfe in great detail; noting her soft-spoken and quiet manner. In defence of her character, Webb conceded that, although her lifestyle was somewhat immoral, she had been fiercely loyal to any one soldier at a time, in the hope he would marry her and provide her with the eventual security and stability she desired.
- In his memoirs, published in 1960, Inspector Edward Greeno confided his conducting the formal interview with Sangret at Godalming police station on 12 October had subsequently proven illegal, as Sangret had been held without charge for five days—four days longer than the law of habeas corpus allowed. Greeno confided he had been extremely concerned this issue may have been raised in court, adding that, prior to trial, he had been contacted by then-Assistant Commissioner Sir Norman Kendal on this very issue. However, for reasons unknown, neither Linton Thorp or his co-counsel, Laurence Vine, chose to raise this issue at Sangret's trial or subsequent appeal.
- Despite his conceding the case against Sangret may have been "flung out [of court] then and there" had Sangret's defence raised the issue of his breaching the law of habeas corpus, Greeno nonetheless reiterated his conviction of Sangret's guilt in what he recollected as being "nearly the perfect crime: a murder not only unsolved, but undiscovered." Greeno did, however, theorise as to Sangret's motive:
  I had interviewed thousands of people in this case, and seventy-four of them went into the witness-box. The case was so watertight that, as Sir Norman Kendal said later, Sangret's appeal against the death sentence was almost a farce. One small doubt remained: Sangret murdered the girl because she was expecting his child—but was she? Was she expecting anybody's child? The doctors didn't think so on the occasion that the police sent her to hospital, and when her body was found, it was too late to tell. But this is certain: Sangret did murder her. He confessed before he died ... It is never announced when a murderer confesses. But why not? There are always cranks and crackpots to argue that some wicked policeman has framed some poor fellow. So why make an official secret of the fact that the policeman did his job?

== Media ==
- The case of the Wigwam Murder has twice been dramatised by British radio scriptwriter and screenwriter Harry Alan Towers. Firstly as The Case of the Hunted Hunter in the radio crime drama series, Secrets of Scotland Yard.
- The second radio crime drama focusing upon the Wigwam Murder was broadcast in 1952 under the title of The Brass Button as part of the syndicated series The Black Museum.
- Discovery Channel (UK) have also broadcast an episode detailing the case of August Sangret as part of the series Crime Museum UK. This episode is entitled, Strange Weapons, and was first broadcast in 2014.
- The Crime Museum U.K. episode pertaining to the Wigwam Murder has also been broadcast via radio under the same title of Strange Weapons.
- Catching History's Criminals, a BBC forensics series, has also broadcast an episode featuring the case of August Sangret. This episode, entitled Instruments of Murder, was first broadcast on 2 July 2015.
- The sole book exclusively devoted to the case of August Sangret, M. J. Trow's The Wigwam Murder, calls into question the validity of Sangret's guilt. Trow argues Sangret had no motive to murder Wolfe, due to his impending overseas deployment.

== See also ==
- Brookwood Cemetery
- Capital punishment in the United Kingdom
- Habeas corpus – Court action challenging unlawful detention
- HM Prison Wandsworth
- List of executioners

== Cited works and further reading ==
- Bailey, Guy (1969). The Fatal Chance: Twelve Cases from the Notebook of a Crime Pathologist. London: P. Davies. ISBN 978-0-432-01090-7.
- Critchley, Macdonald, ed. (1995) [1959]. The Trial of August Sangret. Notable British Trials. William Hodge and Company. ISBN 978-1-561-69194-4.
- Gaute, J.H.H.; Odell, Robin (1996). The New Murderer's Who's Who. Harrap Books. ISBN 978-1-558-82093-7.
- Greeno, Edward (1960). War on the Underworld. John Long Ltd. ASIN B0000CKQQV.
- Gribble, Leonard R. (1966). Great Manhunters of the Yard. John Long Ltd. ASIN B0000CN89U.
- Innes, Brian (2000). Bodies of Evidence. Amber Books Ltd. ISBN 978-1-856-05623-6.
- Innes, Brian; Doncaster, Lucy (2024). Bodies of Evidence: How Forensic Science Solves Crimes. Amber Books Limited. ISBN 978-1-838-86550-4.
- Johnson, Paul (2022). The Brookwood Killers: Military Murderers of WWII. Frontline Books. ISBN 978-1-399-01182-2.
- Lefebure, Molly (2013). Murder on the Home Front: A True Story of Morgues, Murderers, and Mysteries in the Blitz. Sphere. ISBN 978-0-751-55204-1.
- Maxton, Caroline (2005). Foul Deeds and Suspicious Deaths in Guildford. Wharncliffe Books. ISBN 978-1-9034-2578-7.
- Nash, Jay (1992). World Encyclopedia of 20th Century Murder. Paragon Publishing. ISBN 978-1-5577-8506-0.
- Quigley, Christine (2006). Modern Mummies: The Preservation of the Human Body in the Twentieth Century. McFarland Publishing. ISBN 978-0-7864-2851-9.
- Ramsey, Winston (2012). Scenes Of Murder: Then And Now. Pen & Sword. ISBN 978-1-870-06775-1.
- Trow, Meirion James (1994). The Wigwam Murder. Constable. ISBN 978-0-09-472990-2.
- Trow, Meirion James (2008). War Crimes: Underworld Britain in the Second World War. Pen & Sword Books. ISBN 978-1-844-15278-0.
- Trow, Meirion James (2023). The Wigwam Murder: A Forensic Investigation in WW2 Britain. Pen & Sword Books. ISBN 978-1-399-04249-9.
- Wilson, Colin (2015). Written in Blood. Diversion Publishing. ISBN 978-1-626-81868-2.
- Wilson, Colin (1993). Murder in the 1940s. Caroll & Graf. ISBN 978-0-881-84962-2.
- Williams, Paul (1994). "Murder on Hankley Common". Real-life Crimes. Vol. 6, no. 88. Eaglemoss Publications Ltd. ISBN 978-1-858-75022-4.
- Wynn, Douglas (1996). On Trial for Murder. Pan Books. ISBN 978-0-09-472990-2.
