= Augusta Lenska =

American concert and opera singer (died 1988)

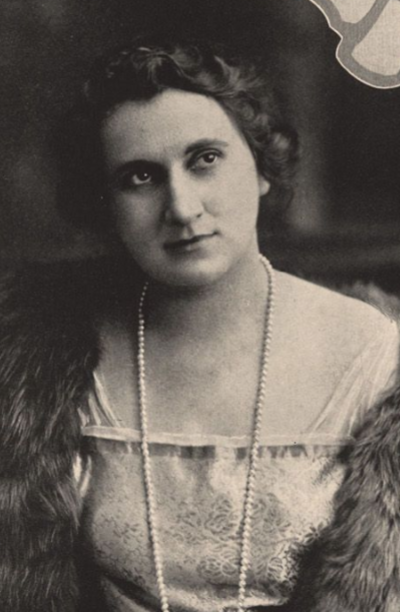
- Augusta Lenska, from a 1919 program
- Born: probably 1880s
- Other name: Madame Lenska
- Occupation: Singer

Augusta Lenska (probably born 1880s) was a Russian-born American concert and opera singer in the 1910s and 1920s, based in Chicago.

== Early life ==
In publicity and interviews, Lenska described herself as being born in Russia, raised in the Cape Colony, and educated in England and Belgium. Another version of her background described her as being born to Russian parents in England, or to Russian-British parents in South Africa, with training in Germany and Italy.

== Career ==
Lenska was singer, associated with La Monnaie opera house in Brussels, and with the Chicago Civic Opera Company. Her range was variously described as mezzo-soprano, alto, and contralto. "The singer has a voice of good quality, especially in its middle and lower registers," explained The New York Times in 1927, "and is also gifted with dramatic temperament, knowledge of style and ability to convey he mood and significance of a song to her audience."

Lenska's musical career flourished in middle America in the 1910s and 1920s. In 1916, she was a guest artist at a concert in Missouri and hosted a "soiree musicale" in Iowa. She gave recitals in Mississippi and Minnesota in 1918, and toured the Chautauqua circuit with the Culp String Quartet in 1919. In 1921 she gave a recital at the University of Oklahoma. She sang in Italy in 1923. She was a soloist in a 1925 production of La Gioconda and a 1926 production of Lohengrin, both with the Chicago Symphony Orchestra. She toured in the United States in 1926. In 1927, she sang the Azucena role in Il Trovatore in Chattanooga, Tennessee, and gave "a program of rare musical value" in Muncie, Indiana. She sang in Berlin in 1929.

== Later life ==
Along with others in the Chicago opera world, Lenska lost her life savings in 1929, buying worthless stock from investor Samuel Insull. Her career never recovered. In 1933, Lenska was injured when she was struck by a streetcar in Chicago; during a suspected suicide attempt. She was reported to be 51 years old at that time. She was an inmate of the Kankakee State Hospital by 1940, and still institutionalized there in 1950.
