= Ágúst Már Jónsson =

Icelandic footballer (born 1960)

Personal information
- Full name: Ágúst Már Jónsson
- Date of birth: 17 August 1960 (age 66)
- Place of birth: Iceland
- Position: Defender

Senior career*
Years	Team	Apps	(Gls)
1979–1988	KR	136	(13)
1989–1990	BK Häcken	15	(0)
1995	Afturelding	11	(0)

International career
1985	Iceland U21	2	(0)
1986–1989	Iceland	23	(0)
- * Club domestic league appearances and goals

Ágúst Már Jónsson (born 17 August 1960) is an Icelandic former footballer who played as a defender. He won 23 caps for the Iceland national football team between 1986 and 1989. In September 1989, he suffered a neck injury in a game against East Germany, effectively ending his career.

He later coached Afturelding men's and women's teams. He co-coached Knattspyrnufélag Reykjavíkur men's team in 2000.
