= Gustl Mollath =

German man (born 1956)

Gustl Ferdinand Mollath
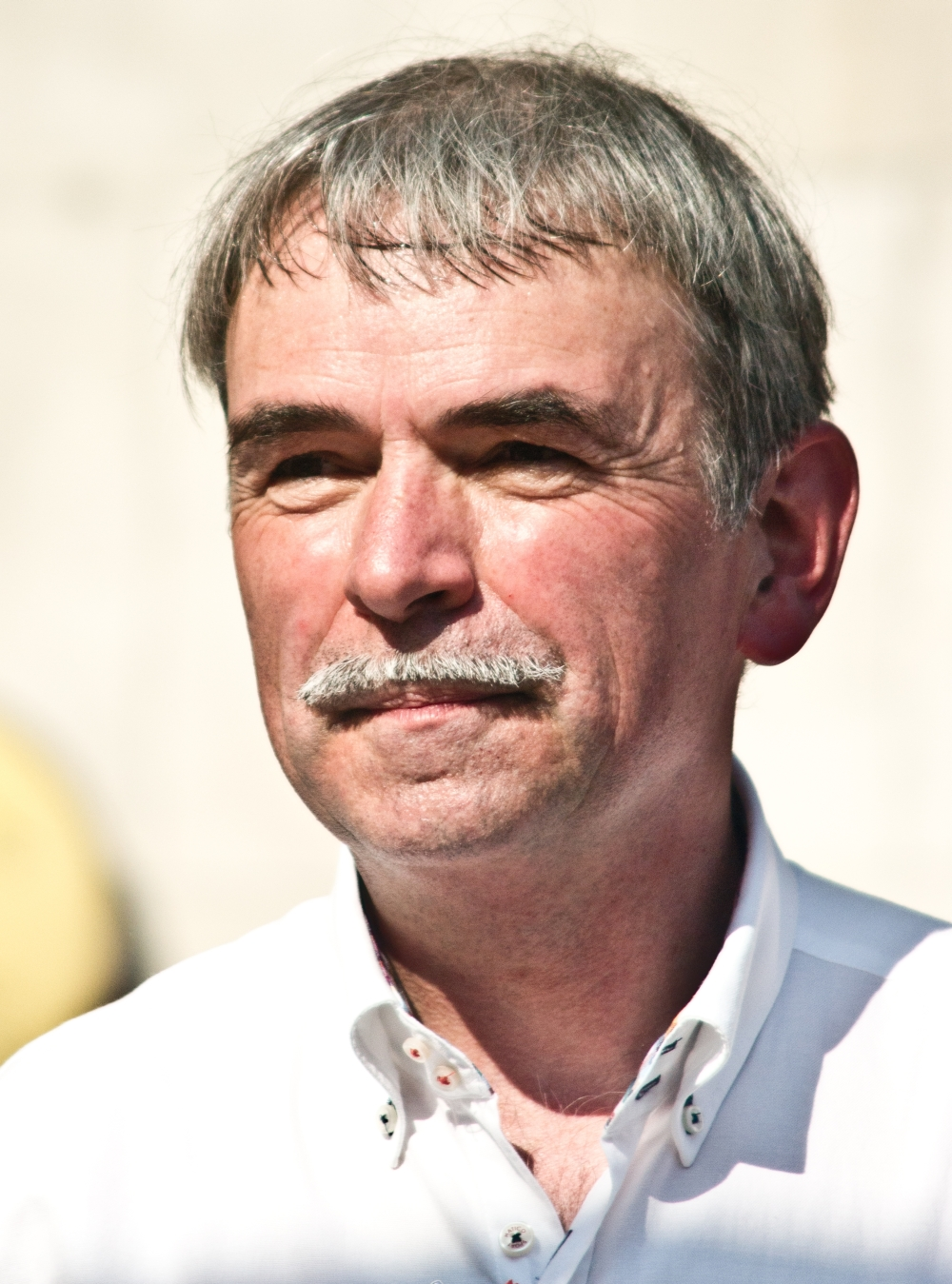
- Mollath in 2013
- Born: 7 November 1956 (age 70); Nuremberg, Bavaria, Germany

Gustl Ferdinand Mollath (born 7 November 1956) is a German man who was acquitted during a criminal trial in 2006 on the basis of diminished criminal responsibility. He was subsequently committed to a high-security psychiatric hospital, as the court deemed him a danger to the public and declared him insane based on expert diagnoses of paranoid personality disorder. The judgment became the basis of controversy when elements of his supposed delusions regarding money-laundering activities at a major bank were found to be true. Mollath had consistently claimed there was a conspiracy to have him locked up in a psychiatric care ward because of his incriminating knowledge; evidence discovered in 2012 made his claims appear plausible.

In 2006, after being accused of assaulting his former wife, Petra Mollath, Gustl Mollath was tried at the District Court of Nürnberg-Fürth for aggravated assault and wrongful deprivation of personal liberty of his ex-wife as well as damage to property. The court considered the charges proven but acquitted Mollath on the basis of finding him criminally insane. A pivotal argument for Mollath's insanity, besides the general impression he made, was that he insisted his wife was involved in a complex system of tax evasion. The court came to call it a paranoid belief system Mollath had developed, which led him to accuse many people of being part of a conspiracy and acting irrationally and aggressively, by puncturing car tires of people in a way that could lead to accidents.

In 2012, the case was widely publicized when evidence brought to the attention of state prosecutors showed that suspicious activities were carried out over several years by members of staff (including Mollath's ex-wife) at the Munich-based HypoVereinsbank, as detailed in an internal audit report carried out by the bank in 2003. The reported money transfers were not illegal per se.

In June 2013, Mollath's former wife spoke for the first time to the press. According to her, Gustl Mollath was continually violent towards her, prior and during marriage. The alleged money laundering activities became an issue only after their divorce, which directly contradicts Gustl Mollath's version that he had suffered from the illegal activities of his former wife. Gustl Mollath has denied the allegations levied against him and has said that he was being persecuted for blowing the whistle on tax evasion at HypoVereinsbank.

On 6 August 2013, the Higher Regional Court of Nuremberg ordered a retrial and Mollath's immediate release, overturning a verdict of the Regional Court of Regensburg that had blocked a retrial.

Mollath's 2018 action for damages by the unlawful custody has been concluded in November 2019 by an ex gratia payment of €600,000 by the defendant Free State of Bavaria.

== Early life ==
Gustl Mollath was born 7 November 1956 in Nuremberg. He attended a Waldorf school and obtained an entrance qualification for universities of applied sciences in 1976. He then began to study mechanical engineering, which he subsequently abandoned. Mollath lost his father in 1960 and his mother in 1980, both due to cancer. In 1981 he worked for about two years as a controller at MAN and then founded the automotive Augusto M. workshop, specializing in tyres, vehicle tuning and vintage car restoration.

In 1978 he met his future wife Petra Mollath, who worked from 1990 as a financial adviser at HypoVereinsbank. They married in 1991.

== Court case and detainment ==
According to Petra Mollath, a violent confrontation and assault happened in August 2001 in their apartment. In 2002, she moved out.

In September 2003 Petra Mollath turned to Gabriele Krach, a psychiatrist at "Klinikum am Europakanal", Erlangen, who issued a medical opinion, sourced from her representations, that Gustl Mollath was most likely suffering from a serious psychiatric illness.

Petra Mollath transferred this document on 23 September to the District Court of Straubing by fax, whereupon it was used in allegations of aggravated assault, leading to criminal proceedings against Mollath before the District Court of Nuremberg. Mollath twice dismissed proposed assessment dates for his mental state in 2003, first in mid-2004 and again in early 2005. He was therefore admitted by the court to a psychiatric hospital for a psychological assessment. Gustl and Petra Mollath divorced in 2004, and late in 2005 he was charged with assault and accused of damaging car tires (in such a way that they might have caused severe accidents) of various people involved in the case.

From February 2006, Mollath was deemed to be a public danger and was held in three different institutions including, from April 2006, the Straubing District Hospital.

The District Court Nuernberg-Fuerth eventually acquitted Mollath in August 2006, because of his attested state of mind, yet considered the accusation proven. The court ordered his hospitalization in a psychiatric hospital because he was considered dangerous. The judgment was based, among other things, on the opinion of expert Klaus Leipziger from Bayreuth, who attested to Mollath's paranoid delusions of a "black money complex".

Since mid-2009, Mollath was hospitalized in the District Hospital of Bayreuth.

== Political and media discussion ==
Numerous media outlets, in particular the Süddeutsche Zeitung (major German newspaper) and Report Mainz (investigative TV magazine), reported critically for years about the Mollath case, for example about the trial management. They complain about mistakes in the court hearings and the selective consideration of evidence. For their series of articles in the Süddeutsche Zeitung about the Mollath case, Olaf Przybilla and Uwe Ritzer were awarded with the 3rd prize of the Guardian Prize of the German daily press (Wächterpreis der deutschen Tagespresse)

=== First report from Report Mainz ===
The case was first presented on TV by Report Mainz on 13 December 2011. Mollath's former wife was employed by the HypoVereinsbank and Gustl Mollath accused her and other employees of facilitating customers tax evasion. The HypoVereinsbank then performed an internal investigation and subsequently terminated her employment in 2003, along with other employees.

In light of these findings, court juror Mr. Westenrieder criticized the trial procedures. He assumed that the money laundering allegations by Mollath were inaccurate. The presiding judge interrupted and threatened Mollath with throwing him out of court, if he would ever mention the issue of tax evasion and black money transfers again.

The report also criticized that the court didn't consider documents and handwritten notes about accounts in Switzerland, as well as the comprehensive 106 pages Mollath presented during the trial procedures.

The report also accused the state prosecutor that they had detailed information from Mollath's complaint against his ex-wife of 11 June 2003 to pursue and check if there were tax evasion transfers going on. The Nuremberg state prosecutors dismissed these complaints as "too general." The state prosecutors stated to the magazine in writing that there is no reason for an investigation.

=== Urgency motion in the Bavarian Parliament ===
After an urgency motion of the Bavarian SPD party in the Bavarian Parliament, the Minister of Justice Beate Merk (CSU party) defended herself in a speech in front of the Parliament on 15 December 2011 against the impression Mollath had been hospitalized due to his criminal complaint. The following day she was explaining through a spokesman, that the accommodation Mollaths in psychiatry was a consequence of his crimes and had nothing to do with his wife or his lawsuit against the bank. She said, Mollath harmed his wife with strangulation marks on the neck, large hematoma and a bleeding bite wound. He also stabbed dozens of car tires, including those on vehicles of the wife's lawyers. His accommodation was confirmed by the Federal court and is observed regularly. She defended herself against the allegations that the state prosecution had failed to act because of instructions from leading politicians. Thereupon, the state prosecutor himself directed some questions towards the HypoVereinsbank.

=== Second and third report from Report Mainz ===
The case reached the general public after 13 November 2012, when the Süddeutsche Zeitung and Report Mainz again dealt with the Mollath case. Report Mainz had acquired the 2003 audit report of the bank, which made it public in the TV magazine series. According to the results of the investigation, Mollath's allegations were indeed in some areas diffuse, but his wife had actually communicated customers against commissions to a bank in Switzerland and also transferred funds there. They also found allegations to be true, that employees violated the tax code and the Securities Trading Act as well as hints to tax evasion aid. A "well-known personality" has been helped to launder black money.

Report Mainz confronted Minister Merk in an interview with a quote from the audit report, which states that "all verifiable allegations were proven to be true". The magazine put that statement in contrast to her testimony before the Parliament Committee on Legal Affairs on 30 October 2012, where she said Mollath's allegations weren't true. Minister Merk thereupon declared in the interview that no pursuable statements had been proved to be true. The next day she explained in more detail, that the relevant audit report allegations had affected employment law issues and were not pursuable. As far as criminal matters were concerned, the statutes of limitations had already occurred. It was not a question of whether Mollath is telling the truth, but whether he is dangerous or not.

Tax investigator Frank Wehrheim accused Minister Merk, that her statement was a "deliberate false statement". Süddeutsche Zeitung, which was reporting on the case at the same time as Report Mainz, also said that the financial authorities had started investigations after learning of the existence of the audit report.

On 4 December 2012 Report Mainz broached the issue for a third time, this time particularly with regards to the allegation of Judge Brixner's bias in the case. He arranged a call at the tax authorities, that Mollath's allegations were not being pursued.

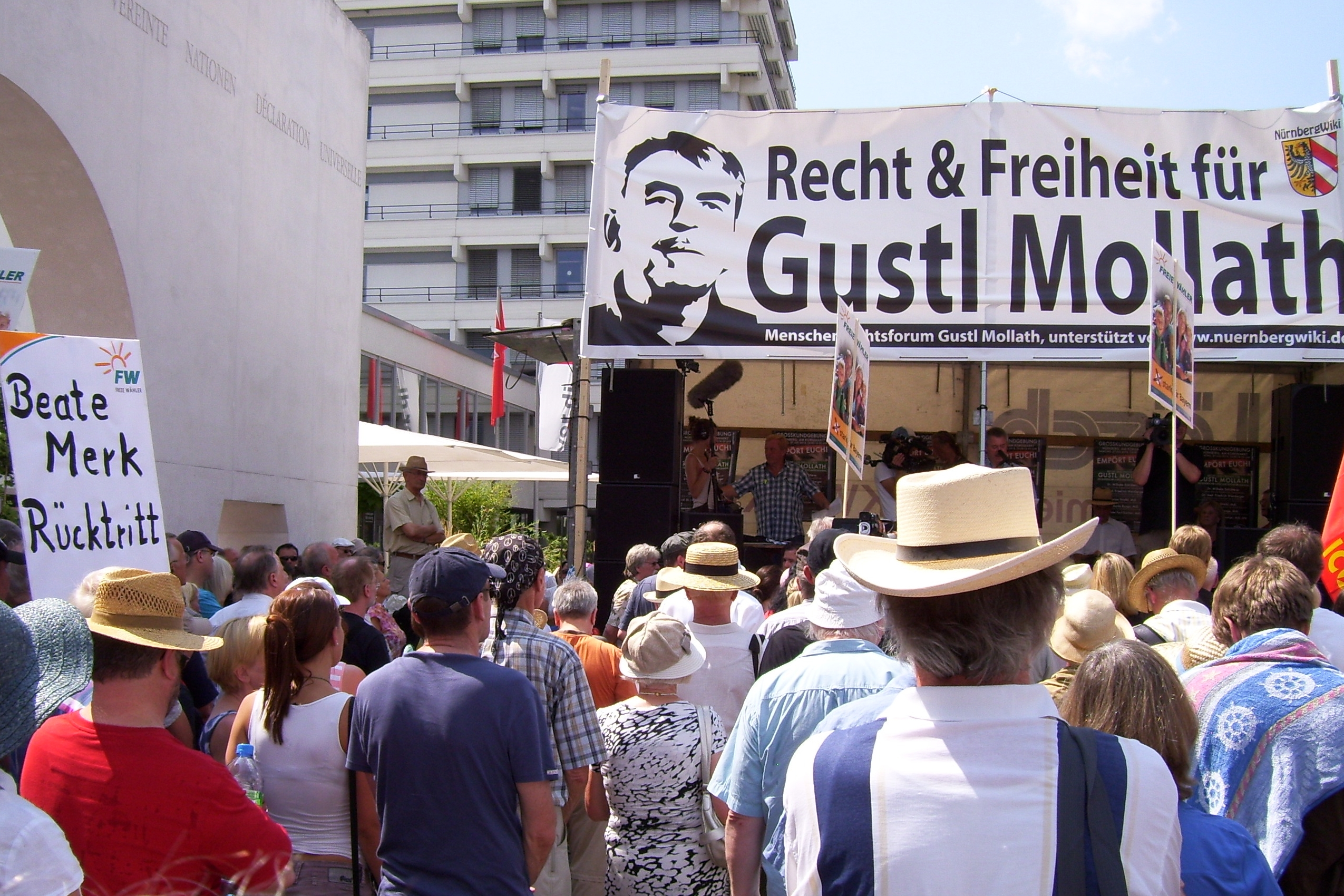
27 July 2013, in Nuremberg

=== Public reactions ===
The second report evoked a number of public reactions. The opposition in the Bavarian parliament demanded that Merk resign her office. The bank defended itself against accusations that it did not self-report its breaches of the law, saying periodic audits did not "reveal sufficient information on criminally relevant behaviour of clients or employees that would have made a criminal complaint seem appropriate". According to the bank, no proof of criminal behaviour had been found and the conclusions of the audit had been too vague for any such endeavour. German newspaper Süddeutsche Zeitung raised objections, calling the bank's statement a "grotesquely trivialising portrayal".

Subsequently, psychiatric assessments of Mollath's mental health, carried out as part of the court proceedings and ongoing investigation, became an issue as well. Juryman Westenrieder said he had already considered the psychiatric assessment "weak" during Mollath's trial, as it had been created, for the most part, from documents alone, i.e. without an analysis of Mollath in person, and because no second assessment had been made. Friedrich Weinberger, retired psychiatrist and chairman of Walter-von-Baeyer-Gesellschaft für Ethik in der Psychiatrie (GEP - Walter von Baeyer Society for Ethics in Psychiatry), who had visited Mollath in Bayreuth in April 2011, Maria E. Fick, Commissioner for Human Rights of the Bavarian State Chamber of Physicians, professor of penal law Henning Ernst Müller (University of Regensburg) as well as the Süddeutsche Zeitung criticised the medical assessment's quality and the verdict's viability.

The first medical specialist statement on Mollath's mental health was created solely from information provided by his wife; the doctor in question, Gabriele Krach, consultant psychiatrist at the Klinikum am Europakanal, had not seen Mollath even once. The first consultant, Michael Wörthmüller, had declared himself partial and recommended Klaus Leipziger instead. Leipziger created a first medical assessment in 2005, based on court documents sent to him, which diagnosed a "paranoid system of thought". In contrast, Hans Simmerl, the consultant commissioned by the local court of Straubing to assess Mollath's mental health during a trial pertaining to his guardianship/health care, conversed with him for several hours in 2007 and did not find any evidence of mental disorders; he ruled out schizophrenic delusions and recommended an end to Mollath's psychiatric care. A 2008 assessment by Hans-Ludwig Kröber, however, agreed with the findings of Krach and Leipziger, again without examining Mollath in person. It was a direct reaction to Simmerl's statement, initiated by the responsible "court for the execution of prison sentences" (Strafvollstreckungskammer). Another assessment done by Friedemann Pfäfflin in 2010 reaffirmed Leipziger's diagnosis of a "system of delusions" (regarding allegations of black money), but denied his claim that Mollath constituted a danger to the general public, thus negating the condition for his stay in a closed institution.

The Süddeutsche Zeitung also criticised the court proceedings, claiming that exculpatory evidence was ignored for the most part. In addition, Mollath did not trust his court-appointed lawyer, who found himself nearly incapable of helping his client as a result. Like Müller, the newspaper furthermore contradicted Merk's claim that Mollath's classification as a danger to the public and his black money allegations had nothing to do with each other. According to the publication, the assumption of a "black money complex/obsession" was crucial to all verdicts pertaining to Mollath's institutionalisation, beginning in 2006 with the regional court in Nürnberg and influencing even verdicts as late as 2011 and beyond.

Due to said coverage, Merk was under public and political pressure and on 30 November 2012 vowed to have Mollath's case re-opened.

=== Defending the lawsuit ===
In December 2012 Beate Lakotta, journalist for the German weekly magazine Der Spiegel covered the lawsuit and stated that there were plausible explanations for most of the claims laid out by Mollath and his defenders. Contrary to the argument by German daily newspaper Süddeutsche Zeitung, the medical certificate had not been the result of a conspiracy between a friend of Mollath's former wife, who worked as a receptionist in the issuing doctor's office but had been issued by the son of the owner, himself a medical practitioner. It had only been issued after the charges had already been pressed, but was based on entries in Mollath's medical record from 2011. Lakotta stated that proof for the claim that Mollath's former wife was involved in money laundering and a tax evasion scheme did not exist, as having assets abroad was not a crime. A labor court had overturned the extraordinary termination of her work contract.

Regarding the quote „Alle nachprüfbaren Behauptungen haben sich als zutreffend herausgestellt" ("Every verifiable claim has turned out true"), one would have to ask what had been verifiable at all. This contains mainly the money transfer operations, which by themselves were not criminally liable. Mollath had answered any of the bank's demands asking for specific leads with the words "Ich mache doch nicht ihre Revisionsarbeit" ("I won't do your audits"). The psychiatric examinators had not based their diagnosis on the money laundry claims, but on the "confused content" of the letters sent by Mollath. Mollath had linked his wife's actions to the defense industry and Rotarian. He was said to have pierced car tires in such a way that drivers would only notice this while driving, narrowly escaping accidents or injury. His involvement in these actions was proven by one of his letters addressed to one of his victims which stated the names of the other victims, accusing them of being part of the tax evasion scheme.

The medical expert Leipziger defended his report against claims that it did not withstand the inquest of the audit report. According to him, in the case of delusional disorders there were often underlying truths.

=== Debate on the judicial panel ===
On 28 February and 7 March 2013 the judicial panel of the Bavarian parliament debated the causa Mollath. This particularly emphasised the question whether judge Otto Brixner had influenced tax fraud investigations. Roland Jüptner, president of the Bavarian state office for taxes (Bayerisches Landesamt für Steuern), denied this. During the first session, he based this opinion on the fact that if this actually was the case, there would be a remark in the files. German newspaper "Süddeutsche Zeitung" subsequently reported that such a remark in fact existed.

A statement by Beate Merk in front of the Bavarian parliament in March 2012 posed a similar situation, stating that the "Duraplus file" was an "abstruse conglomeration". It was said to have led, together with the audit report and account movements in Swiss number accounts, to the initiation of several tax crime investigations in December 2012. While at first Jüptner claimed that only a handwritten note - in itself not constituting a "note for the file" - existed. The parliamentary opposition pointed out that Jüptner himself had written about a "handwritten note for the file". During a session on 7 March, Jüptner apologised and stated that fiscal secrecy regulations had forbidden him from releasing the note, while still assuring that the closing of the proceedings would also have occurred without the phone conversation with Brixner. The parliamentary opposition remained unconvinced.

Another argument during the 7 March session regarded comments by Nuremberg state attorneys, who, according to the German newspaper "Die Zeit", had stated during phone conversations that the court ruling was the result of a certain "sloppiness". Regardless of such apparent careless mistakes the ruling was said to be "essentially correct". Releasing Mollath as a result of political pressure was said to correspond to a catastrophe for the community, because he was still regarded as a dangerous person. Parliamentary opposition demanded to withdraw the case from the Office of the Chief Public Prosecutor Nuremberg due to bias. This demand was also based on the fact that the chief public prosecutor Hasso Nerlich had also been responsible for two failed petitions by Mollath in 2004, but the Bavarian ministry for justice and the parliament refused, in part to secure the separation of legislative and judiciary. On 4 January 2013, Mollath's attorney Strate filed charges against the judge and psychiatrist who performed the interning, for wrongful deprivation of personal liberty, but these charges were dismissed in February.

== Further events since February 2013 ==
On 19 February 2013, Strate applied for a trial de novo based on evidence that the presiding judge had committed numerous instances of perversion of justice against Mollath in the case. According to Strate, the judge was responsible for Mollath's detention for almost three weeks without disclosure of the charges or presentation to a judge, failure to respond to Mollath's complaints or forward them to the higher court that should have decided them, manipulation of the court's composition, obvious misrepresentations in the reasons for the judgment, and unconscionable refusal to discharge Mollath's assigned counsel in spite of many petitions to do so, followed by use of said counsel as a witness against his own client. To prevent duplication of effort with the prosecution, which was preparing a similar application of its own, the application was based exclusively on material that was, or should have been, available to the original court at the time of the original verdict. The application was debated in the legal committee of the Bavarian Parliament.

On 18 March 2013, in a very unusual move, the prosecution also applied for a trial de novo, based on exculpating evidence that had surfaced only after the original trial.

In April 2013 a parliamentary inquiry commission was established by the Landtag of Bavaria following a motion by Alliance '90/The Greens and the Free Voters, joined by the Social Democratic Party. Judge Otto Brixner had to admit before the committee that he hadn't read Mollath's written defense which he claimed to be irrelevant in his judgment. In June 2013 Mollath testified before the committee, repeating his claim that he wasn't allowed to give evidence during his trial.

=== Twitter incident ===
Ursula Gresser, a member of the CSU party and professor for internal medicine working at LMU Munich was visited by two plainclothes police officers at noon 10 June 2013 for a Twitter message that instigated to ask the Bavarian Minister of Justice for Mollath's release during a public event on online safety with minister. According to Gresser, the police told her that there were concerns over the safety of an event with the Minister of Justice in connection with a Twitter tweet. She previously had written: "When will Mollath come free? You can ask Merk this question on Monday, 10 June 2013, 19 o'clock at the Landgasthof Hofolding (Hofolding Country Inn)". She felt that the visit of the police was an attempt to intimidate and discourage her from visiting the event. Later, the Ministry of Justice and the police denied this. They claimed to receive note over earlier tweets about Gresser's family disputes and a related, planned disruption of the event.

=== Release ===
On 6 August 2013, the Oberlandesgericht Nuremberg (higher regional court) ordered the reopening of Mollath's case. He was released from mental hospital immediately. The court found that the medical certificate documenting the alleged abuse of his wife was a "fictitious document", because it appeared to be written and signed by Dr. Madeleine Reichel, who never had examined Mollath's wife. Instead the author of the report was her son, then a doctor in training.

=== Action for damages ===
Mollath's 2018 action for damages by the unlawful custody has been concluded in November 2019 by an ex gratia payment of €600,000 by the defendant Free State of Bavaria.

== Retrial ==
In the retrial that began on 7 July 2014, Mollath's ex-wife refused to testify. Judge Otto Brixner admitted errors in his 2006 verdict, but claimed he could not remember the details of the case and had destroyed his personal notes following his retirement.

A witness who had previously claimed in a TV interview that Mollath's wife had actually told him prior to the first court case that she would arrange, through her connections, for her husband to end up in a psychiatric hospital retracted his statements, stating they might not be correct after all and calling them "script" and "a bit of folklore".

Mollath's former lawyer testified that he had been threatened by Mollath. Another witness testified that Petra Mollath had complained about domestic violence before and that Gustl Mollath had attacked her (the witness) at one point when Petra Mollath had sought refuge with her.

Gustl Mollath had a falling-out with his lawyers during the trial. The court subsequently appointed them as duty solicitors and refused Strate's request to release him from this duty. Against his lawyers' wishes and without support from them, Gustl Mollath repeated his lengthy statements about a tax evasion conspiracy that reached high up into politics, but the court refused to hear his numerous criminal complaints.

Ultimately, the court considered the aggravated assault proven, but fully acquitted him on the other charges citing insufficient proof. Criminal insanity was also considered unproven; Mollath was held in a psychiatric ward unlawfully and was entitled to a compensation. The acquittal from the first trial could not be overturned though, and Mollath was acquitted on all charges.

Mollath attempted to appeal the ruling as the court did consider him guilty of assault (yet had to acquit him on legal grounds), but his appeal was rejected because the reasons for an acquittal technically cannot be grounds for an appeal.
