= August Vaga =

Estonian botanist (1893–1960)

August Vaga (15 March 1893 in Kehra – 11 December 1960 in Tartu) was an Estonian botanist. Much of his research into botany was conducted in Tartu, and he was affiliated with the Estonian Institute of Zoology and Botany from its founding in 1947 to 1952.
