= Ágúst Pálsson =

Icelandic architect (1893–1967)

Ágúst Pálsson (3 October 1893 – 25 November 1967) was an Icelandic architect.

His notable works include Neskirkja (built 1952–1957), which is often considered the first modern church in Iceland. His design caused controversy. Jónas Jónsson frá Hriflu, one of Iceland's most influential political figures, used the design of the church as a key example as to why modern architecture had no place in Iceland, and why the more traditional and Icelandic nationalist style of Guðjón Samúelsson was superior. The Neskirkja Planning Committee sought out the view of renowned Finnish architect Eliel Saarinen to assess the architectural style of the building; Saarinen praised the design. In 1997, several architects and experts on architecture placed Neskirkja on their list of the ten most beautiful buildings in Iceland.

Pálsson designed Gljúfrasteinn, the home of Halldór Kiljan Laxness, who was awarded the Nobel Prize in Literature in 1955. The building is rare for being in the functionalist style while also being situated out in nature.

Pálsson also designed two lighthouses, both built in 1946: Stokksnesviti just east of the town of Höfn in south-east Iceland and Malarrifsviti south of the glacier Snæfellsjökull in the west of Iceland.
