= Joe August =

American singer

Background information
- Also known as: Mr. Google Eyes; Mr. G
- Born: Joseph Charles Augustus; September 13, 1931; New Orleans, Louisiana, United States
- Died: August 9, 1992 (aged 60) New Orleans, Louisiana, U.S.
- Genres: R&B, Louisiana blues
- Occupations: Singer, songwriter
- Instrument: Vocals
- Years active: 1945–1992

Joe August (September 13, 1931 – August 9, 1992) was an American blues and R&B singer and songwriter who performed and recorded as "Mr. Google Eyes" or sometimes "Mr. G".

== Biography ==
Joseph Charles Augustus was born in New Orleans, Louisiana. His family moved to the newly opened Iberville Projects in 1940. August recalled, "My grandmother got me singing in the choir of the First Emmanuel Baptist Church. That's where I got my bottom from." His mother and grandmother were against him getting into music, especially the blues. "My family was dearest against it. My grandmother said I'd be working for the devil, so they wouldn't buy me an instrument. I wanted a set of drums too. Everybody in the neighborhood had a horn or a saxophone. The next best thing I had was my voice, so that was my instrument."

His father, Joe August Sr. wrote a regular local music column called "Here It Is" that was published in the Louisiana Weekly from May 1941 to March 1943. The column also included sports and social news and occasional political commentary relating to New Orleans' African-American community. Alphonse J. "Joe" August Sr. was 87 when he died in New Orleans March 29, 1987.

As a teenager August worked for local restaurateur Dooky Chase, who gave him the nickname "Mr. Google Eyes" for his habit of ogling attractive female customers. Chase also sponsored a local jazz band, with whom August would occasionally sing. After earning enough money to buy his own PA system, he began performing regularly at the local Downbeat Club, appearing with Roy Brown. "At that time very few bands had PA sets. See, some of the younger guys who started bands didn't have 'em, so they would come to me. That put me in demand - they sure couldn't have the PA unless I sang." He made his recording debut in 1946 for the Coleman record label, with the song "Poppa Stoppa's Be-Bop Blues", on which he was credited as "Mr. Google Eyes – the world's youngest blues singer". The song became a local hit, and he followed it up with another hit, "Rock My Soul". He recorded four discs for Coleman, a black-owned record company, with Lee Allen and Paul Gayten backing him.

In 1948, his contract was bought by Columbia Records, and he released the single "For You My Love", followed by several others on the label. Although none of his records became national hits, he toured with Al Hibbler and appeared at the Birdland jazz club in New York City on bills headlined by Dizzy Gillespie and Charlie Parker. Count Basie's wife heard August sing at the club. "Three days later I went into the studio with Count Basie for RCA Records." There he recorded "If You See My Baby" with Basie's sextet. He married and settled in Newark, New Jersey in 1951. There, he met Johnny Otis, who was working in A&R for the Duke and Peacock record labels, and signed for the Duke label. He also wrote the song "Please Forgive Me", a hit for Johnny Ace with the Johnny Otis Orchestra in 1954. August released several records for Duke, but none were successful, and in 1955 he moved with Otis to Los Angeles. He performed in clubs there, and continued to record for small local labels.

He returned to New Orleans in 1960, and worked as a nightclub MC on Bourbon Street. After his marriage broke up, he began dating a white woman. The pair were harassed by the police and, when he tried to end the relationship, his girlfriend shot him in the abdomen. Though he recovered, he was charged under miscegenation laws, and the incident had a detrimental effect on his career. Thereafter August worked as a bartender and MC in New Orleans, performing occasionally with Earl King and Deacon John Moore in the New Orleans Blues Revue. August's last known recording was cut with Allen Toussaint for Instant Records in 1965. "Everything Happens At Night" was unreleased at the time, and eventually came out on a 2012 compilation of New Orleans R&B Mr Joe's Jambalaya & Loaded Down With the Blues from Charly Records. In the mid-1980s, Swedish R&B aficionado Jonas Bernholm contacted August after meeting him on a trip to New Orleans. With his permission, Bernholm arranged to re-release seventeen of August's recordings from 1949 until 1954 on the Swedish label Route 66, a division of Mr R&B Records. Bernholm made certain to pay royalties to August and other R&B artists whose music he reissued. In letter to Bernholm dated November 11, 1986, August wrote of his performing prowess. "I have been blessed and in good health. I'm able to perform two good hours without a break and hold the people in the palm of my hand."

He died in New Orleans in 1992, aged 60. At his jazz funeral, Mac Rebennack (Dr. John) said: "It is with great pride that we carry the message of the blues that you instilled in us as children."
