= Ágúst Ögmundsson =

Icelandic handball player (born 1946)

Personal information
- Nationality: Icelandic
- Born: 23 April 1946 (age 80)

Sport
- Sport: Handball
- Current club: Retired
National team
Years	Team	Apps	(Gls)
–	Iceland	25	(15)

Ágúst Ögmundsson (born 23 April 1946) is an Icelandic former handball player who competed in the 1972 Summer Olympics.
