= Ágúst Hauksson =

Icelandic footballer (born 1960)

Personal information
- Full name: Ágúst Friðrik Hauksson
- Date of birth: 11 September 1960 (age 66)
- Place of birth: Iceland
- Position: Defender

Senior career*
Years	Team	Apps	(Gls)
1977–1980	Þróttur Reykjavík	49	(4)
1981	Fram	18	(0)
1982	Þróttur Reykjavík	?	(?)
1983–1984	Kopervik	?	(?)
1985–1986	Vard Haugesund	?	(?)
1987–1988	Trio	?	(?)
1989–1990	Rosendal	?	(?)
1991	Trio	?	(?)
1992–1996	Þróttur Reykjavík	64	(1)
1997	Averøykameratene	?	(?)
1998–2000	Stord	?	(?)
2003	Trio	?	(?)

International career
1976	Iceland U17	8	(0)
1977	Iceland U19	7	(0)
1980	Iceland U21	1	(0)
1980	Iceland	1	(0)
- * Club domestic league appearances and goals

Ágúst Friðrik Hauksson (born 11 September 1960) is an Icelandic former footballer who played as a defender. He won one cap for the Iceland national football team. Ágúst made his only appearance for his country in the 4–1 win against Greenland, coming on as a substitute for Trausti Haraldsson.
