= Carl August =

Carl August may refer to:

- Carl August, Crown Prince of Sweden (1768 – 1810), Danish nobleman
- Carl August, Grand Duke of Saxe-Weimar-Eisenach (1757 – 1828)
- Charles Augustus, Hereditary Grand Duke of Saxe-Weimar-Eisenach (1912–1988)
