= Agus Suhendra =

Indonesian footballer

Personal information
- Full name: Agus Suhendra
- Date of birth: 17 August 1988 (age 38)
- Place of birth: Aceh Selatan, Indonesia
- Height: 1.65 m (5 ft 5 in)
- Position: Full-back

Team information
- Current team: Persiraja Banda Aceh
- Number: 17

Senior career*
Years	Team	Apps	(Gls)
2008–2013	Persal Aceh Selatan	29	(0)
2014–2021	Persiraja Banda Aceh	79	(2)
2023–	Persiraja Banda Aceh	28	(0)
- * Club domestic league appearances and goals as of 11 January 2025

Agus Suhendra (born August 17, 1988) is an Indonesian professional footballer who plays as a full-back for Liga 2 club Persiraja Banda Aceh.

== Club career ==
=== Persal ===
He started his career in 2008 at a semi-professional club, Persal, to compete mainly in the third-tier league in Indonesia. He spent playing there until 2013.

=== Persiraja ===
In 2014, he was scouted during an unofficial match by Persiraja and got an offer to join the club. However, he spent the first year mostly for their reserve team. In 2015, Indonesia competition was suspended. He broke into main squad when Persiraja competed in 2016 ISC B. He continued to become an integral part of Persiraja team for the following Liga 2 season 2017 and also in 2018. In 2019, he even helped Persiraja to secure a promotion to Liga 1. Persiraja extended his contract in 2020 to join the team competing in 2020 Liga 1. On February 29, 2020, he played his first Liga 1 game as a starting line-up when Persiraja played their first league game in 2020 season against Bhayangkara.

== Club statistics ==
As of match played 11 January 2025

Club	Season	League			National Cup (Note: Includes Piala Indonesia.)		Continental		Total	
Club	Season	Division	Apps	Goals	Apps	Goals	Apps	Goals	Apps	Goals
Persiraja	2016	ISC B	18	0	0	0	0	0	18	0
Persiraja	2017	Liga 2	13	1	0	0	0	0	13	1
Persiraja	2018	Liga 2	26	1	1	0	0	0	27	1
Persiraja	2019	Liga 2	21	0	0	0	0	0	21	0
Persiraja	2020	Liga 1	1	0	0	0	0	0	1	0
Persiraja	2021	Liga 1	0	0	0	0	0	0	0	0
Persiraja	2023–24	Liga 2	20	0	0	0	0	0	20	0
Persiraja	2024–25	Liga 2	8	0	0	0	0	0	8	0
Total			107	2	1	0	0	0	108	2

== Honours ==
=== Club ===
Persiraja Banda Aceh

- Liga 2 third place (play-offs): 2019
