= Karl August Görner =

German actor and director (1806–1884)

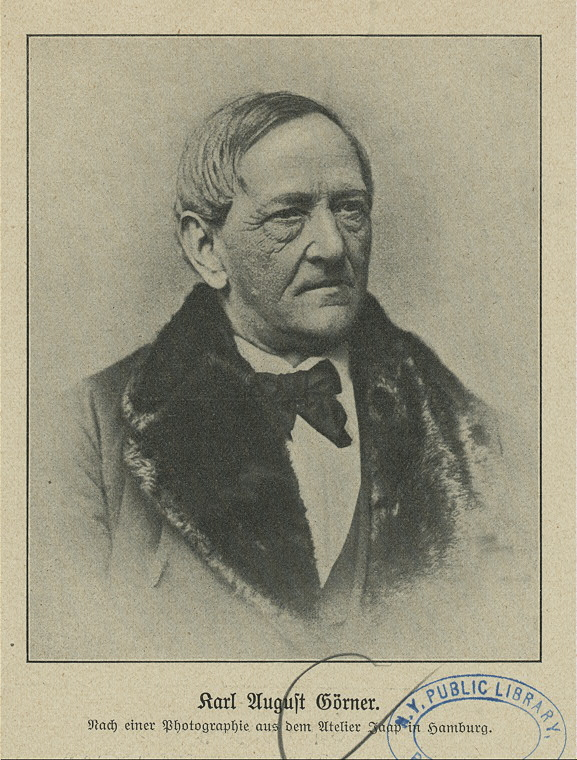
Karl August Görner

Karl August Görner (29 January 1806 – 9 April 1884) was a German actor, director and playwright.

== Biography ==
Karl was born on 29 January 1806 in Berlin.
