= Auguste =

Auguste may refer to:

== People ==
=== Surname ===
- Ackeem Auguste (born 2003), Saint Lucia and West Indies cricketer
- Arsène Auguste (1951–1993), Haitian footballer
- Donna Auguste (born 1958), African-American businesswoman
- Georges Auguste (born 1933), Haitian painter
- Henri Auguste (1759–1816), Parisian gold and silversmith
- Joyce Auguste, Saint Lucian musician
- Jules Robert Auguste (1789–1850), French painter
- Tancrède Auguste (1856–1913), President of Haiti (1912–13)

=== Given name ===
- Auguste, Baron Lambermont (1819–1905), Belgian statesman
- Auguste, Duke of Leuchtenberg (1810–1835), prince consort of Maria II of Portugal
- Auguste, comte de La Ferronays (1777–1842), French Minister of Foreign Affairs
- Auguste Baillayre (1879–1961), French-born Romanian painter
- Auguste Capelier (1905–1977), French art director
- Auguste Clot (1858–1936), French art printer
- Auguste Comte (1798–1857), French philosopher
- Auguste de Marmont (1774-1852), Marshal of the Empire
- Auguste Dick (1910–1993), Austrian historian of mathematics
- Georges Auguste Escoffier (1846–1935), French chef, restaurateur and culinary writer
- Auguste Groß von Trockau (1845-1915), German writer
- Auguste Charles Philippe Robert Landry (1946–1919), Canadian politician, Speaker of the Senate of Canada
- Auguste Lechner (1905-2000), Austrian writer
- Auguste Mboe (1934–2013), Central African diplomat and politician
- Auguste Metz (1812–1854), Luxembourgish entrepreneur
- Auguste Léopold Protet (1808–1862), French Navy admiral
- Auguste Piccard (1884–1962), Swiss physicist, inventor, and explorer
- Auguste Rodin (1840–1917), French sculptor
- Auguste Schepp (1846-1905), German painter
- Auguste Tessier (1853–1938), Quebec lawyer and political figure
- Auguste Villiers de l'Isle-Adam (1838–1889), French symbolist writer
- Auguste von Müller (1849–1912), German operatic mezzo-soprano and actress
- Duchess Auguste of Württemberg (1734–1787), wife of Karl Anselm, Prince of Thurn and Taxis
- Catherine the Great birth name was Princess Sophie Friederike Auguste

== Fiction ==
- Auguste (film), a 1961 French comedy film directed by Pierre Chevalier
- Auguste, the deceased Crown Prince of Vere in the Captive Prince novels by C. S. Pacat
- Auguste, a knight in the fantasy manga series Majo no Shinzō
- Auguste Beau, the antagonist of the manga series Kaze to Ki no Uta
- Auguste de Montesse, the father of the protagonist of the manga series Claudine

== Ships ==
- Auguste (ship), which struck Cape Breton Island, Canada in 1761
- French ship Auguste, a ship of the French Navy, launched in 1778
- HMS Auguste (1705), a 54-gun French ship captured by the British in 1705

== Other uses ==
- Auguste (restaurant), a Michelin starred restaurant in Maarssen, Netherlands
- Auguste clown, a type of clown
- Auguste Island, an Antarctic island in Gerlache Strait
