= Stjernen =

Stjernen is the Norwegian word for star in the definite form.

Stjernen may also refer to:

- Stjernen Hockey, an ice hockey club based in Fredrikstad, Norway
- Stjernen I, a former Norwegian Royal yacht
- Stjernen (II), the present Norwegian Royal Boat.
- Stjernen (newspaper), a Nebraskan newspaper
