= HMS Augusta =

Eight ships of the Royal Navy have borne the name HMS Augusta or HMS Auguste, whilst another two were planned:

- HMS Auguste (1705) was a 60-gun fourth rate captured from the French in 1705. She was wrecked in 1716 when she ran ashore on the island of Anholt (Denmark) in heavy weather.
- HMS Augusta (1736) was a 60-gun fourth rate launched in 1736 and broken up by 1765.
- HMS Augusta (1763) was a 64-gun third rate launched in 1763 and burnt in 1777.
- HMS Augusta (1771) was a yacht launched in 1771. She was renamed HMS Princess Augusta in 1773 and was sold in 1818.
- HMS Augusta (1795) was a gunboat and ex-barge purchased in 1795 and in service until at least 1801.
- HMS Augusta was to have been a 74-gun third rate. She was laid down in 1806 but was cancelled in 1809.
- HMS Augusta (1819) was a schooner, formerly in civilian service under the name Policy. She was purchased in 1819 and sold in 1823.
- HMS Augusta (1853) was a two-gun schooner launched in 1853 and in service until at least 1866.
- HMS Augusta was to have been a Catherine-class minesweeper. She was to have been transferred to the Royal Navy in 1943 but was retained by the US Navy as USS Devastator.

== See also ==
- HMY Augusta was an eight-gun royal yacht launched in 1677 as HMY Charlotte. She was renamed HMY Augusta in 1761 and was broken up in 1771.
- HMS Princess Augusta
- French ship Auguste
