= HMS Coventry (1695) =

Ship of the line of the Royal Navy

History

England
- Name: HMS Coventry
- Ordered: 16 November 1693
- Builder: Fisher Harding, Deptford Dockyard
- Launched: 20 April 1695
- Captured: 24 July 1704

General characteristics
- Class & type: 50-gun fourth rate ship of the line
- Tons burthen: 667 81/94 bm
- Length: 106 ft (32.3 m) (keel)
- Beam: 34 ft 5 in (10.5 m)
- Depth of hold: 13 ft 6 in (4.1 m)
- Propulsion: Sails
- Sail plan: Full-rigged ship
- Armament: 50 guns: Lower gundeck 20 x 12 pdr guns; Upper gundeck 22 x demi-culverins (9 pdr guns); Quarterdeck 6 x minions (4 pdr guns); Forecastle 2 x minions (4 pdr guns)

HMS Coventry was a 50-gun fourth rate ship of the line of the English Royal Navy, one of five such ships authorised on 16 November 1693 (three to be built in different Royal Dockyards and two to be built by commercial contract). The Coventry was built by Master Shipwright Fisher Harding at Deptford Dockyard and launched there on 20 April 1695.

The French 54-gun ships Auguste and Jason, at that date operating as privateers, captured the Coventry (then commanded by Captain Henry Lawrence, and escorting a convoy outbound for Newfoundland) on 24 July 1704 about 200 miles southwest of the Isles of Scilly.

On 6 May 1709, Portland recaptured Coventry at Bastimentos (near Puerto Bello), but she was not taken back into British service and was instead broken up.

== See also ==
- List of ships captured in the 18th century

== See also ==
- List of ships captured in the 18th century
