= HMS Princess Augusta =

Two ships of the Royal Navy have borne the name HMS Princess Augusta:

- HMS Princess Augusta was a yacht launched in 1771 as HMS Augusta. She was renamed HMS Princess Augusta in 1773 and was sold in 1818.
- HMS Princess Augusta, previously the Danish HDMS Kronprindsens Lystfregat, was a yacht launched in 1785 for the Prince Royal of Denmark. The Danes returned her to Britain in 1807 after the Battle of Copenhagen. The Admiralty took her into service as HMS Prince Frederick; she was renamed Princess Augusta in 1816 but was sold for breaking up in 1818.

== See also ==
- Hired armed cutter Princess Augusta
- HMS Princess
- HMS Augusta
