= Royal yacht =

Ship used by a monarch or a royal family

A royal yacht is a vessel commissioned for the exclusive use of a monarch or a royal family. If the monarch is an emperor the proper term is imperial yacht. Most of them are financed by the government of the country of which the monarch is head. The royal yacht is most often crewed by personnel from the navy and used by the monarch and their family on both private and official travels.

While some historical examples were privately funded, the majority of modern royal yachts are financed and maintained by the government of the country the monarch rules.

== History ==
Depending on how the term is defined royal yachts date back to the days of antiquity with royal barges on the Nile in ancient Egypt.

Later the Vikings produced royal vessels. They followed the pattern of longships although highly decorated and fitted with purple sails (purple sails remained standard for royal vessels the next 400 years).

In England, Henry V sold off the royal yachts to clear the Crown's debts. The next royal vessels in England were built in the Tudor period with Henry VIII using a vessel in 1520 that was depicted as having cloth of gold sails. James I had Disdain, a ship in miniature (she was later recorded as being able to carry about 30 tons), built for his son Prince Henry. Disdain was significant in that she allowed for pleasure cruising and as a result can be seen as an early move away from royal ships as warships.

The first ships to unquestionably qualify as royal yachts were those owned by Charles II of England Scotland and Ireland. The first was gift from the Dutch but later yachts were commissioned and built in England. This established a tradition of royal yachts in Britain that was later copied by other royal families of Europe. Through the 19th century royal yachts got larger as they became a symbol of national wealth. World War I brought this trend to an end and the royal families that survived found it harder to justify the cost with the result that there are only three royal yachts left in use in Europe. For the most part royal yachts have been superseded by the use of warships in this role, as royal yachts are often seen as a hard-to-justify expenditure. In addition most monarchies with a railway system employ a special set of ceremonial royal carriages. Most monarchies are also granted access to government owned aircraft for transportation.

== Yachts by country ==
=== Australia ===
- SS Gothic (1947)

=== Austria-Hungary ===
- Phantasie
- Miramar

=== Belgium ===
- La Clémentine (1897–1918)
- Alberta (1896–1914)
- Falcao Uno (1965)
- Alpa IV (2009–2022)

=== Denmark ===
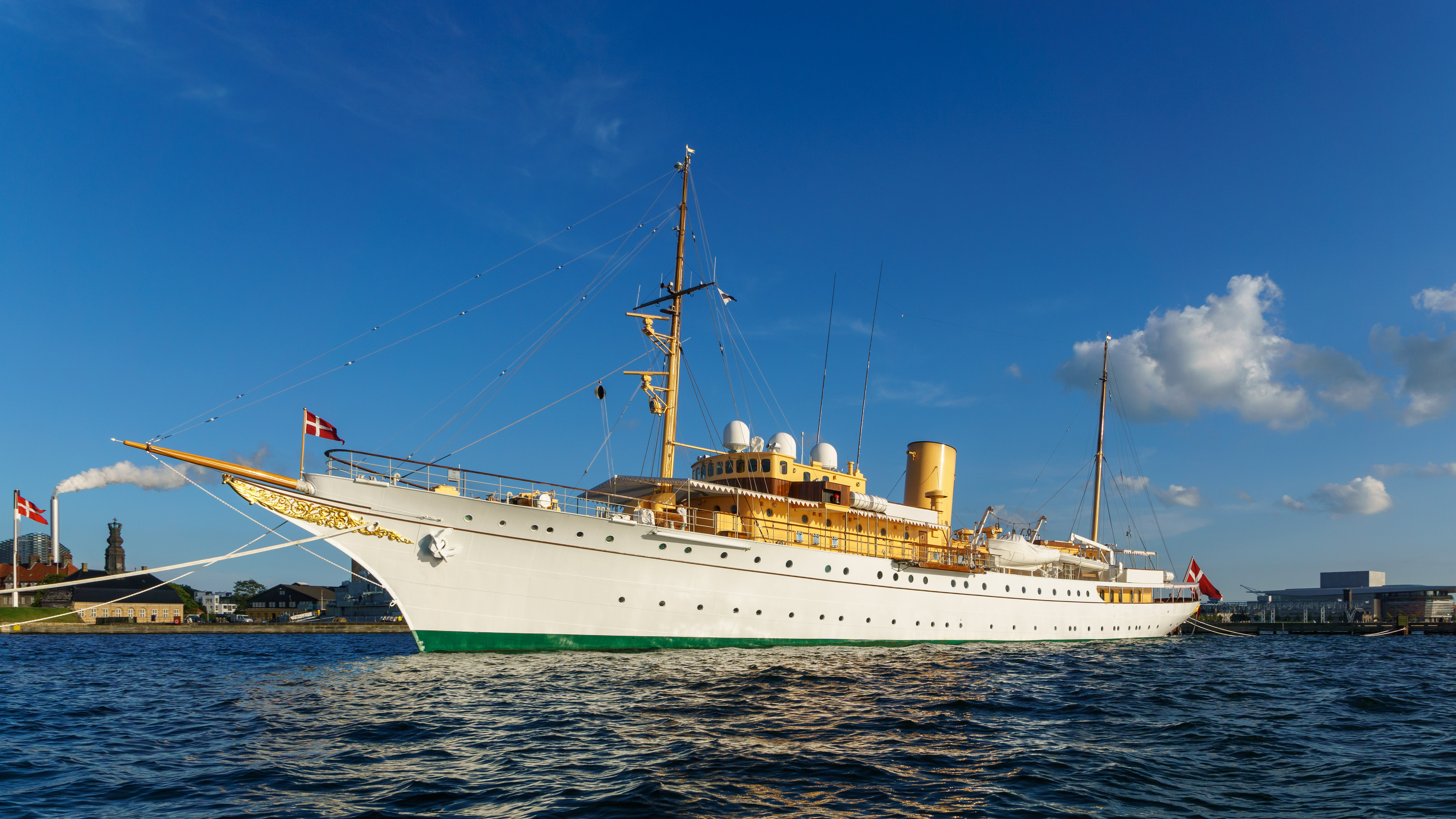
HDMY Dannebrog

The Danish royal family have had several royal yachts. Two of them have been named Dannebrog.

- HMDY Sophia Amalia (1650–1687)
- HMDY Elephanten (1687–1721)
- HDMS Kronprindsens Lystfregat (1785)
- HMDY Kiel (1824–1840)
- HDMY Ægir (1841–1855)
- HMDY Slesvig (1855–1879)
- HDMS Jylland (1874–1885) – a frigate which served as a royal yacht on occasion.
- HDMY Dannebrog (1879–1932)
- HDMY Dannebrog (1932–present)

=== Egypt ===
- Mahroussa (also known as El Horria) (1866–1951) was built for Isma'il Pasha, the Khedive of Egypt. She passed the Suez Canal during its opening. Lengthened twice, she was converted from paddle steamer to screw propellers. She now serves as a school ship for the Egyptian Navy.

=== Germany ===
During the existence of the German Empire, the Kaiser used these imperial yachts:

- SMY Hohenzollern (1878–1912); renamed SMY Kaiseradler in 1892
- SMY Hohenzollern II (1893–1914)
- SMY Hohenzollern III (begun in 1914 but never finished)

The Kriegsmarine fleet tender Grille was built as a state yacht for Adolf Hitler.

=== Greece ===
- Amphitrite

=== Hawaii ===
- Cleopatra's Barge (1820–1824) renamed Haʻaheo o Hawaiʻi ("Pride of Hawaii")
- Kamehameha III (until 1849), seized by the French when they invaded Honolulu

=== Iran ===
- Naseruddin
- Mozaffari (1902–1914), turned into gunboat
- Chahsevar (1936–1979), turned into corvette
- Kish (1970–1979), turned into training ship

=== Italy ===
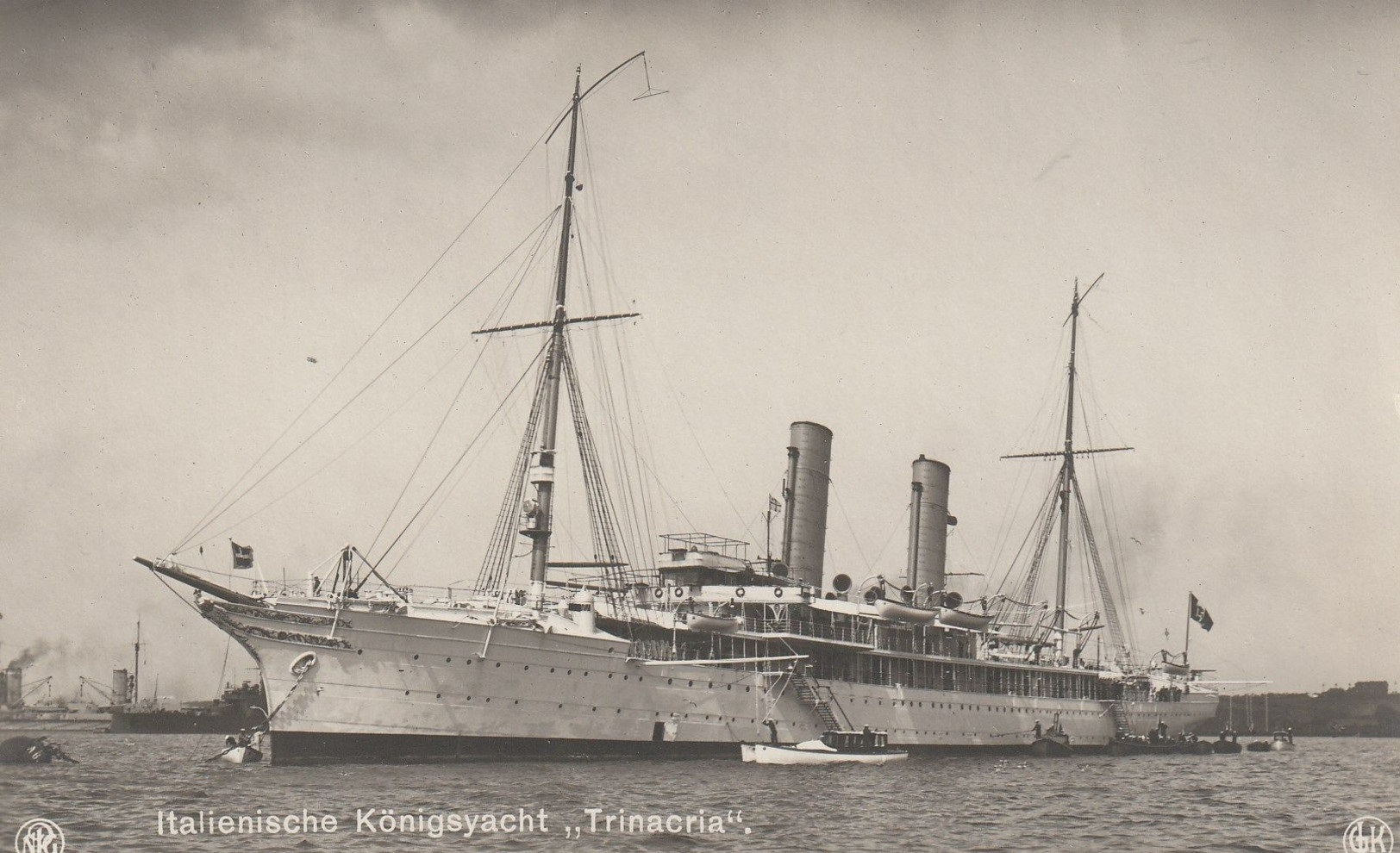
Trinacria

- Savoia (1883–1904)
- Trinacria (1900–1925), former steamship America
- Savoia (1923–1944)

=== Japan ===
- Banryu (1857–1888) An iron screw schooner, she was given to the shōgun Tokugawa Iesada by Queen Victoria to commemorate the Anglo-Japanese Treaty of Amity and Commerce.
- Jingei (1881–1903) A wooden-hulled paddle steamer designed by Léonce Verny.
- Hatsukaze (1902–1945) presented by Baron Hisaya Iwasaki to the Crown Prince (later Emperor Taisho) to commemorate his visit of the Mitsubishi Shipyard in Nagasaki.

=== Jordan ===
King Hussein of Jordan was aboard his royal yacht (name not reported) in the Gulf of Aqaba when on 7 June 1981 it was overflown by eight low-flying Israeli F-16s en route to attack the Osirak reactor in Iraq during Operation Opera. One of the pilots described it as 'stunning white... incredible'.

=== Monaco ===
- Princess Alice (1891 by Prince Albert I) 53 m (174 ft)
- Deo Juvante II (1956–1958 by Prince Rainier III and Princess Grace) 45 m (147 ft)
- Carostefal (1964 by Prince Rainier III and Princess Grace) 18 m (59 ft)
- Stalca (1971–1972 by Prince Rainier III and Princess Grace) 25 m (82 ft)
- Pacha III (1990–present by Princess Caroline)

=== Morocco ===
- El Boughaz I (2006–present)

=== Netherlands ===
Koningssloep

- Koningssloep (1818–present)
- De Groene Draeck (1957–present)
- Jumbo VI (1997-2005), a Moonen 85
- Aldebaran (2014–2021), a Wajer 38
- Alma (2021–present), a Wajer 55

=== Norway ===
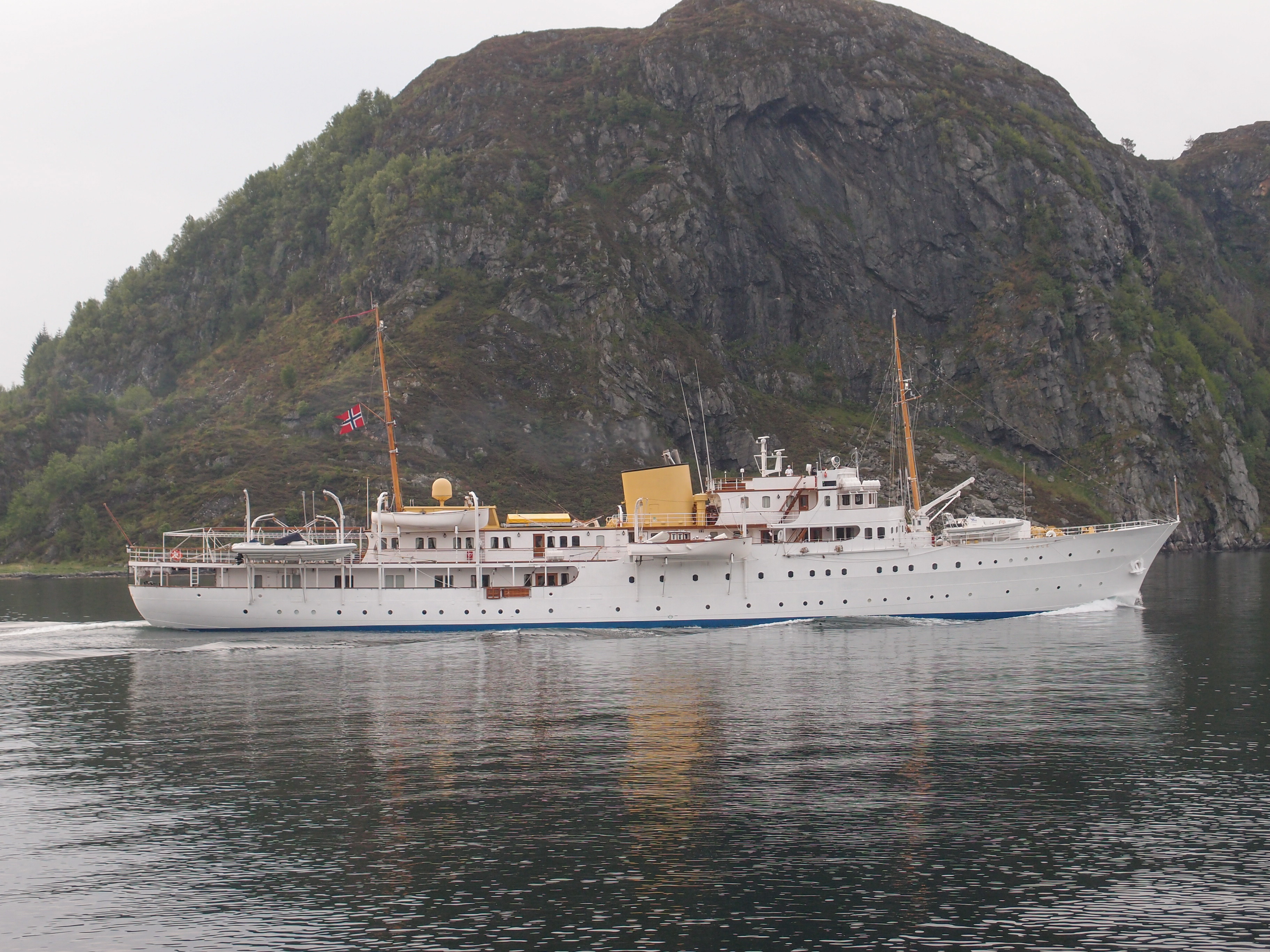
Norge

King Haakon VII received the royal yacht Norge as a gift from the people of Norway in 1947. The royal yacht is owned by the king but maintained and crewed by the Royal Norwegian Navy. Before this other naval ships had served as royal sea transport and the king used some smaller boats for short trips mostly on official occasions.

- Sophia Amalia (1650–?)
- Elephanten (1687–1721)
- Heimdal (1892–1946)
- Stjernen I (1899–1940)
- Stjernen II (1945–present)
- Norge (1947–present)
- Horten (1985)

=== Oman ===
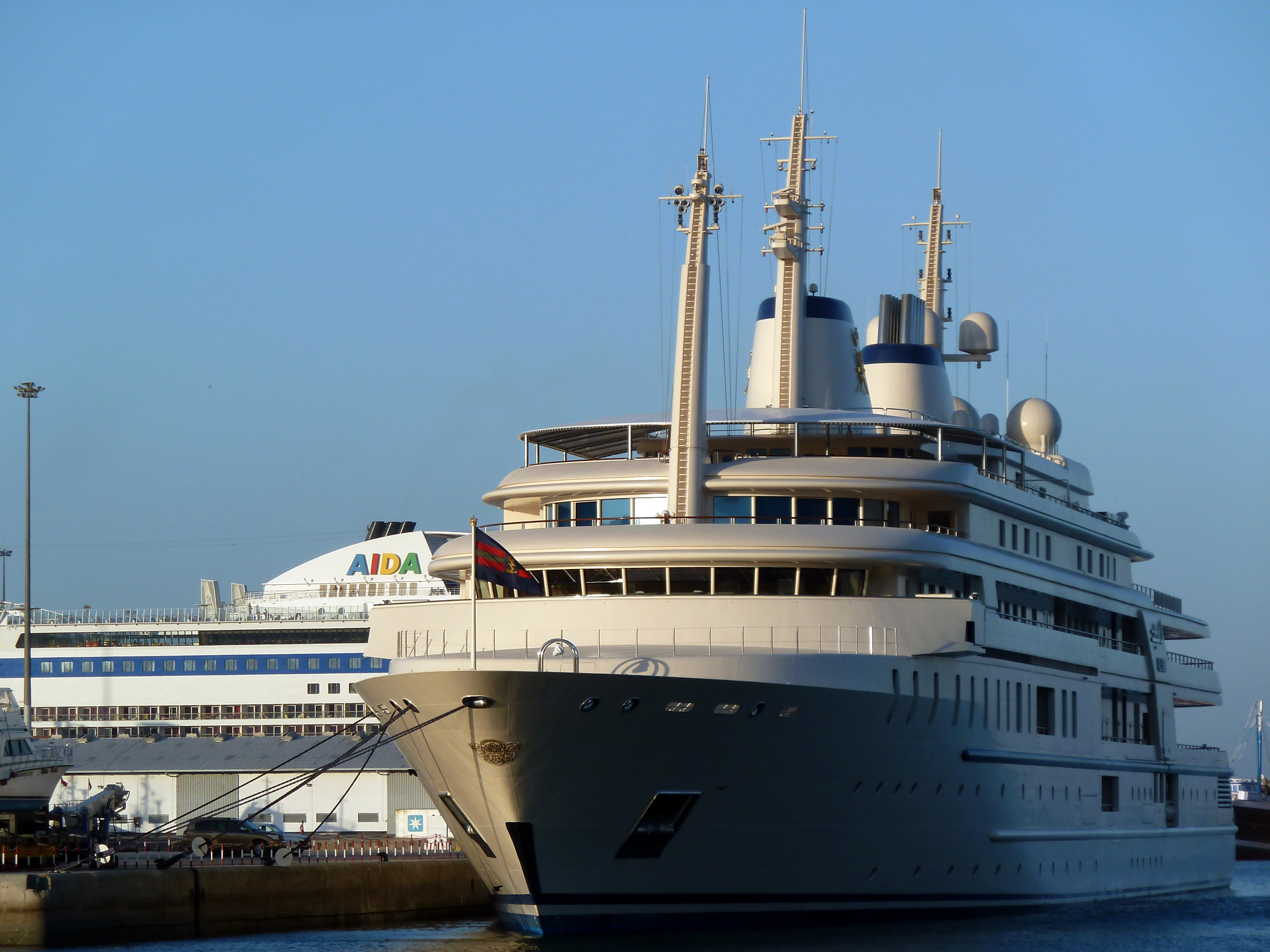
The MY Al Said operated by the Oman Royal Yacht Squadron

The Oman Royal Yacht Squadron operates the following major vessels from Muscat and Muttrah in Oman:

Name	Length (m)	Shipyard	Year	Description
Al Said	155	Lürssen, Germany	2007	Has a helipad, orchestra and swimming pool. It is berthed in Mutrah port most of the time
Fulk al Salamah	165	Mariotti Yachts, Italy	2016	Replacement support vessel and secondary yacht.
Al Dhaferah	136	Bremer Vulkan, Germany	1987	Retained as logistics and helicopter support ship.
Zinat al Bihaar	61	Oman Royal Yacht Squadron	1988	Luxury sailing yacht built in Oman with imported engine from Siemens
Al-Noores	33.5	K. Damen Netherlands	1982	Specialized tug boat for the other royal yachts

=== Ottoman Empire ===
The Imperial Ottoman Government used many yachts for its head of state. These include:

- Tesrifiye
- İzzeddin
- Sultaniye
- Talia
- Ertuğrul

The Republic of Turkey also has presidential yachts

=== Portugal ===
- Veloz (22.6 m or 74 ft): 1858
- Sirius (22.5 m or 74 ft): 1876
- Amélia I (35 m or 115 ft): 1888
- Amélia II (45 m or 148 ft): 1897
- Amélia III (55 m or 180 ft): 1898
- Amélia IV (70 m or 230 ft): 1901

The Portuguese King Charles I used four successive royal yachts, all named Amélia, after his wife, Queen Amélie of Orleans. These yachts were, mainly, used by Charles I for his oceanographic missions. It was in the Amélia IV that King Manuel II and the Portuguese royal family left the country for the exile, after the republican revolution of 5 October 1910. In the republican regime, the Amélia IV was integrated in the Portuguese Navy as the survey ship NRP 5 de Outubro.

=== Romania ===
- Ștefan cel Mare
- Luceafarul

=== Russia ===
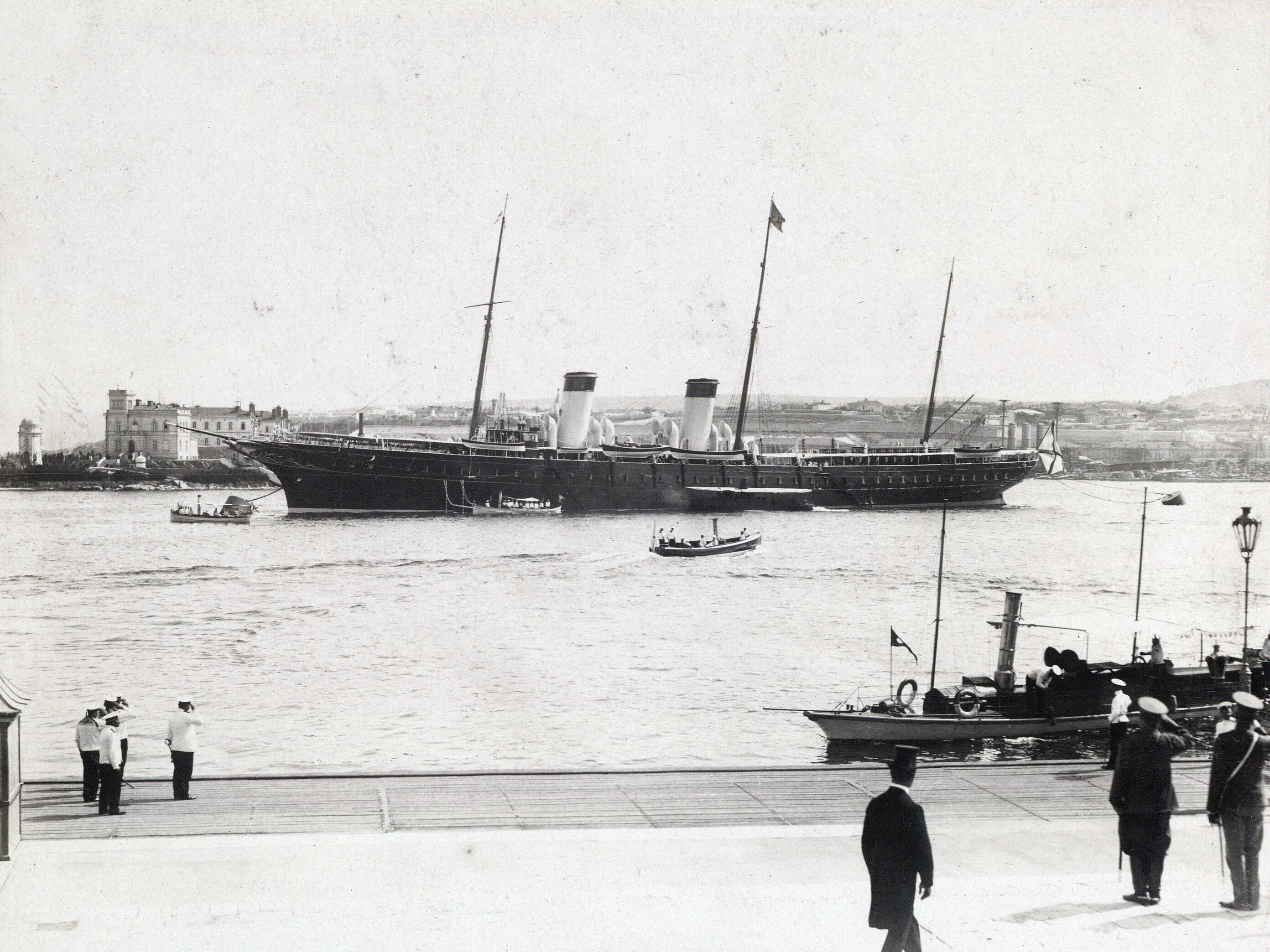
Standart in Sevastopol in 1909

Imperial yachts employed by the Tsar of Russia:

- Alexandria (I) (1851–1906)
- Standart (I) (1857–1892)
- Derzhava (1871–1905)
- Tsarevna (1874–1917)
- Livadia (1873–1878); wrecked in Crimea October 21–22, 1878
- Livadia (1880–1926); flawed experimental ship, retired and hulked soon after commissioning. Used by the Romanovs only twice.
- Polyarnaya Zvezda (1890–1917/1961)
- Alexandria (II) (1904–1917/1927)
- Standart (II) (1895–1917/1936–1961 as Soviet Navy minelayer Marti)

=== Saudi Arabia ===
- Prince Abdulaziz (1984–) Now owned by descendants of Prince Sultan bin Abdul Aziz
- Al Riyadh (1978–)
- Al Salamah (1999–)
- Issham al Baher (1973–)

=== Spain ===
- Giralda (1900–1918) 95 m (312 ft)
- The luxury yacht Fortuna belonged to King Juan Carlos I until he renounced it in 2013.

=== Sweden ===
- Vasaorden (1774–present)
- Drott (1883–1923)

=== United Arab Emirates ===
Dubai is the personal yacht of Sheikh Mohammed bin Rashid Al Maktoum, ruler of Dubai and Prime Minister of the United Arab Emirates. Completed in 2006, she is the third largest yacht currently in service at 524 feet (160 m) long. She came to world media attention when she sailed out to welcome the retired ocean liner, Queen Elizabeth 2 to Dubai in November 2008.

Another personal yacht of the Sheikh is the 40-metre (130 ft) Alloya, built by Sanlorenzo in 2013.

=== United Kingdom ===
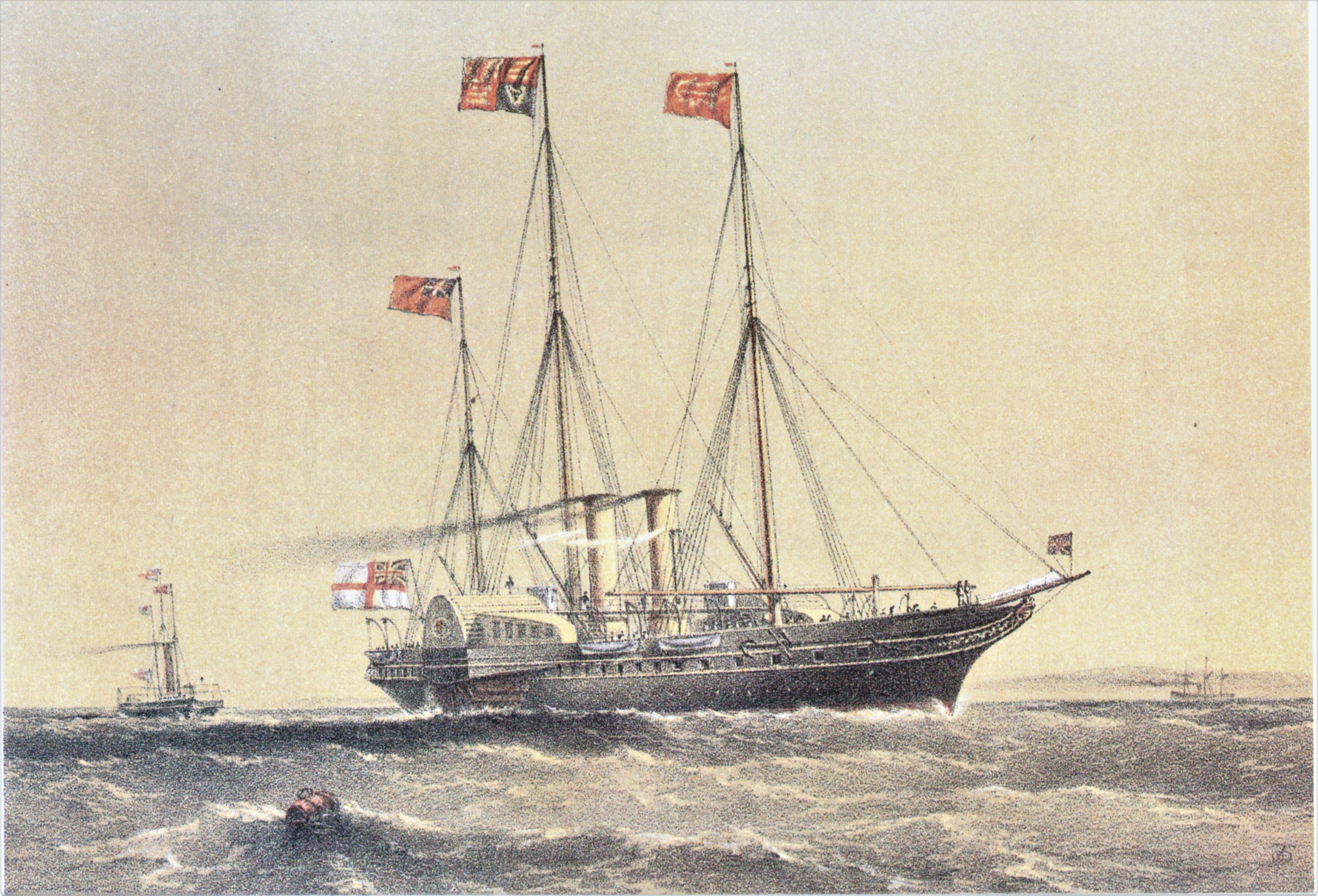
William Frederick Mitchell (before 1881) HMY Victoria and Albert

The United Kingdom has had 83 royal yachts since the restoration of Charles II of England in 1660. Charles II himself had 25 royal yachts, while five were simultaneously in service in 1831. Since the decommissioning of Britannia in 1997 the British monarchy no longer has a royal yacht.

=== Other nations ===
The Principality of Monaco owned the princely yacht Deo Juvante II between 1956–1958. This Camper and Nicholsons yacht was a wedding gift from Aristotle Onassis to Prince Rainer and Grace Kelly and was used on their honeymoon. The yacht, now called M/Y Grace, is now owned and operated by Quasar Expeditions.

Yugoslavia had some royal yachts before World War II (most notably, one was a sister ship of Ilinden which sank in Lake Ohrid in 2009).

Zanzibar had only one naval ship in 1896, the royal yacht HHS Glasgow. It was sunk by the British during the shortest war in history, the Anglo-Zanzibar War.

Other nations that employ some form of yacht presently or in the past include China and Sarawak.

== See also ==
- Air transports of heads of state and government
- Official state car
- Presidential yacht
- Royal train

== Sources ==
- Article in Vi Menn magazine number 31 2006
- Claire, Rodger (2004). Raid on the Sun: Inside Israel's Secret Campaign that Denied Saddam the Bomb. Broadway Books. ISBN 978-0-7679-1400-0.
- Madge, Tim (1997). Royal Yachts of the World. East Molesey, Surrey, UK: Thomas Reed. ISBN 978-09012-8-174-6.

=== Further reading ===
- Crabtree, Reginald (1975). Royal Yachts of Europe: From the Seventeenth to the Twentieth Century. Newton Abbot, Devon: David & Charles. ISBN 0-715-36754-4.
- Frampton, Viktor (2012). "Question 25/46: Imperial German Yachts". Warship International. XLIX (3): 225–226. ISSN 0043-0374.
- Major, Alan (2011). Royal Yachts. Stroud, UK: Amberley Publishing. ISBN 978-1-4456-0189-2.
