= Sir Thomas Hardy, 1st Baronet =

Royal Navy officer (1769–1839)

Vice-Admiral Sir Thomas Hardy Bt GCB
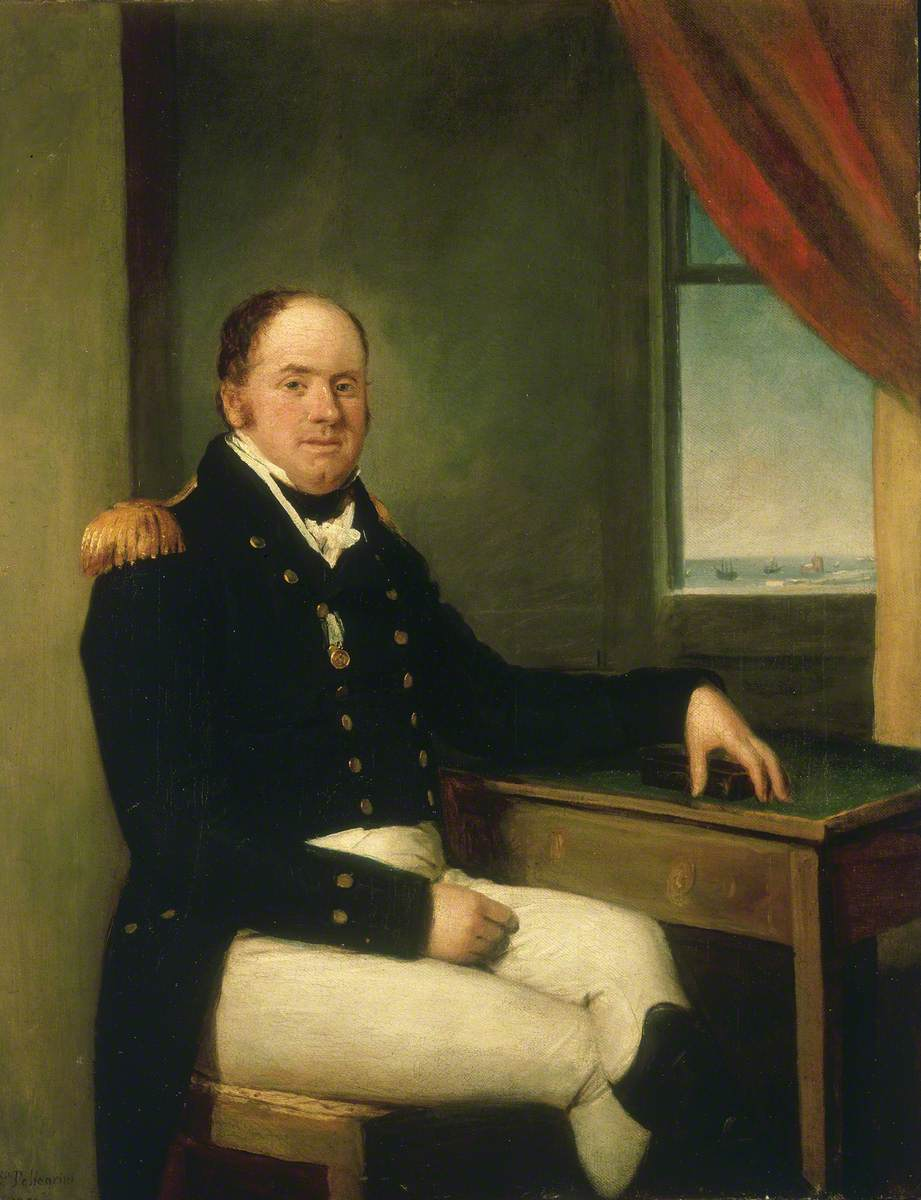
- Portrait by Domenico Pellegrini, 1809
- Born: Thomas Masterman Hardy; 5 April 1769; Kingston Russell, Dorset
- Died: 20 September 1839 (aged 70); Greenwich, London
- Military career
- Allegiance: Great Britain; United Kingdom; Portugal
- Branch: Royal Navy; Portuguese Navy
- Service years: 1790–1839; 1809–1830 (Portugal)
- Rank: Vice-Admiral; Commodore (Portugal)
- Commands: HMS Mutine; HMS Vanguard; HMS Foudroyant; HMS Princess Charlotte; HMS San Josef; HMS St George; HMS Isis; HMS Amphion; HMS Victory; HMS Triumph; HMS Barfleur; HMS Ramillies; HMS Princess Augusta; South America Station; Greenwich Hospital
- Conflicts: French Revolutionary Wars; Action of 19 December 1796; Battle of Cape St. Vincent; Battle of the Nile; Battle of Copenhagen; Napoleonic Wars; Battle of Trafalgar; War of 1812
- Awards: Knight Grand Cross of the Order of the Bath

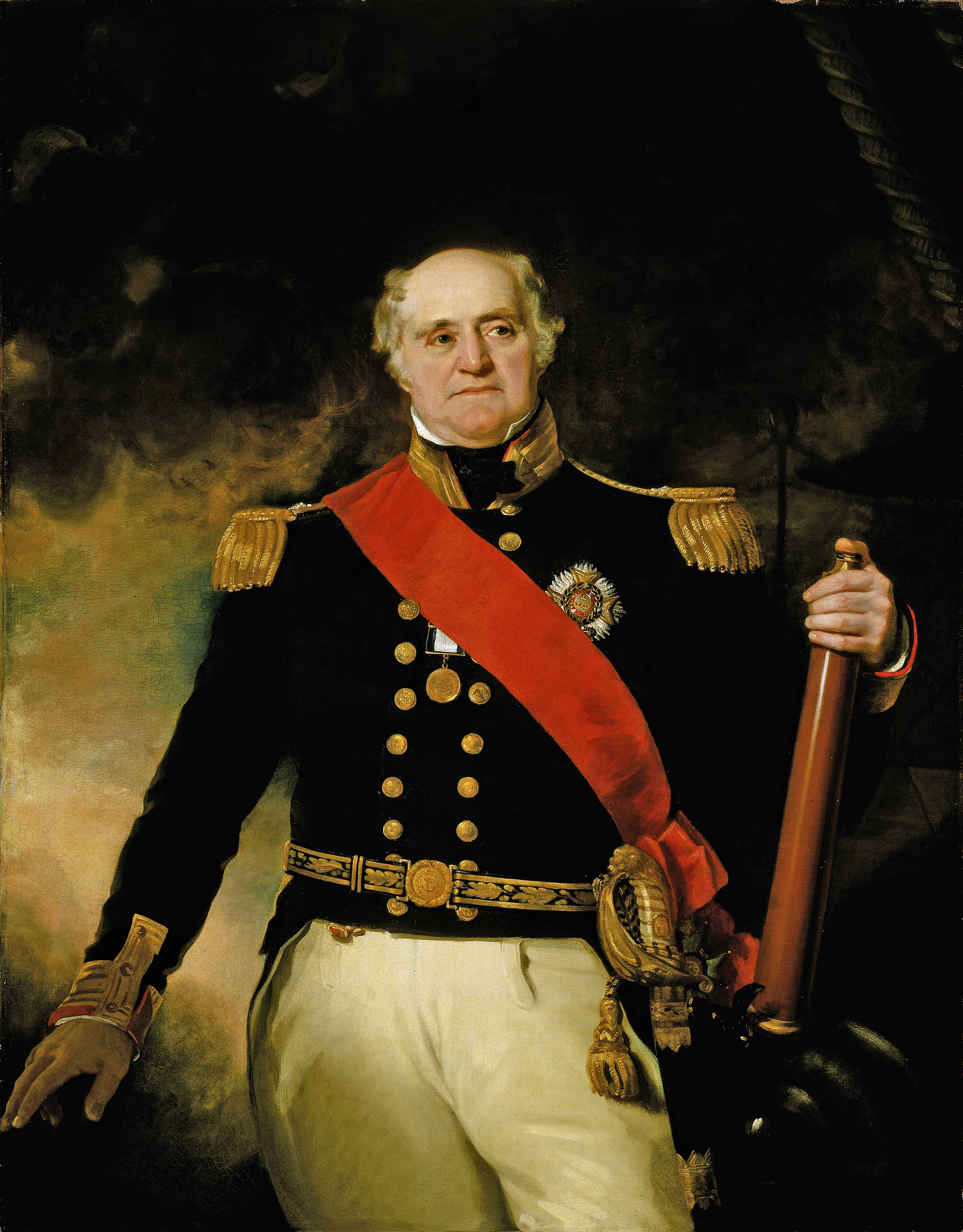
Portrait of Sir Thomas Hardy by Richard Evans, 1834

Vice-Admiral Sir Thomas Masterman Hardy, 1st Baronet, GCB (5 April 1769 – 20 September 1839) was a Royal Navy officer who served in the French Revolutionary and Napoleonic Wars. He took part in the Battle of Cape St. Vincent in February 1797, the Battle of the Nile in August 1798 and the Battle of Copenhagen in April 1801 during the French Revolutionary Wars. Hardy served as flag captain to Vice-Admiral Lord Nelson, and commanded HMS Victory at the Battle of Trafalgar in October 1805 during the Napoleonic Wars. Nelson was shot as he paced the decks with Hardy, and as he lay dying, Nelson's famous remark of "Kiss me, Hardy" was directed at him. Hardy went on to become First Naval Lord in November 1830 and in that capacity refused to become a Member of Parliament and encouraged the introduction of steam warships.

== Early life ==
Born the second son of Joseph Hardy and Nanny Hardy (née Masterman) at Kingston Russell House in Long Bredy (or according to some sources in Winterborne St Martin), Hardy joined the navy with his entry aboard the brig HMS Helena on 30 November 1781 as a captain's servant, but left her in April 1782 to attend Crewkerne Grammar School. During his time at school his name was carried on the books of the sixth-rate HMS Seaford and the third-rate HMS Carnatic.

== Mediterranean and Nelson ==
Hardy joined the fifth-rate HMS Hebe on 5 February 1790 as a midshipman; he later transferred to the sixth-rate HMS Tisiphone under Captain Anthony Hunt, and then followed Hunt to the sixth-rate HMS Amphitrite in May 1793, going out to the Mediterranean in her. Hardy served off Marseilles and Toulon and was commissioned second lieutenant of the fifth-rate HMS Meleager under Captain Charles Tyler on 10 November 1793.

Command of Meleager passed to Captain George Cockburn in June 1794; Cockburn took command of the fifth-rate HMS Minerve in August 1796 and Hardy went with him, subsequently becoming his first lieutenant. Horatio Nelson, then a commodore, moved his broad pennant to Minerve in December 1796. While en route to Gibraltar, in the action of 19 December 1796, Minerve and her consort, the fifth-rate HMS Blanche, engaged two Spanish frigates and forced Santa Sabina to surrender. Lieutenants Hardy and Culverhouse were sent aboard Santa Sabina with a prize crew, and the three ships continued on towards Gibraltar. Before the night was out, Nelson ran into the Spanish fleet and only managed to get away when Hardy drew the Spanish away from Minerve and fought until being dismasted and captured. Hardy and Culverhouse were almost immediately exchanged for the captain of Santa Sabina, Don Jacobo Stuart, and were able to rejoin Minerve at Gibraltar on 9 February 1797.

Three days later Minerve left Gibraltar to join the main fleet off the south-east coast of Spain under Sir John Jervis. With two enemy ships pursuing him, Cockburn ordered more sail. During this operation, a topman fell overboard. The ship hove to and a boat with Hardy in it was lowered to search for the missing mariner. As the enemy ships were closing fast, Cockburn thought it prudent to withdraw, but Nelson overruled him crying "By God, I'll not lose Hardy, back that mizzen topsail!" This confused the Spaniards who checked their own progress, allowing Hardy to return to his ship and make good his escape.

== Command and the Nile ==
Hardy remained with Minerve until May 1797 when, following a successful cutting out expedition of which he was in charge, he was promoted to master and commander of the newly captured corvette HMS Mutine. Under Hardy's command, Mutine joined a squadron under Captain Thomas Troubridge which met up with Nelson off Toulon in June 1798, located Napoleon Bonaparte in Egypt and destroyed the French fleet at the Battle of the Nile in August 1798. Afterwards, Nelson's flag captain, Edward Berry was sent home with dispatches and Hardy was promoted to captain of Nelson's flagship, HMS Vanguard, in his place on 2 October 1798.

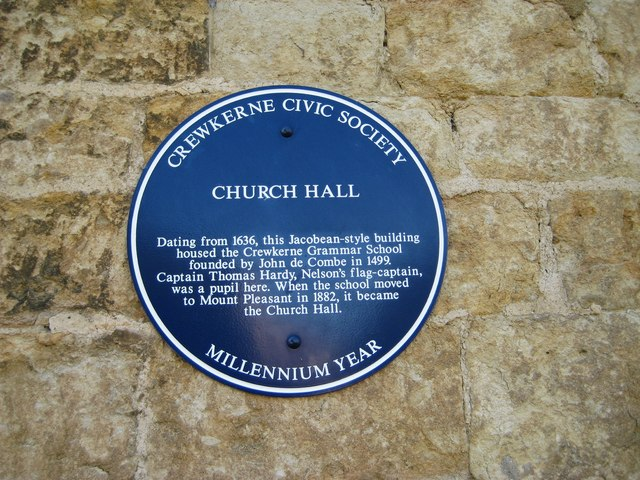
Blue plaque commemorating the former use of the Church Hall at Crewkerne as Crewkerne Grammar School where Hardy was a pupil

HMS Vanguard carried King Ferdinand IV and the British ambassador Sir William Hamilton and his wife Emma from Naples to safety in Sicily in December 1798: Hardy did not altogether approve of Lady Hamilton who had once tried to intervene on behalf of a boat's crew – Hardy had the crew flogged twice, once for the original offence and again for petitioning the lady. Nelson transferred his flag to the third-rate HMS Foudroyant on 8 June 1799, taking Hardy with him. In June 1799, the main fleet, led by Foudroyant, landed marines at Naples to assist with the overthrow of the Parthenopean Republic so allowing Ferdinand's kingdom to be re-established. Hardy handed over command of Foudroyant to Sir Edward Berry on 13 October 1799, transferred to the fifth-rate HMS Princess Charlotte and returned to England.

== Baltic and Copenhagen ==
After a year ashore, Hardy went to Plymouth Dock in December 1800 to take command of the first-rate HMS San Josef, which had just been refitted. He transferred to the second-rate HMS St George and became Nelson's flag captain once more in February 1801. Nelson was appointed second in command of the Baltic fleet, which had been sent to force the Danes to withdraw from the League of Armed Neutrality. On the night of 1 April 1801, Hardy was sent in a boat to take soundings around the anchored Danish fleet. Hardy's ship drew too much water and so took no part in the Battle of Copenhagen the following day, though his work proved to be of great value. The only two ships that went aground, the third-rates HMS Agamemnon and HMS Bellona, were taken in by local pilots and did not follow Hardy's recommended route. Hardy stayed on as flag captain to the new fleet commander, Vice-Admiral Charles Pole, until August 1801 when he took command of the fourth-rate HMS Isis.

== Mediterranean and West Indies Campaign ==
In July 1802, Hardy was appointed to the fifth-rate HMS Amphion which after taking the new British ambassador to Lisbon, returned to Portsmouth. Nelson was in Portsmouth, as he was due to hoist his flag in the first-rate HMS Victory in May 1803, but on finding the ship not ready for him, transferred his flag to the Amphion and set sail for the Mediterranean. Nelson and Hardy finally transferred to Victory off Toulon on 31 July 1803. Nelson's fleet continued to blockade Toulon until April 1805, when the French escaped and were pursued to the West Indies and back. After a brief stop at Spithead between 20 August and 14 September 1805, they set sail for Cádiz arriving on 29 September 1805. George Murray, Nelson's captain of the fleet, was obliged to remain in England and Hardy unofficially replaced him in addition to serving as flag captain.

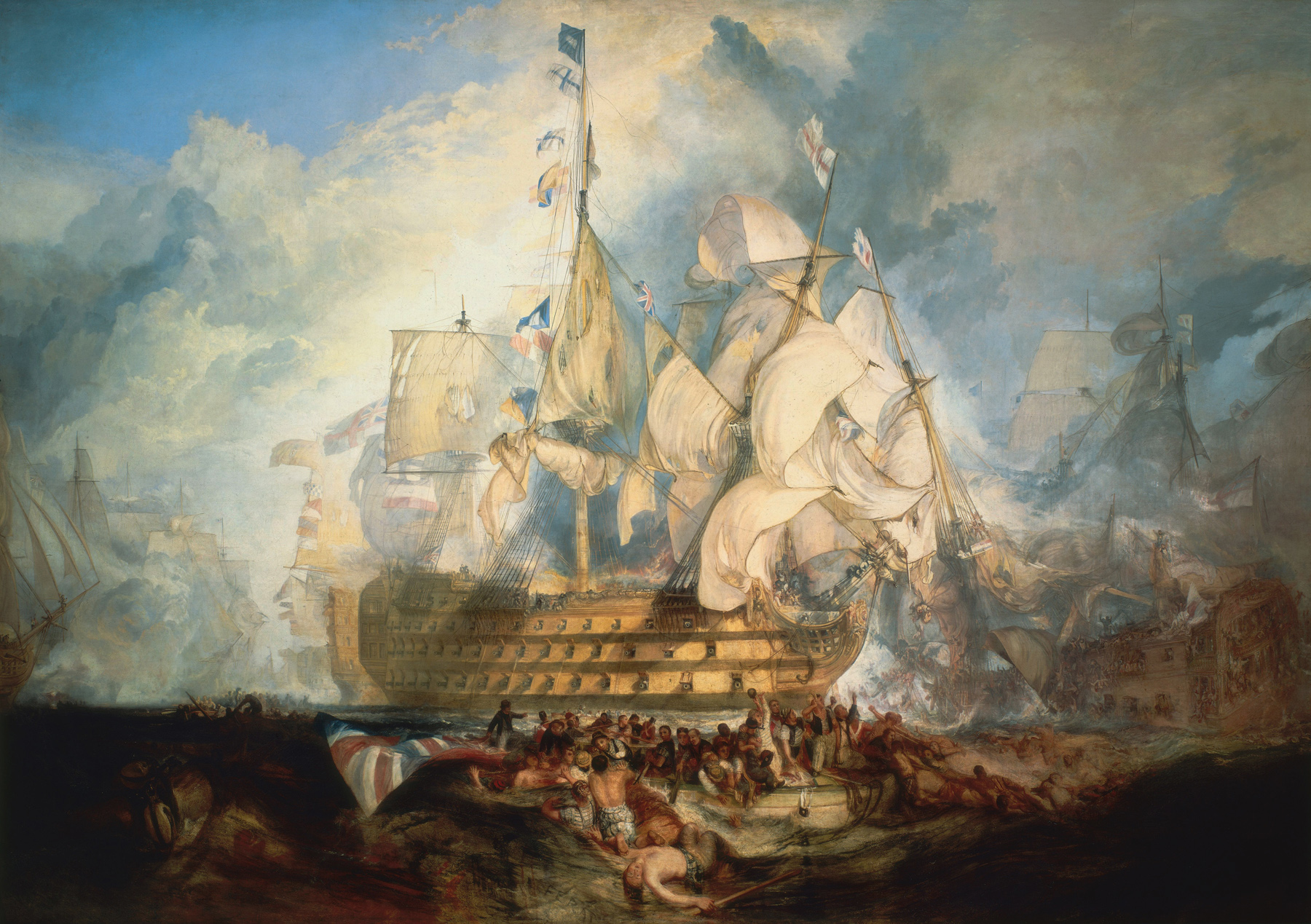
The Battle of Trafalgar by J. M. W. Turner (oil on canvas, 1822–1824) shows the last three letters of the famous signal, "England expects that every man will do his duty" flying from Victory.

== Trafalgar ==
As Victory approached the enemy line on the morning of 21 October 1805, Hardy urged Nelson to transfer to another ship to avoid the inevitable melee, but Nelson refused. Victory, leading the weather column, came under heavy fire in the opening stages of the Battle of Trafalgar. At one point, a splinter took the buckle from Hardy's shoe, to which Nelson remarked, "This is too warm work Hardy, to last for long". Hardy was with Nelson when he was shot and, towards the end of the battle, as Nelson lay below dying, the two had a number of conversations together. Hardy was able to tell Nelson that 14 or 15 enemy ships had struck their flags: Nelson replied that he had "bargained for 20". In their last conversation, Nelson reminded Hardy to anchor the fleet. Nelson went on to say "take care of my dear Lady Hamilton, Hardy, take care of poor Lady Hamilton" and then when the moment came for the two men to part for the last time, Nelson then very close to death, asked Hardy to kiss him. Hardy kissed him on the cheek; "Now I am satisfied," said Nelson, "Thank God I have done my duty". Hardy stood up and then having spent a few moments looking down silently at his friend, knelt and kissed him again on the forehead. "Who is that?" asked Nelson, now barely able to see. "It is Hardy" Hardy replied. "God bless you Hardy" was Nelson's last response. Victory was towed to Gibraltar, arriving on 28 October 1805, where she underwent major repairs, before setting set sail for England on 4 November 1805 and arriving at Portsmouth on 5 December 1805. There Nelson's body was transferred to the Sheerness Commissioner, Sir George Grey's yacht Chatham to proceed to Greenwich. Hardy carried one of the banners at Nelson's funeral procession on 9 January 1806.

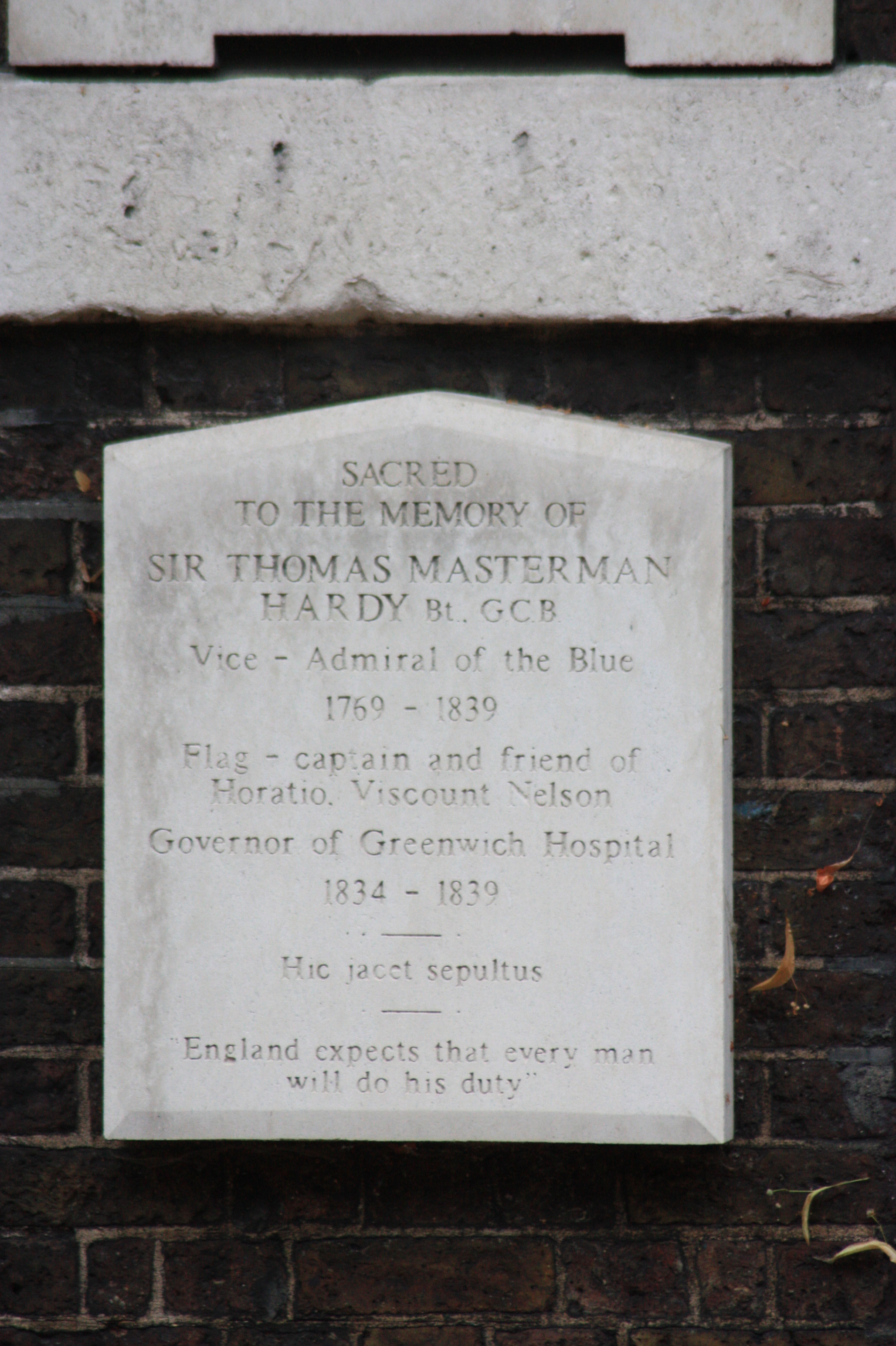
The gravestone of Sir Thomas Masterman Hardy, Greenwich Hospital Cemetery, London (telephoto)

== Later commands ==
Hardy was created a baronet on 29 January 1806 and was given command of the third-rate HMS Triumph on the North American Station in May 1806. While in Nova Scotia, he married Anna Louisa Berkeley, the daughter of his commander-in-chief Admiral Sir George Cranfield Berkeley. When Berkeley was ordered to Lisbon, Hardy went with him as his flag Captain in the second-rate HMS Barfleur. Hardy was made a commodore in the Portuguese Navy in 1811, in which he served as a mercenary from 1809 to 1830.

In August 1812, Hardy was given command of the third-rate HMS Ramillies and was sent back to North America at the outbreak of the War of 1812. On 11 July 1814, Hardy in his flagship, assisted by Lieutenant Colonel Andrew Pilkington, led four other warships and several transports carrying 2,000 men of the 102nd Regiment of Foot and a company of Royal Artillery against Fort Sullivan in Eastport, Maine. The American defending force of 70 regulars and 250 militiamen gave up without a fight. Hardy and Pilkington issued a proclamation making it clear Great Britain considered Eastport and the several nearby islands to be British territory. Townspeople were required to take an oath of allegiance to the crown or leave. Two-thirds of the inhabitants took the oath, while 500 departed. For the few weeks he remained at the place, Hardy became a favourite of the locals, gaining great respect and popularity. However, Hardy's next venture, the 9–11 August bombardment of Stonington, Connecticut was a defeat; Royal Navy cannonading set 20 buildings on fire while killing a horse and a goose, while reports indicate the sizeable American defending force killed 21 and wounded 50 British attackers. Hardy was appointed a Knight Commander of the Order of the Bath on 2 January 1815.

Hardy was given command of the royal yacht HMS Princess Augusta in July 1816 and, then having been promoted to commodore, became Commander-in-Chief on the South America Station, hoisting his broad pennant in third-rate HMS Superb in August 1819, with a mission to prevent the Spanish from interfering in the newly emerging republics of Mexico, Colombia and Argentina.

While in Brazil, Hardy saw the country's independence and the withdrawal of Portuguese troops, until he was replaced by Sir George Eyre.

== Flag rank ==
Promoted to rear admiral on 27 May 1825, Hardy hoisted his flag aboard the third-rate HMS Wellesley and escorted 4,000 British troops to Lisbon, where they helped to quell a revolution by the eight-year-old queen's uncle in December 1826. He was subsequently given command of an experimental squadron in the Channel, moving his flag from the fifth-rate HMS Sybille to the sixth-rate HMS Pyramus before going ashore for the last time on 21 October 1827.

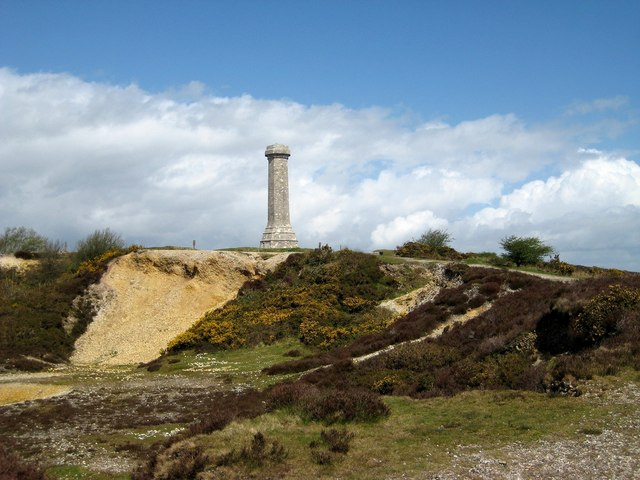
Hardy's monument on Black Down, Dorset.

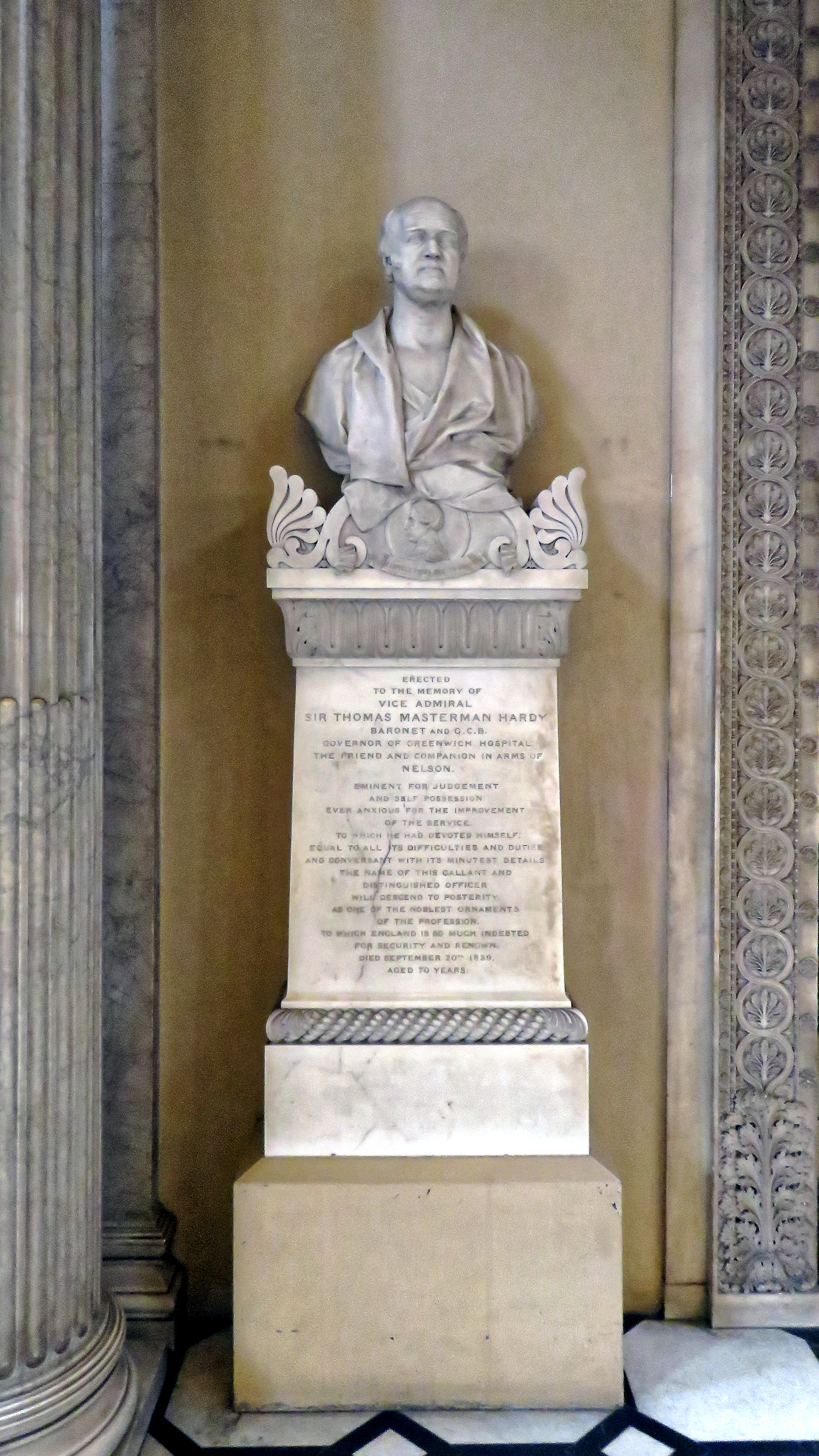
Memorial to Hardy by William Behnes in the Old Royal Naval College chapel at Greenwich.

Hardy became First Naval Lord in the Grey ministry in November 1830 and was advanced to Knight Grand Cross of the Order of the Bath on 13 September 1831. As first Naval Lord he refused to become a Member of Parliament and encouraged the introduction of steam warships. He resigned in August 1834 to become Governor of Greenwich Hospital. Hardy was promoted to vice admiral on 10 January 1837.

He died at Greenwich on 20 September 1839. He is buried in the officers vault in Greenwich Hospital Cemetery, just west of National Maritime Museum. The grave lies in the enclosed railed area of the now mainly cleared graveyard, which now serves as a pocket park. The baronetcy became extinct on his death.

== Family ==
On 17 November 1807 Hardy married Louisa Emily Anna Berkeley, daughter of Admiral Sir George Cranfield Berkeley; they had three daughters:

- Louisa Georgina Hardy (7 December 1808 – 1875).
- Emily Georgina Hardy (30 December 1809 – 8 April 1887); married in 1850 William Pollett Brown Chatteris (1810–1889), of Sandleford Priory, Berkshire.
- Mary Charlotte Hardy (20 March 1813 – 1896); married in 1833 Sir John Murray-Macgregor, 3rd Baronet.

Lady Hardy had "a kind of love affair on paper" with the poet Lord Byron, a distant relative of hers, in around 1822.

== Hardy Monument ==
The Hardy Monument is a 72-foot (22 m) high monument erected on Dorset's Black Down hill in 1844 by public subscription in memory of Hardy. Admiral Hardy had lived in nearby Portesham, and his family owned the Portesham estate which stretched from the middle of Portesham to Black Down. The monument's site was chosen because the Hardy family wanted a monument which could be used as a landmark for shipping. The monument has been shown on navigational charts since 1846 and is visible from a distance of at least 9 miles (14 kilometres).

== Literary tribute ==
Letitia Elizabeth Landon's poetical illustration Sir Thomas Hardy. to Richard Evans' portrait, describes aspects of Hardy's career. This was published in Fisher's Drawing Room Scrap Book, 1836

== Honours and Arms ==
His honours included:

- Knight Grand Cross of the Bath (GCB) – 13 September 1831
- Knight Commander of the Bath (KCB) – 2 January 1815
- Baronet – 29 January 1806

Coat of arms of Sir Thomas Masterman Hardy, Bt
Crest Out of a naval coronet, Or, a griffin's head, as in the arms. Escutcheon Pean, on a chevron, Or, between three escallops, Argent, as many griffins' heads, erased, of the Field.

== Sources ==
- Broadley, Alexander (1906). The Three Dorset Captains at Trafalgar. J. Murray. ISBN 978-1146226820.
- Ellis, James H. (2009). A Ruinous and Unhappy War: New England and the War of 1812. New York: Algora Publishing. ISBN 978-0875866901.
- Hibbert, Christopher (1994). Nelson A Personal History. Basic Books. ISBN 0-201-40800-7.
- Hutchins, John (1861). History and Antiquities of the County of Dorset, 3rd edition, II. ASIN B0018KJHLO.
- Heathcote, Tony (2005). Nelson's Trafalgar Captains and Their Battles. Leo Cooper Ltd. ISBN 978-1844151820.
- Laughton, John Knox (1890). "Hardy, Thomas Masterman" . In Stephen, Leslie; Lee, Sidney (eds.). Dictionary of National Biography. Vol. 24. London: Smith, Elder & Co.
- Graes, Isabel; Nunes, João Andrade (2023). Dicionário do Almirantado Português (PDF) (in Portuguese). Lisbon: Academia de Marinha. p. 174.

Military offices
Preceded by Sir George Cockburn	First Naval Lord; 1830–1834	Succeeded by George Dundas
Preceded by Sir Richard Keats	Governor, Greenwich Hospital; 1834–1839	Succeeded by Sir Robert Stopford
Baronetage of the United Kingdom
New creation	Baronet (of the Navy); 1806–1839	Extinct
Preceded by Prevost baronets	Hardy baronets of the Navy; 4 February 1806	Succeeded by Bromhead baronets
