= Auguste (ship) =

Several ships have been named Auguste:

- Auguste (1758 ship) was a full-rigged sailing ship that sank at Aspy Bay, Cape Breton, Nova Scotia in 1761 while carrying exiles from the fall of New France.
- Auguste, of 10 guns and 50 men, was a French letter of marque that HMS Melpomene captured on 17 June 1800 as Auguste was sailing from Bordeaux to Guadaloupe. She had been commissioned in February 1800.
- Auguste (1808 privateer) was an 18-gun privateer commissioned at Bordeaux that HMS Emerald captured on 6 April 1811.
- Auguste, of Saint-Malo, was a privateer of two guns and 24 men that HMS Helena captured on 28 February 1809. She was a privateer barge of 47 tons ("of load"), commissioned in March 1808. Her first cruise, with two guns and 20 men under Feillet, was from March 1808 to no later than April 1808. She made another cruise in February 1809 under Huon, with 24 men and 2 guns, that ended in her capture by HMS Helena.
- Auguste (1811 privateer) was a 14-gun privateer commissioned in Saint-Malo. She captured numerous British merchant vessels before the Royal Navy forced her in January 1814 to run onshore and wreck.

== See also ==
- French ship Auguste – one of 12 French naval vessels by that name
- HMS Auguste (1705) – British naval fourth rate wrecked on the island of Anholt (Denmark), on 11 November 1716
