= French ship Auguste =

Twelve vessels of the French Navy have borne the name Auguste ("August", or Augustus):

== Ships ==
- Auguste (1670), a six-gun fire ship.
- Auguste (1704), a 56-gun ship of the line.
- Auguste (1708) (1708), a 56-gun ship of the line.
- Auguste (1741), a 50-gun ship of the line.
- Auguste (1778), an 80-gun ship of the line.
- Auguste (1783), a 24-gun corvette.
- Auguste was a 4-gun brigantine commissioned in the Mediterranean in 1793 or 1794 that the British Royal Navy captured at Calvi on 10 August 1794.
- Auguste (1800), a brig.
- Auguste (1803), a 6-gun brig.
- Auguste (1807), a gunboat.
- Auguste (1811), an 80-gun ship of the line.
- Auguste was a French gunboat of two guns and 37 men that HMS Weazel captured on 24 August 1814.
Ships of the French Navy named Auguste
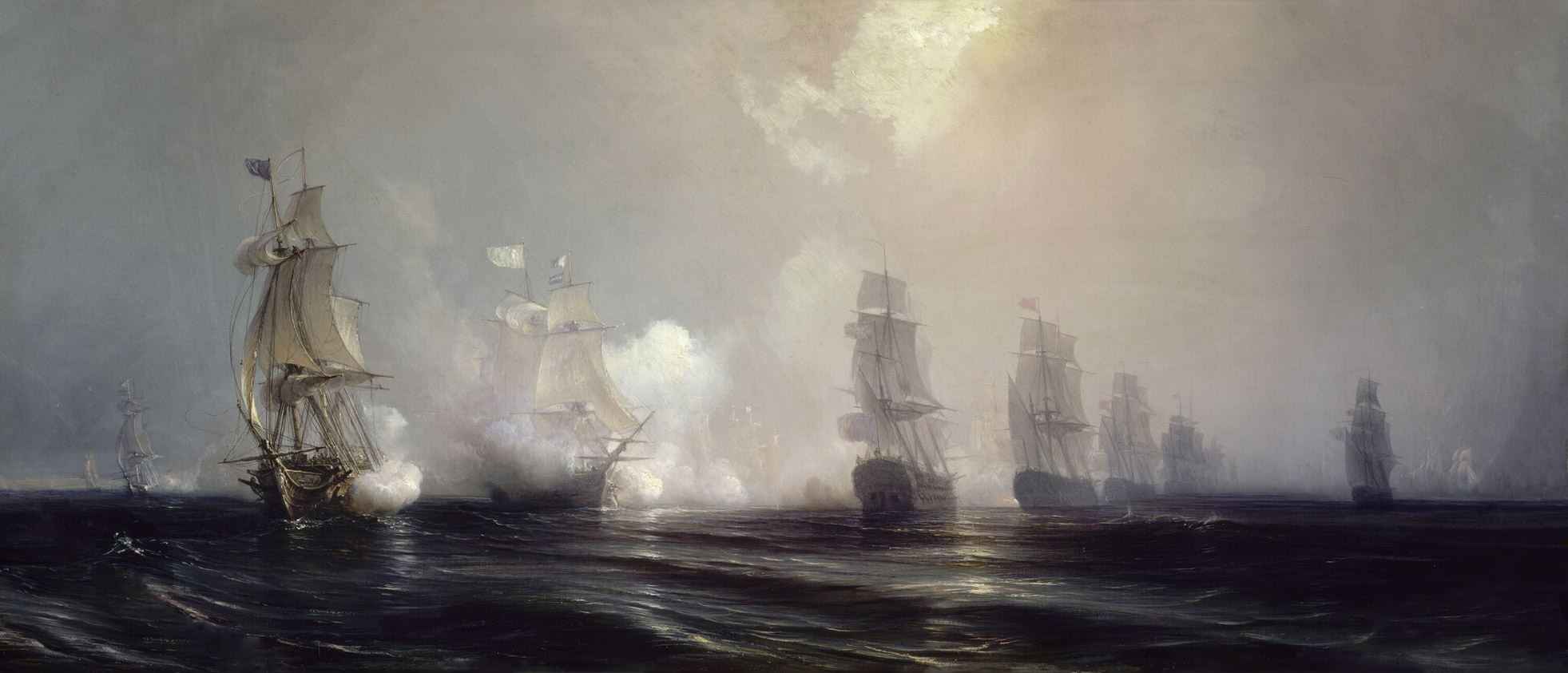
The 80-gun Auguste (1778) at the Battle of the Chesapeake.

== See also ==
- French ship Augusta
- Auguste (ship)
- HMS Augusta
- French ship Auguste Denise (1939), an armed trawler.
- French ship Auguste Leblond (1915), an armed trawler.
- French ship Auguste Normand (1915), a hired ship.
- French ship Augustine (1915), a hired ship.
