= Auguste (restaurant) =

Coordinates: 52°8′20.91″N 5°2′10.26″E

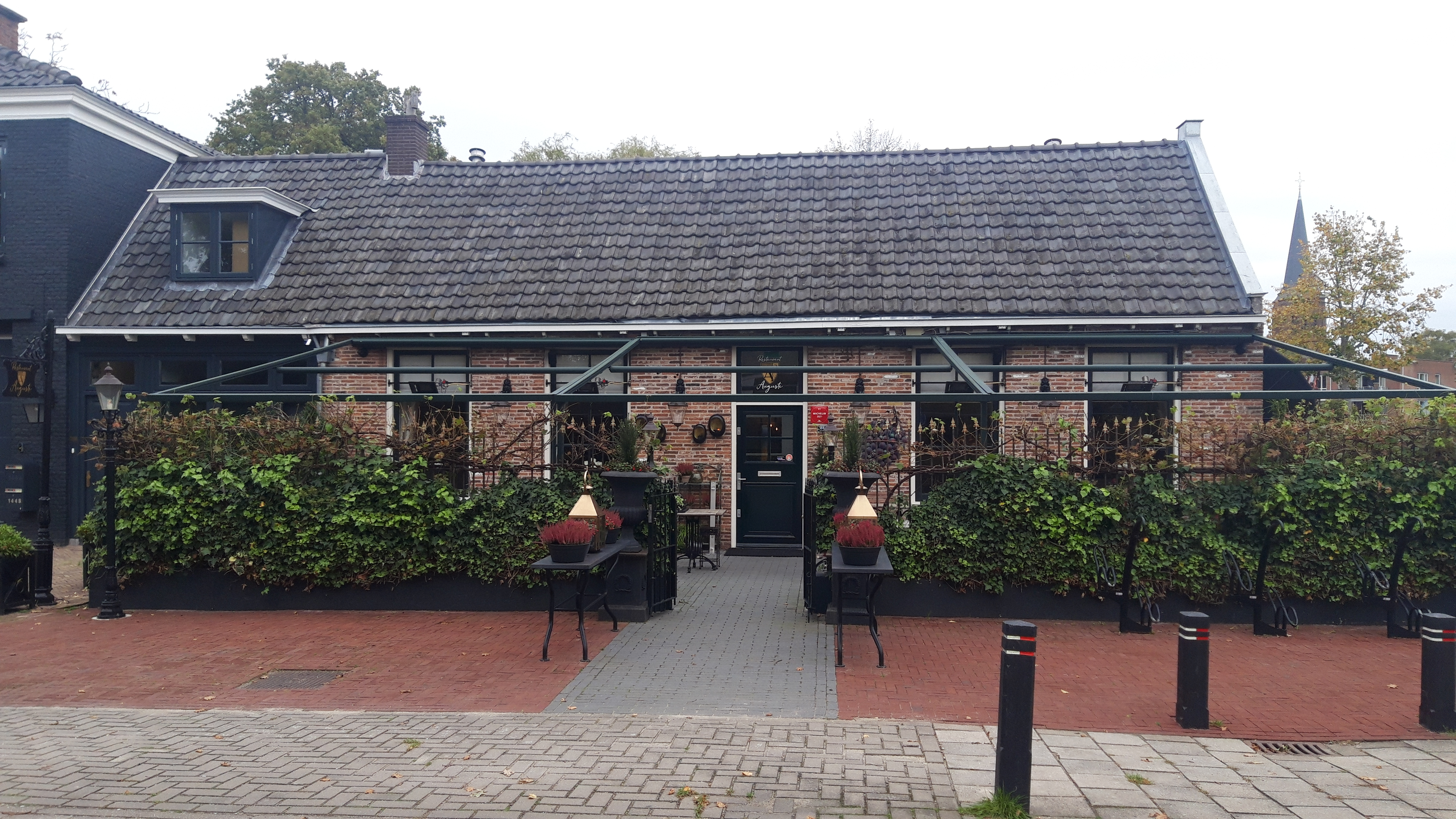
- The building in 2021
- Interactive map of Auguste

Restaurant information
- Established: 2008
- Head chef: Giulio Iadarola
- Rating: Michelin Guide
- Location: Straatweg 144, Maarssen, 3603 CS, Netherlands
- Website: Official website

Restaurant Auguste is a restaurant in Maarssen, Netherlands. It is a fine dining restaurant that was awarded one Michelin star in 2006 and retained that rating until 2008.

In 2013, GaultMillau awarded the restaurant 14 out of 20 points.

Head chef of Auguste is Giulio Iadarola. Head chef in the period of the Michelin star was Karl van Baggem, later owner and head chef of De Hoefslag.

Auguste was a member of the Alliance Gastronomique Néerlandaise in the period 2007–2008.

== See also ==
- List of Michelin starred restaurants in the Netherlands
