= Auguste Schepp =

German painter

- Born: 3 April 1846; Wiesbaden, Germany
- Died: 12 April 1905 (aged 59); Freiburg im Breisgau, Germany
- Known for: Painting

Auguste Schepp (1846–1905) was a German painter.

== Biography ==
Schepp was born on 3 April 1846 in Wiesbaden. She studied with Eugen Napoleon Neureuther in Munich and Karl Ferdinand Sohn in Düsseldorf. In 1892, Schepp settled in Munich and became a member of the Munich Secession. She exhibited her work during the Woman's Building at the 1893 World's Columbian Exposition in Chicago, Illinois.

Schepp died on 12 April 1905, in Freiburg im Breisgau.

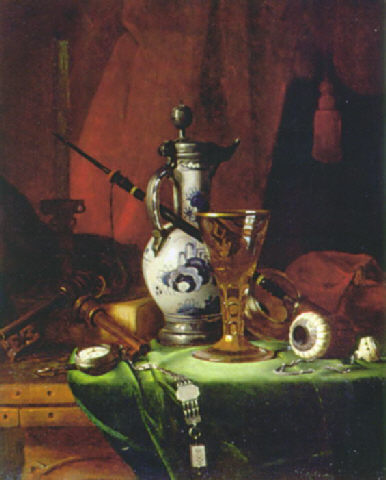
Stillleben mit Fayencekanne by Auguste Schepp
