= Stjernen (newspaper) =

Newspaper in Nebraska, United States

Stjernen (in English: The Star) was a Nebraskan newspaper published in the Danish language, founded in either 1884 or December 1885, and ran until 1896. At the time, it was the only newspaper in Danish in the state.

Published and edited by Peter Ebbesen (when he was between 24 and 26 years old), Stjernen was founded in St. Paul, Nebraska, before being moved to Dannebrog in 1886. It concerned itself primarily with the county of Howard, but there is evidence it circulated in other parts of the state, nearby states, and Denmark. Because many of its readers were farmers of Danish descent, agriculture and Danish affairs were central aspects of the paper. For farming, there were agronomical advertisements, deals reached between farm cooperatives and the paper, and pricing information for crops. And as for issues relating to Denmark, Stjernen published information relating to Jacob Brønnum Scavenius Estrup's ministry.

Due to a shortage of money, it had suspended operations in 1894, and after a fire, it closed two years later. According to Ebbesen, while there was demand for the paper to return following its closure, it would not return a profit, so he declined to revive it.
