= Stjernen (II) =

Norwegian motor launch

History

Norway
- Name: Stjernen
- Namesake: Stjernen I
- Owner: King of Norway
- Builder: Anker og Jensen
- Launched: 1935
- Acquired: 1945
- In service: 1945
- Identification: MMSI number: 257002000; Callsign: LBOM

General characteristics
- Length: 55 feet (17 m)
- Beam: 12 feet (3.7 m)
- Propulsion: 320 hp Volvo Penta motor
- Speed: 16 knots (18 mph; 30 km/h)
- Complement: 4 (1 officer, 3 sailors)

Stjernen (The Star) a 55-foot (17 m) motor launch owned by the King of Norway and used for short sea transport on official occasions. The pine-hulled boat was designed by Richard Gustav Furuholmen and built in 1935 by Anker og Jensen in Asker for merchant Nicolay Eger who named her Estrella. She was confiscated by the Germans during the German occupation of Norway and put at the disposal of Reichkommisar Josef Terboven.

King Haakon VII of Norway had been promised a royal yacht when he accepted the Norwegian throne in 1905, but this would not come through for many decades. In 1945 the Royal Court acquired Estrella as an interim measure, and named her Stjernen after the previous Stjernen I which had also been confiscated by the Germans but was returned as a wreck. In 1947 the King was gifted the HNoMY Norge as a proper royal yacht.

The present Stjernen is still in use by the King and his family and, like Norge, Stjernen is crewed by sailors from the Royal Norwegian Navy. The crew consists of three seamen and one junior officer who live aboard 14 days at a time. She was originally powered by a 75 hp Penta P62 but is now powered by a 320 hp Volvo Penta motor.

The nomenclature of the two Stjernens has evolved over time. From 1899 to 1940 the original Stjernen was named just Stjernen. In 1945 this boat was no longer operational and was no longer called Stjernen. This freed up the name for the present Stjernen which is also simply named Stjernen. When the old Stjernen was restored she was renamed Stjernen I and is also called Stjernen av 1899.

== Sources ==
- "A picture of the nameplate on the boat" (in Norwegian).
- "Article from Risør Wood boat festival" (in Norwegian).
- "Interview with the boat's commander on a classic motor boat forum" (in Norwegian).
- "Plans of the boat are available from the Norwegian Maritime Museum" (PDF) (in Norwegian).
- "A short biography on Furuholmen" (in Norwegian).
- "An article on a model of the boat" (in Norwegian). Archived from the original on November 13, 2011.
