= Georges Auguste =

Haitian painter

Georges Auguste (born 1933 in Petit-Goâve) is a Haitian painter. Auguste paints scenes of rural Haitian life in vibrant color. His style is known as "Raw Art".
