= Auguste Groß von Trockau =

German writer (1845–1915)

Auguste Johanna Freiin Groß von Trockau (born June 2, 1845, in Würzburg; died February 27, 1915), also known under her pseudonym Jutta Berthen, was a German writer.

== Life and work ==
Auguste Groß von Trockau was born as the scion of a Franconian noble family. She was the eldest daughter of Baron Friedrich Groß von Trockau, the holder of the Seniorat of the older line. The family lived in Würzburg (Dompfarrgasse 5), where Auguste Groß von Trockau spent almost her entire life. She received her education from tutors, French governesses and later in the advanced training class of a Würzburg educational institution. When her father married for the second time and the financial situation deteriorated, Auguste Groß von Trockau moved to Genoa for two years, where she worked as a governess in a family, among other things. Thanks to prebends that fell to her, she was able to return to her father's house. She later lived as a nun at Kanonissenstift St. Anna in Würzburg.

Auguste Groß von Trockau wrote mainly as a storyteller and playwright. From 1871, she wrote articles for various magazines. Her first work, Die Epen der Erlösung. Literary sketches. She subsequently published novellas, comedies and Christmas plays.

== Works ==
- Die Epen der Erlösung. Literary Sketch. Woerl, Würzburg 1877.
- Liebe und Leidenschaft. 1881.
- Tante Lisbeth. Benziger, Einsiedeln 1884.
- Ich heirate meine Tochter. Reclam, Leipzig 1885.
- Ein Nürnberger Kind. A portrait of life as a novel. Stahel, Würzburg 1889.
- Elepenor's marital bliss. A novella from the world of artists. Berlin 1892.
- Der Christbaum der Gnomen. E. Bloch, Berlin 1900.
- Der Zug der Krippe. E. Bloch, Berlin 1900.
- Das Schwesterlein. E. Bloch, Berlin 1900.

== Radio plays ==
- 1927: Ich heirate meine Tochter. Comedy in one act - Producer: NORAG. Director: Hans Freundt

=== Speakers ===
- Lotte Schloß: Baroness von Sassen
- Karl Pündter: Ottmar von Sassen
- Edith Scholz: Alke von Lassen
- Hans Freundt: Johann, Diener
