= Auguste Lechner =

Austrian writer

Auguste Lechner (2 January 1905, Innsbruck, Austria - 25 February 2000, Innsbruck, Austria) was an Austrian writer. Many of her works were aimed at an adolescent audience.

== Life ==
Born Auguste Neuner, Lechner studied languages at the University of Innsbruck. In 1927, she married the managing director of the Tyrolia publishing company, Hermann Lechner. Their son Hansjörg was born in 1930.

During the 1930s, she published folk stories in various magazines, and after the Second World War she began to write books for teenage readers, concentrating predominantly on retelling classical and medieval legends and myths. Her extremely wide range of adaptations drew from Ancient Greek and Roman myths (Hercules, the Iliad, the Odyssey, the Golden Fleece and the Aeneid) as well as (King Arthur, The Song of the Nibelungs, Roland and Parzival).

With estimated total sales of over a million, she was one of the most successful authors writing in German, and her books have been translated into Dutch, Bulgarian and Korean. Among the well-known artists who provided illustrations for her works were Hans Vonmetz, Maria Rehm, Josef Widmoser and Alfred Kunzenmann.

== Critical reception ==
At the time Lechner was writing, she won considerable praise for her blend of entertainment and education, her mastery of language, her sensitivity to the historical material and the suspense which characterized her works. There was admiration for her ability to make the myths and legends which form an important part of Western civilization accessible to young readers.

Some of the more recent criticism has claimed that she does not explore in sufficient depth the values, customs and perspectives of the period she describes, and that her main characters are stylized and simplified. Defenders of her work have pointed out that such criticism is unfair in that the myths and legends that she draws upon could also be criticised in this way.

== Awards ==
- 1956 Austrian State Prize for Young Literature
- 1978 Listed in the VII Premio Europeo di Letteratura Giovanile, Provincia di Trento
- 1983 Order of Merit of the State of Tyrol
- 1985 Honorary professorship
- 2005 The Song of the Nibelungs named as one of the Top Ten Books for Young People on International Children’s Book Day

== Works (selected) ==
- The Song of the Nibelungs, Told for Our Times, 1951
- The Adventures of Dietrich von Bern, 1953
- The Dolomite Sagas, 1955
- The Adventure of Parzifal, 1956
- The Brothers from the Cave – A Prehistoric Adventure, 1959
- The Tales of Odysseus, 1961
- The Story of Wild Hagen, Beautiful Hilde and Gudrun, 1963
- Aeneas, Son of the Goddess, 1967
- The Adventures of Don_Quixote, 1970
- The Saga of Roland, 1972
- de vier Heemskinderen.1972
- The Iliad: The Downfall of Troy, 1973
- The Finest Fables of La Fontaine, 1976
- Hercules: his Adventures for Young People, 1977
- The Saga of the Golden_Fleece, 1980
- The History of King Arthur, 1985
- Alexander the Great, 1995
