= Minion (cannon) =

Type of cannon

The minion (from the French mignon or "dainty") was a type of smoothbore cannon used during the Tudor period and into the late 17th century. It was of a smaller bore diameter – typically 75 millimetres (3.0 in) – than larger cannons such as sakers and culverins, and usually fired round shot weighing 2.5 kilograms (5.5 lb).

== History ==
The minion constituted the main armament of the fast and maneuverable Elizabethan-era galleons, such as Francis Drake's Golden Hind, along with the smaller falconet. The supply ships that accompanied the Spanish Armada had similar guns, but the larger ships of the Spanish treasure fleet bringing gold back from the New World carried heavier cannon such as the demi-culverin and demi-cannon, and relied on their size and weight in battle, as they were purpose-built warships rather than merchant ships pressed into service.

The Pilgrims brought a minion with them on the Mayflower, along with a saker and several smaller cannons. They later installed these in the fortified meeting-house that Myles Standish built to defend the town from the French and Spanish.

During the Age of Sail, minions were used to repel boarding parties, although larger-caliber guns such as carronades were becoming increasingly popular, due to their greater ability to disable enemy vessels. Minions remained in service as man-of-war quarterdeck guns until 1716 when George I appointed Albert Borgard to redesign the Royal Navy's artillery.

On land, the minion was used in the English Civil War as an anti-personnel weapon and was known as a "minion drake", derived either from the Latin draco (dragon) or from Sir Francis Drake.
