= Stjernen I =

Norwegian boat owned by King of Norway

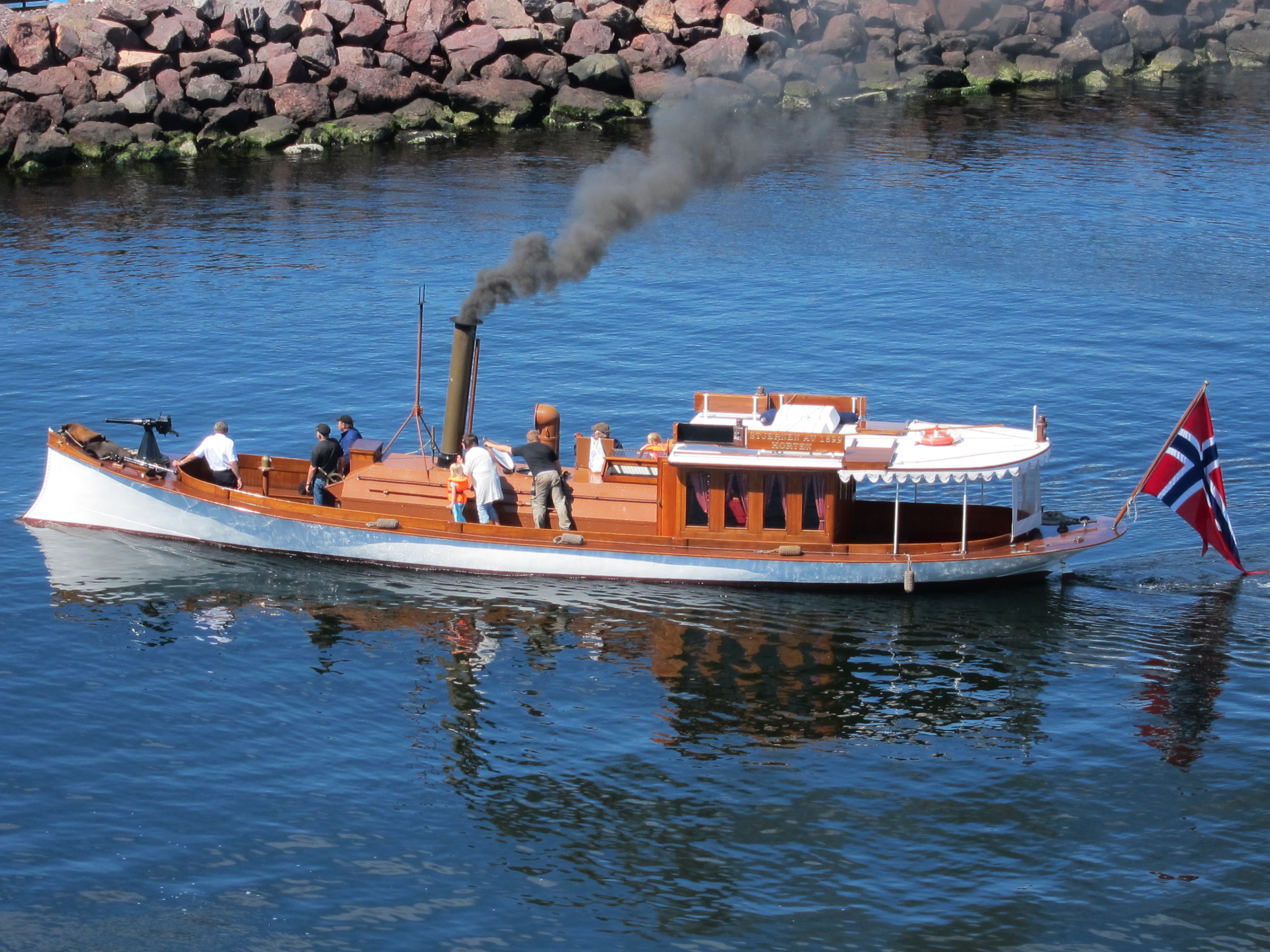
- Stjernen I in 2012

History

Norway
- Name: Stjernen
- Namesake: Stjernen (II)
- Owner: King of Norway
- Builder: Akers Mekaniske Verksted
- Launched: 1899
- Acquired: 1899
- In service: 1899-1940
- Status: Restored and operational

Nazi Germany
- Name: Unknown
- In service: 1940-1945

General characteristics
- Displacement: 11 tons
- Length: 17 metres (56 ft)
- Beam: 3 metres (9.8 ft)
- Propulsion: steam engine

Kongesjaluppen (KSJ) Stjernen I (The Star I) is a 17 m (56 ft) motor launch formerly used by the King of Norway for short sea transport on official occasions. She was built by Akers Mekaniske Verksted in Oslo as build number 189 in 1899. Stjernen I was in royal service from 1899 until the German invasion of Norway in 1940. In German service for the duration of the war, she had been totally gutted and was eventually sold.

Stjernen I was rediscovered by enthusiasts and restored during the 1990s and early 2000s. She was relaunched in 2001 and is currently owned by the foundation created for her preservation. She has since been used by the King on a few official occasions.

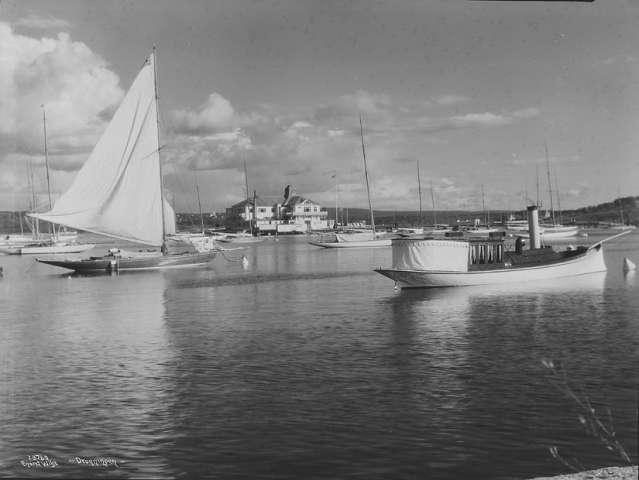
Stjernen I (to the right) in Frognerkilen in 1923

The Royal Court acquired Stjernen II in 1945, which is still in regular use.
