= HDMS Kronprindsens Lystfregat =

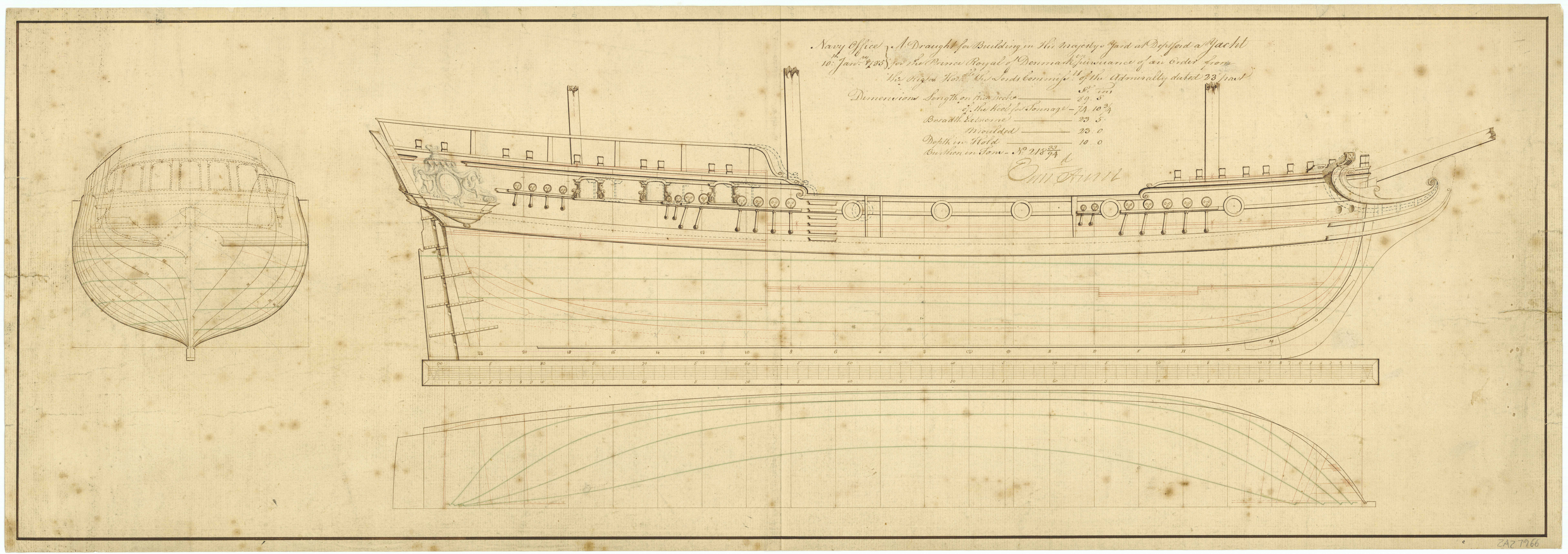
- The Prince of Denmark's Yacht (fl.1785)

History

Denmark-Norway
- Name: Kronprindsens Lystfregat ("Crown Prince's Pleasure Yacht")
- Builder: M/Shipwright Adam Hayes, Deptford Dockyard
- Laid down: March 1785
- Launched: 20 August 1785
- Acquired: By gift
- Commissioned: 4 October 1785 (sailed for Denmark)
- Fate: Given back to the British after the Battle of Copenhagen

United Kingdom
- Name: Prince Frederick
- Acquired: Gift from Denmark in 1807
- Renamed: HMS Princess Augusta in 1816
- Fate: Sold August 1818

General characteristics
- Class & type: Royal yacht
- Tons burthen: 218 (bm); 220 by calculation
- Length: 89 ft 5 in (27.25 m) (gundeck); 74 ft 10 1/4 in (22.816 m)(keel)
- Beam: 23 ft 6 in (7.16 m)
- Depth of hold: 10 ft 0 in (3.05 m)
- Complement: 59 officers and crew (Danish service)
- Armament: 10 × 4-pounder guns (Danish service)

HDMS Kronprindsens Lystfregat (literally, "the crown prince's pleasure frigate") was a sailing ship that served several roles, including as a royal yacht and as a British warship.

== Service ==
Commissioned to be a yacht, she was launched in Britain in September 1785. George III gave it to his nephew Frederick, the Crown Prince of Denmark, as a gift Kronprindsens Lystfregat cost £10,347 to build and furnish. The ship sailed to Copenhagen in October 1785 under Captain Seymour Finch and with an escort, HMS Myrmidon, and was then taken under Danish ownership and engaged as a royal yacht.

Then in 1807 Britain bombarded Copenhagen. After their victory, the British seized or burnt most of the Danish fleet, but made a conscious and conspicuous exception of Kronprindsens Lystfregat. In a gesture of contempt, the Danes crewed her with a contingent of 17 captured British sailors, placing one of them in command and sent her back to Britain in late 1807. Captain William Anderson, late of Hope, of Dundee, sailed the yacht Prince Frederick back to England. The Admiralty paid his expenses and gave him a present of 40 guineas.

The Royal Navy took her into service as the royal yacht, HMS Prince Frederick, succeeding a previous ship of that name - it is unclear whether in the yacht's case this was after George's nephew, father or second son, all called Frederick. On 25 July 1816 the Admiralty registered her as a third rate and renamed the yacht HMS Princess Augusta after Augusta, George's second daughter. (Note: Re-rating Princess Augusta as a third rate meant her commander would be a post captain. This in turn gave the Royal Navy a post that it could offer to senior captains as a sinecure.) Captain Thomas Hardy commanded Prince Frederick/Princess Augusta for three years prior to her sale.

The Admiralty put her and her predecessor, also named Princess Augusta, up for sale and sold her to Thomas Pittman on 13 August 1818 for £500. It is not clear that she got much use, either in Denmark or the United Kingdom.
