= HMS Auguste =

Ship of the line of the Royal Navy

History

France
- Name: L'Auguste
- Ordered: 2 January 1704
- Builder: Étienne Hubac, Brest
- Laid down: January 1704
- Launched: 3 May 1704
- Commissioned: July 1704
- In service: 1704–1705
- Captured: 8 August 1705

General characteristics in French service
- Class & type: 60-gun Third Rank ship of the line
- Tons burthen: 800
- Length: Gun deck:137 French feet (Note: The pre-metric French foot or pied was 6.575% longer than the equivalent British unit of measurement.); Keel:115 French feet
- Beam: 36½ French feet
- Draught: 18 French feet
- Depth of hold: 16 French feet
- Sail plan: Full-rigged ship
- Complement: 400 (320 in peacetime), + 10 officers
- Armament: 54 guns comprising: Gun deck: 24 × 18-pounders; Upper deck: 26 × 8-pounders; Quarterdeck: 4 × 4-pounders; Forecastle nil

Great Britain
- Name: HMS Auguste
- Acquired: 8 August 1705
- Commissioned: 28 August 1705
- In service: 1705–1716
- Fate: Wrecked 10 November 1716

General characteristics in British service
- Class & type: 60-gun fourth-rate ship of the line
- Tons burthen: 9328/94 bm
- Length: 141 ft 6 in (43.1 m) (gun deck); 115 ft 2 in (35.1 m) (keel)
- Beam: 39 ft 0 in (11.9 m)
- Depth of hold: 16 ft 0 in (4.88 m)
- Sail plan: Full-rigged ship
- Complement: 365 (240 in peacetime)
- Armament: Gun deck: 24 × 24-pounder guns; Upper deck: 24 × 9-pounder guns; QD: 8 minions; Fc: 2 minions

HMS Auguste was the French 54-gun Auguste built in Brest in 1704 that the British captured in 1705. In her brief French service she captured two British men-of-war. She was wrecked in 1716.

== French service ==
Étienne Hubac designed Auguste as a privateer for René Duguay-Trouin. in whose service she was employed as part of a naval squadron of four vessels. Together with the 54-gun Jason (1704), she captured HMS Coventry in September 1704. Then, on 12 November, 30 miles south of the Isles of Scilly, together with Jason and the 26-gun frigate Valeur (1704), she captured the third rate Elizabeth. In February 1705 Auguste and the 44-gun fourth-rate Thétis were escorting Gloutonne, Élephant, and Jean et Jacques (which were armed en flute), when the convoy ran into a squadron under Admiral George Byng off Cape Finisterre. Only Auguste escaped.

Chatham, together with Medway and Tryton, captured Auguste on 8 August 1705 (Old Style Calendar) - 19 August (New Calendar).

== British service ==
Auguste was registered for Royal Navy service from 28 August 1705 and fitted out for service in the English Channel. Commissioned for active service by Captain Robert Bokenham, she proved her worth by capturing the French privateers La Marie-Madeleine on 13 September 1706, and L'Hirondelle on 30 September 1706.

Bokenham died in 1707 and Captain Thomas Scott replaced him. The next year, Auguste joined the fleet of Admiral George Byng, which was in need of reinforcement after the Scilly naval disaster of 1707. The fleet patrolled the Channel and the North Sea throughout 1708. In 1709, Lord Duffus replaced Scott. From 1710 to 1713, she was under the command of Captain Robert Thompson in the Dunkirk squadron (1710), the Mediterranean (1711), and the West Indies (1712).

== Loss ==
In 1716, while under the command of Captain Robert Johnson, Auguste was in the Baltic. She had sailed from Nore on 18 May with a squadron under Sir John Norris to join a combined English-Dutch-Danish-Russian fleet in a demonstration to Sweden that Britain and her allies would resist Swedish interference with trade.

In November she was returning to England from Copenhagen with a convoy. As the weather worsened, the convoy took shelter on the evening of 9 November at Læsø island. During the night Auguste's cables broke and she sailed out to sea to avoid being driven on shore. On the night of 10 November a gale drove her ashore on the nearby island of Anholt. Captain Johnson, his officers, and at least 250 of his men were saved. Another 40 may have landed in Sweden. In all, most of her people were saved.

== See also ==
- List of ships captured in the 18th century
- Bibliography of 18th-19th century Royal Naval history
- List of early warships of the English navy
