= Augustus I =

Augustus I may refer to:

- Augustus, Elector of Saxony (1526–1586)
- Augustus I, Duke of Brunswick-Lüneburg (1568–1636)
- Augustus, Grand Duke of Oldenburg (1783–1853)
- Sigismund II Augustus (1520–1572), King "Augustus I" of Poland and Grand Duke of Lithuania
- Auguste I Blanchard (c. 1766–c. 1835), French engraver

== See also ==
- Frederick Augustus (disambiguation)
- Ernest August
