= August (disambiguation) =

August is the eighth month of the year.

August may also refer to:

== People ==
- August (name), including lists of people with the given name or surname

== Culture ==
=== Film and television ===
- August (1996 film), an adaptation of Anton Chekhov's play Uncle Vanya directed by and starring Anthony Hopkins
- August (2008 film), starring Josh Hartnett and Naomie Harris
- August (2011 film), starring Murray Bartlett
- "August" (Fringe episode), a 2009 episode of the television series Fringe
- August (Fringe character)
- the title character of Dan August, a 1970-71 American television series
- August Booth, a character in the American television series Once Upon a Time
- August: Osage County (film), a 2013 film (based on the 2007 play) starring Meryl Streep, Dermot Mulroney, and Julia Roberts

=== Literature and publications ===
- "August", a poem by John Updike
- August (Rossner novel), a 1983 novel by Judith Rossner
- August (Woodward novel), a 2001 novel by Gerard Woodward
- August: Osage County, a 2007 Pulitzer Prize-winning play by Tracy Letts

=== Music ===
- August (band), a Thai boy band
- The August, an American country rock band
- August Hall, music venue in San Francisco

==== Albums ====
- August (album), a 1986 album by Eric Clapton
- August, a 2005 album by Elevator (band)
- August, a 2019 album by Shannon Lay

==== Songs ====
- "August" (song), a 2020 song by Taylor Swift
- "August", by Love from the album Four Sail, 1969
- "August", by Avail from the album Over the James, 1998
- "August", by Rilo Kiley from the album Take Offs and Landings, 2001

== Other uses ==
- August, California, a census-designated place in San Joaquin County, California, United States
- August Home, a home automation company known for door locks

== See also ==
- Auguste (disambiguation)
- Agosto (disambiguation)
- Augustus (disambiguation)
- Augusta (disambiguation)
- Augusts (given name)
- Augst, municipality in the canton of Basel-Landschaft, Switzerland
