= Frederick Augustus =

Frederick Augustus (German: Friedrich August), may refer to:

- Frederick I, Holy Roman Emperor (1122–90), better known as Frederick Barbarossa
- Frederick Augustus, Duke of Württemberg-Neuenstadt (1654–1716)
- Friedrich August of Hanover, Prince (1661-1690), younger brother of King George I of Great Britain
- Frederick Augustus I, Elector of Saxony (1670–1733), better known as King Frederick August II of Poland
- Frederick Augustus II, Elector of Saxony (1696–1763) better known as King August III of Poland
- Frederick Augustus I, Duke of Oldenburg (1711–1785)
- Frederick Augustus, Prince of Anhalt-Zerbst (1734–93)
- Frederick Augustus, Duke of Nassau (1738–1816)
- Frederick Augustus, Prince of Brunswick-Wolfenbüttel-Oels (1740–1805)
- Frederick Augustus III, Elector of Saxony (1750–1827), who then became King Frederick Augustus I of Saxony
- Frederick Augustus, Count of Erbach-Fürstenau (1754–1784)
- Prince Frederick, Duke of York and Albany (1763–1827), son of George III of the United Kingdom
- Frederick Augustus II of Saxony (1797–1854)
- Frederick Augustus II, Grand Duke of Oldenburg (1852–1931)
- Frederick Augustus III of Saxony (1865–1932), last king of Saxony

== See also ==
- Augustus (disambiguation)
- Ernest August
