= Hunter Street (Hamilton, Ontario) =

Lower City collector road in Hamilton, Ontario, Canada

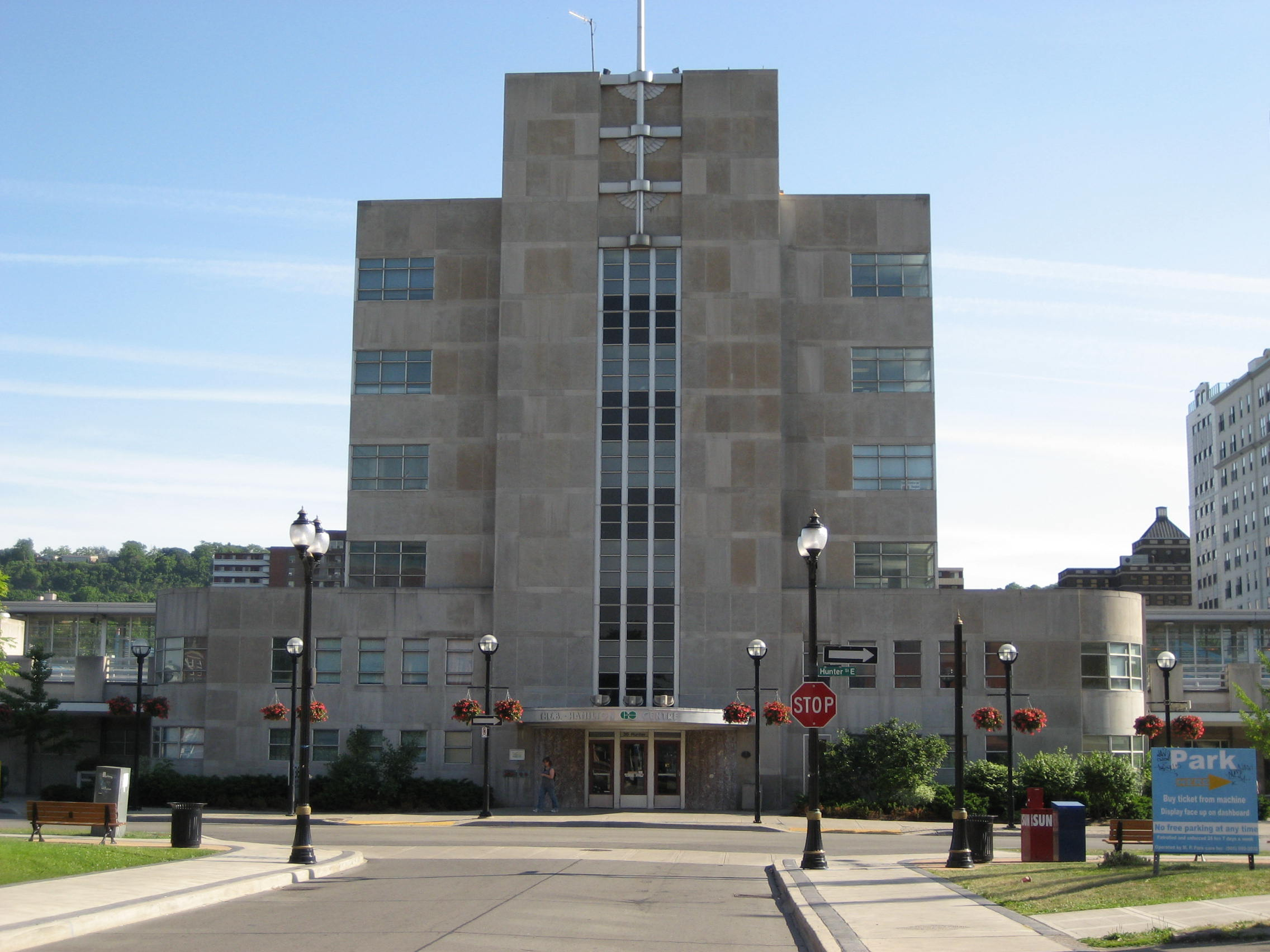
Hamilton GO Transit station

Hunter Street is a Lower City collector road in Hamilton, Ontario, Canada. It is a one-way street (Westbound) that starts West of Locke Street at Hill Street Park and ends two blocks East of Victoria Avenue at Emerald Street. Hunter Street is a two-way street between Victoria and Emerald Streets.

== History ==
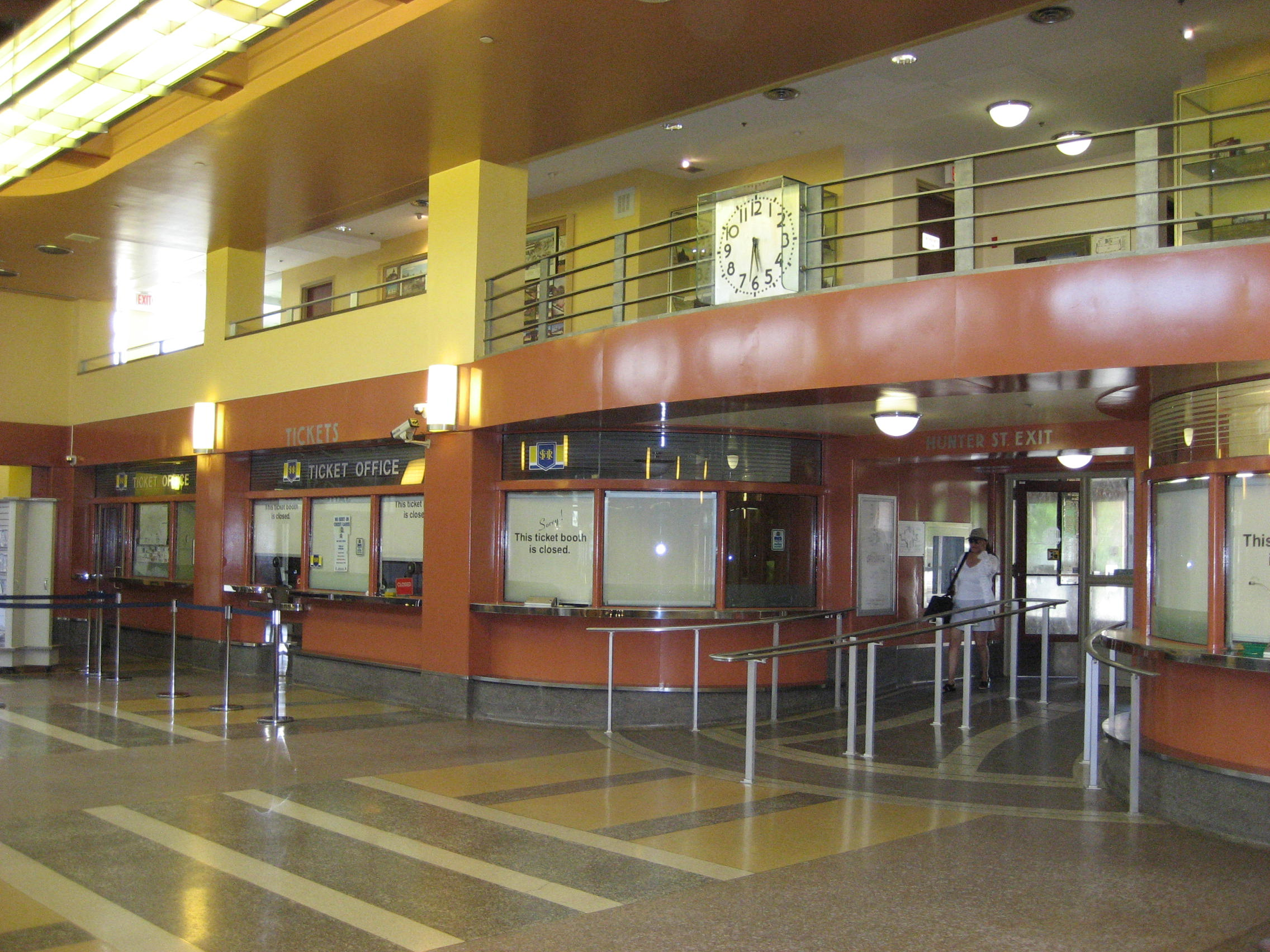
Hamilton GO Transit station, lobby area

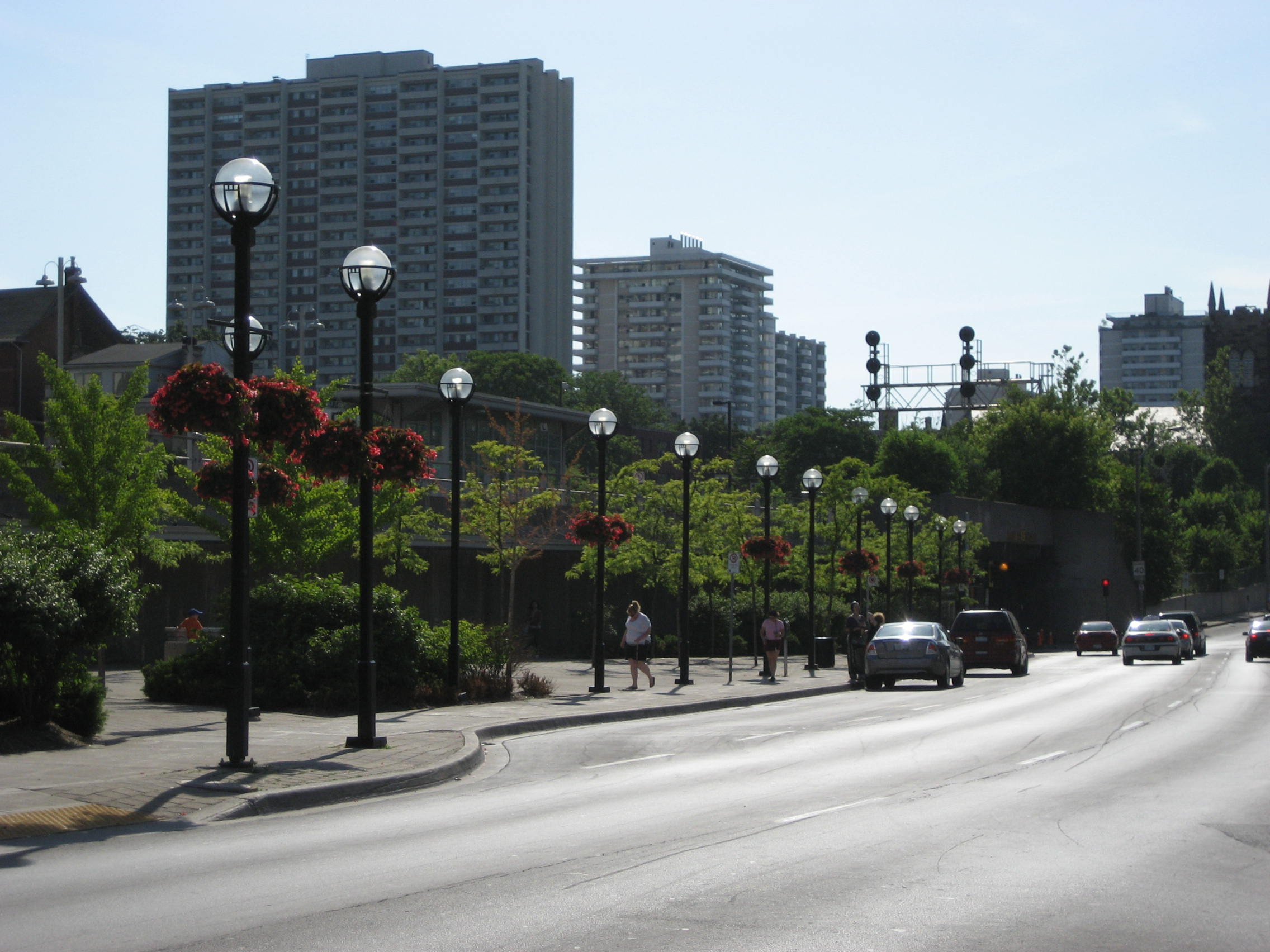
Hunter Street East, looking West

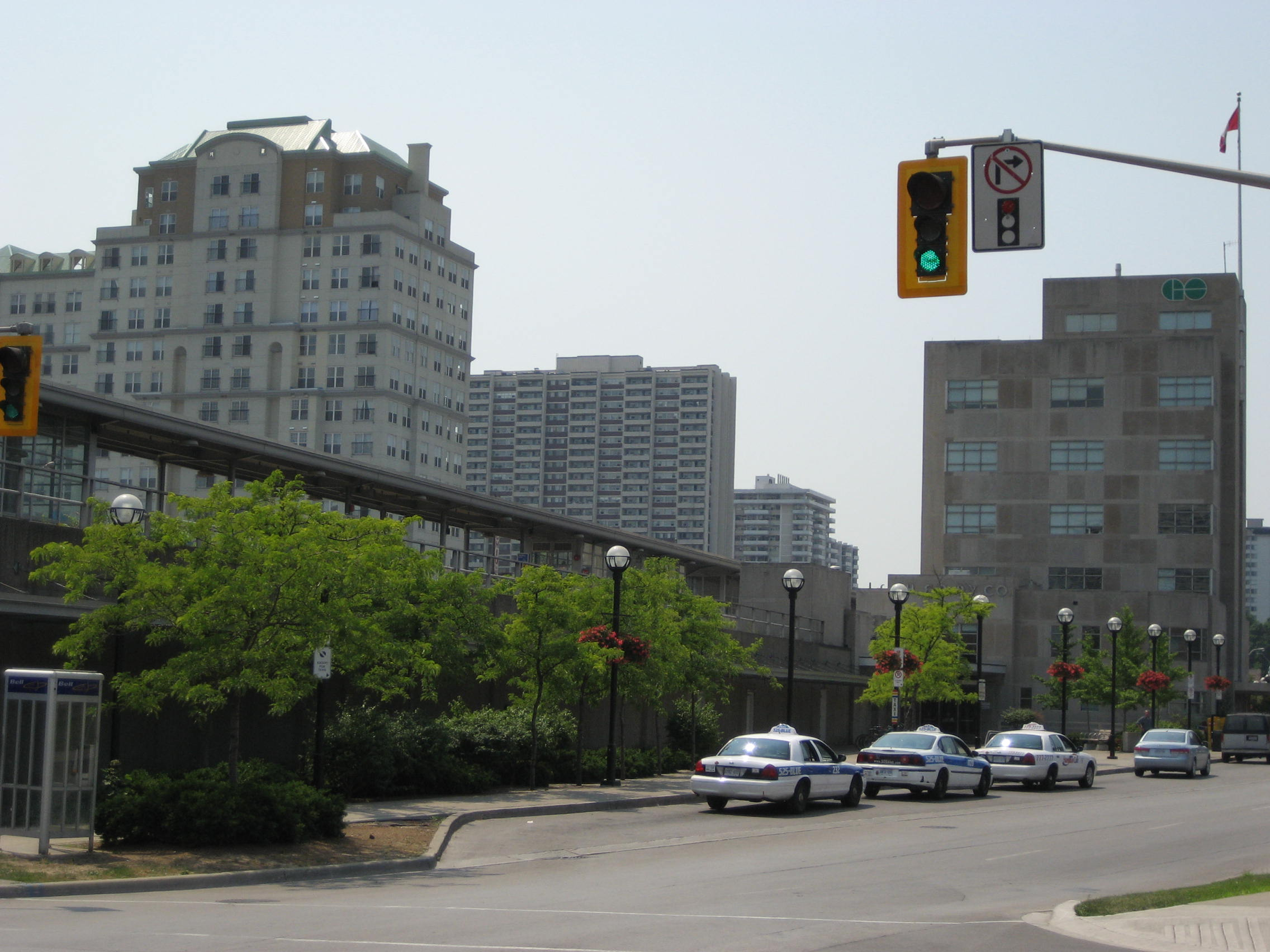
Hunter Street West, East of the Go Transit Station

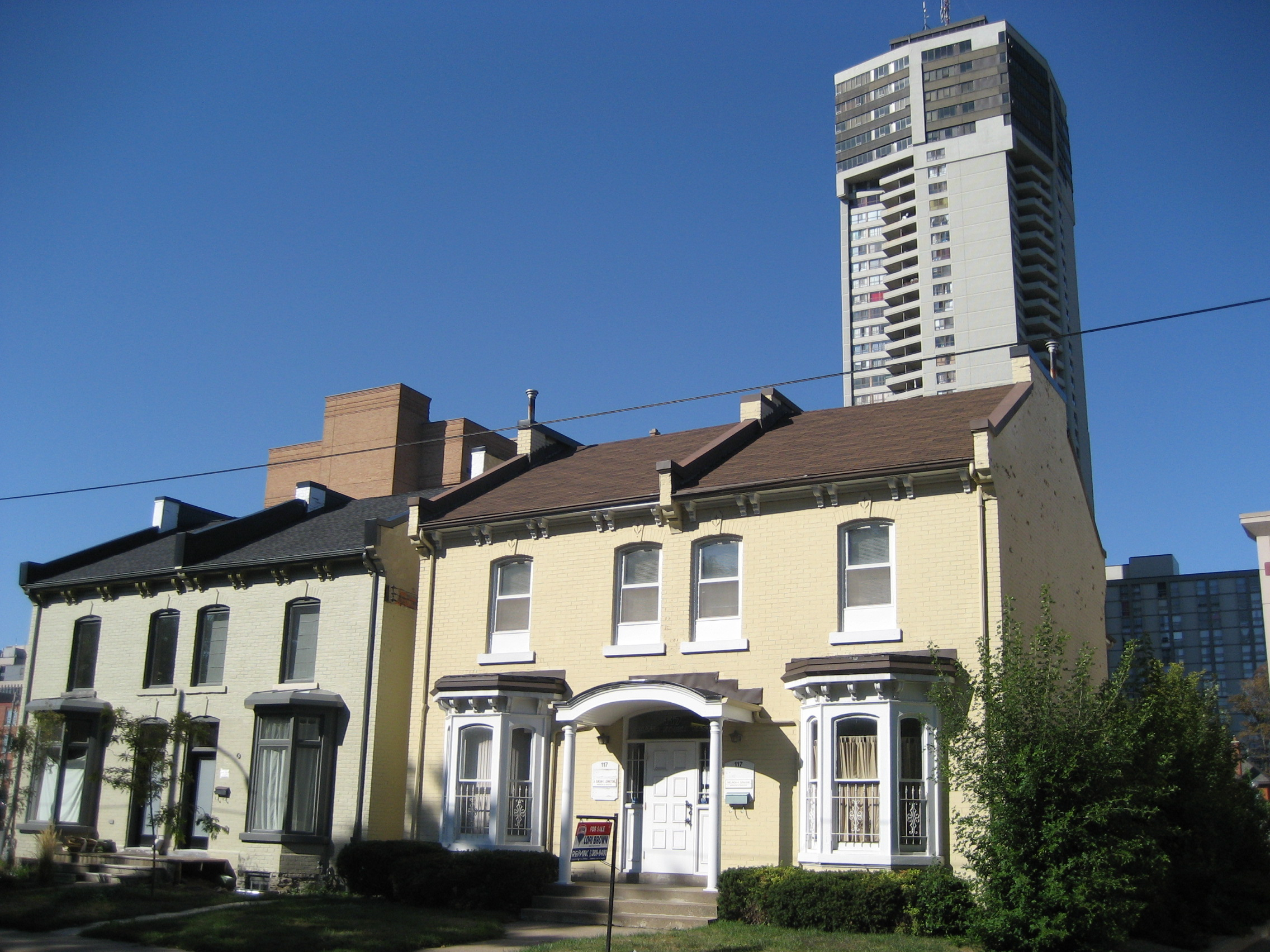
Hunter Street East

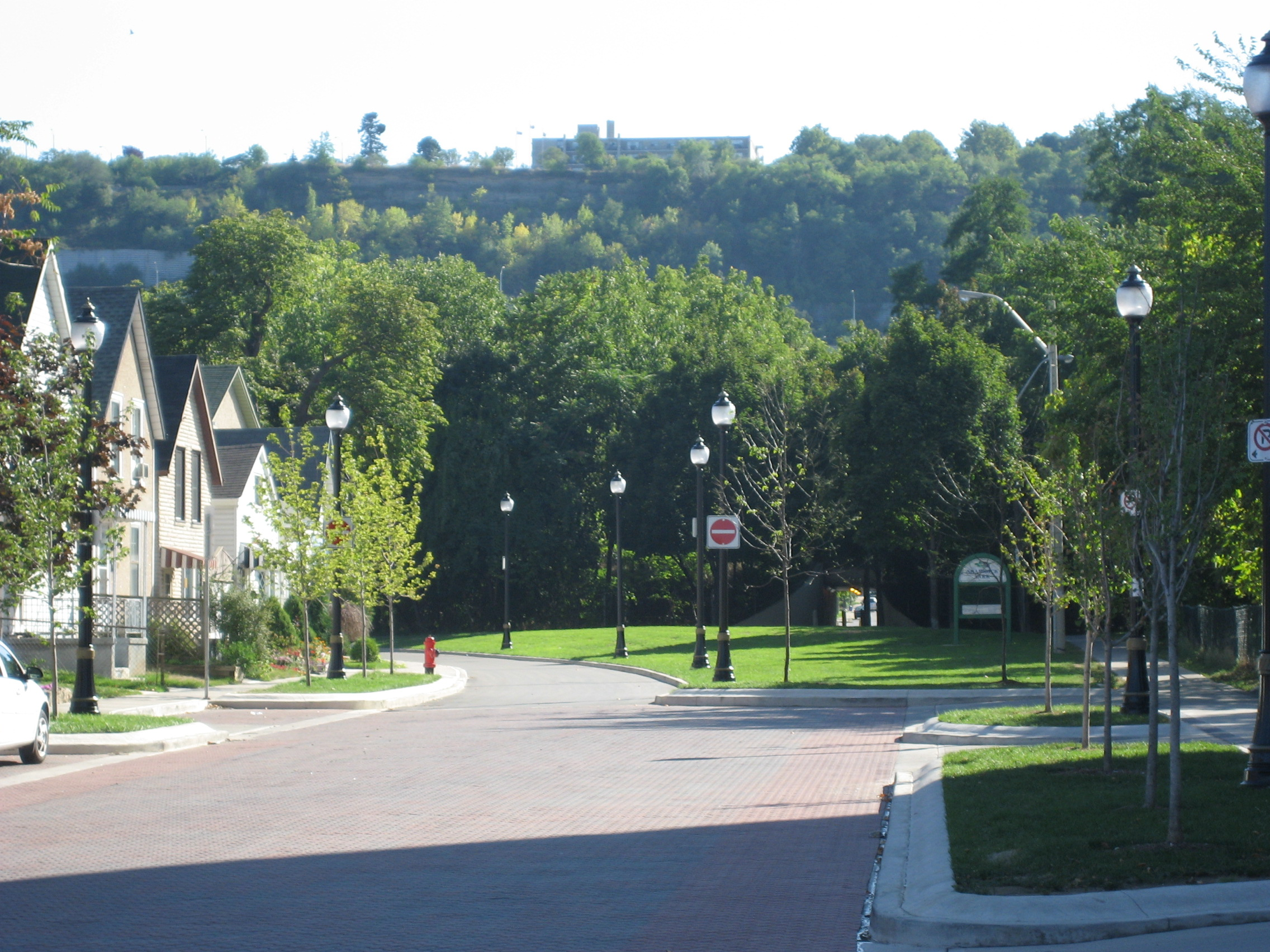
Corner of Hunter Street East & Ferguson, looking South

Hunter Street is named after Peter Hunter Hamilton (1800–1857), landowner and businessman and half brother of city founder George Hamilton. Originally, sections of Hunter Street were called William Street after King William IV and Peel Street after the British PM, Sir Robert Peel.

Central Public School building on Hunter Street West was built in 1853. This school was built to accommodate 1,000 students, was the largest graded school in Upper Canada, and became the only public school in Hamilton, at the time of its opening in 1853. The building's original final proportioned classical design, by the firm Cumberland & Ridout, was extensively remodelled in 1890 by the Hamilton architect, James Balfour. His alterations, including a steeply pitched roof, certain round arched windows and a heightened central tower, created an edifice in conformity with the late Victorian tastes. The building is designated under the Ontario Heritage Act.

== Landmarks ==
Note: Listing of landmarks from West to East.

- Hill Street Park
- Players' Guild of Hamilton, Inc. (theatre)
- Central Public School Building, w/ clock tower
- James Street South Shopping district
- Hamilton GO Transit station, Original site of the Toronto, Hamilton and Buffalo Railway (1892–1987)
- The Fontainebleu (18-storey apartment building)
- Access Community Church of God 7th Day
- Central Memorial Recreation Centre

== Communities ==
Note: Listing of neighbourhoods from West to East.

- Kirkendall
- Durand
- Corktown
- Stinson

== Roads that are parallel with Hunter Street ==
Lower City roads:

- Burlington Street, West–East
- Barton Street, West/East
- Cannon Street, West/East
- Wilson Street
- King William Street
- King Street, West/East
- Main Street, West/East; - Queenston Road
- Jackson Street, West/East
- Hunter Street, West/East
- Augusta Street
- Charlton Avenue, West/East
- Aberdeen Avenue

Niagara Escarpment (Mountain) Roads:

- Concession Street
- Queensdale Avenue West/ East
- Scenic Drive - Fennell Avenue, West/East
- Sanatorium Road
- Mohawk Road, West/East
- Limeridge Road West/East
- Lincoln M. Alexander Parkway - Mud Street, (Hamilton City Road 11)
- Stone Church Road, West/East
- ; Rymal Road, West/East
- Twenty Road

== Roads that cross Hunter Street ==
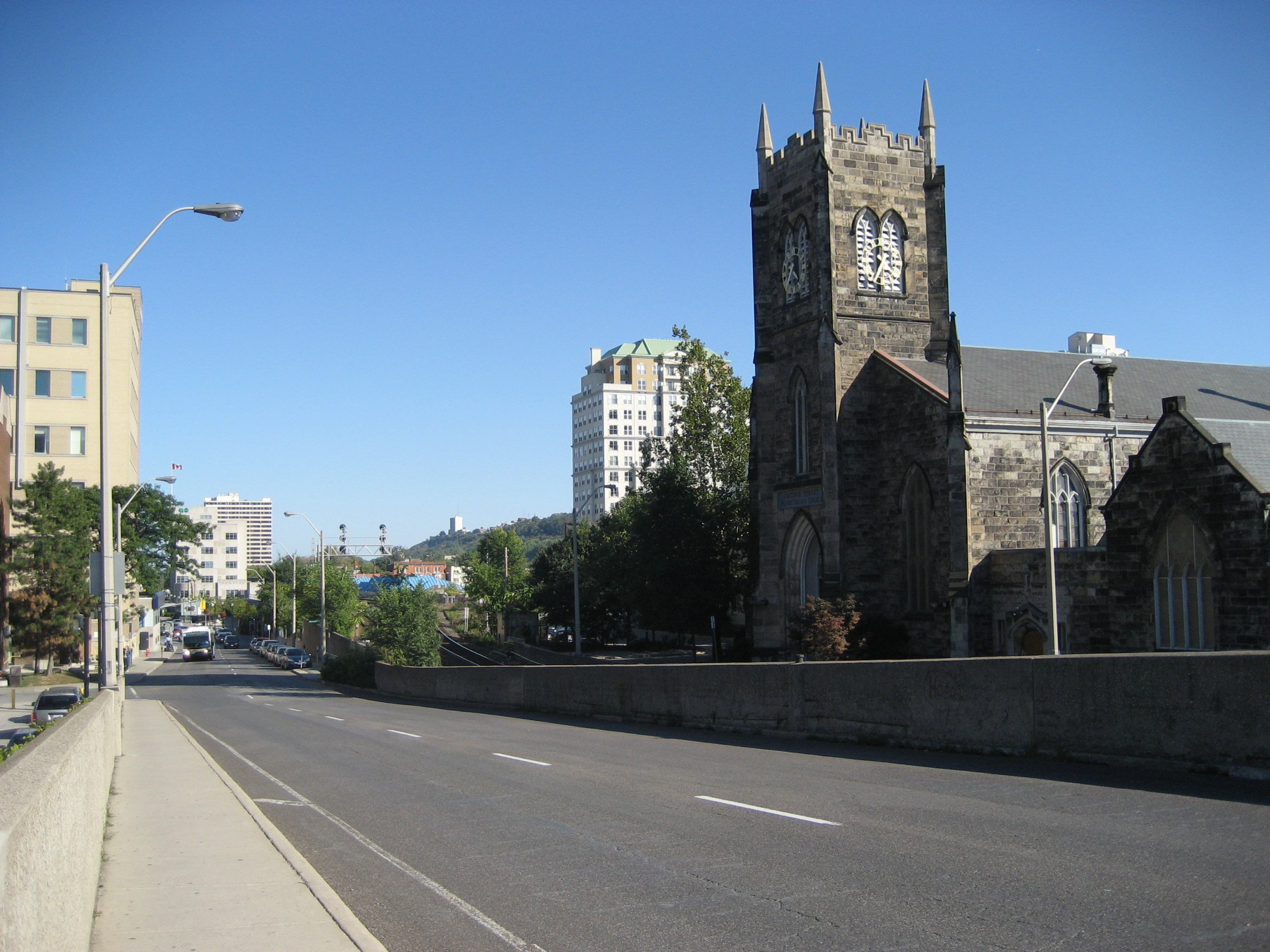
Hunter Street West, looking East

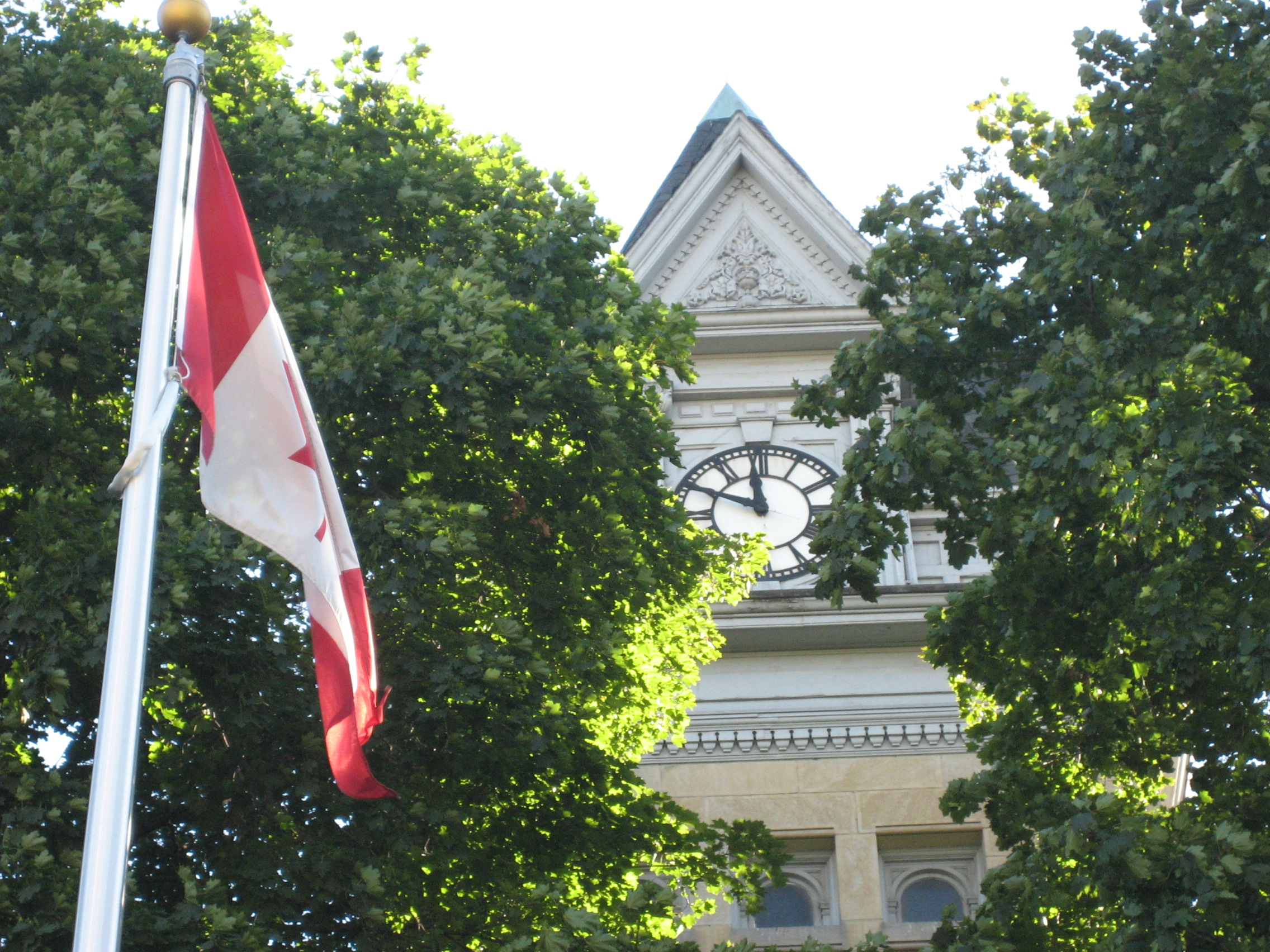
Central Public School building, Hunter Street West

Note: Listing of streets from West to East.

- Locke Street, South
- Queen Street, South
- Hess Street, South
- Caroline Street, South
- Bay Street, South
- MacNab Street, South
- James Street, South
- Hughson Street, South
- John Street, South
- Catharine Street, South
- Ferguson Avenue, South
- Wellington Street, South
- Victoria Avenue, South

== Images ==
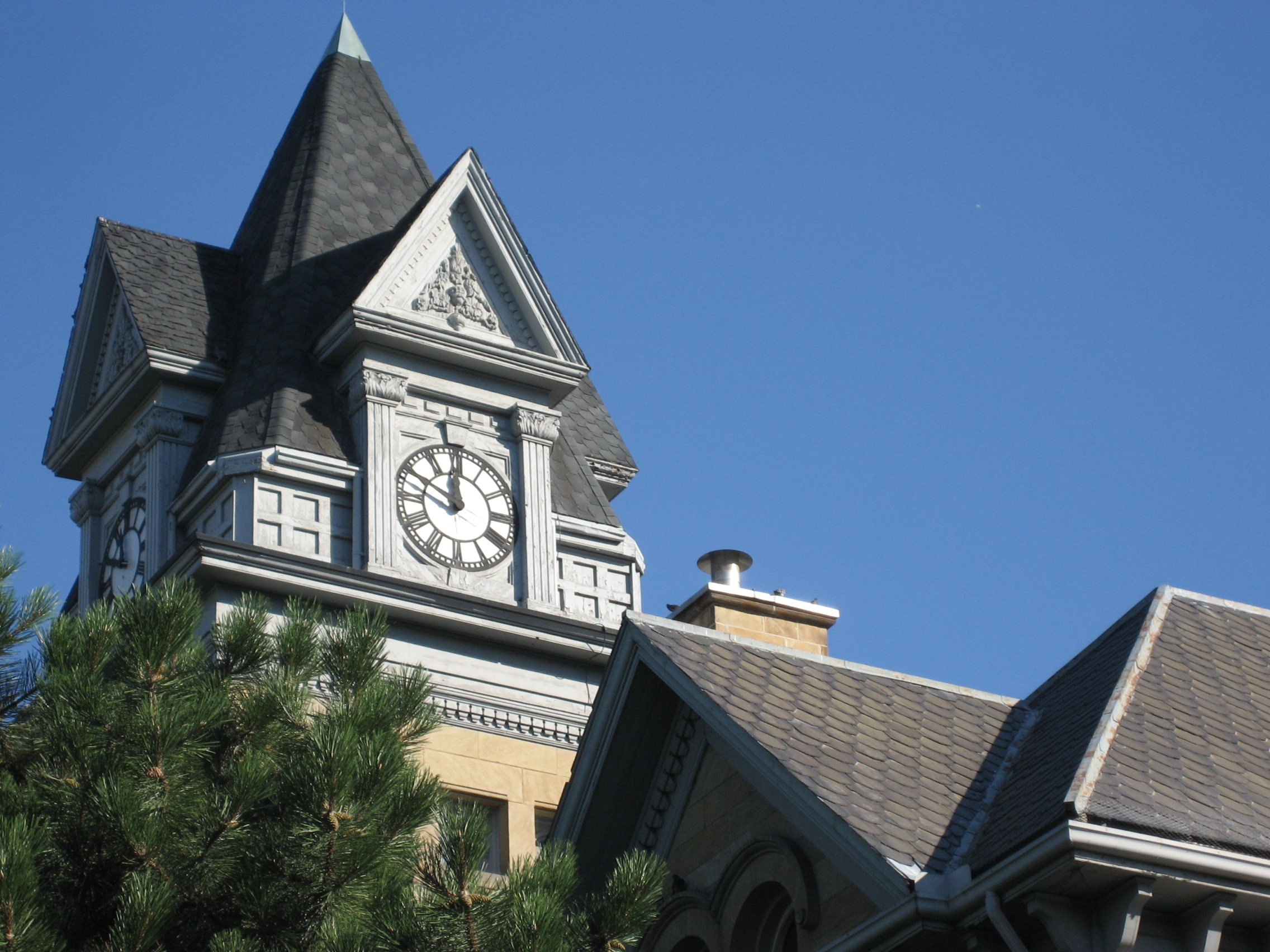
Central Public School building, Hunter Street West

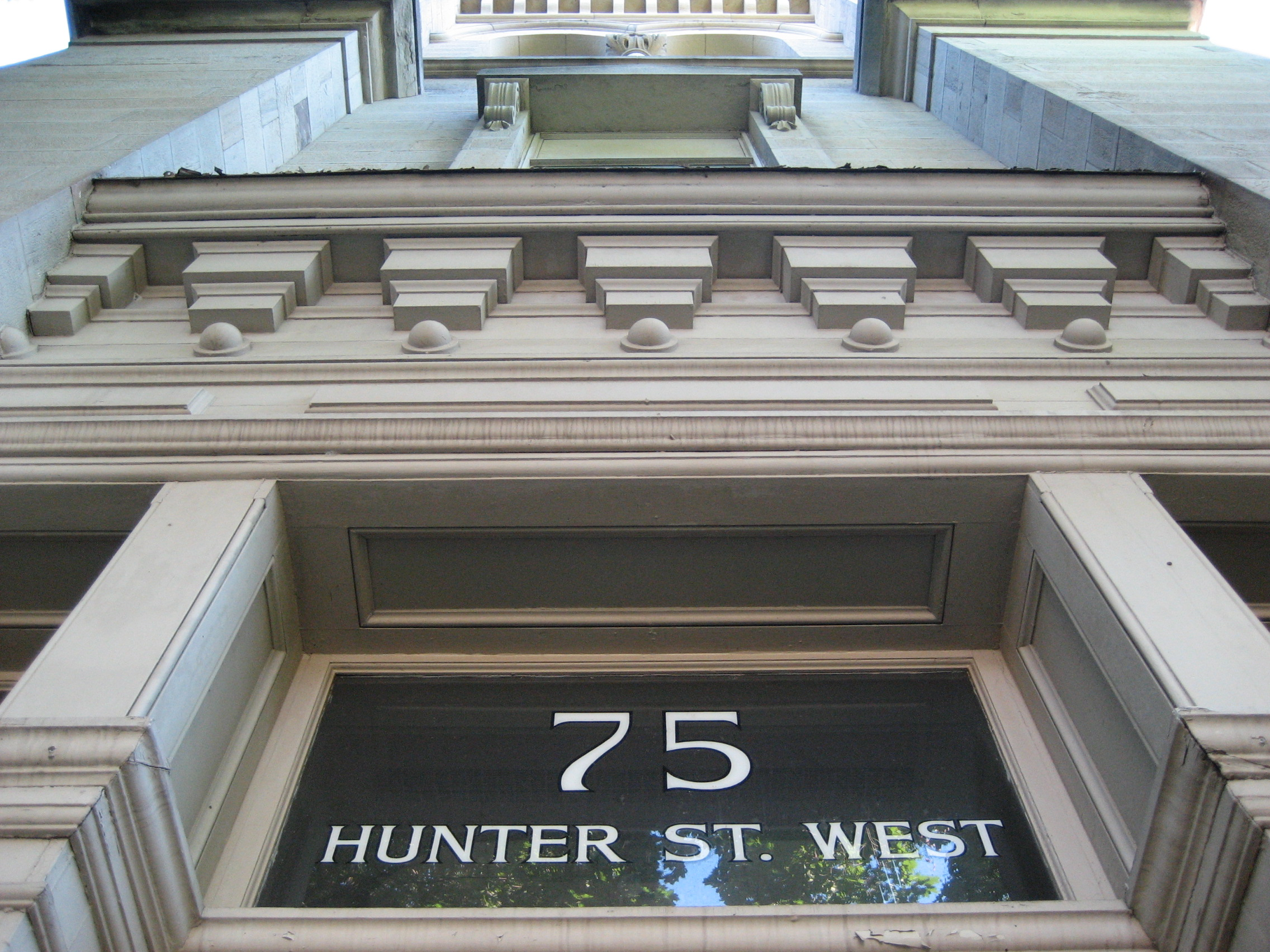
Central Public School building, Front Entrance, Hunter Street West

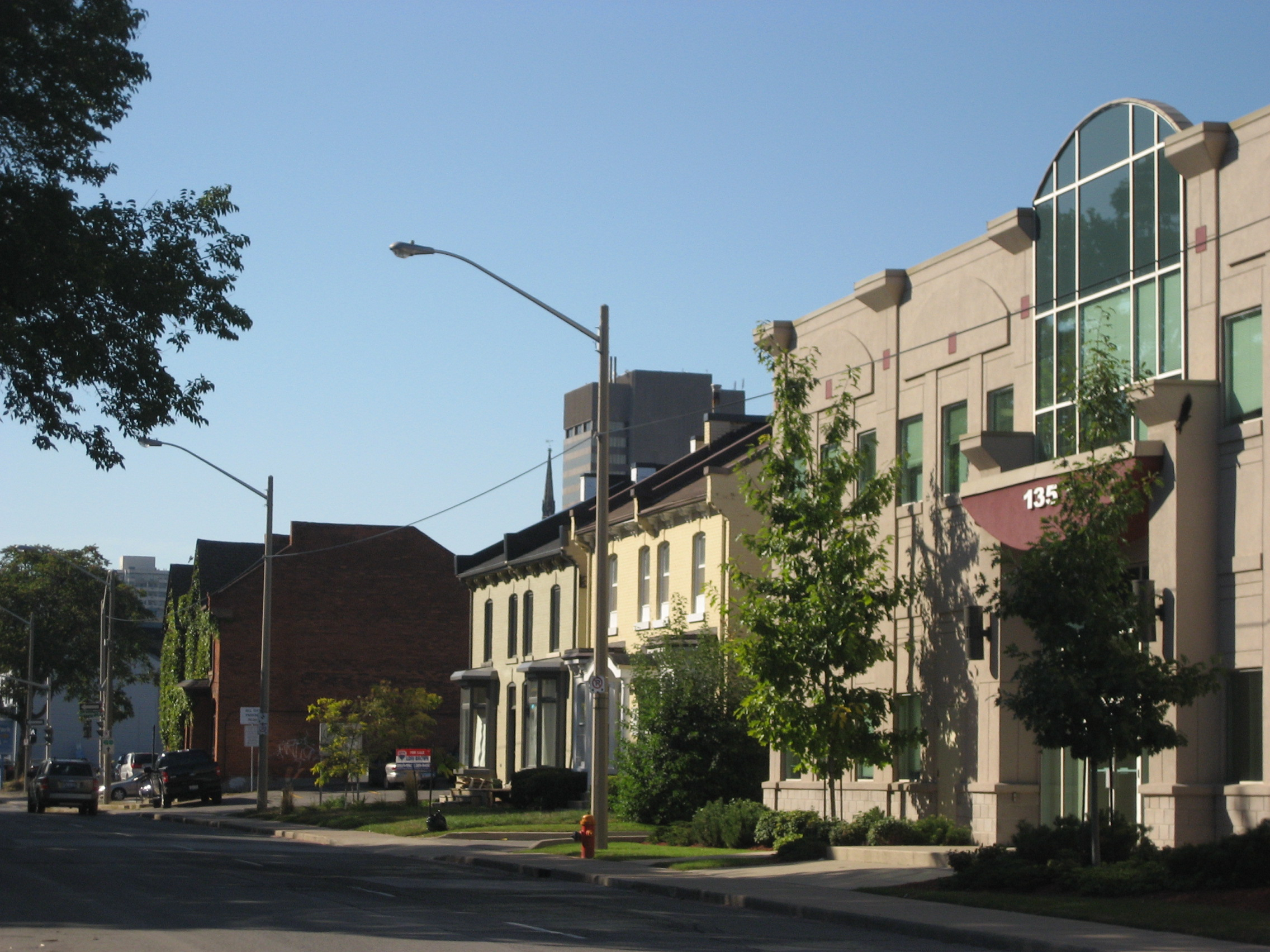
Hunter Street East

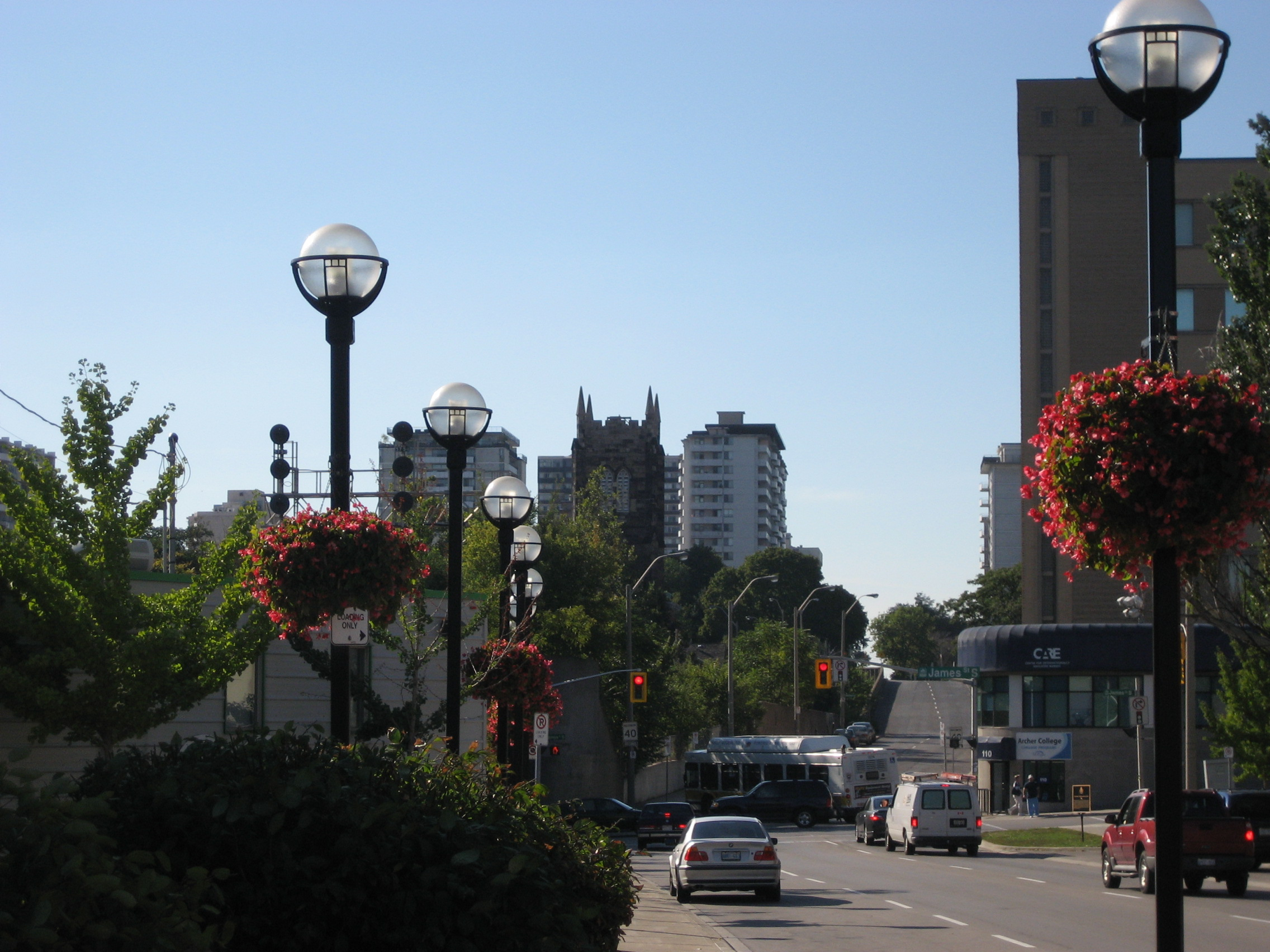
Hunter Street East, looking West

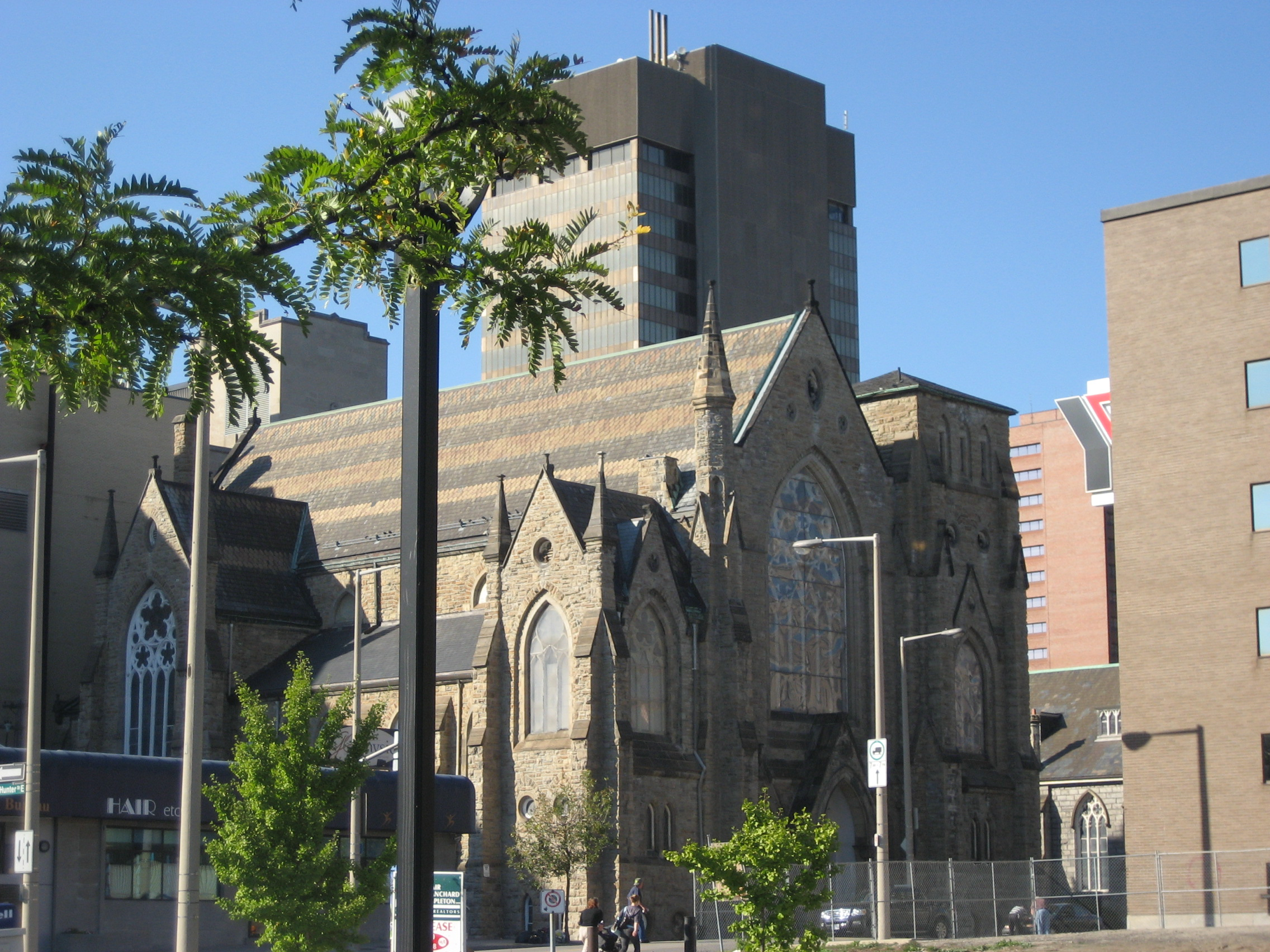
Corner of Hunter and James Streets

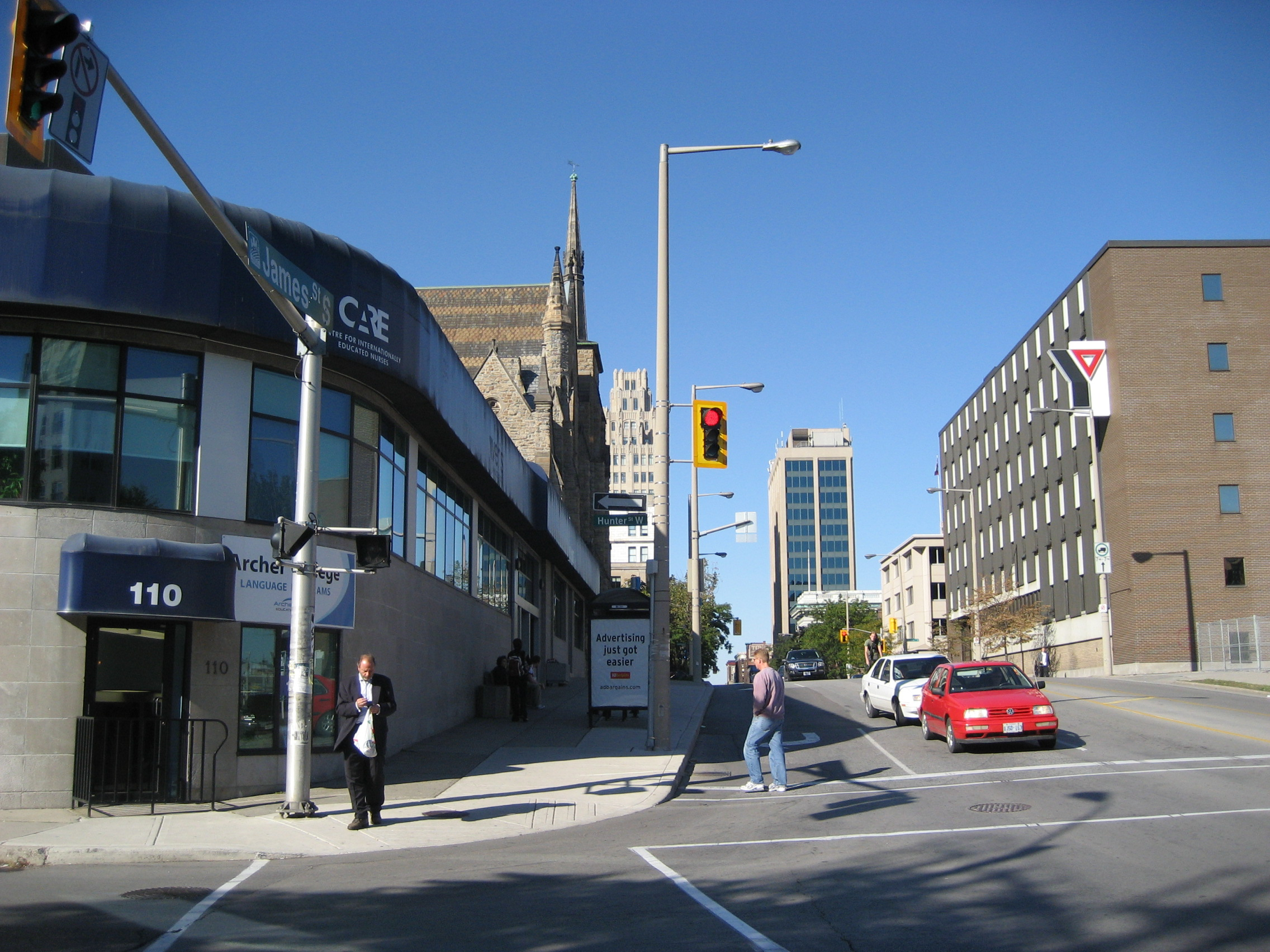
Corner of Hunter and James Streets

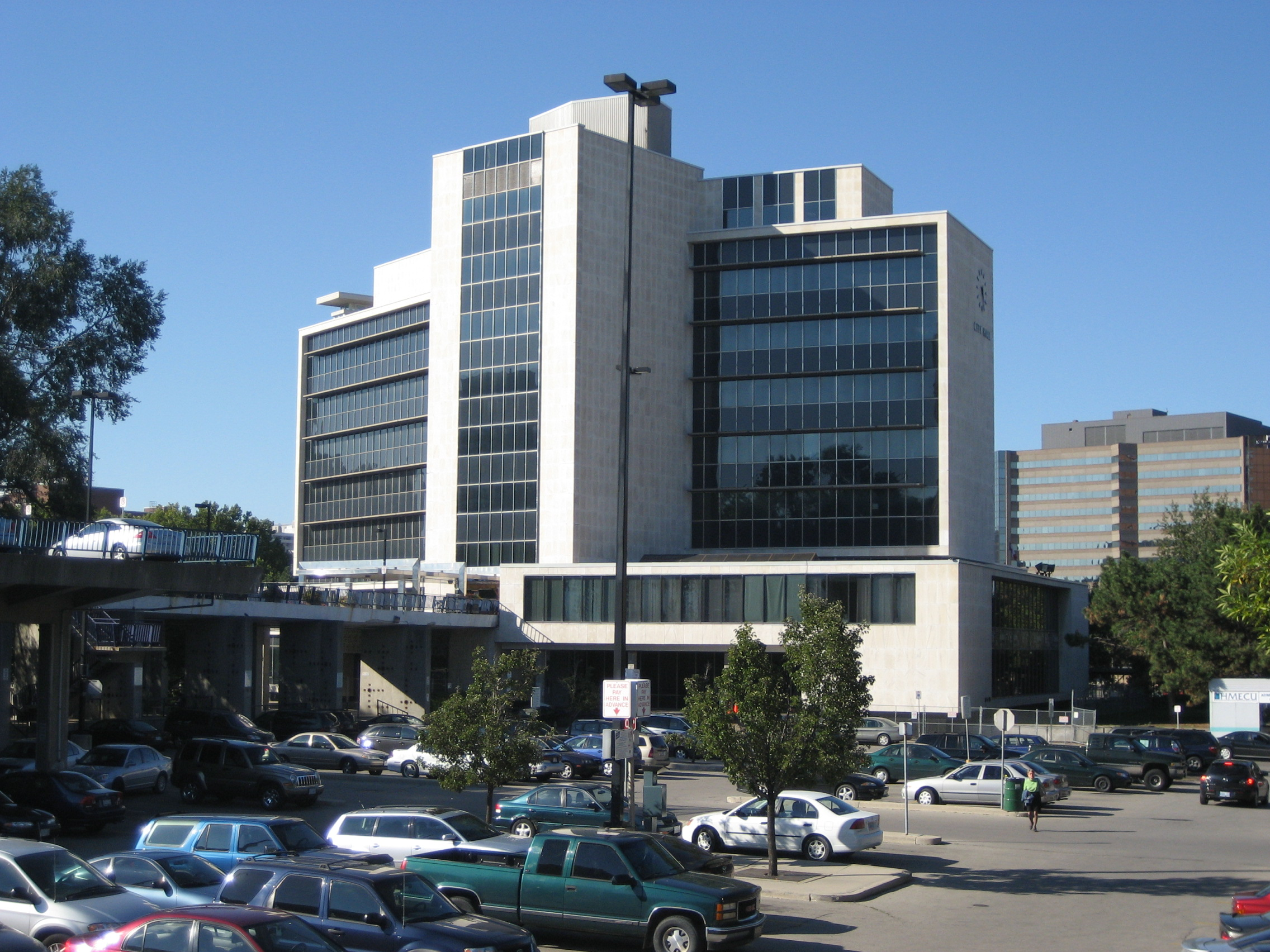
Back of City Hall, View from Hunter Street West

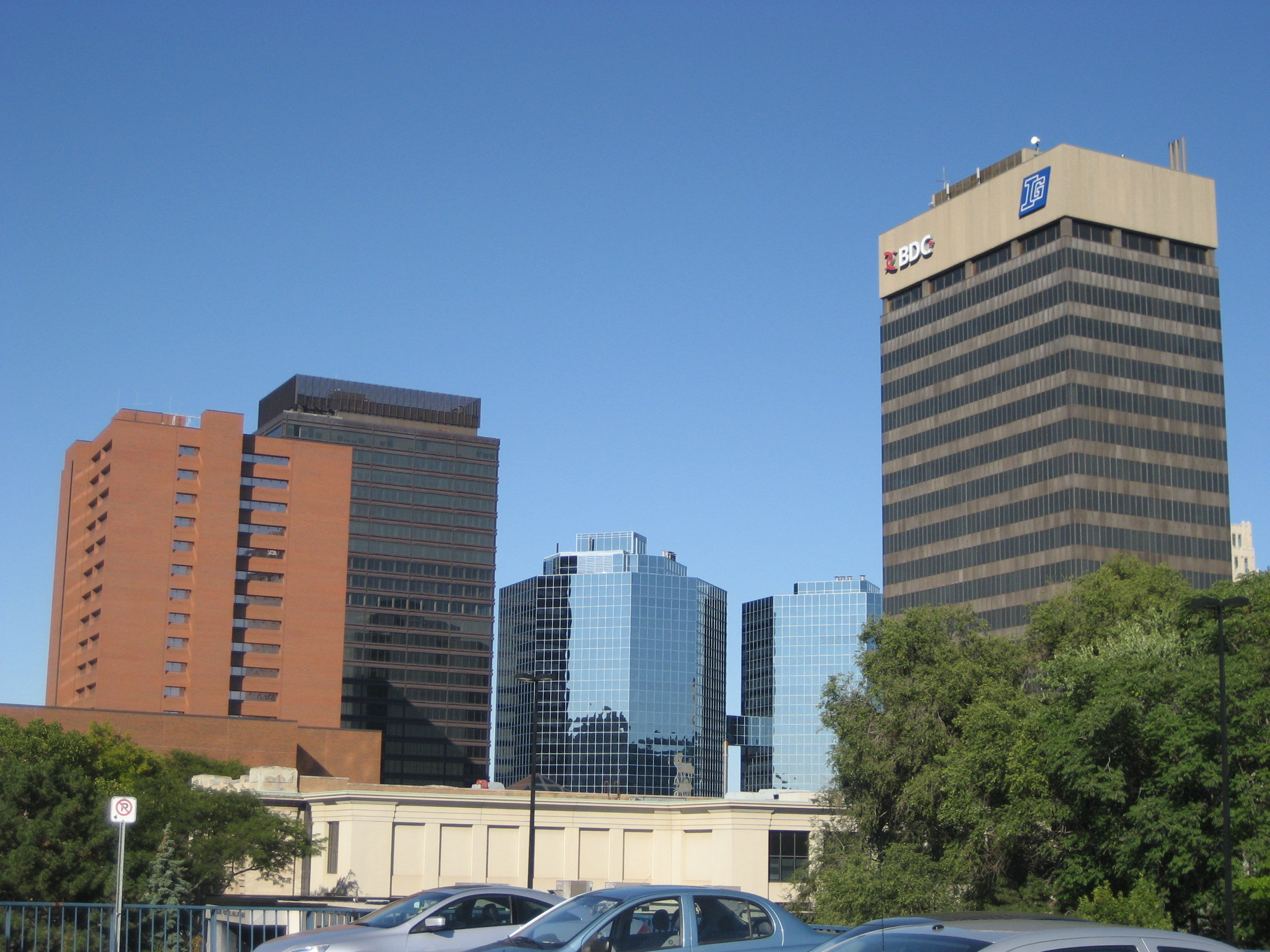
Downtown Hamilton, View from Hunter Street West
