= Augusta metropolitan area (disambiguation) =

The Augusta metropolitan area is a metropolitan area in the U.S. states of Georgia and South Carolina centered on Augusta, Georgia.

Augusta metropolitan area may also refer to:

- The Augusta, Maine micropolitan area, United States

== See also ==
- Augusta (disambiguation)
