= Augustus (disambiguation) =

Augustus (63 BC – 14 AD) was the first emperor of ancient Rome.

Augustus may also refer to:

== Title ==
- Augustus (honorific), a title generally used by Roman Emperors

== People ==
=== People with the name ===
- Augustus (given name)
- Augustus, Elector of Saxony (1526–1588)
- Augustus II the Strong (1670–1733), King of Poland and Grand Duke of Lithuania and Elector of Saxony
- Augustus III of Poland (1696–1763), King of Poland and Grand Duke of Lithuania and Elector of Saxony
- Augustus the Younger, Duke of Brunswick-Lüneburg (1579–1666), Duke within the Holy Roman Empire
- Emanuel Augustus, boxer
- Ernest Augustus (disambiguation), numerous people
  - Ernest Augustus, Elector of Hanover (1629–1698), father of King George I of Great Britain
  - Ernest Augustus, Duke of York and Albany, Prince-Bishop of Osnabrück, son of the Elector of Hanover
  - Ernest Augustus, King of Hanover (1771–1851), son of King George III of the United Kingdom
  - Ernest Augustus, Crown Prince of Hanover, (1845–1923), son of George V of Hanover
  - Ernest Augustus, Duke of Brunswick (1887–1953), son of the Crown Prince of Hanover
  - Prince Ernest Augustus of Hanover (1914–1987), son of the Duke of Brunswick
  - Ernest Augustus I, Duke of Saxe-Weimar-Eisenach (1688–1748)
  - Ernest Augustus II, Duke of Saxe-Weimar-Eisenach (1737–1758), son of Ernest Augustus I, Duke of Saxe-Weimar-Eisenach
- Frederick Augustus III of Saxony (1865–1932), the last King of Saxony
- John Augustus (1785–1859), a Boston boot maker known as the "Father of Probation"
- Philip Augustus (1165–1223), King of France
- Sigismund II Augustus (1520–1572), King of Poland and Grand Duke of Lithuania, the last monarch from the Jagiellon dynasty
- Stanisław II August (1730–1798), King of Poland and Grand Duke of Lithuania, the last monarch of the Polish-Lithuanian Commonwealth
- Tatannuaq, also known as Augustus
- Prince William Augustus, Duke of Cumberland (1721–1765), son of George II

== Places ==
- Augustus Island, Nunavut, Canada
- Augustus Lutheran Church, a Lutheran church building in Trappe, Pennsylvania, US
- Fort Augustus Abbey, Scotland, UK
- House of Augustus, a palace in Rome, Italy
- Mount Augustus National Park, a national park in Australia

== Arts, entertainment, and media ==
=== Literature ===
- Augustus (Massie novel), a 1986 novel by Allan Massie
- Augustus (Williams novel), a 1973 novel by John Edward Williams
- Augustus Gloop, a fictional character from Roald Dahl's book Charlie and the Chocolate Factory

=== Monuments ===
- Arch of Augustus (disambiguation)
- Augustus of Prima Porta, a Roman statue
- Trophy of Augustus, Grande Corniche
- Via Labicana Augustus, a Roman statue

== Ships ==
- MS Augustus (1952), a luxury Italian ocean liner
- MS Augustus (1926), a luxury Italian ocean liner

== Other uses ==
- Agaricus augustus, a species of mushroom
- Sextilis, the sixth, or later the eighth month in Roman Calendar.

== See also ==
- August (disambiguation)
- Augusta (disambiguation)
- Augustus Waller (disambiguation)
- Augusts (given name)
- Temple of Augustus (disambiguation)
- Wars of Augustus
