= Agusta (disambiguation) =

Agusta is an Italian manufacturer of helicopters and part of AgustaWestland.

Agusta is the Italian form of the name "Augusta" (though not necessarily a feminine name), and may also refer to:

== Companies ==
- AgustaWestland, a helicopter company
- Bell/Agusta Aerospace Company, joint venture between Bell Helicopter Textron company and Agusta (now AgustaWestland)
- MV Agusta, Italian motorcycle manufacturer

== People with the surname ==
- Giovanni Agusta (1879–1927), Italian engineer
- Domenico Agusta (1907-1971), Italian entrepreneur and son of Giovanni Agusta
- Rocky Agusta (1950–2018), Italian racing driver

== Other uses ==
- Ágústa Eva Erlendsdóttir (born 1982), Icelandic singer and actress
- Agusta scandal, a 1988 Belgian corruption scandal over the purchase of Agusta helicopters

== See also ==
- Augusta (disambiguation)
