= Agosto (surname) =

Agosto is an Italian and Spanish patronymic surname. Notable people with the surname include:

- Benjamin Agosto (Born 1982), ice dancer
- Fabricio Agosto Ramírez (born 1987), goalkeeper
- Juan Agosto (born 1958), pitcher
- Miguel Hernández Agosto (1927–2016), politician
- Victor Agosto (born 1985), anti-war activist

== See also ==
- Agosto (disambiguation)
