= Victoria Avenue (Hamilton, Ontario) =

Arterial road in Canada

Coordinates: 43.2648°N 79.8546°W

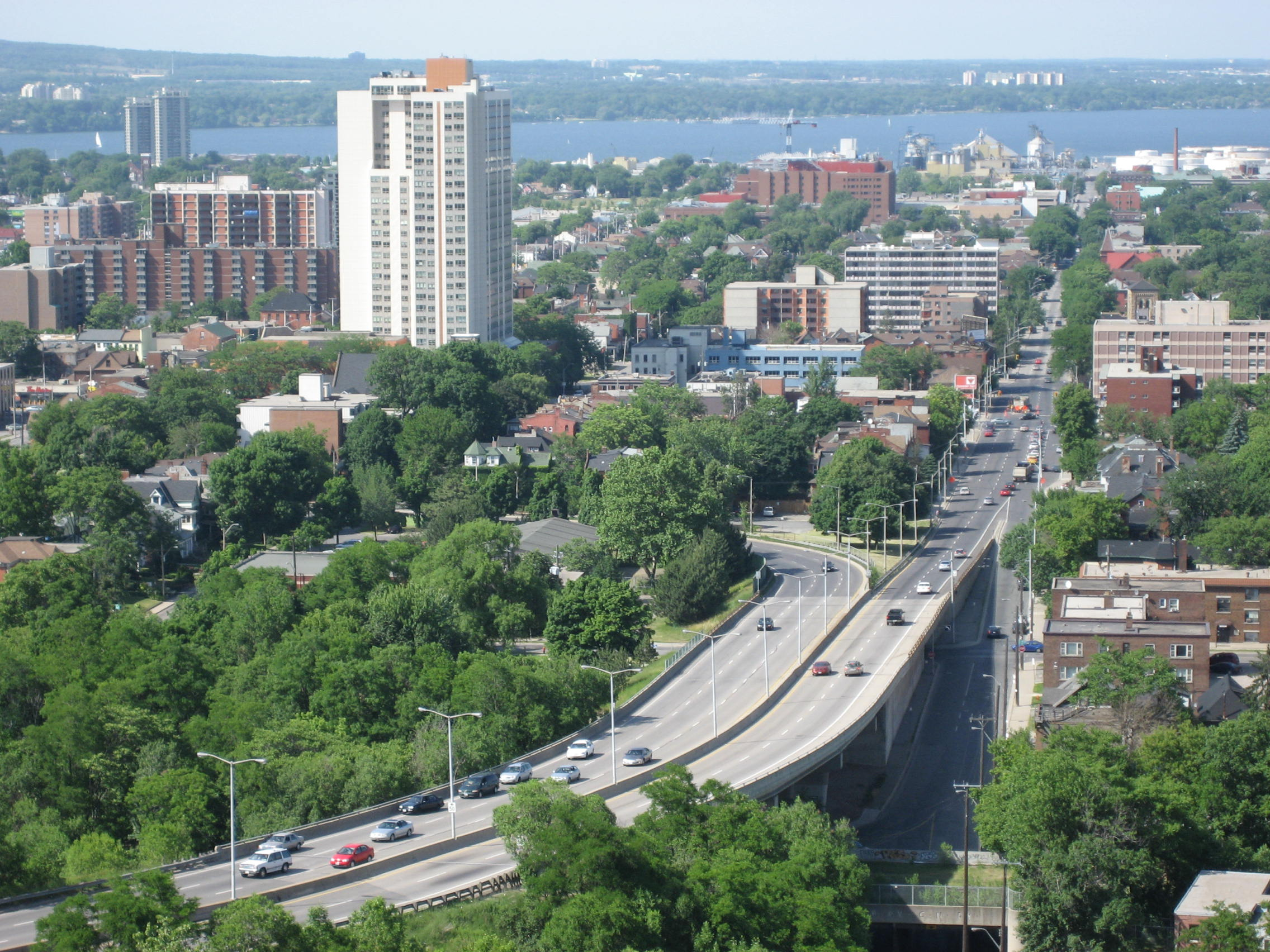
Victoria Avenue, Mountain access road

Victoria Avenue is a Lower City arterial road in Hamilton, Ontario, Canada. It starts off as a ramp and part of a Mountain-access road, the Claremont Access, on Hunter Street East in the Stinson neighbourhood. It's also a one-way thoroughfare that flows north through the Landsdale and the city's North End industrial neighbourhood past Burlington Street East where it ends at Pier 11.

== History ==
Victoria Avenue was named after Queen Victoria.

In 1902 Canadian Otis Elevator Company (1902–1987) was formed (August 22) on Victoria Avenue North. For many years Hamilton, Ontario was home to the largest single elevator manufacturing facility in the world. The workers produced all kinds of elevators, escalators and later, forklifts. In 1969, the company took over the old Studebaker plant. It was a return home for Otis, which had built the 350,000-square-foot (33,000 m^{2}) facility for wartime production of anti-aircraft guns and other military equipment.

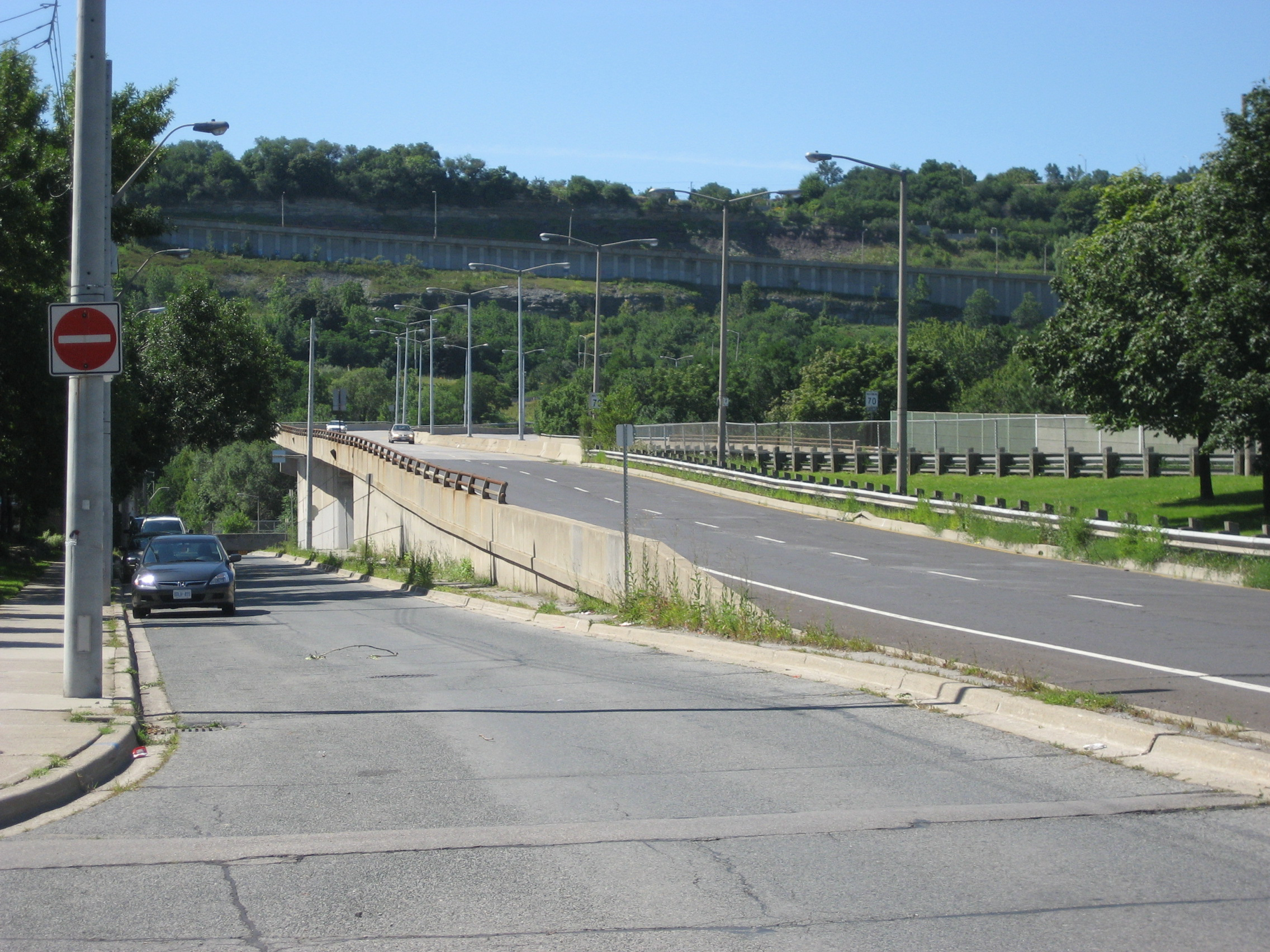
Victoria Avenue, mountain-access ramp

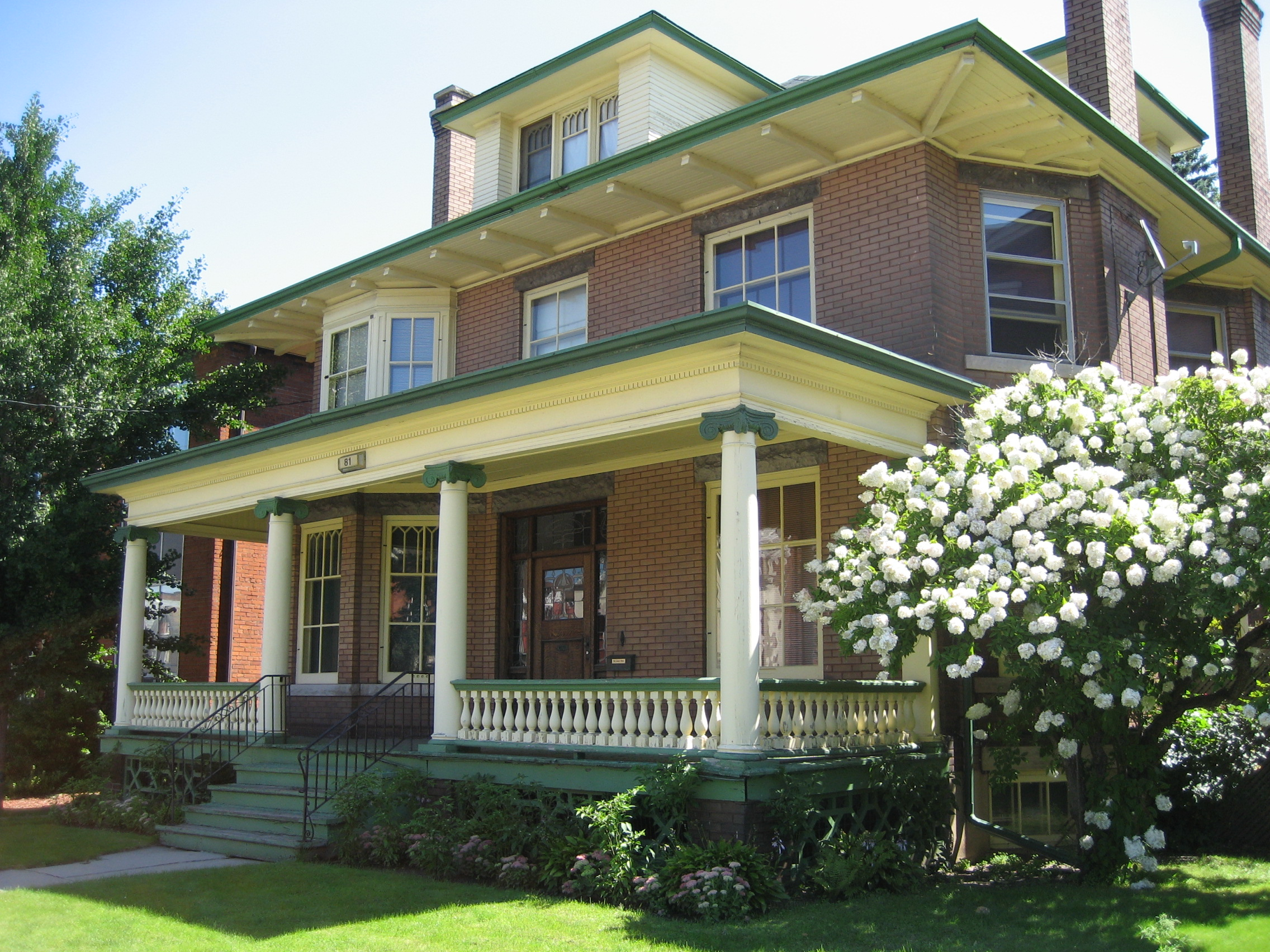
Canadian Action Group Youth Employment Centre

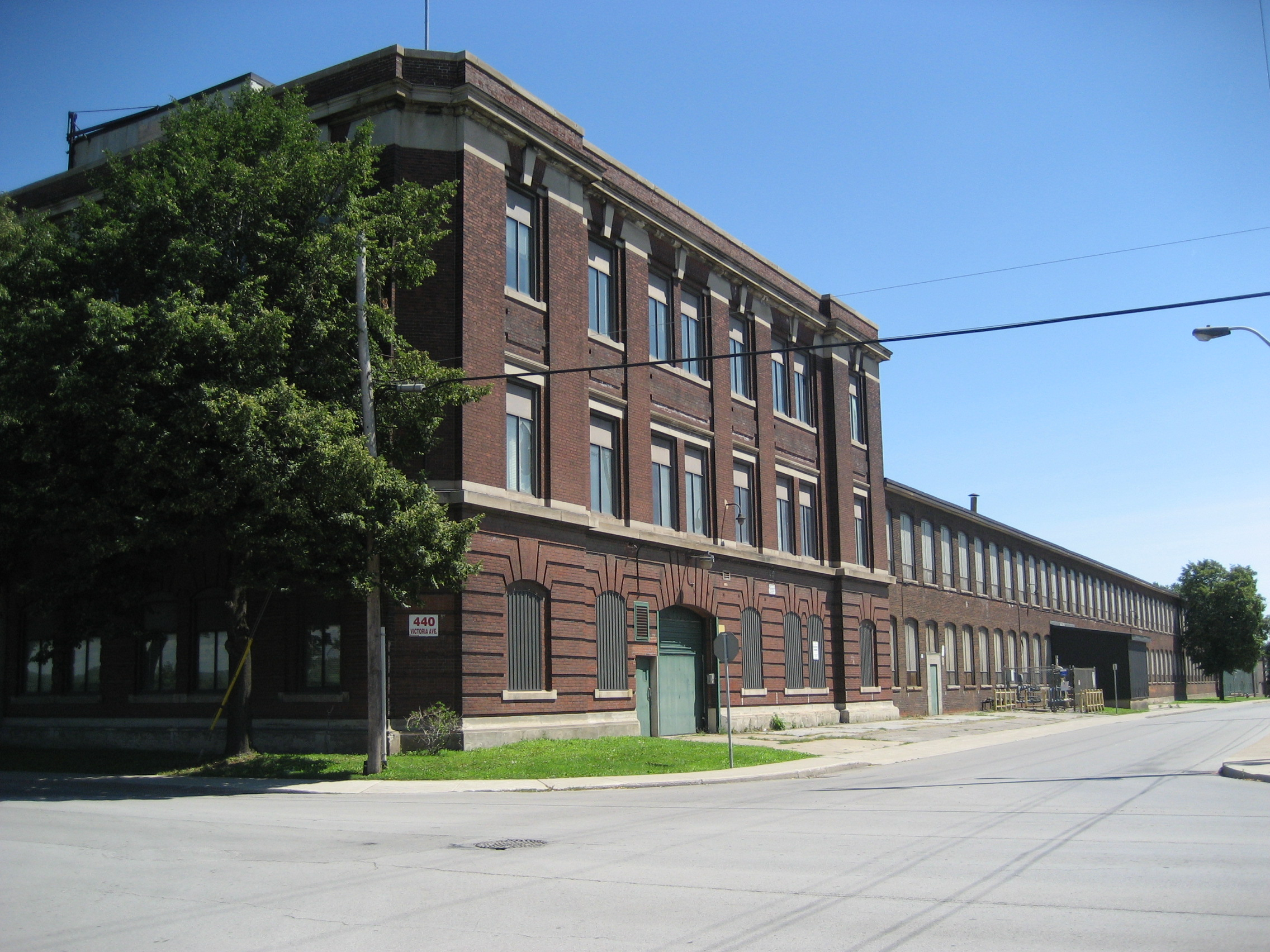
Old Otis Elevator/ Studebaker plant building

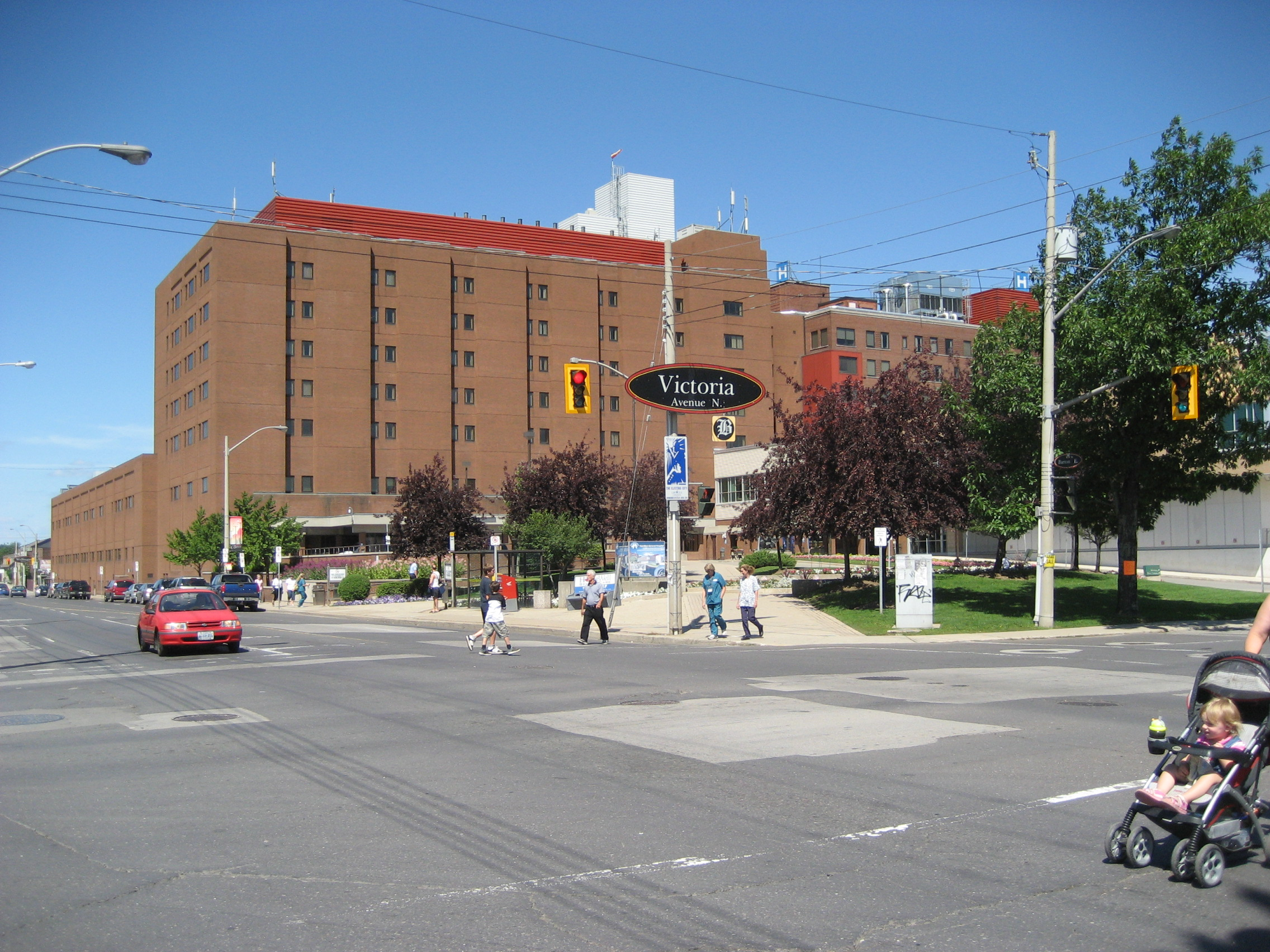
Hamilton General Hospital

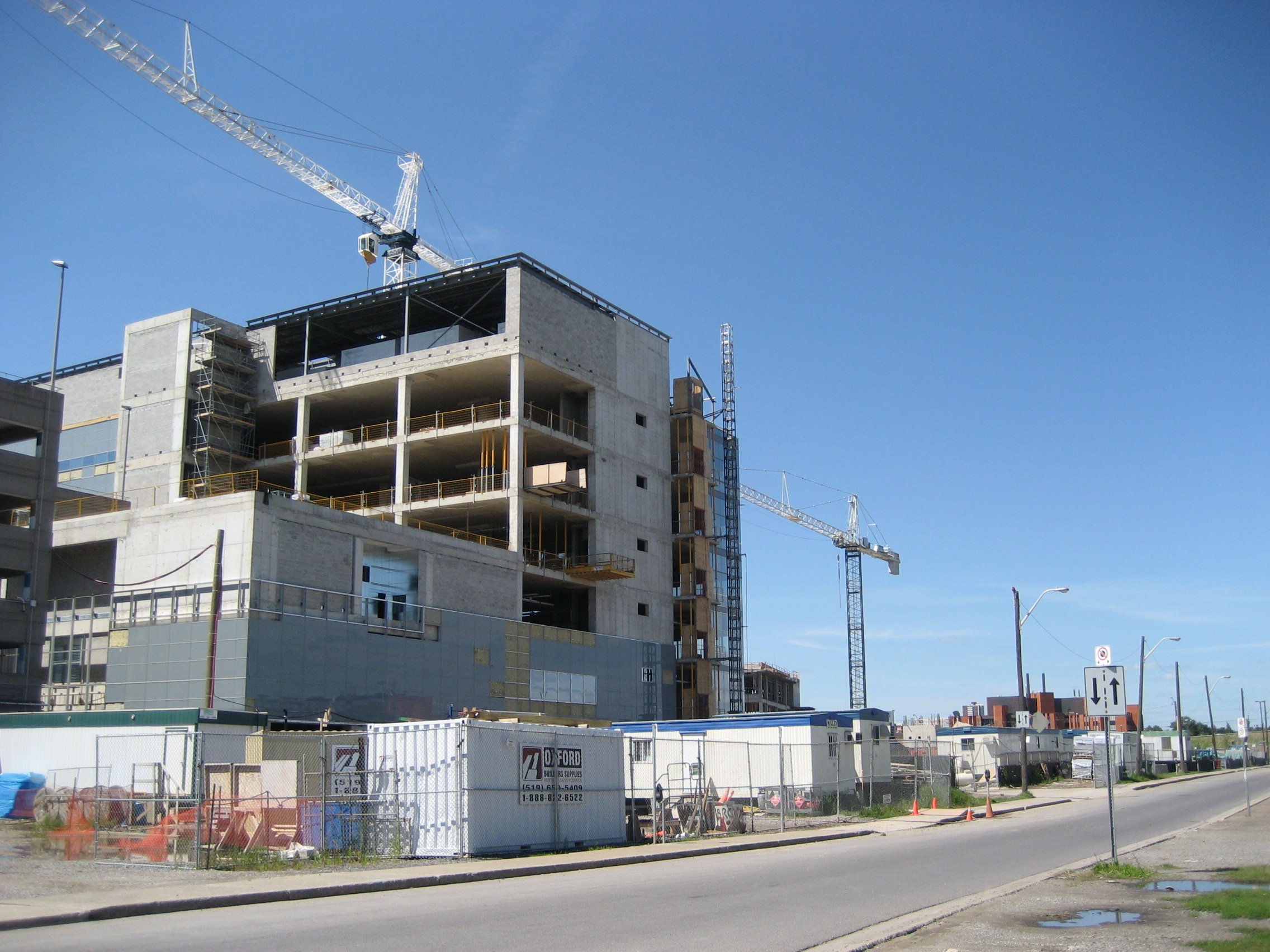
David Braley Cardiac, Vascular and Stroke Research Institute (Under construction)

On August 18, 1948, surrounded by more than 400 employees and a battery of reporters, the first vehicle, a blue Champion four-door sedan, rolled off the Studebaker assembly line. (Studebaker Canada Ltd.) The company was located in the former Otis-Fenson military weapons factory off Burlington Street East, which was built in 1941. The Indiana-based Studebaker was looking for a Canadian site and settled on Hamilton because of its steel industry. The company was known for making automotive innovations and building solid distinctive cars. 1950 was its best year but the descent was quick. By 1954, Studebaker was in the red and merging with Packard, another falling car manufacturer. In 1963, the company moved its entire car operations to Hamilton. The Canadian car side had always been a money-maker and Studebaker was looking to curtail disastrous losses. That took the plant from a single to double shift — 48 to 96 cars daily. The last car to roll off the line was a turquoise Lark cruiser on March 4, 1966. Studebaker officially shuts down the next day on March 5, 1966, as its last car factory. It was terrible news for the 700 workers who had formed a true family at the company, known for its employee parties and day trips. It was a huge blow to the city, too. Studebaker was Hamilton's 10th largest employer at the time.

Hamilton Health Sciences is the largest employer in Hamilton with nearly 10,000 employees and serves approximately 2.2 million people in central south and central west Ontario. Hamilton Health Sciences is a family of five unique hospitals and a cancer centre, they include Chedoke Hospital, Hamilton General Hospital, Henderson General Hospital, McMaster Children's Hospital, McMaster University Medical Centre and the Juravinski Cancer Centre. Hamilton Health Sciences is affiliated with McMaster University's Faculty of Health Sciences. It is one of the most comprehensive health care systems in Canada.

The David Braley Cardiac, Vascular and Stroke Research Institute is a $90-million Research Centre that will be home to 500+ scientists and will be built right behind the Hamilton General Hospital. The new building with 165,000 square feet (15,300 m^{2}) is expected to open in 2010. At least 250 new jobs will be added to the local economy. David Braley contributed $10-million towards the project. Braley's donation marks an important transition in Hamilton's economy, as he takes money he made in the industrial economy and uses it to help the community develop a more diverse economic base. David Braley is the president of auto-parts manufacturer Orlick Industries Ltd., former owner of the Hamilton Tiger-Cats and current owner of the B.C. Lions.

In recent years there has been talk of converting the 500,000-square-foot (46,000 m^{2}) facility on Victoria Avenue North that was one time home of the Otis Elevator Company and Studebaker plant into a Mega-Film Studio. In 2004 a group of local investors were ready to open up the $30-million facility named Hamilton Film Studios but pulled out two months after it opened up. One of the main reasons was they overestimated the appeal of the site, in that the interior had too many support beams, making the space impractical for productions requiring wide, uninterrupted expanses.

Bunge is an oilseed processing plant and Canada's largest canola processor. It has crushing facilities in Altona and Harrowby, Manitoba; Fort Saskatchewan, Alberta; and Nipawin, Saskatchewan in addition to the processing plant in Hamilton. The Hamilton plant on Victoria Avenue North, has been in operation since 1943 and serves food manufacturers, the biodiesel industry and farmers in Ontario & Quebec.

== Landmarks ==
Note: Listing of Landmarks from North to South.

- Pier 11
- BUNGE Soya and Canola Processing plant (Canada's largest canola processor)
- Vopak Terminals of Canada Inc. (liquid bulk storage)
- E.M.S. Operation Centre- Station 30
- Otis Elevator Buildings (2), site of Otis Elevator Company, (1902–1987) and Studebaker Canada Ltd., (1948–1966) Today used as a warehouse by Stelco and various other North End industries.
- Hamilton Community HEALTH CENTRE
- Trebor Allan Candy (factory), off Shaw Street, makers of Sour Patch Kids and candy canes.
- Canadian National railway tracks
- Hamilton General Hospital Parking Complex (6-storey complex)
- David Braley Cardiac, Vascular and Stroke Research Institute (Under construction)
- Victoria Medical Centre building
- Hamilton Health Sciences Corporation Library building
- Hamilton Health Sciences- Hamilton General Hospital
- Romanian Baptist Church
- Apostolic Christian Church
- Jack C Beemer Park
- King William apartments (10-storey building)
- St. Patrick's Roman Catholic Church
- Versa-Care Centre (8-storey building)
- Donna Court, (9-storey apartment building)
- Citizen Action Group Youth Employment Centre Employment Hamilton
- Victoria Manor I & II (retirement homes)
- Victoria Avenue ramp (Mountain-access), turns into the Claremont Access Road

== Communities ==
Note: Listing of neighbourhoods from North to South

- North End — Everything north of the Canadian National Railway tracks
- Landsdale
- Stinson

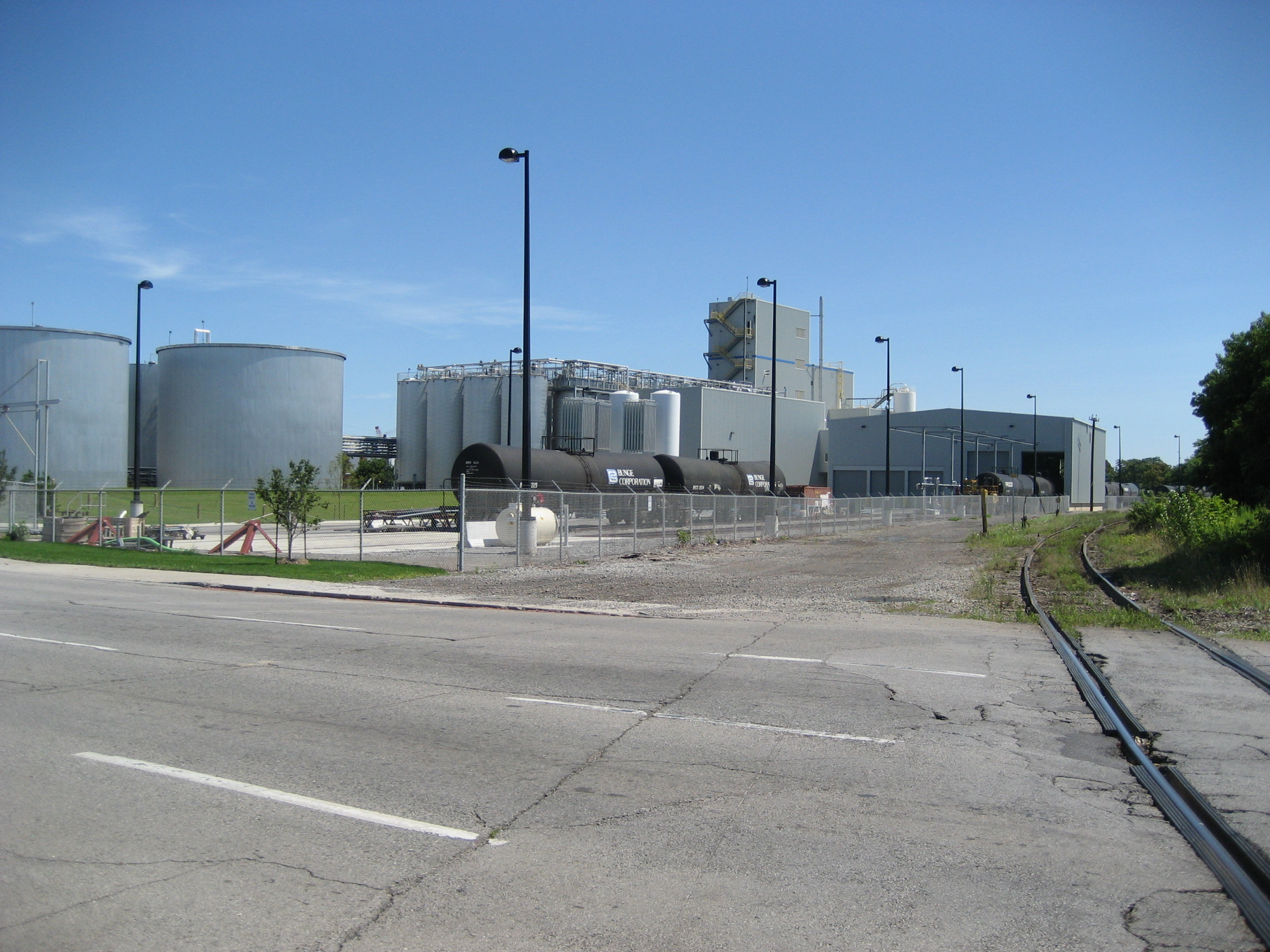
Victoria Avenue North, near Burlington Street

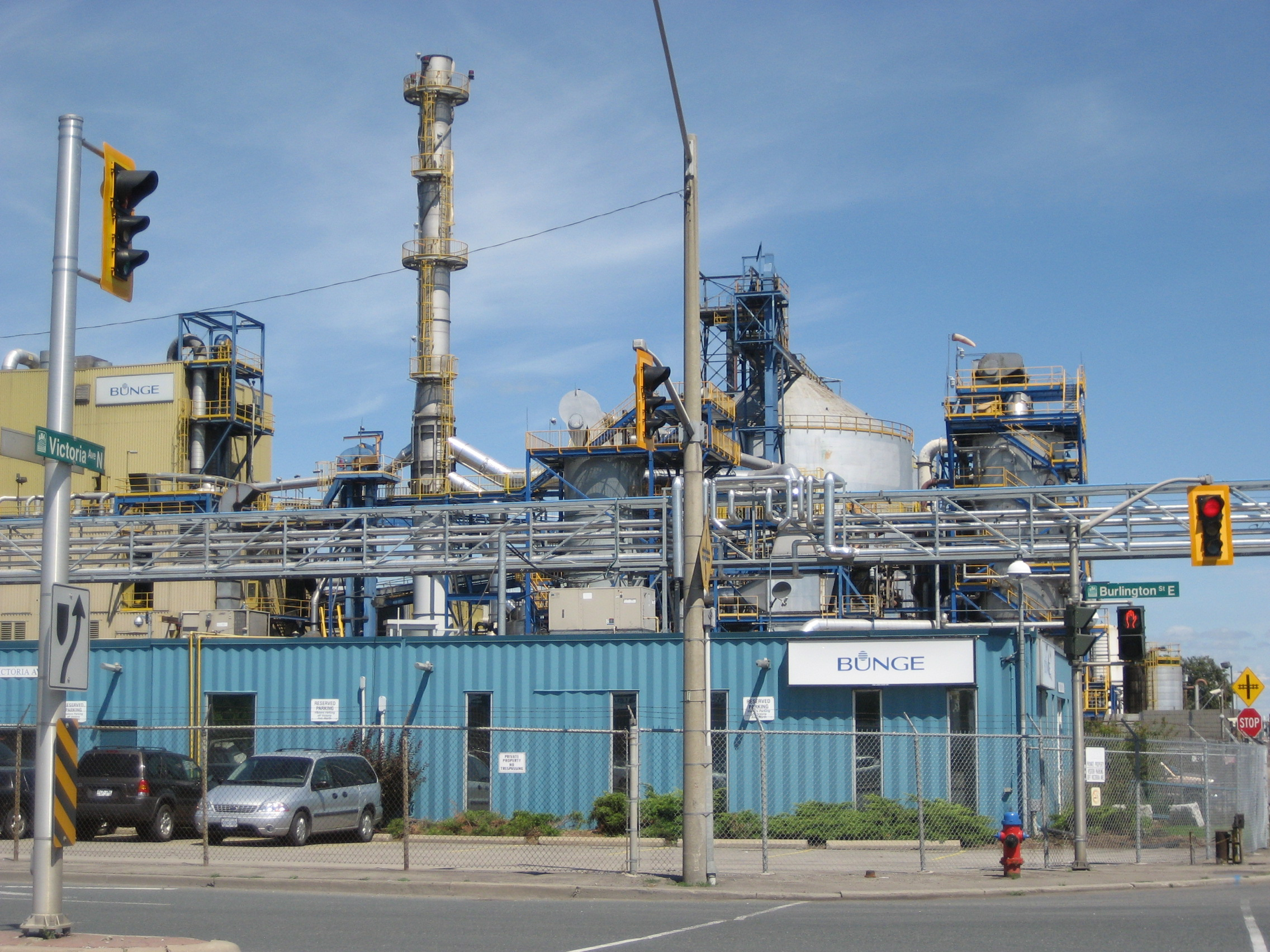
BUNGE Limited, Canola processing plant
