= Augusta =

Augusta was a Roman imperial honorific title given to empresses and women of imperial families. It was the feminine form of Augustus. It may refer to:

== Places ==
=== Australia ===
- Augusta, Western Australia

=== Brazil ===
- Rua Augusta (São Paulo)

=== Canada ===
- Augusta, Ontario
- North Augusta, Ontario
- Augusta Street (Hamilton, Ontario)

=== France ===
- Augusta Suessionum ("Augusta of the Suessii"), Soissons
- Augusta Viromanduorum ("Augusta of the Viromandui"), Saint-Quentin

=== Germany ===
- Augusta Treverorum ("Augusta of the Treveri") or Trier
- Augusta Vangionum ("Augusta of the Vangiones") or Worms
- Augusta Vindelicorum ("Augusta of the Vindelici") or Augsburg

=== Italy ===
- Augusta, Sicily
- Augusta Praetoria Salassorum ("Praetorian Augusta of the Salassi") or Aosta
- Augusta Taurinorum ("Augusta of the Taurini") or Turin
- Perugia or Augusta Perusia

=== Spain ===
- Emerita Augusta, Mérida, Spain
- Caesar Augusta, Zaragoza, Spain

=== United States ===
- Augusta, Arkansas
- Augusta Charter Township, Michigan
- Augusta County, Virginia
- Augusta, Georgia, the most-populous city in the U.S. with this name
  - Augusta National Golf Club ("Augusta"), home of the Masters Tournament
- Augusta, Illinois
- Augusta, Indiana
- Augusta, Indianapolis, Indiana
- Augusta, Kansas
- Augusta, Kentucky
- Augusta, Maine (capital city of Maine)
- Augusta, Michigan
- Augusta, Minnesota
- Augusta, Missouri
  - Augusta AVA, a viticultural area
- Augusta, Montana
- Augusta, New Jersey
- Augusta, New York
- Augusta Township, Lac qui Parle County, Minnesota
- Augusta, West Virginia
- Augusta, Wisconsin
- Fort Augusta, Pennsylvania
- Mount Augusta, Alaska
- North Augusta, South Carolina
- St. Augusta, Minnesota
- Sipapu Bridge, Utah, formerly named as 'Augusta'

=== Elsewhere ===
- Augusta Euphratensis, Late Roman and Byzantine province in Syrian region
- Augusta Raurica ("Rauric Augusta"), Kaiseraugst (Augst), Switzerland
- Augusta Traiana ("Trajan Augusta"), Stara Zagora, Bulgaria
- Bracara Augusta, Braga, Portugal
- Isca Augusta ("Augustan Isca"), Caerleon, Wales
- Londinium (former name Augusta), London, England
- Lastovo (former name Augusta), a Croatian island
- Empress Augusta Bay, Bougainville Island

== People ==
- Augusta (honorific), a title used for the Empresses of the Roman and Byzantine Empires
- Augusta (name), a given name and surname

== Roman roads ==
- Via Augusta
- Via Claudia Augusta

== Science ==
- 254 Augusta, an asteroid
  - Augusta family, an asteroid family
- Augusta, a monotypic spider genus in the family Araneidae with the only species Augusta glyphica
- Augusta (plant), a genus in the family Rubiaceae
- Ponera augusta, a species of ant

== Ships ==
- USS Augusta, U.S. Navy ships named Augusta
- HMS Augusta, Royal Navy ships named Augusta
- Princess Augusta (ship), a British ship wrecked in 1738
- Augusta (lifeboat), a lifeboat, Sheringham, Norfolk, England

== Other uses ==
- Augusta Apartment Building, listed on the National Register of Historic Places in Washington, D.C., US
- Augustan History (Latin: Historia Augusta), a half-mockumentary biography of the Roman emperors of the 1st and 2nd century
- Augusta Heritage Festival, a festival in West Virginia, US
- Legio II Augusta, a Roman legion
- Augusta (album), by Willie Nelson and Don Cherry
- Lancia Augusta, an automobile
- Augusta (grape), an Italian grape variety
- The Augustas, a homemade movie about towns named "Augusta"

== See also ==
- Shire of Augusta Margaret River, Australia
- Augusta Euphratensis ("Euphratean Augusta"), a Roman province in Syria under Diocletian
- Aust, a village in Gloucestershire, England, claimed to be derived from Augusta
- Augustus (disambiguation)
- August (disambiguation)
- Augusts (given name)
- Agusta (disambiguation)
- Port Augusta (disambiguation)
- Agusta, later AgustaWestland, a helicopter manufacturer.
