= Peter Hunter Hamilton =

Canadian businessman

Peter Hunter Hamilton (1800–1857) was a businessman in British North America.

Hamilton was born in 1800 at Queenston Heights, Upper Canada. He was a younger half-brother of George Hamilton, the founder of Hamilton, Ontario.

He owned extensive lands in the area, including lot 15 concession 3, purchased from George in 1823, which served as a drill ground for the local militia and in 1851 became the site of Central School. He also owned the site of St. Andrew's Presbyterian Church, now St. Paul's Presbyterian Church, of which he was an elder in 1835. St. Paul's is now a national historical heritage site.

He died in 1857 at Hamilton, Ontario, and was buried in Hamilton Cemetery.

== Tribute ==
Hunter Street in the city of Hamilton is named after him.
