= Port Augusta (disambiguation) =

Port Augusta is a city in South Australia.

Port Augusta may also refer to places associated with the city.

- Port Augusta, a locality
- Port Augusta Airport
- Port Augusta Prison
- Port Augusta railway station
- Port Augusta Town Hall, former town hall
- City of Port Augusta, a local government area

== See also ==
- Augusta (disambiguation)
- Port Augusta West
