= Agosto =

Agosto may refer to:

- Agosto (surname)
- Agosto Arcangelo (1885–1929), known as Salvatore Todaro, Sicilian-American organized-crime figure
- Agosto (film), a 1987 French film
- "Agosto" (song), a 2015 song by Álvaro Soler
- "Agosto", a 2022 song by Bad Bunny from Un Verano Sin Ti
- Agosto, a 1990 novel by Rubem Fonseca

== See also ==
- Clube Desportivo Primeiro de Agosto, an Angolan multi-sport club
