= The August =

American country rock band

The August was a country rock band formed in Chicago, Illinois in 2005 relocating to Nashville, Tennessee. The band disbanded in 2013. Members included Jacky Dustin, Wojtek Krupka, Tim Good, Cameron Clarke, Petey Kapp and Pat Blanchard.

== Press ==
Chicago Tribune:

- August turns dating maladies into some bittersweet melodies
- The August is getting hotter

The Nashville Bridge:

- The August with Jacky Dustin Sweet Emotion at Douglas

Daily Herald:

- 83rd Lake County Fair offers simpler time

== History ==
Patrick Blanchard, previous guitar player, currently is touring with Shawn Mullins.

== Discography ==
- Thistle, Sparrow, and the Tall, Tall Grass - 2005
- The Aware Compilation 11 - 2005
- The Uptown Session - 2009
- Dear Chicago, Love Nashville - 2011
