= Augustus Waller =

Augustus Waller may refer to:

- Augustus Volney Waller (1816–1870), British neurophysiologist
- Augustus Desiré Waller (1856–1922), son of Augustus Volney Waller, scientist
