= Augusta Street (Hamilton, Ontario) =

Road in Hamilton, Ontario, Canada

Augusta Street is a Lower City collector road in Hamilton, Ontario, Canada. A two-way collector road that starts off on James Street South and ends 4-blocks East at Shamrock Park just past Walnut Street South.

== History ==
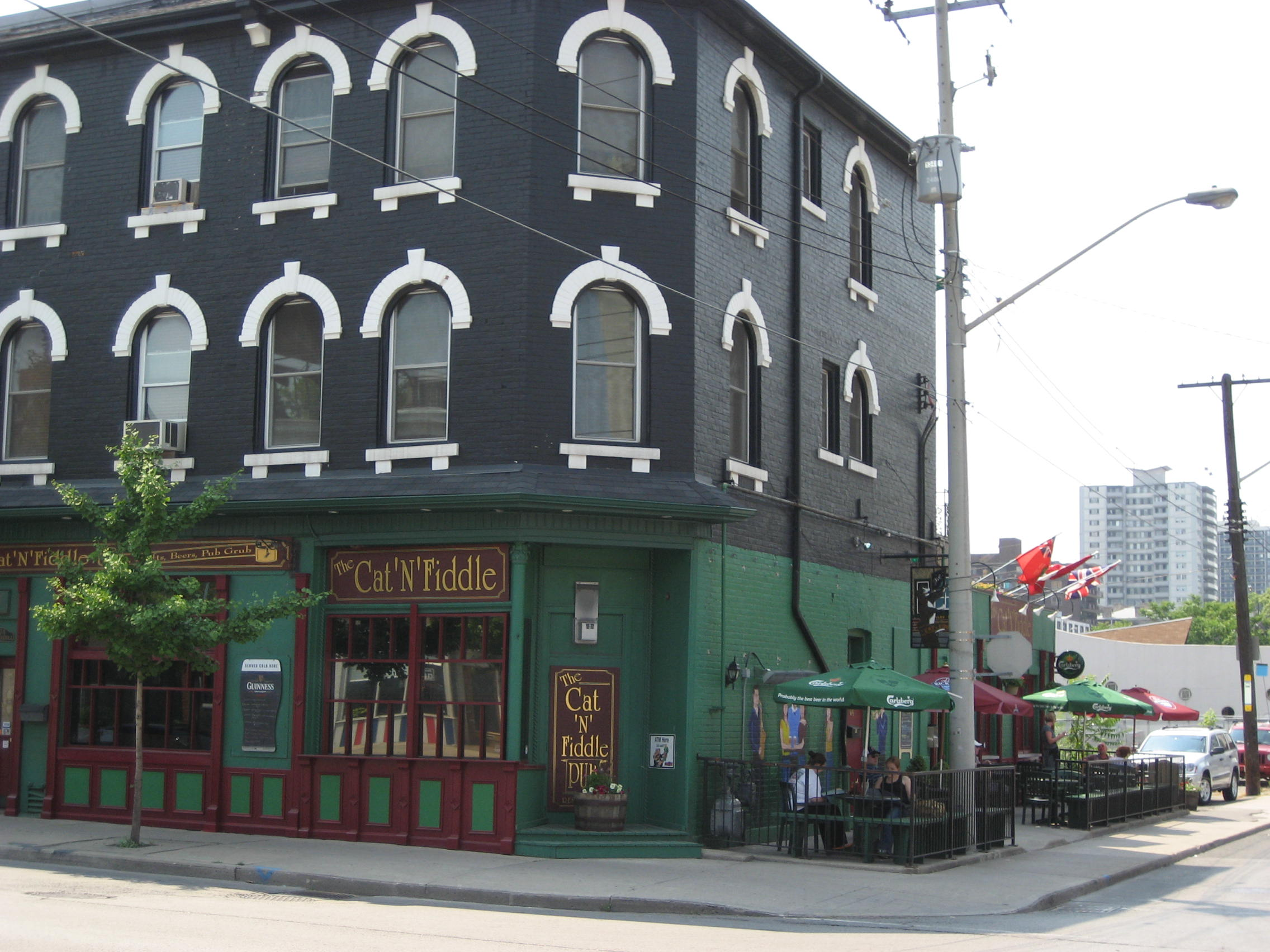
Augusta Street, landmark

Augusta Street between Catharine Street and Ferguson Avenue was originally known as O'Reilly Street. In 1895 when the TH&B (Toronto, Hamilton and Buffalo Railway) line was built the street was truncated at Walnut Street South. The railway line also cut the Corktown neighbourhood in two. The elevated railway line cuts through Shamrock Park.

== Culture ==
This street also plays host to a yearly block party each August, that extends along Augusta from James St. S. to Hughson St. S. From the Augusta Street Block Party website:

The Augusta Block Party [features] Live music, local vendors, food and a licensed beer garden are just the start! This event is for the whole family, with features including kids play areas, fire safety lessons from Hamilton's finest fire fighters, and a Chili Cook-off with proceeds to the Hamilton Professional Fire Fighters Assistance Fund.

== Landmarks ==
Note: Listing of Landmarks from West to East.

- James Street South Shopping District
- Augusta British Pub District:
  - The Pheasant Plucker
  - Aout'n About Inc.
  - Augusta's 'Winking Judge'
  - Cat 'N' Fiddle
  - The Ship
  - Augusta House Gastropub
- Residences on Augusta (Seniors residence)
- Canadian Pacific Railway line (originally the TH&B, Toronto, Hamilton and Buffalo Railway line (1892-1987))
- Shamrock Park

== Community ==
- Corktown

== See also ==
- Royal eponyms in Canada
