= Ernest Augustus =

Ernest Augustus or Ernst August may refer to:

== Royalty ==
=== House of Hanover ===
- Ernest Augustus, Elector of Hanover (1629–1698), father of King George I of Great Britain
- Ernest Augustus, Duke of York and Albany, Prince-Bishop of Osnabrück, son of the previous
- Ernest Augustus, King of Hanover (1771–1851), son of King George III of the United Kingdom
- Ernest Augustus, Crown Prince of Hanover, (1845–1923), son of George V of Hanover
- Ernest Augustus, Duke of Brunswick (1887–1953), son of the previous
- Prince Ernest Augustus of Hanover (born 1914) (1914–1987), son of the previous
- Prince Ernst August von Hannover (born 1954), son of the previous
- Prince Ernst August of Hanover (born 1983), son of previous

=== House of Wettin ===
- Ernest Augustus I, Duke of Saxe-Weimar-Eisenach (1688–1748)
- Ernest Augustus II, Duke of Saxe-Weimar-Eisenach (1737–1758), son of the previous

== Other ==
- Ernst August (ship), a ship named after Ernest Augustus, King of Hanover
