= Carlisle, Hamilton, Ontario =

Community in Hamilton, Ontario, Canada

Coordinates: 43.4010°N 79.9755°W

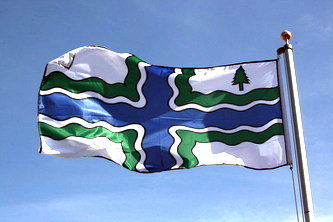
The Flag of the Flamborough Region (unveiled at Carlisle Golf & CC in 2011)

Carlisle is a community in Flamborough, Hamilton, Ontario, Canada. The town lies about 15 kilometres (9.3 mi) north of Waterdown.

== Notable attractions ==
The downtown of Carlisle is located at the crossroads of Carlisle and Centre Roads.

The Community Centre includes an ice rink, where many events and fundraisers are held by both local churches and the Optimist Club. The surrounding grounds include a baseball diamond, tennis court, swings and a play structure. Funds for the play structure were raised by Norah Kraft and Jeff Doyle, with their children and friends from Balaclava Public School deciding on the layout of the structure.

The Hamilton Public Library, was once a TD bank until late August 2022.

Carlisle was once host to Bluegrass Canada, a Folk Festival which kicked off the beginning of every summer.

Progreston Falls is a curtain waterfall on private property in the area.

Mulch Park (beside doctors office) is home to a Hamilton building that is a popular graffiti/ hang out spot for local teenagers and children.

== Parks and recreation ==
Carlisle has numerous soccer fields, parks, baseball diamonds, and small forests.

Courtcliffe Park is a naturalized area with streams, bridges, walkways and trails.

The Carlisle Conservation Area is located within the Village of Carlisle along Bronte Creek, east and west of Centre Road, and is administered by Conservation Halton. Trout were stocked in this reach of the creek in the 1970s. Existing fishing opportunities are generally restricted to pumpkinseed, creek chub and white sucker; however, largemouth bass, northern pike and brown trout may also be angled in the slow-moving waters.

== Education ==
Two elementary schools serve the students of Carlisle, both of which are located at the intersection of Centre Road and Concession Road 10 E, just north of the town proper.

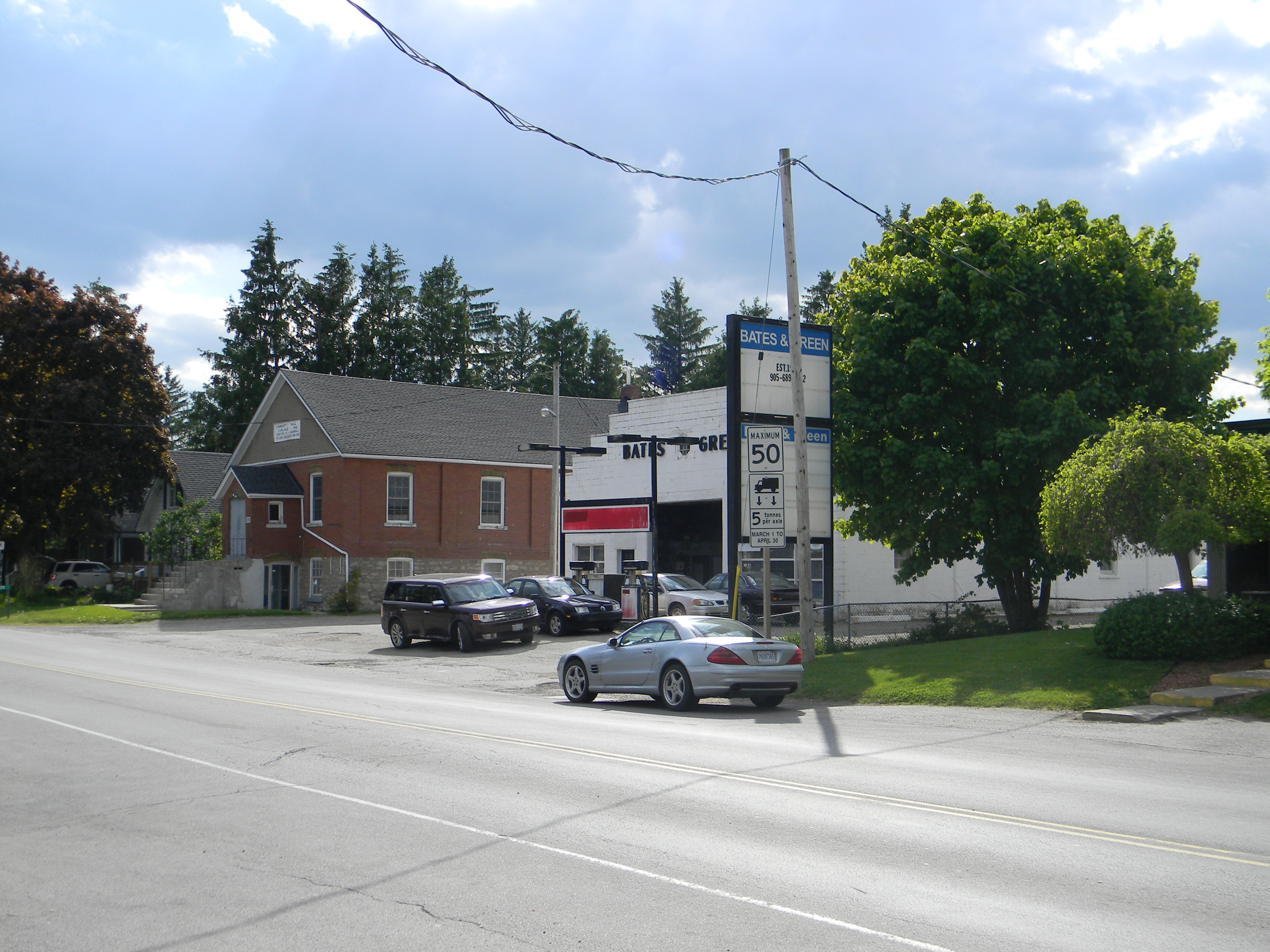
Carlisle downtown, Community Hall

Balaclava Elementary School is a K-8 public school administered by the Hamilton-Wentworth District School Board.

Our Lady of Mount Carmel Catholic Elementary School is a pre K- grade 8 catholic school and daycare centre. It is administered by the Hamilton-Wentworth Catholic District School Board.

Upon graduation, students from these schools may go on to attend Waterdown District High School or St. Mary Catholic Secondary School.

== Film and television ==
The Bates & Green gas station (no longer a gas station, but a full-service garage and Napa Auto supplier) has been used as a filming location for scenes from the Canadian comedy series The Red Green Show, as well as motion pictures. The Carlisle Public Arena has been used on at least one occasion for the filming of a major motion picture. Carlisle General Store was used in the film The Ref.

== See also ==
- List of communities in Ontario
