= Jeff Malott =

Canadian ice hockey player (born 1996)

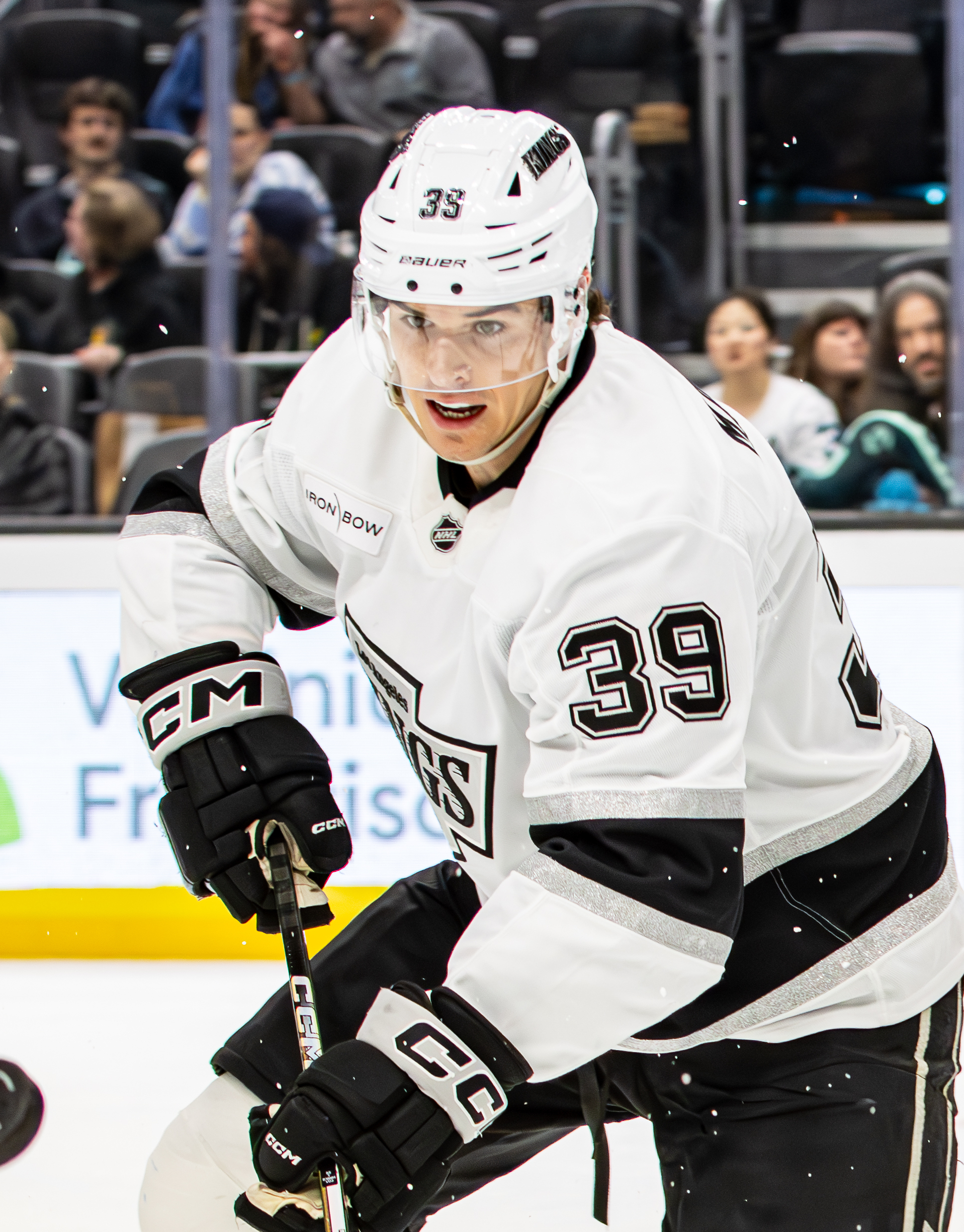
- Malott with the Los Angeles Kings in 2025
- Born: August 7, 1996 (age 30) Burlington, Ontario, Canada
- Height: 6 ft 3 in (191 cm)
- Weight: 201 lb (91 kg; 14 st 5 lb)
- Position: Left wing
- Shoots: Left
- NHL team Former teams: Anaheim Ducks; Winnipeg Jets; Los Angeles Kings
- NHL draft: Undrafted
- Playing career: 2021–present

Jeffrey Turner Malott (born August 7, 1996) is a Canadian professional ice hockey player who is a left winger for the Anaheim Ducks of the National Hockey League (NHL). He previously played college ice hockey for Cornell University.

== Early life ==
Malott was born on August 7, 1996, in Burlington, Ontario, to Murray and Anne Malott. He was raised in Waterdown, Ontario, and grew up playing ice hockey, soccer, and basketball. He began playing junior ice hockey with the Caledonia Pro-Fit Corvairs of the Greater Ontario Junior Hockey League for the 2013–14 season, scoring 15 goals and 19 assists for 34 points in 48 regular-season games. The Corvairs captured the Sutherland Cup Championship that season, with Malott adding seven goals and 11 assists in 26 postseason games. The Corvairs also won the regular-season championship after the St. Catherines Falcons were docked two points for a rules violation. From there, he spent two seasons in the Alberta Junior Hockey League (AJHL) with the Brooks Bandits. During the 2015–16 season, Malott, who served as an alternate captain for the Bandits, scored 25 goals and 60 points in 46 games and helped his team win the AJHL championship and qualify for the RBC Cup.

== Playing career ==
=== College ===
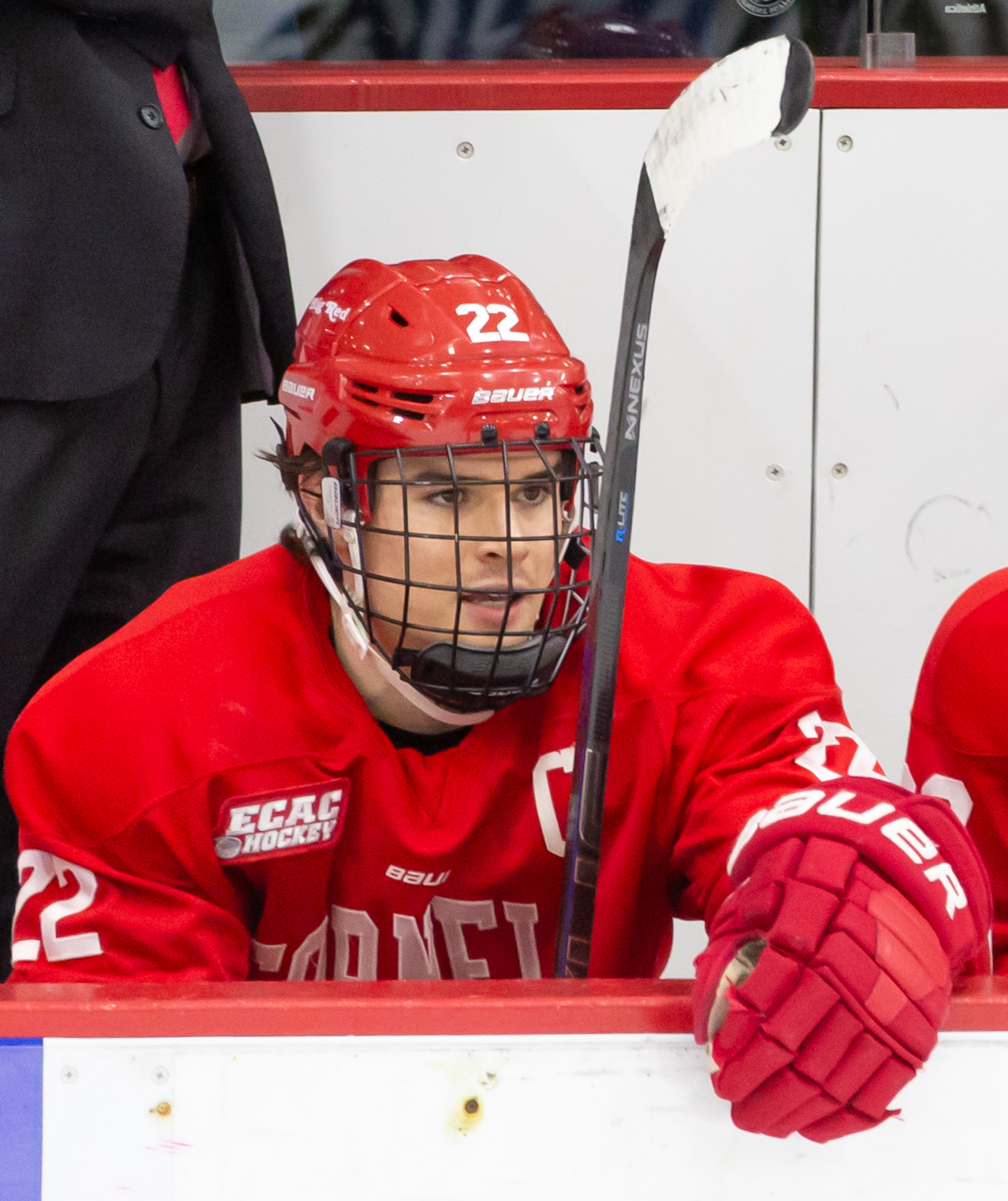
Malott with the Cornell Big Red in 2020

Malott committed to play college ice hockey for Cornell University in September 2015, matriculating for the 2016–17 season. He picked up his first collegiate point on November 29, assisting on Eric Freschi's game-winning goal in Cornell's 3–2 win against Colgate University. His first three goals all came on the same day, when Malott scored a hat-trick against Princeton on January 13. It was the first time that a Cornell freshman had scored a hat-trick since Matt Moulson did so in 2003, and Malott was named the ECAC Hockey Rookie of the Week for the feat. He finished the season with a freshman-leading six goals, finishing with nine points in 30 games.

Malott opened the 2017–18 season with a goal in Cornell's 5–1 victory over Alabama–Huntsville. On November 11, Malott had a point in every goal of Cornell's 3–2 comeback victory over Harvard, with assists on the opening and game-winning goals and scoring the game-tier. On December 30, he assisted on every goal of Kyle Betts's hat-trick against Canisius. He finished his sophomore season with six goals and 17 points in 28 games and was named to the ECAC Hockey All-Academic Team.

Malott missed three weeks of the 2018–19 season with an injury but returned on November 30 to score his first goal of his junior season. He was named the ECAC Hockey Player of the Week on February 11 after scoring two goals in Cornell's 5–0 shutout win over Clarkson, followed by an assist the next night in their 3–1 victory over St. Lawrence. In the ECAC Hockey Championship quarterfinals, Malott scored the final goal of the series to win the game 4–2 for Cornell over Union. Malott was injured in the final game of the season, Cornell's 3–2 overtime loss to Clarkson in the ECAC Hockey Championship. He scored six goals and 14 points in 27 games that season, with 12 of those points coming in his final 16 games.

Malott was one of three captains that Cornell named for the 2019–20 season. Cornell was the last team in the United States to remain undefeated in the 2019–20 season when they won 3–1 over the other undefeated team, Harvard, on December 6. Malott scored the first goal in Cornell's 3–1 win, moving the Big Red to 10–0 overall. Their unbeaten streak ended there, however, as they lost 2–1 to Dartmouth the following day. He finished his senior season with six goals and 13 points in 39 games. Malott was a finalist for the ECAC Hockey Best Defensive Forward award, as he was the only college hockey player in the country who was never on the ice for a full strength goal against his team, giving him a +15 plus–minus rating.

=== Professional ===
==== Winnipeg Jets (2020–2024) ====
On April 8, 2020, Malott signed a professional contract with the Manitoba Moose, the American Hockey League (AHL) affiliate of the Winnipeg Jets of the National Hockey League (NHL). He was the first Cornell player from his graduating class to sign a professional ice hockey contract. He was unable to play for the Moose at the end of their 2019–20 season due to the COVID-19 pandemic, and he instead began his professional ice hockey career with the Florida Everblades of the ECHL in January 2021 to prepare for the AHL. In his first year with the Moose, Malott scored 14 goals, the most on the team and the second-highest of any AHL rookie that season. He had 20 points and 35 penalty minutes in 34 games.

On May 31, 2021, the Jets signed Malott to a one-year, two-way contract worth $780,000 for the 2021–22 season. On February 28, 2022, Malott went viral when he won a shootout against the Chicago Wolves and proceeded to skate off the ice without celebrating the victory. Malott was promoted to the Jets on March 20 after scoring 32 goals and 48 points with the Moose since his professional hockey debut. Malott made his NHL debut that night for the Jets' 6–4 win over the Chicago Blackhawks, recording three hits in just over four minutes of ice time. He was reassigned to the Moose the following day.

==== Los Angeles Kings (2024–2026) ====
As a free agent at the conclusion of his contract with the Jets, Malott was signed to a two-year, $1.55 million contract with the Los Angeles Kings on July 1, 2024.

==== Anaheim Ducks (2026–present) ====
After a two-year tenure with the Kings, Malott left as a free agent and was signed to a three-year, $5.55 million contract with divisional rival club, Anaheim Ducks, on July 1, 2026.

== Personal life ==
Malott's older brother Mike Malott is a mixed martial arts fighter and coach who joined the Ultimate Fighting Championship in February 2022.

== Career statistics ==
			Regular season					Playoffs
Season	Team	League	GP	G	A	Pts	PIM	GP	G	A	Pts	PIM
2013–14	Caledonia Corvairs	GOJHL	48	15	19	34	29	14	4	5	9	38
2014–15	Brooks Bandits	AJHL	53	6	14	20	88	20	2	2	4	10
2015–16	Brooks Bandits	AJHL	46	25	35	60	70	13	4	8	12	6
2016–17	Cornell University	ECAC	30	6	3	9	40	—	—	—	—	—
2017–18	Cornell University	ECAC	28	6	11	17	56	—	—	—	—	—
2018–19	Cornell University	ECAC	27	6	8	14	27	—	—	—	—	—
2019–20	Cornell University	ECAC	29	6	7	13	12	—	—	—	—	—
2020–21	Manitoba Moose	AHL	34	14	6	20	35	—	—	—	—	—
2020–21	Florida Everblades	ECHL	4	1	0	1	0	—	—	—	—	—
2021–22	Manitoba Moose	AHL	62	23	18	41	55	5	1	0	1	0
2021–22	Winnipeg Jets	NHL	1	0	0	0	2	—	—	—	—	—
2022–23	Manitoba Moose	AHL	71	23	21	44	82	5	1	0	1	14
2023–24	Manitoba Moose	AHL	70	22	30	52	66	2	0	0	0	0
2024–25	Ontario Reign	AHL	61	23	28	51	80	—	—	—	—	—
2024–25	Los Angeles Kings	NHL	12	0	1	1	7	6	0	0	0	0
2025–26	Los Angeles Kings	NHL	58	3	6	9	55	4	0	0	0	14
NHL totals			71	3	7	10	64	10	0	0	0	14
