= Grindstone Creek (Hamilton Harbour) =

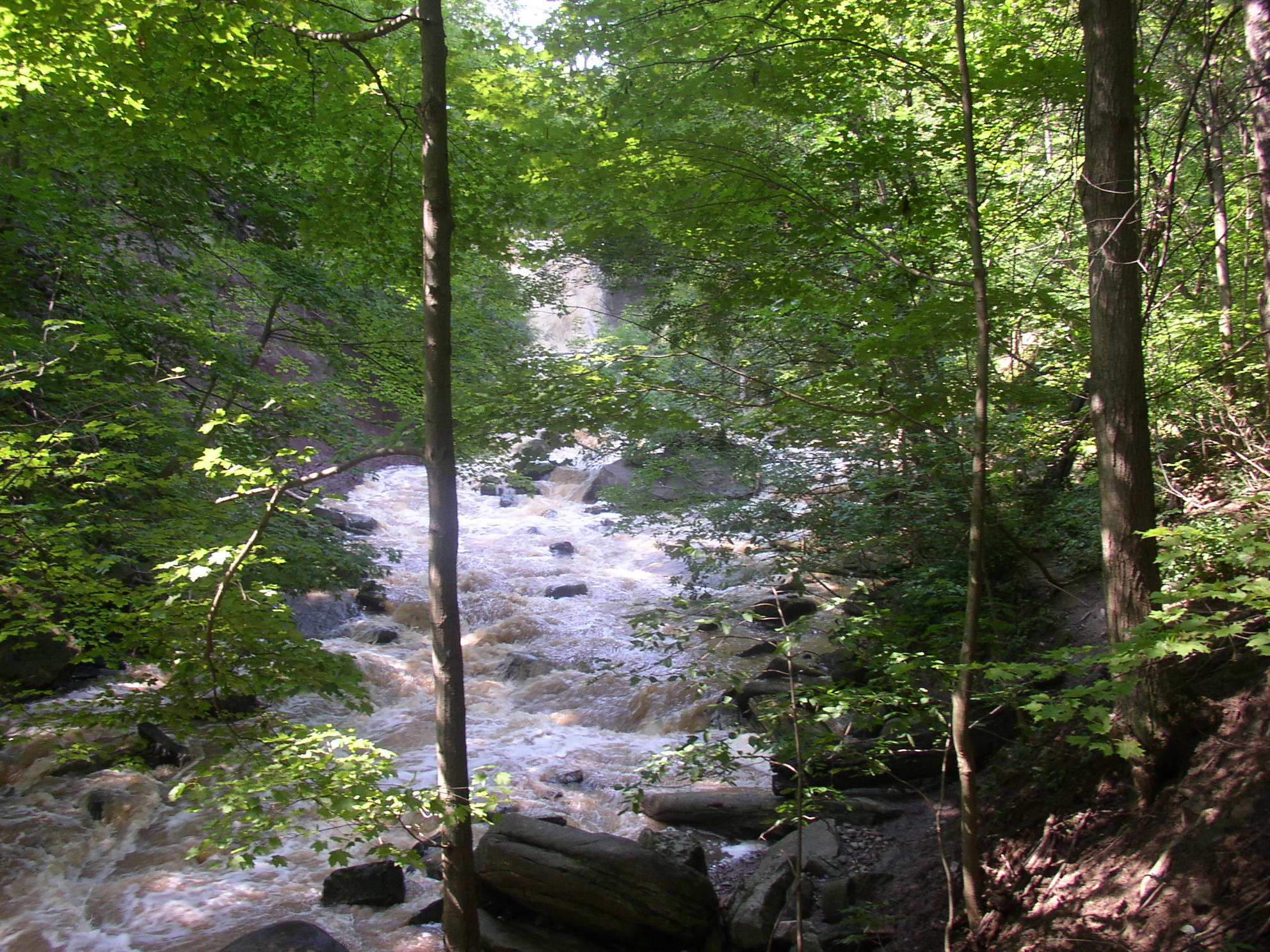
- Grindstone Creek flowing over the Niagara Escarpment at the Boundary Falls

- Location of the mouth of Grindstone Creek in Southern Ontario

Location
- Country: Canada
- Province: Ontario
- Region: Greater Toronto and Hamilton Area
- Municipalities: Burlington; Hamilton

Physical characteristics
- Source: Lake Medad
  - location: Burlington, Regional Municipality of Halton
  - coordinates: 43°22′09″N 79°53′23″W
  - elevation: 243 m (797 ft)
- Mouth: Lake Ontario
  - location: Burlington, Regional Municipality of Halton
  - coordinates: 43°17′25″N 79°52′59″W
  - elevation: 74 m (243 ft)

Basin features
- River system: Great Lakes Basin

Grindstone Creek is a stream in the Greater Toronto and Hamilton Area, Ontario, Canada. It is in the Great Lakes Basin and is a tributary of Lake Ontario at the western end of the lake.

The creek begins Lake Medad in the city of Burlington, Regional Municipality of Halton. It flows west immediately into the unitary city of Hamilton. The creek turns southwest into the community of Waterdown, and flows over the Niagara Escarpment at Boundary Falls. It re-enters Burlington at the community of Aldershot, turns west, and reaches its mouth at Hamilton Harbour on Lake Ontario, adjacent to the Royal Botanical Gardens.

== See also ==
- List of rivers of Ontario
