= Hamilton-Oshawa Port Authority =

- Interactive map of Hamilton-Oshawa Port Authority

Location
- Country: Canada
- Location: Hamilton, Ontario
- Coordinates: 43.2722°N 79.8624°W
- UN/LOCODE: CAHAM/CAOSH

Details
- Opened: 1912
- Size: 620 acres (250 ha)
- No. of berths: 32
- Draft depth: 8.2 m.
- Employees: ~50
- President and CEO: Ian Hamilton

Statistics
- Annual cargo tonnage: 11.46 million metric tons (FY 2024)
- Annual revenue: CDN$26.4 million (FY 2017)
- Net income: CDN$5.3 million (FY 2017)
- Website www.hopaports.ca

The Hamilton-Oshawa Port Authority (HOPA) is a port authority which owns and operates ports in the cities of Hamilton and Oshawa, Ontario, Canada. The Authority was created in 2019 when the Hamilton Port Authority and the Oshawa Port Authority were merged by the Government of Canada. The amalgamated port authority replaced the Oshawa Port Authority created in 2012 and the Hamilton Port Authority which succeeded the Hamilton Harbour Commission in 2001. The Port of Hamilton, located in Hamilton Harbour, is Ontario's largest and among the busiest ports in Canada.

One of 17 Canadian port authorities created by the federal government, Hamilton-Oshawa derives its mandate from the Canada Marine Act.

== History ==
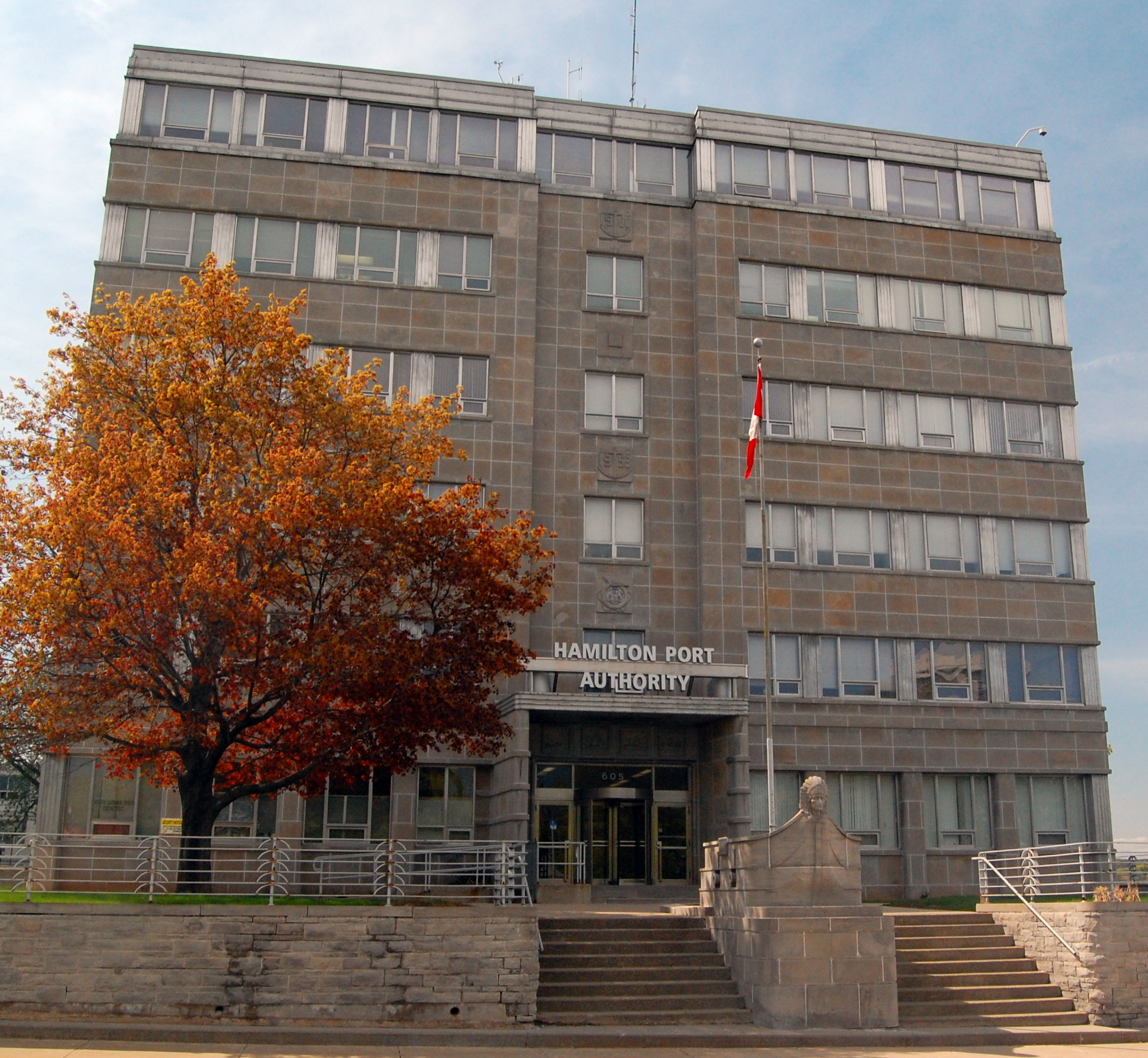
Completed in 1953, Hamilton Port Authority Building is an example of Art Deco architecture in Hamilton. The building is complemented by Art Deco sculptures by Louis Temporale.

On April 1, 1912, an Act of Parliament created the Hamilton Harbour Commissioners (HHC) and on May 1, 1912, the first three Harbour Commissioners, George J. Guy, Hugh S. Wallace and William J. Clark took their oaths of office.

The Port of Hamilton grew throughout the 20th century, in service to Hamilton's two major steel producers, Steel Company of Canada, and Dominion Steel Castings Company, as well as Hamilton's robust manufacturing economy.

The long-awaited completion of the Welland Ship Canal in 1932 brought a tremendous boost in shipping to Hamilton industry. Anticipating the arrival of larger Great Lakes vessels and ocean freighters, the Commissioners had already widened and deepened the canal entrance from Lake Ontario into Hamilton Harbour. In order to accommodate the huge ore and coal ships which now had direct access to Harbour waters, the Steel Company of Canada and the Hamilton By-Product Coke Ovens constructed larger docks. The result: between 1929 and 1934 total tonnage in the harbour doubled from one to two million tonnes annually, making Hamilton the fourth-busiest port in the country, behind Montreal, Vancouver and Toronto.

When the St. Lawrence Seaway opened in 1959, the first ship travelling up the new system berthed in Hamilton. Cargo tonnage after the first year of Seaway operation was higher in Hamilton than at any other Canadian or American Port on the Great Lakes.

A Hamilton Harbour Police Shore Patrol shoulder patch worn by officers

The Hamilton Harbour Police was formed in 1921 to provide policing services for the Hamilton Harbour Commission in Hamilton. It was disbanded in 1986 and its duties were transferred to the Hamilton-Wentworth Regional Police.

== Mandate ==
Under the Canada Marine Act and the port authority's letters patent it is tasked with facilitating the regional economy and managing port lands in an environmentally and financially sustainable way to support the regional and national economy.

== Facilities ==
=== Port of Hamilton ===
The Port of Hamilton houses multiple terminal operations providing storage and transloading of dry bulk and liquid bulk commodities, breakbulk and project cargo. The port is served by two stevedores: Federal Marine Terminals and Great Lakes Stevedoring. It is also serviced by two Class-1 North American railways: Canadian National and Canadian Pacific.

The Port of Hamilton is divided between the west harbour on piers 8 to 15 which house among other facilities a large fuel depot, an agri-food cluster on pier 10 and the east harbour on piers 22 to 29 which have multiple agri-food terminals. The port has a grain storage capacity of 100,000 tonnes, a liquid bulk capacity of 200,000 tonnes spread across 125 liquid bulk tanks, 2.5 million square feet of warehouse space, 15 wharves and 8.4 km of St. Lawrence Seaway maximum depth dock walls.

=== Port of Oshawa ===
The Port of Oshawa is serviced by Oshawa Stevedores and has a rail spur to the CN mainline a kilometre or two north of the harbour. The port is divided between a West Wharf and a St. Lawrence Seaway depth East Wharf which handles many of the same commodities Hamilton does.

In comparison to the Port of Hamilton the Port of Oshawa is quite small. The port's storage facilities include 75,000 square feet of warehouse space, a liquid bulk capacity of about 25,000 tonnes and a dry bulk capacity of 60,000 tonnes in 5 domes and a grain silo.

Shortly after amalgamation of the two ports, HOPA Ports CEO Ian Hamilton signalled "dredging, building a ring road, reinforcing the dock wall ... [and creating] a second berth so two ships can be unloaded at the same time" are critical short-term investments for long term growth in Oshawa.

== Cargo ==
The Port of Hamilton handles a diversified mix of cargoes including:

- Asphalt
- Biofuels
- Bitumen
- Cement clinker
- Coal & coke
- Dry & liquid fertilizer
- Edible oils
- Grain, pulses & beans (Corn, wheat, soybeans, canola)
- Gypsum
- Iron ore
- Petroleum
- Potash
- Rum
- Salt
- Sand & gravel
- Scrap metal
- Sugar

In 2006 the Hamilton Port Authority handled 10,282,978 tonnes of steel industry inputs and products which amounted to 79% of the port's tonnage. From 2006 to 2018 the share of tonnage related to the steel industry steadily declined but began stabilizing around 2013 in the 6 to 7 million tonne range. In 2018 the port handled 7,185,596 tonnes of steel industry product which represented 61% of total port tonnage.

During the decline in the steel industry after the Great Recession of 2008 the port diversified and has seen significant growth in the agri-food industry which has necessitated the construction of a number of food processing and storage facilities in the port. From 2006 to 2018 agricultural products passing through the port grew from 492,272 tonnes to 3,512,444 tonnes. Agri-food has grown from 3–4% of port tonnage in 2006 to 31% of total port traffic in 2023.

As population growth in the Greater Golden Horseshoe continues in the coming decades the port could see significant growth in agri-food business. In June 2019 Sucro Sourcing opened the first sugar refinery in Canada since 1958. The plant is located on Pier 10 and imports inputs from sugarcane producing regions. Plans for a second Sucro refinery were announced in 2024. The second refinery has the capacity to refine one million tonnes of sugar a year.

A 2010 study by Martin and Associates revealed that cargo transiting the Port of Hamilton is connected to $6 billion in economic activity and 38,000 jobs in the province of Ontario.

== Tonnage ==
=== Hamilton Cargo by Type ===
While comparatively small components of the Port of Hamilton's shipping business, the port has seen significant declines in its breakbulk and liquid bulk business from highs in the early 2000s. Partial recovery has occurred in the breakbulk category with relatively consistent annual increases from 2009 to 2018 but liquid bulk tonnage (chemicals, fuels, etc.) in 2018 was 62.5% of what it was in 2006.

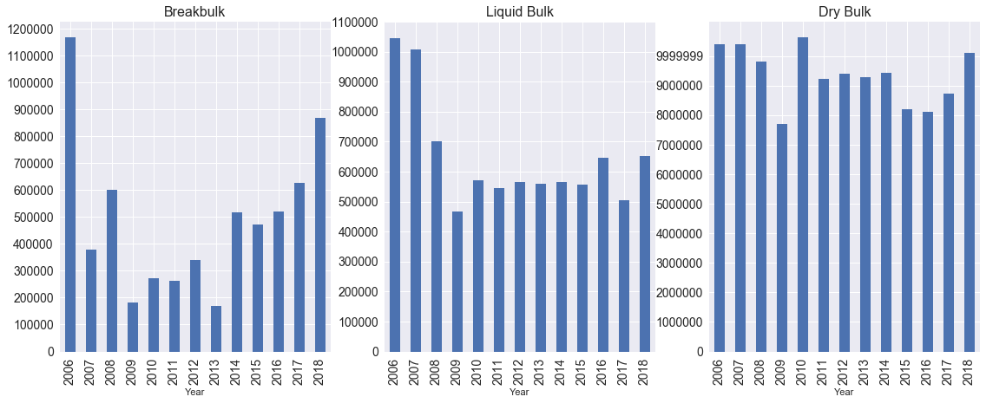

=== Expanding International Market Share ===
Reflecting decline in some domestic industry and the increased importance of international markets, overseas shipping has represented a greater share of Hamilton's shipping business reaching 20 year highs from 2014 to 2018.

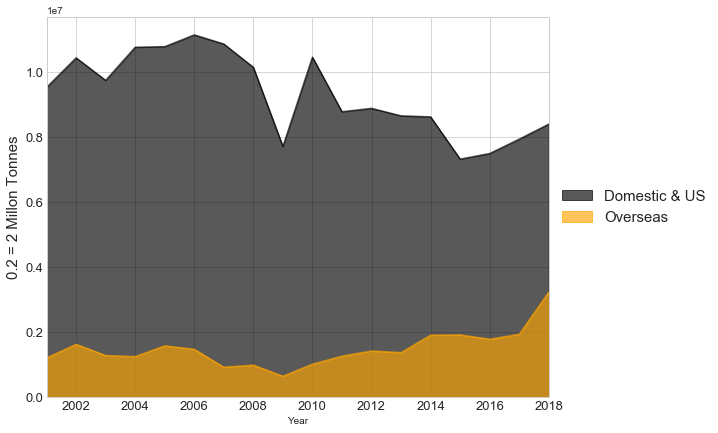

=== HOPA Ports Annual Cargo Tonnage ===
In its first year of amalgamation with HOPA Ports the Port of Oshawa had its best reported year since at least 2007 handling 575,000 tonnes.

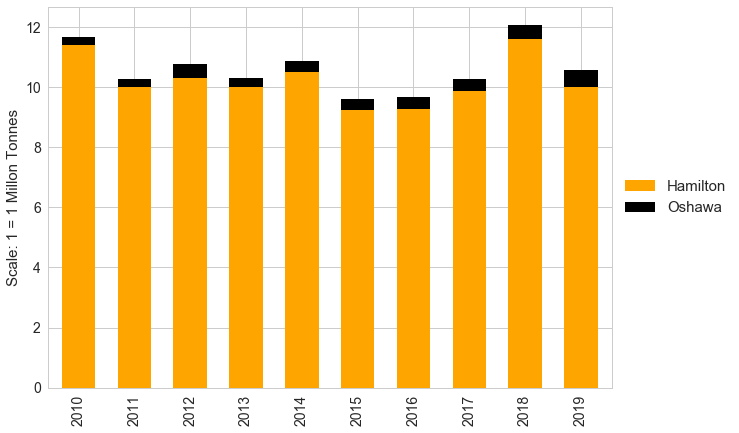

== Cruise ships ==
Cruise ships have been an on and off feature of Hamilton over the years. From 2010 to at least 2012 Blount Small Ship Adventures made multiple visits annually on their cruise between New York City and Toronto with the MV Grand Mariner. In 2020 the Great Lakes Cruising Company ran a cruise between Chicago and Hamilton on the MV Victory I.

== Great Lakes maritime trade ==
The Port of Hamilton is the primary commercial port in the Golden Horseshoe. In 2017 the Golden Horseshoe's other federally governed commercial ports handled less than 3 million tonnes combined as the Port of Toronto handled 2,172,750 tonnes of cargo while the Port of Oshawa handled 408,567 tonnes. By tonnage Hamilton and Oshawa combined are about 6 times the size of the Port of Toronto. Hamilton is also the busiest port in Ontario and the 7th busiest port on the Great Lakes. In 2017 Hamilton was also the 7th busiest Canadian port authority behind Vancouver, Montreal, Saint John, Quebec City, Prince Rupert and Sept-Iles.

Like many major Great Lakes ports Hamilton is a bulk and breakbulk port. It imports/exports large project cargo components such as windmill blades and handles salt, agri-food commodities, fertilizers, fuels and assorted inputs and finished product for the steel industry. In comparison to the Port of Thunder Bay, Ontario's second busiest port, Hamilton is much more reliant on the steel industry than Thunder Bay which relies on agricultural commodities from the Prairies. In 2018 approximately 60% of Hamilton's tonnage was steel industry inputs and products and 85% of Thunder Bay's tonnage was Prairie grains.

As a freshwater, regional port still largely dominated by one industry, Hamilton does not rank with major North American ports such as Houston, Long Beach–Los Angeles, Vancouver, New York–New Jersey, the southern Mississippi River ports and even major inland ports like the Twin Ports in Duluth. In 2017 it had a similar volume to the smallest of the top 50 busiest ports in the United States.

=== Busiest Great Lakes ports ===
	Port	Tonnage	Year	Prov/State
1.	Duluth-Superior	30,277,995	2017	Minnesota-Wisconsin
2.	Chicago	16,423,651	2017	Illinois
3.	Two Harbors	15,431,524	2017	Minnesota
4.	Detroit	13,266,629	2017	Michigan
5.	Cleveland	13,147,350	2017	Ohio
6.	Indiana-Burns Harbor	12,216,800	2017	Indiana
7.	Hamilton	11,628,318	2018	Ontario
8.	Toledo	9,619,723	2017	Ohio
9.	Mount Vernon	9,118,896	2017	Indiana
10.	Thunder Bay	8,734,931	2018	Ontario

=== Hamilton and Short Sea Container Shipping ===
Beginning in the early 2000s the Port of Hamilton began investigating the viability of a variety of shipping routes to allow the port to expand into regular, containerized short sea shipping between producers and consumers in the Golden Horseshoe and the Port of Montreal and Port of Halifax. The port sees short sea shipping as a way to capture a share of the growth in regional road and rail shipping to and from eastern Canadian container ports. In 2015 27% of the Port of Montreal's expanding container shipping volume came from or was destined for Ontario with much of the trade volume shipped by transport truck down Highway 401. With increased Canada–Europe trade as a result of the Comprehensive Economic and Trade Agreement, the development of larger container vessels and expansion of deep sea ports in the Maritimes "interlined" shipping to/from Halifax, Port of Saint John, and, if developed, Port of Sydney, Nova Scotia, and inland Great Lakes ports including Hamilton could become viable.

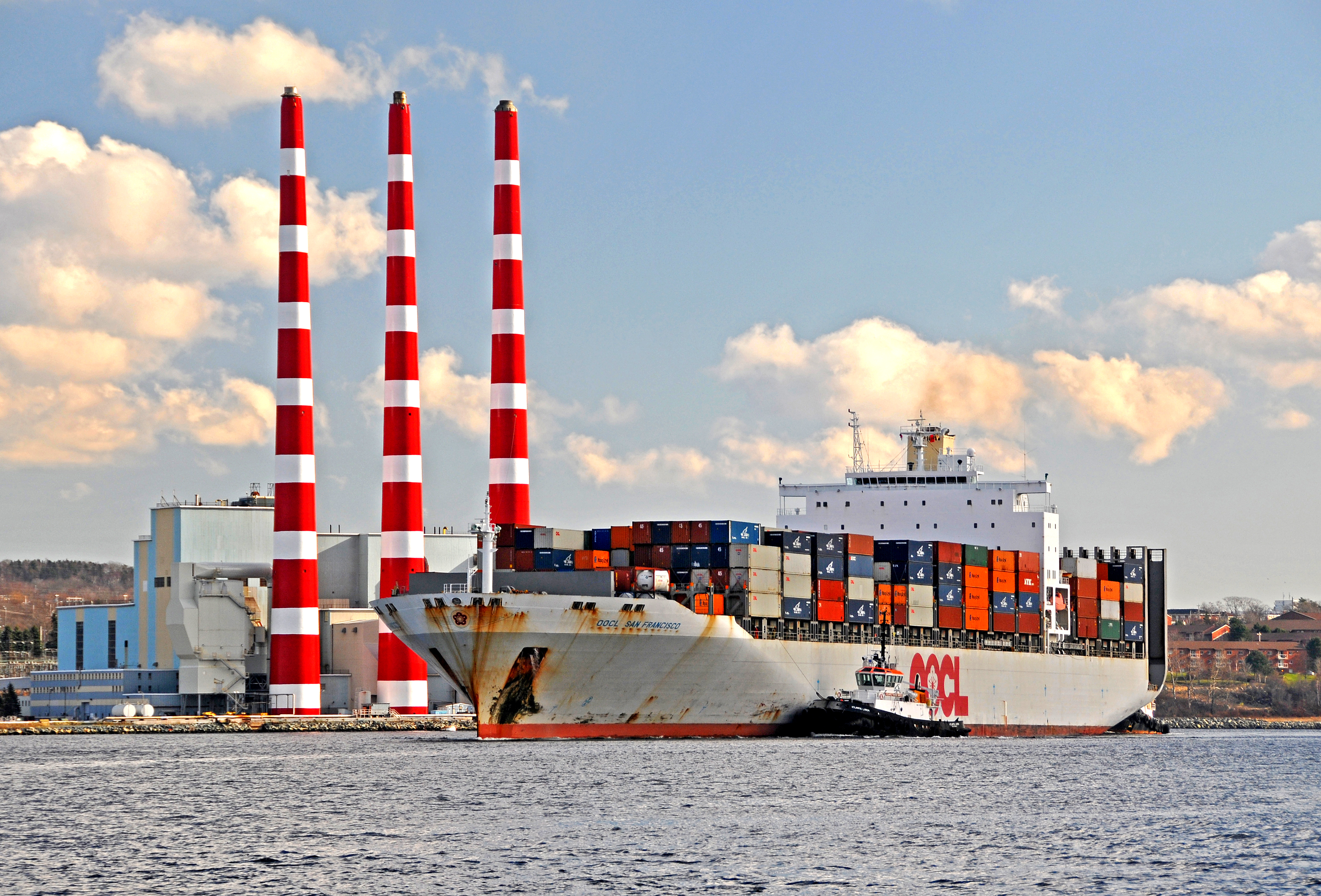
Small container ship (~5500 TEUs) in Halifax Harbour which exceeds St. Lawrence Seawaymax limits

There is a significant public interest in increasing the role of short sea shipping in regional logistics. The public interest includes (1) reducing greenhouse gas emissions, (2) lessening traffic congestion on Highway 401 particularly between Montreal and Toronto and (3) maximizing capacity utilization of existing infrastructure, the St. Lawrence Seaway, which is currently only operating at about 50% capacity. In a report submitted in February 2019 to the Canadian Parliament entitled "Establishing a Canadian Transportation and Logistics Strategy" recommendations included increasing usage of the seaway to reduce transportation bottlenecks.

As of 2019, regular short sea container shipping between Hamilton and eastern Canadian, deep water ports has not been realized. However, most major ports in the Great Lakes-St. Lawrence Seaway system continue to advance the idea of short sea shipping generally, through initiatives such as the Highway H_{2}O marketing campaign, as most Great Lakes ports see potential for an increased, less commodity/industry specific role in regional logistics for marine traffic. Increasingly, government is also seeing the role increased regional maritime shipping can play in offsetting pressure on other infrastructure such as Highway 401 by allowing underutilized infrastructure such as the seaway to capture a greater share of the modal split between major, inter-provincial population centres.

== Controversies ==
Ports operated by federal port authorities – as strategic infrastructure – are tasked with facilitating regional economic growth while being financially self-sufficient. Municipalities on the other hand are responsible for local economic growth and are directly accountable to local communities. As a result, it is not uncommon for port authority's to come into conflict with municipal political leadership whose interests are more local in nature. This is demonstrated in the Port of Oshawa's 2012 Land Use Plan where the authority states "the City Official Plan will be considered, however, where there is a discrepancy between [the port authority] Land Use Plan and the City's Official Plan this Plan shall apply." In other words, municipal planning principles and goals are simply a consideration for federal ports.

=== Merger of Hamilton and Oshawa Port Authorities ===
When the merger was announced there were of variety of views regarding amalgamation. According to Canadian Minister of Transportation, Marc Garneau, through a release from his office the merger will:

"Strengthen economic opportunity in the region and will enable a coordinated approach to port development and contribute to broadening multimodal transportation options in the Greater Toronto Area."

However, a variety of municipal and provincial politicians from Hamilton and Oshawa expressed concern over the implications of the merger. Ontario's Minister of Environment, Jeff Yurek, stated "there is simply no evidence to give reason to believe [the port merger] can possibly meet [the federal government's] stated goals of strengthening Ontario's supply chain and improving port efficiencies and planning in the region." Oshawa Mayor Dan Carter expressed concern around the influence of the Port of Hamilton in a merged port authority given its relative size and distance from Oshawa. According to Carter, "I think that it's important that it's not just Hamilton that has all the voice. I think it's important both of them have an equal voice at the table if we're going to have a healthy relationship." By contrast Hamilton Mayor Fred Eisenberger said "the combination of the two port authorities would allow the new entity to boost growth and improve southern Ontario's access to global markets."

=== Port Authority and Municipal Jurisdiction ===
There have also been jurisdiction and capacity issues around the port. In 2013 a controversy was triggered when no organization in Hamilton was available to fight a highly visible marine fire. According to CBC News, neither Hamilton Fire Services or Hamilton Police Service thought they had a mandate to fight marine fires. The port authority had once operated a tugboat with some firefighting ability, but the vessel was no longer operational.

=== Land Acquisition ===
The port authority manages 620 acres of waterfront industrial property in Hamilton; however, it is running out of land to advance its financial and economic mandate. In October 2013 former President of the Hamilton Port Authority Bruce Wood publicly mused that if US Steel (Stelco) was going to close its last steel mill in Hamilton it was an opportunity for the port authority to buy the 328 hectares (810 acres) Stelco occupies and re-purpose it to create new jobs on the brownfields.

HOPA's vision of land use in support of facilitating trade and the regional economy while being financially sustainable has clashed with the visions of some residents and municipal politicians. Mayor Fred Eisenberger made it known he wants potential brownfield sites in the harbour to be used "for advanced manufacturing and job producing production" indicating some skepticism of the labour intensity and value of port jobs to the city. This is evidenced by the fact Dofasco has around 5,000 employees on 800 acres of land where port authority tenants employ about 2,100 on 620 acres of land. In spite of some opposition from Hamilton's Mayor, Bruce Wood's successor Ian Hamilton has also been vocal in signalling that the port authority will be pursuing surplus steel lands should they be sold by US Steel successor Bedrock Industries in opposition to the Mayor's desire to purchase the lands to give the city control over what would otherwise be federal lands.

In Oshawa, HOPA Ports has also been competing with the municipality for land. On November 15, 2019, the port authority began the purchase of a site adjacent to its property which once housed a fuel depot operated by Petrocor. The City of Oshawa then issued a notice of expropriation for the site in December 2019 as the port authority was working through a purchase. Unlike in Hamilton the question isn't simply the type or number of jobs or the implications of federal ownership. Rather, the City of Oshawa and many local politicians do not want any port employment uses to the west or north of port property so as to preserve property for recreational uses.

=== Land Use ===
Hamilton Harbour has a long history of being a centre of heavy industrial activity dating back over a century. The byproduct of this industrial activity, through eras with lower environmental standards, has been significant pollution perhaps most clearly demonstrated by Randle Reef which is listed as an area of environmental concern by the International Joint Commission. As a result of some of the negative byproducts the city's industrial history and a desire to cleanup the local environment and reputation there was significant opposition to a port leaseholder's proposal to build a waste gasification facility on Pier 15.

In Oshawa, similar conflict occurred between HOPA's predecessor – the Oshawa Port Authority – and local residents and municipal politicians. In Oshawa's case an ethanol company, FarmTech, had agreed with the port authority to build an ethanol facility on port lands. However, after failing to allow the facility to move forward due to significant local opposition, the port authority had to pick up the cheque for a 4 million dollar arbitration award that was awarded against them. The result called into question the short-term financial viability of the port as they were found to have almost 6 million dollars in total liabilities.

There has also been long-standing local opposition to the port, or at least its economic development mandate, due to its proximity to neighbouring Second Marsh and position between two conservation areas. The City of Oshawa and the port have been in a long running battle, ostensibly, over the extension of Harbour Road and the maintenance of a property buffer on port lands between port industrial/logistics uses and Second Marsh.

=== Land Access ===
As a result of the prime, waterfront real estate federal ports occupy there is high local demand for access whether to port property or adjacent properties which can be affected by port activity.

In Hamilton local Councillors and environmental organizations have sought public access to Sherman Inlet. The Hamilton Port Authority had initially agreed to grant public access in 2007 but for security reasons later changed their position.

In Oshawa the local community has had long-standing access to the West Wharf pier. However, in 2017, a tugboat positioning a freighter on the West Wharf had to release its fixed line which hit the pier, ripped of the railing and could have seriously injured or killed people who were on the pier at the time. After an initial period of closure due to public safety and liability concerns the pier was fully reopened to the public in 2018.

In order to address the issue of community waterfront access HOPA is currently in the midst of a public engagement process for Fisherman's Wharf in Hamilton. The port is engaging the public to develop plans to reconceive Fisherman's Wharf.

== Environmental initiatives ==
=== Randle Reef ===
Randle Reef is an area in Hamilton Harbour adjacent to piers 14 and 15 which is approximately 60 hectares in size or about the size of 120 football fields. It consists of large amounts of coal tar which has high concentrations of carcinogenic polycyclic aromatic hydrocarbons. The reef is a product of over a century of heavy industrial activity as well as lax environmental regulation and enforcement which allowed heavy industry to dump industrial waste directly into the harbour. The total "mass" of coal tar in Hamilton Harbour exceeds Sydney Tar Ponds by about 200,000 tonnes.

In order to address pollution in Hamilton Harbour caused by Randle Reef HOPA Ports has teamed up with government partners, primarily the Government of Canada, the province of Ontario and the City of Hamilton, to build a $140 million Engineered Containment Facility. The containment facility is designed to capture the industrial waste for a period of 200 years. Scheduled to be completed in 2022 the 7 hectare containment facility will be converted to port uses and could lead to Hamilton Harbour being removed as an Area of Concern by the International Joint Commission.

=== Sherman Inlet ===
Sherman Inlet is a wetland located between pier 14 and pier 15. In the early 2000s it was infilled but in 2017 Hamilton Port Authority began a process of rehabilitating the inlet which is one of the few remaining inlets which dominated Hamilton Harbour prior to 20th century harbour infill. Efforts have included shoreline reconstruction and the introduction of bee hives to help pollinate the area.
