= Hamilton Harbour =

Bay in western Lake Ontario, Ontario, Canada

Coordinates: 43.2900°N 79.8350°W

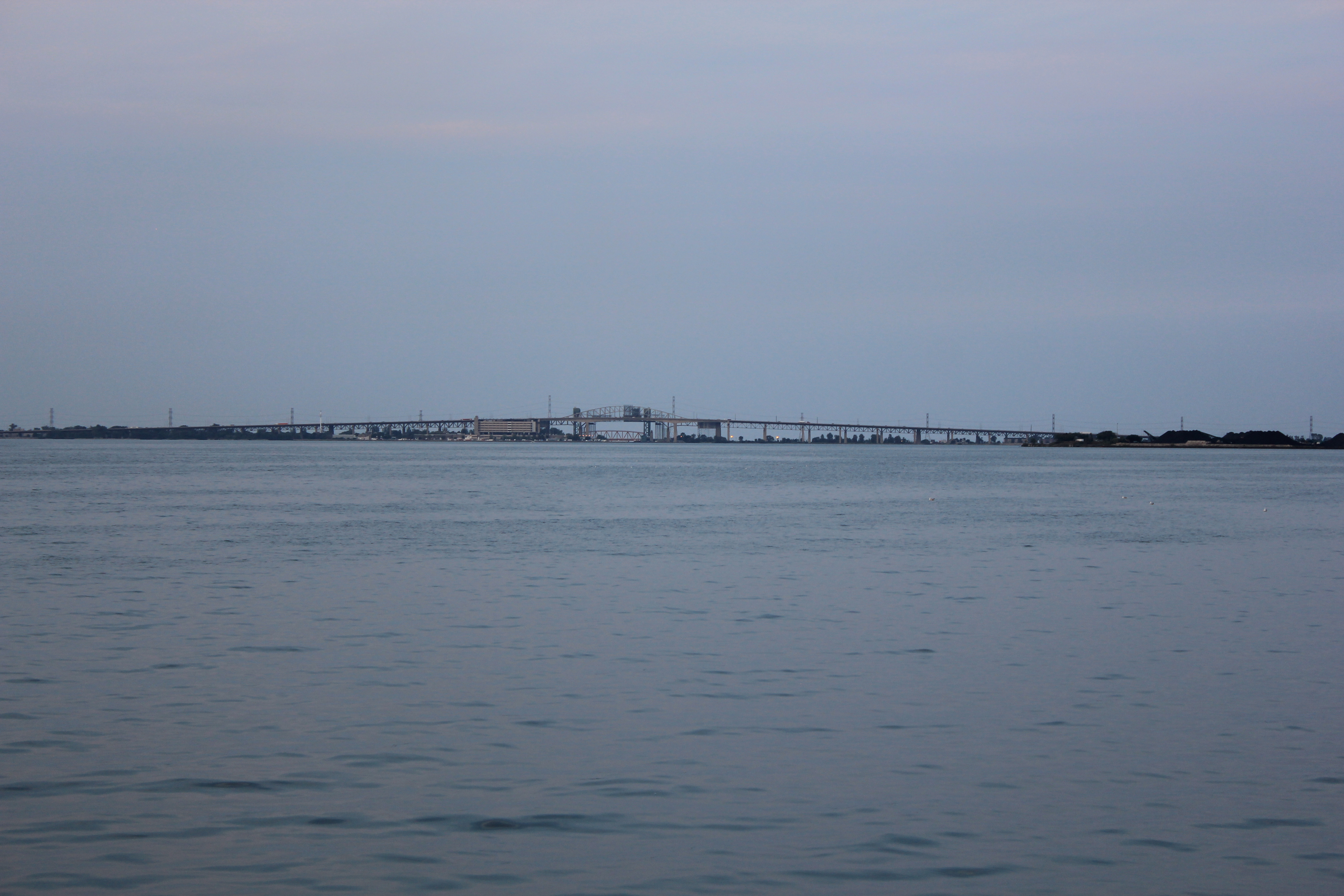
- View from Cootes Paradise Fishway looking towards the Burlington Bay James N. Allan Skyway.

- Location within Ontario Location within Canada Location within North America
- Type: Harbour
- Primary inflows: Spencer Creek; Grindstone Creek; Redhill Creek
- Primary outflows: Lake Ontario
- Basin countries: Canada
- Surface area: 500 km^{2} (190 sq mi)
- Average depth: 13 m (43 ft)
- Max. depth: 25 m (82 ft)
- Water volume: 79,000,000 m^{3} (2.8×10^{9} cu ft)
- Shore length^{1}: 45 km (28 mi)
- ^{1} Shore length is not a well-defined measure.

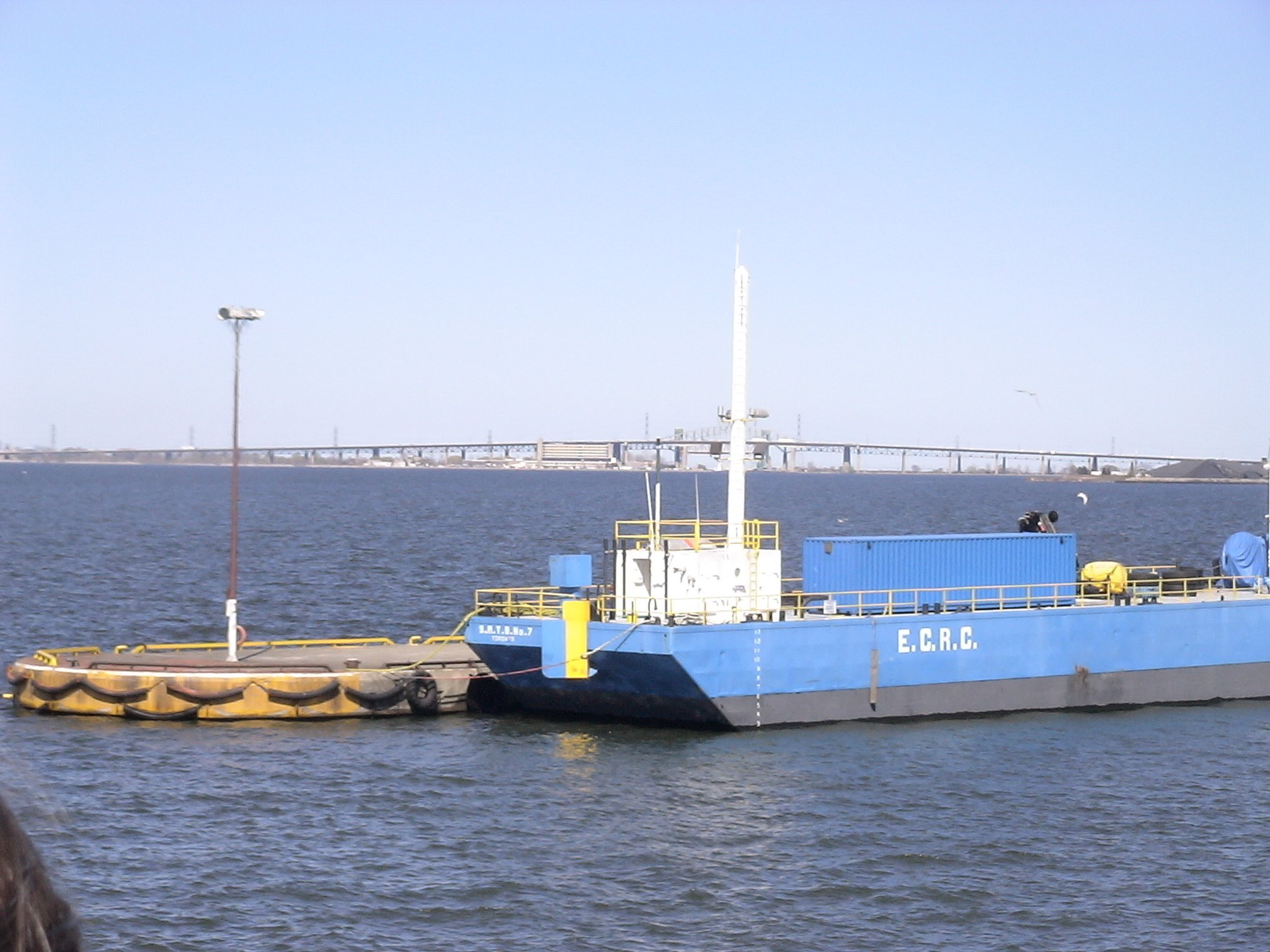
The Burlington Bay James N. Allan Skyway bridges the waters of Hamilton Harbour.

Hamilton Harbour (formerly known as Burlington Bay) lies on the western tip of Lake Ontario, bounded on the northwest by the City of Burlington, on the south by the City of Hamilton, and on the east by Hamilton Beach (south of the Burlington Bay James N. Allan Skyway) and Burlington Beach (north of the channel). It is joined to Cootes Paradise by a narrow channel formerly excavated for the Desjardins Canal. Within Hamilton itself, it is referred to as "Hamilton Harbour", "The Harbour" and "The Bay". The bay is naturally separated from Lake Ontario by a sand bar. The opening in the north end was filled in and channel cut in the middle for ships to pass. The Port of Hamilton is on the south side of the harbour.

== History ==
Hamilton Harbour was known among the Mississauga Anishinaabek as Wiikwedong simply meaning "at the Bay".

Early Settlers to the area called the bay Lake Geneva. The bay was formally renamed Burlington Bay in 1792 by John Graves Simcoe, the first lieutenant governor of Upper Canada, for the former name of the town of Bridlington in the East Riding of Yorkshire, England. Prior to this, the bay was also known as Washquarter, notably as a landmark to delineate the extent of the Between the Lakes Treaty No. 3 negotiated between Simcoe and the Mississaugas of the Credit First Nation in 1792.

Access to the bay was important for the early water transportation and industrial development of the area, including Dundas, Ontario, which had an early but ultimately unrealized lead over both Burlington (Brant's Block) and Hamilton. Over the years, the bay was roughly treated by its littoral residents. Constant infilling, particularly in the North End of Hamilton, damaged fresh water streams and the wildlife they supported. Channel dredging tended to stir up natural and unnatural sediments, further disrupting the ecological land balance in the area. Chemical, industrial and thermal pollution, especially as a byproduct of the burgeoning steel industry after the 1890s, continued to degrade the environment.

The waterways in Hamilton have not always been polluted. The north-end of the Harbour used to be a regular swimming spot for working-class families. The pollution of Hamilton Harbour waterways is caused by industrialization and, by proxy, urbanization, which came to be a major problem by 1917. Many working-class families were overcome by health hazards when dumping sewage into the inlets and the bay itself became a regular occurrence. Laurel Sefton MacDowell writes in her book An Environmental History of Canada that, "As early as the 1860s, a fishery inspector at Hamilton Harbour discovered that fish found along the shore tasted of coal oil and that dead ducks and muskrats were coated with oil from two refineries." By the 1950s, city officials had deemed Hamilton Harbour unfit for any recreation use and shut down all beaches.

In 1919, a Federal Order-In-Council changed the name of Burlington Bay to Hamilton Harbour.

By the 1970s, the International Joint Commission, which governs water usage in the Great Lakes Basin, and other agencies began to recognize the need for action. Greater water quality awareness, improved pollution controls, and an economic downturn all served to improve conditions in the 1980s. In the 1990s, beautification and ecological control were well underway. These measures included sealing the Lax Lands, contaminated with heavy metals and other pollutants, under a cap of clay; landscaping Bayfront Park and Pier 4 Park; and keeping common carp from entering Cootes Paradise. The visible and measurable improvement in water quality in Burlington Bay was showcased in 1994 by the very public swim of Sheila Copps, a local MP and federal cabinet minister. Access and recreational use of the bayfront has improved, but swimming is not allowed at two beaches in the harbour: Bayfront and Pier 4 due to consistent blue green algae.

Hamilton Harbour is listed as a Great Lakes Areas of Concern in The Great Lakes Water Quality Agreement between the United States and Canada. Part of the remediation plan is to reclaim the harbour's wetlands.

While most of the carp in the harbour had been eradicated by early 2021, Maclean's reported that numerous goldfish had been found, presumed to have come from the dumping of pet fish by the public. One expert stated that the goldfish "is the ultimate survivor of difficult conditions ... it can feed on blue-green algae blooms that native species cannot—blooms that appear with increasing frequency in Hamilton Harbour".

=== Randle Reef ===
Randle Reef, a site in the southeast corner of the harbour, is considered the most dire of identified water pollution issues awaiting remediation in Canada. The environmental containment facility, about 7.5 hectares in size, covers in-situ about 130,000 m^{3} of sediments contaminated with polycyclic aromatic hydrocarbons, and contain about 500,000 m^{3} of dredged PAH contaminated sediments. The containment facility was constructed in 2018 using two walls of steel sheet piling. Later in 2018, contaminated sediment surrounding the containment facility was dredged and placed inside the facility. The wastewater will be treated by an on-site water treatment system using sand filtration and granular activated adsorption and discharged back into the harbour. Last, an environmental cap will be built of layers of several materials including aggregates of various sizes, geotextile and geogrid, wickdrains, and surface materials (asphalt and/or concrete), placed sequentially from bottom to top in order to contain toxic sediment in the facility. The clean-up project had an estimated cost of $138.9 million, with the containment expected to have a 200-year lifespan. Environment and Climate Change Canada, and the Ontario Ministry of the Environment and Climate Change, each committed $46.3 million, with the final third of funding coming from the City of Hamilton ($14 million), the City of Burlington ($2.3 million), Halton Region ($2 million), the Hamilton Port Authority ($14 million), and Stelco ($14 million). On March 9, 2022, Environment and Climate Change Canada announced the completion of the clean-up project where over 615,000 m^{3} of contaminated sediment was managed. The final stage of the project, the installation of the environmental cap, will be completed by 2025, which will provide new port land that will be managed by the Hamilton–Oshawa Port Authority.

=== Stage 3 cap and site transition (2023–2025) ===
Stage 3 completes the engineered containment facility (ECF) and prepares the surface for future port use. The cap is a multi-layer system: base aggregates and geosynthetics support a drainage layer that collects porewater for on-site treatment before discharge, and a synthetic barrier isolates the contaminated sediments from clean cover layers above. In 2024, construction advanced with installation of more than 13,000 vertical wick drains and horizontal drainage strips to accelerate consolidation, followed by placement of base and anchor components of the cap. By late 2024, a preload of aggregate was placed across the surface to compress underlying materials; the preload is planned to remain for several months before the surface is paved in 2025.

Stage 3 delivery is led by Milestone Environmental Contracting in partnership with the Mississaugas of the Credit Business Corporation through a majority Indigenous-owned venture. Milestone Environmental Contracting Inc. Upon completion, responsibility for the finished facility will transfer to the Hamilton–Oshawa Port Authority as new port lands, integrating long-term risk containment with marine-industrial redevelopment.

Project partners describe the Randle Reef remediation as central to addressing beneficial-use impairments in the Hamilton Harbour Area of Concern and to progress toward eventual delisting, alongside complementary habitat restoration and wastewater upgrades around the harbour.

== Burlington Shipping Canal ==
The opening from Hamilton Harbour to Lake Ontario is referred to as the Burlington Shipping Canal. It was proposed in 1824 and opened in 1826.

Burlington Canal Lift Bridge is a lift bridge the spans over the canal.

== Infrastructure ==
The bay today is crossed by two highways: 403 & Queen Elizabeth Way (QEW). The Burlington Bay James N. Allan Skyway (nicknamed "The Skyway") bridge, part of the QEW, crosses the border between Hamilton Harbour and Lake Ontario. The 403, York Street and a number of railways cross Hamilton Harbour on a glacial sandbar (similar in formation to the present day beach strip to the east) and separates Cootes Paradise from Hamilton Harbour. The harbour also houses the Port of Hamilton which is the busiest Canadian Great Lakes port and handles in excess of 10 million tonnes of cargo per year.

== Legend ==
The bay is thought by some to host a North American cryptid, described by witnesses as a large snake-like creature. A diver drowned in the bay during the filming of a low-budget horror film titled Marina Monster on August 21, 2005.
