= Waterdown District High School =

Coordinates: 43.33466°N 79.91095°W

Location
- 215 Parkside Drive; Waterdown, Ontario L8B1B9; Canada

Information
- Type: Public
- Established: 1853
- School board: Hamilton-Wentworth District School Board
- Principal: Greg Clark
- Grades: 9–12
- Enrolment: 1,095 (2020–2021)
- Website: www.hwdsb.on.ca/waterdown/

Waterdown District High School is located at 215 Parkside Drive, Waterdown, Ontario, and is a member of the Hamilton-Wentworth District School Board.

== Background ==
A high school was first established in the Waterdown District in 1853.

Prior to the 2012 school year, the school saw a $23.9-million expansion of its facilities to accommodate new home construction.

In 2017, Waterdown teacher Rob Flosman won a Governor General's Award for creating a history museum inside of the school. The student-run museum opened in 2013 and contained over 700 artifacts.

== See also ==
- Education in Ontario
- List of secondary schools in Ontario
