= Waterdown, Ontario =

Community in Hamilton, Ontario

Waterdown
- Community (Dissolved village)
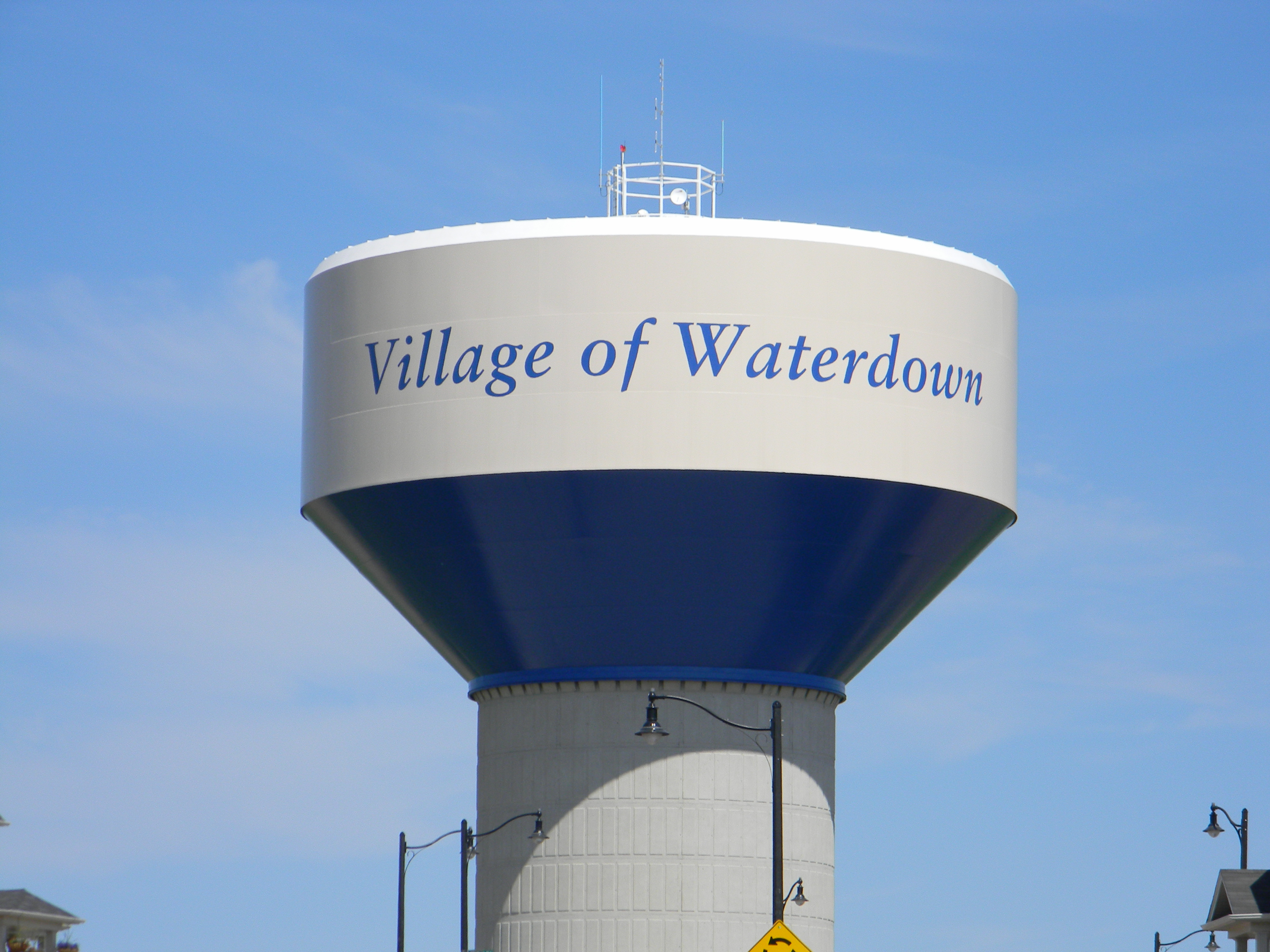
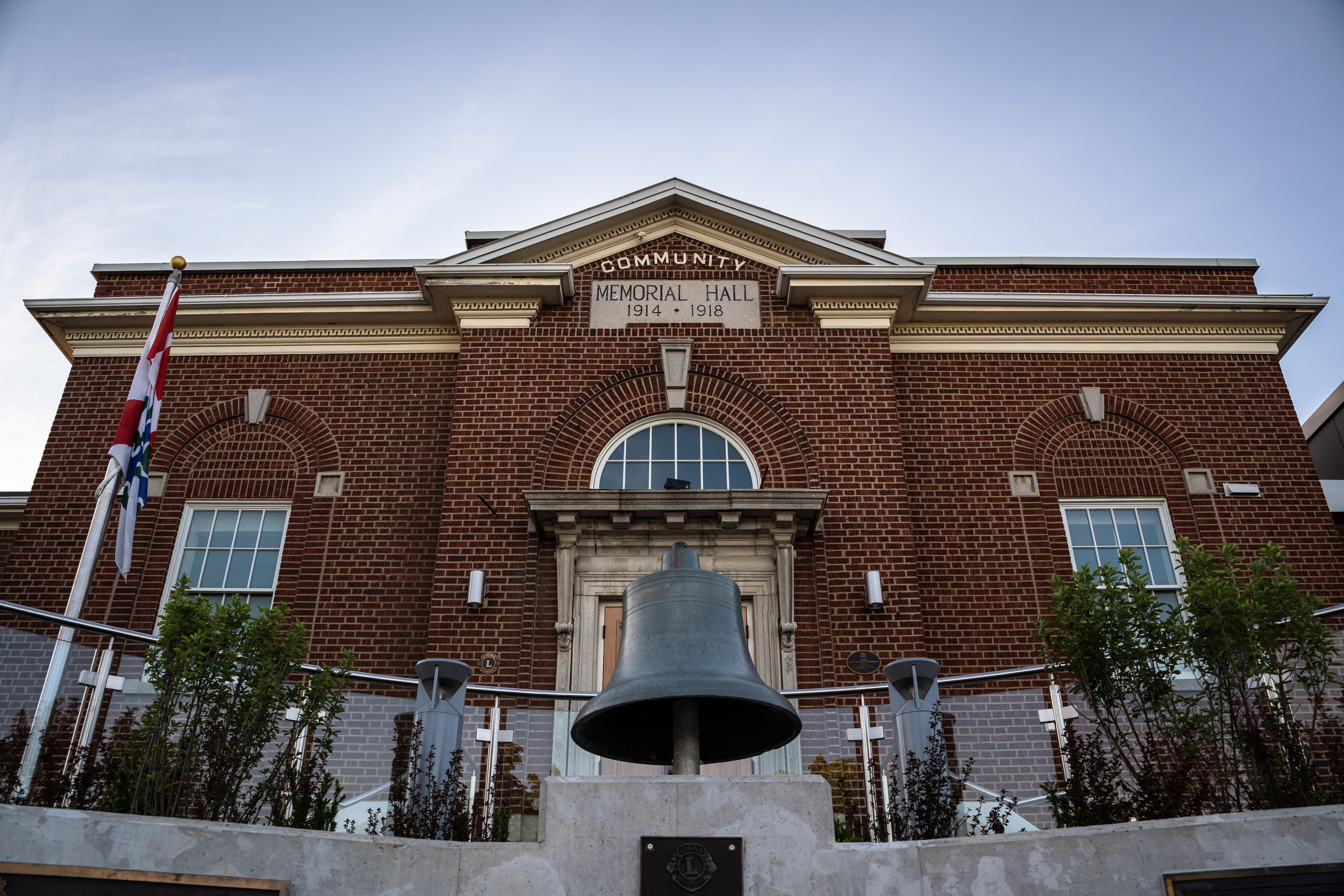
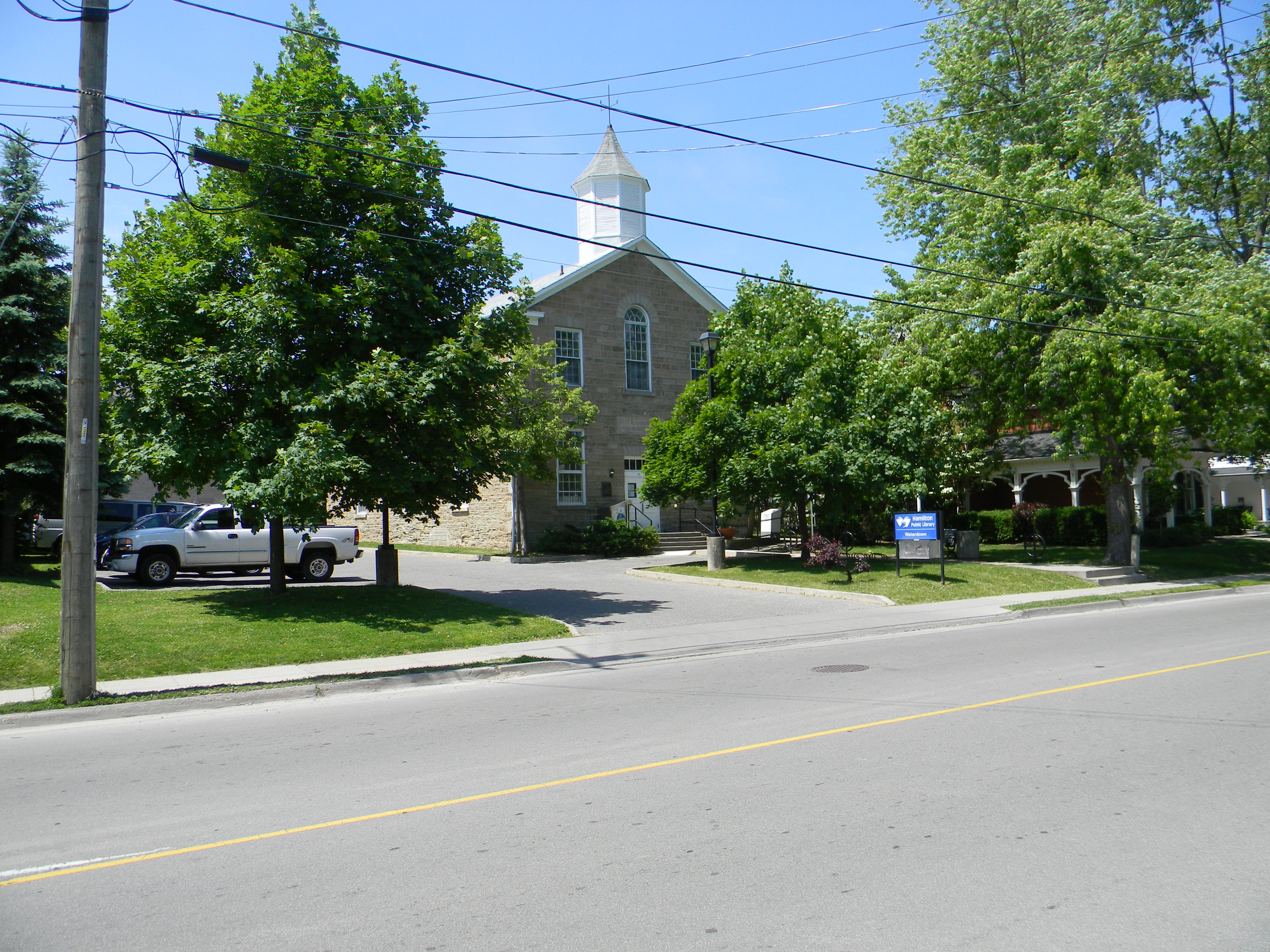
- Waterdown Water Tower Memorial Hall Former Public Library

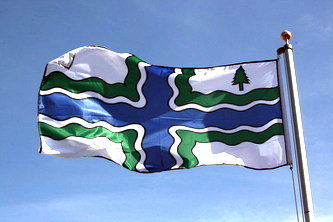
- Flag Coat of arms

- Location within City of Hamilton
- Coordinates: 43°20′N 79°53′W
- Country: Canada
- Province: Ontario
- City: Hamilton
- Incorporated: 1830; 196 years ago (village)
- Amalgamated: January 1, 1974; 52 years ago (Flamborough)
- Amalgamated: January 1, 2001; 25 years ago (Hamilton)
- Founder: Ebenezer Griffin

Government
  - MP: Dan Muys
  - MPP: Donna Skelly
- Time zone: UTC−05:00 (EST)
  - Summer (DST): UTC−04:00 (EDT)
- Forward sortation area: L0R and L9H
- Area codes: 905, 289, and 365

Waterdown is a community in the city of Hamilton in the Canadian province of Ontario. Waterdown is approximately 60 km west of downtown Toronto and, as of 2021, has a population of approximately 24,400 residents.

On January 1, 2001, the new city of Hamilton was formed from the amalgamation of six municipalities, Hamilton, Ancaster, Dundas, Flamborough, Glanbrook, and Stoney Creek. Before the amalgamation, the old city of Hamilton had 331,121 Hamiltonians divided into 100 neighbourhoods. The newly-amalgamated city had 490,268 people in over 200 neighbourhoods.

Waterdown was created from that part of East Flamborough Township on the edge of the Niagara Escarpment, just east of the junction of Dundas Street (Highway 5) and Highway 6, traditionally known as Clappison's Corners.

In 1974, the village was amalgamated with East Flamborough, West Flamborough and Beverly townships to form the Town of Flamborough. In 2001, Flamborough and five other municipalities were amalgamated into the City of Hamilton.

Waterdown has seen significant commercial development, including opening an expansive YMCA facility. Waterdown population growth was approximately 28.9% over the years 1996 and 2001. In 2012, the average house price in Waterdown was nearly $400,000.

Waterdown District High School (WDHS) expanded its facilities in 2012.

== History ==
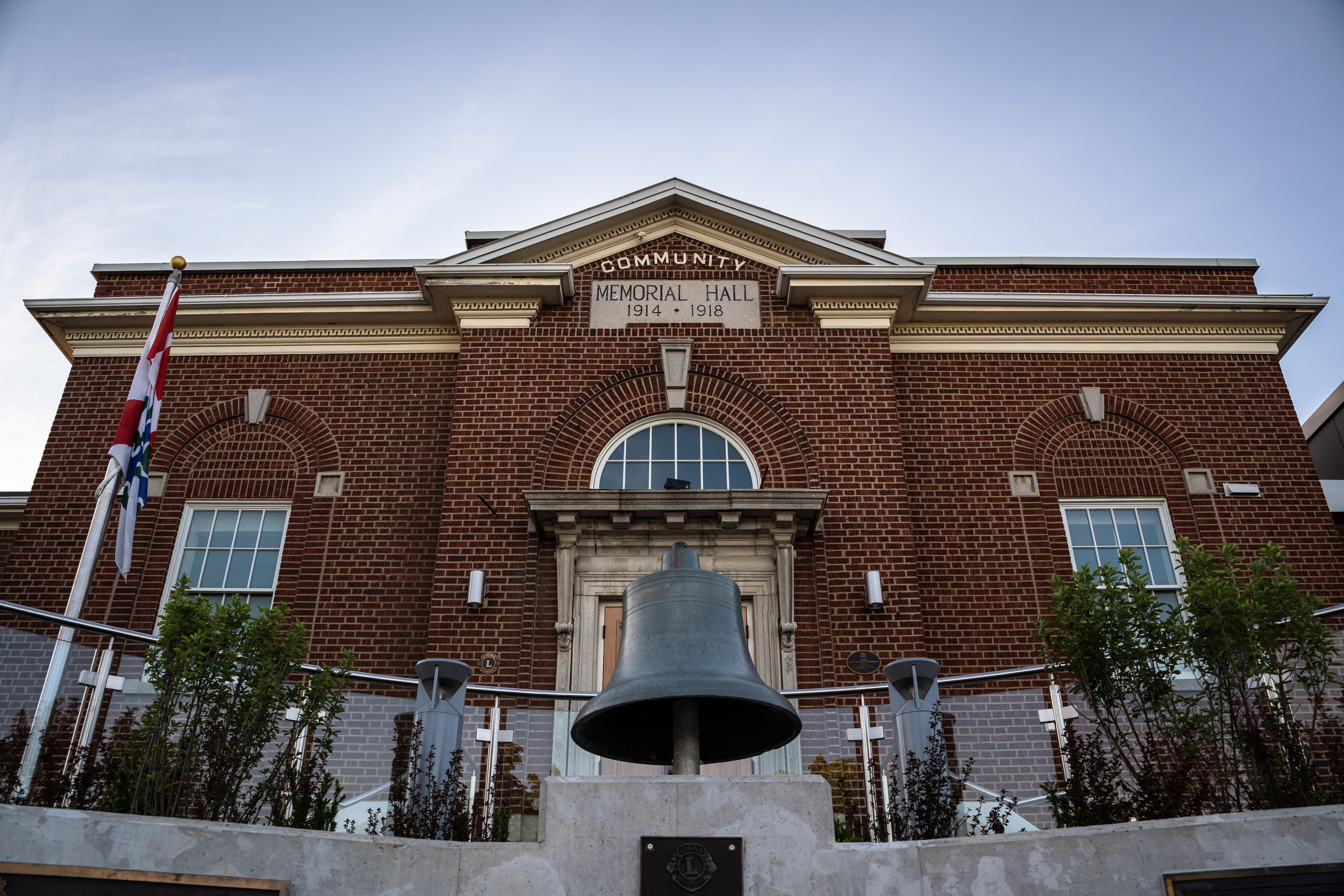
Historic Memorial Hall located in the downtown core of Waterdown

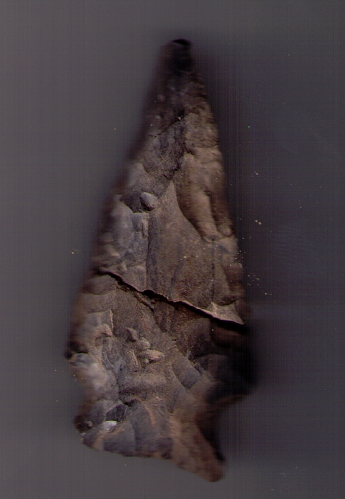
Discovered by resident Nicholas Schwetz in 2008 in the Waterdown South Development, this arrowhead reminded residents of the long history of First Nations' habitation in the region.

Perched atop the Niagara Escarpment, the area that became Waterdown has been inhabited for thousands of years. Professor John Triggs of Wilfrid Laurier University found evidence of Algonquin-speaking Aboriginals from as far back as 7,500 BCE. One of the earliest known groups to inhabit the area was the Chonnonton Nation. The Jesuits in Quebec City wrote that the Chonnonton Nation was driven from the area by 1653, with remnants of the once powerful group reportedly migrating to seek shelter with the Anishinabe nations on Lake Huron and Lake Superior.

Following the war, the area around Waterdown was sparsely inhabited by newly arrived Haudenosaunee. The Haudenosaunee village of Tinawatawa (alternatively spelled Quinaouatoua) was located near Waterdown, likely somewhere near Beverly Township. It was one of only a few villages established in the newly conquered territories. Following the upheaval of the so-called Beaver Wars, the Haudenosaunee abandoned their settlements north of Lake Ontario, and the Mississaugas moved into the region.

=== Robert de la Salle explores Flamborough ===
1669 saw French explorer Robert de la Salle follow Spencer Creek (from Lake Ontario) up toward present-day Westover and the Indigenous settlement of Tinawatawa. Here, la Salle met up with another French explorer, M. Louis Joilet. Some historians think this meeting happened along the shores of Lake Medad (northeast of present-day Waterdown, beside Hidden Lake Golf Club).

=== British Conquest of 1760 and the American Revolution ===
After the fall of New France, the region changed dramatically. The Anishinabe allied with the British Crown, which was reaffirmed by King George III's Royal Proclamation of 1763 and the Treaty of Niagara. For the Europeans, the region became part of the Province of Quebec, created by the British Crown.

The area remained largely unaffected until the American Revolution unleashed a flood of Loyalists fleeing the American republic. Access was primarily restricted to water, so the first settlements were along the coast of Lake Ontario. To facilitate the English-speaking settlers, the Province of Quebec was broken into Upper and Lower Canada with Lieutenant Governor John Graves Simcoe as the first representative of the Crown for Upper Canada. It was John Graves Simcoe who was walking along the beach strip of Hamilton that looked up at the escarpment and named its northern arm around Burlington Bay "Flamborough" because it reminded him of Flamborough Head in Yorkshire, England.

The Flamborough area came into Treaty with the Crown on May 22, 1784 (formally confirmed by Treaty No.3 in 1792). The frontline of the new township was laid out by John Collins in 1790, with further surveys conducted through 1797. It was intended to be the Township of Flamborough but was broken into the separate entities of East Flamborough and West Flamborough in 1798. Today, Waterdown is the largest settlement in the former township of East Flamborough.

=== Alexander Brown and Merren Grierson ===
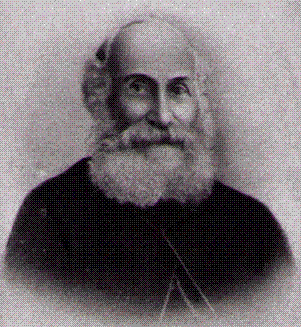
Alexander Brown built a log cabin at the top of Waterdown's Great Falls in 1805, becoming the first European resident of the area. This picture was taken in 1852, the year of Brown's death (he wears a military tunic, alluding to his rank of Colonel in the War of 1812).

One of the first land grants in the area was to Lt. Alexander MacDonell of Butler's Rangers. MacDonell never visited the area but sold 800 acres to Alexander Brown of the North West Fur Company in 1802. Brown built a log cabin and sawmill at the top of the Great Falls in present-day Smokey Hollow in 1805, making him the first European settler in the region. Alexander Brown married Merren Grierson and was a key figure in the community until he died in 1852. Alexander Brown II moved down Grindstone Creek to the site of present-day LaSalle Park, building a wharf (called "Brown's Wharf" or "Port Flamboro") to export the many things being created by the mills that quickly sprung up in the Waterdown area. It was Alexander Brown that built the first school of the village (on the site of the present-day American House) in 1815, employing Mary Hopkins as its first teacher.

=== Ebenezer Griffin – the founder of Waterdown ===
The arrival of entrepreneur Ebenezer Culver Griffin in 1823, purchasing over half of Alexander Brown's property, marked the beginning of the Village of Waterdown. It was Griffin who had his property surveyed into village lots in 1830. The post office dates from 1840.

=== Waterdown name ===
A local story credits Ebenezer Griffin with giving Waterdown its name. A prohibitionist, Griffin disapproved of the vast quantities of alcohol being consumed during the Victorian Age, including the whiskey used to christen new mills. During the christening of one of Griffin's mills, the carpenter called out for its name, and someone in the crowd called out, "Hey Ebenezer, throw that water down." The carpenter heard the name "Waterdown," and it was given to the mill and soon adopted by the emerging village.

A secondary story with a more plausible reality exists from the early pioneers of this area, naming Waterdown after Waterdown Forest in the UK. This area was a military encampment area that existed in 1782, extending from Tunbridge Wells in Kent in the north-west and Frant in Sussex. Many of the small towns and hamlets around Waterdown have been named after the exact named locations throughout the UK.

=== Industrial Revolution ===
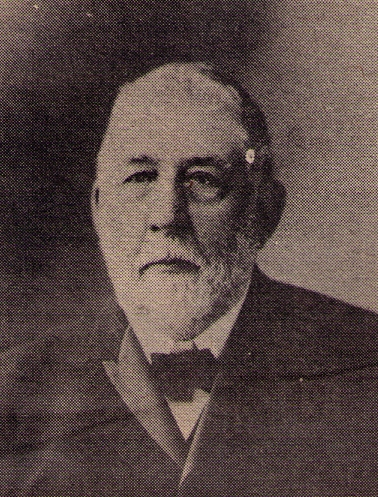
Charles Sealey, Waterdown's first reeve, 1879–1884

Waterdown was born out of the Industrial Revolution. Thanks to the plan drawn up by Ebenezer Griffin, settlers and industrialists rooted themselves in village life. Mills grew along the banks of Grindstone Creek (especially in the area known as Smokey Hollow – given this name because of all the smog caused by the many complexes) as individuals like William P. Howland arrived to make their fortune. In 1869, the population was 1,000. By 1879 the settlement was severed from the Township of East Flamborough and incorporated as a village in its own right with quarrier Charles Sealey as its first reeve. Waterdown remained its own municipality until it was absorbed into the Township of Flamborough in 1974.

=== Convent and academy ===
In 1927, the School Sisters of Notre Dame opened a Motherhouse in rural Waterdown and subsequently opened a private Catholic girls' school called Notre Dame Academy; classes started on 14 February 1927 with three teachers and 32 attendees. In addition to classrooms, the property included a residence for boarding students. The school was closed in 1993, but the convent continued to function and was renovated in 1997. Nuns continued to live there as the convent became a retirement home; as recently as summer 2019, 54 elderly nuns still reside there. The property was then put up for sale and plans were made move 300 bodies and gravestones from the cemetery to a nearby Catholic cemetery. Plans were also being made to relocate the residents of the convent.

=== 2001 amalgamation ===
Ontario's Progressive Conservative government embarked on a province-wide restructuring of municipal governments, amalgamating several municipalities into larger ones. It was proposed that Flamborough be amalgamated into the City of Hamilton with five other municipalities. Due to Waterdown's location as a "sandwich town," resting between Burlington and Hamilton, residents argued that Hamilton would not extend city services, such as bus routes, to Waterdown. Instead, they suggested that Flamborough be split into parts, with Waterdown amalgamating with Burlington. Burlington had expressed some interest in amalgamation. Burlington is closer geographically, and the Aldershot and Kerncliff Park neighbourhoods wrap around the south and east ends of the community. Burlington had also expressed a willingness to expand bus service to Waterdown.

In 2001, Waterdown was amalgamated into Hamilton with the rest of Flamborough. This prompted the elected Member of Provincial Parliament at the time, Conservative Toni Skarica, to resign. Skarica ran partially due to a platform of keeping Flamborough unamalgamated and vowed to resign if the government amalgamated it with Hamilton.

=== Souharissen Natural Area ===
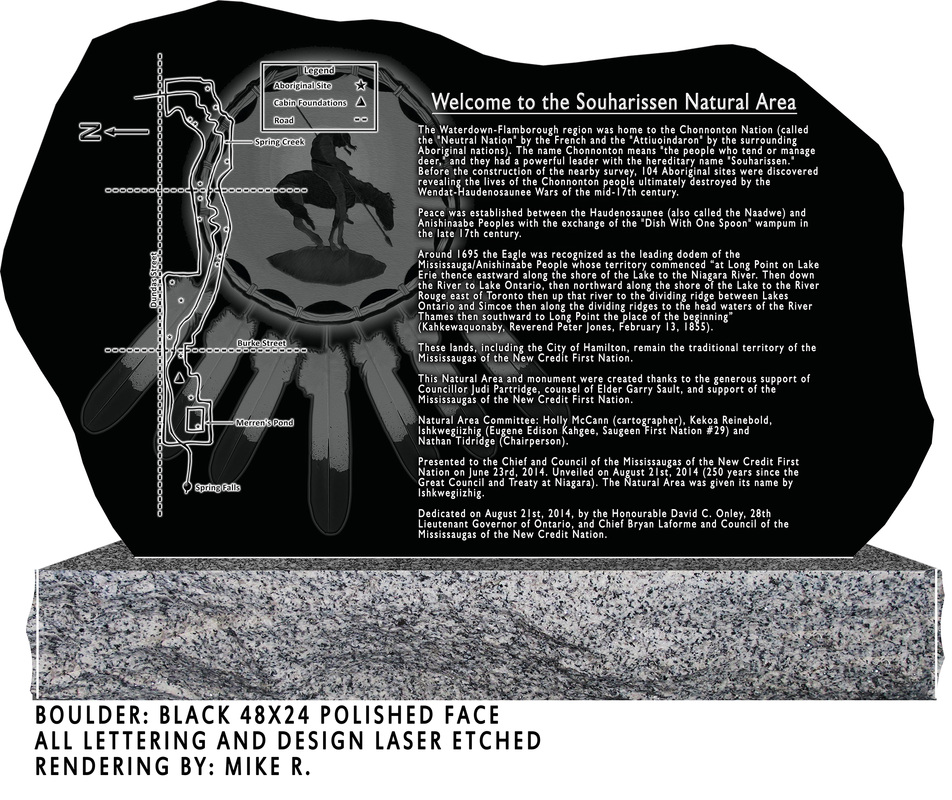
The Souharissen Monument stone located in the Souharissen Natural Area, Waterdown (near the corner of Dundas & Burke Street).

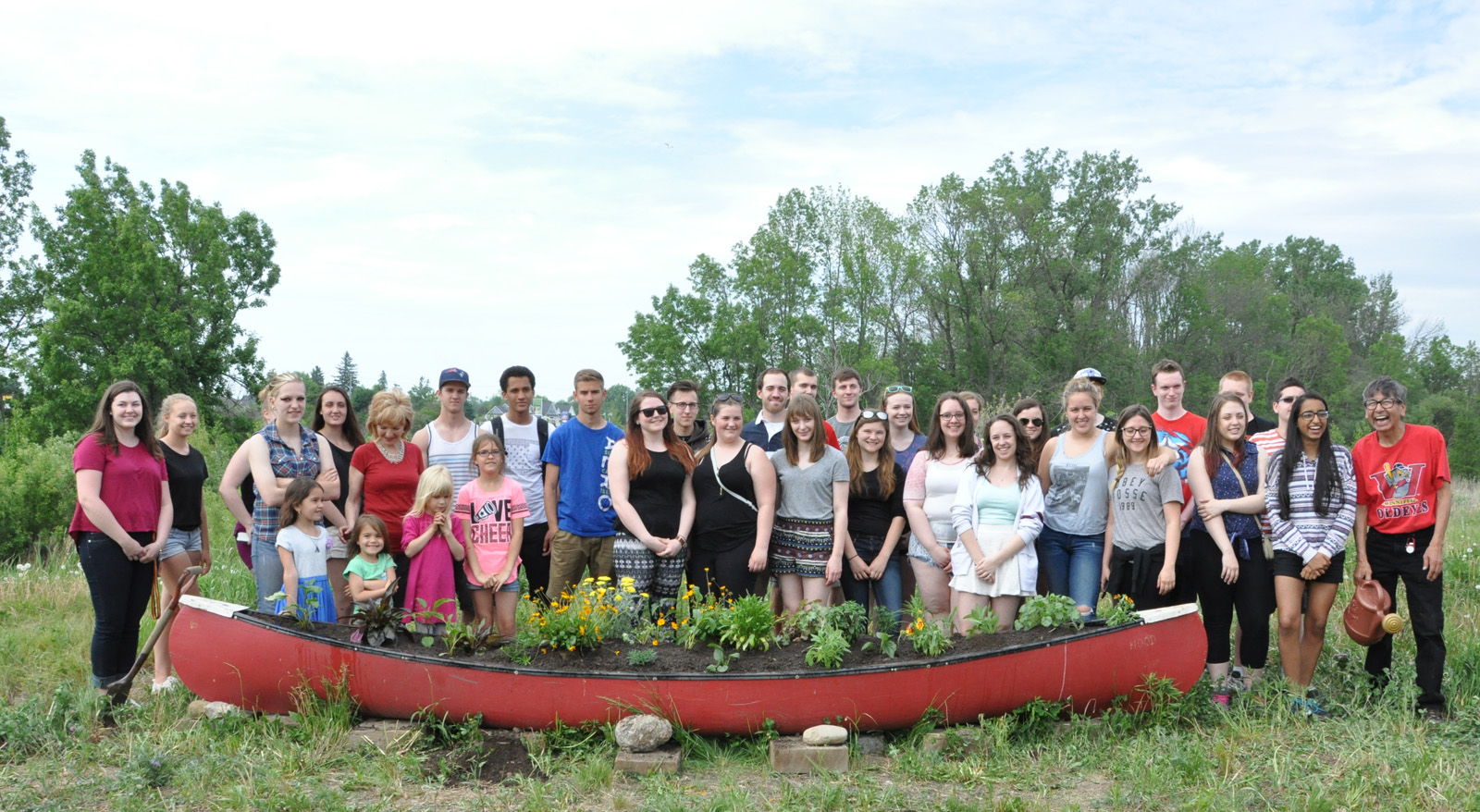
Students from Waterdown District High School, and members of the community, plant the Souharissen Canoe Garden in 2015. The garden is filled with soil and medicine gifted by the Mississaugas of the New Credit Nation.

On August 21, 2014, the Souharissen Natural Area was dedicated in Waterdown by the Honourable David C. Onley, 28th Lieutenant Governor of Ontario, and Chief Bryan Laforme and Council of the Mississaugas of the New Credit First Nation. Over 50 people attended the dedication, including David Sweet MP, Councillor Judi Partridge, Carolyn King, United Empire Loyalists, and other members of the Mississaugas of the New Credit. The day began with lighting the first sacred fire in over two centuries, signalling the formal return of the Mississaugas to their traditional territory.

The Souharissen Natural Area covers 27 acres in the Village of Waterdown. It is the result of years of work following the discovery of 104 Indigenous archeological sites in the Waterdown Bay Development Area in 2005.

Along with the Indigenous sites, the foundations of an early 19th-century dwelling were uncovered in the area. This dwelling may have been used by the first European settlers of Waterdown, Alexander Brown and Merren Grierson. The Natural Area includes a plaque identifying this important landmark, as well as detailing the histories of Merren Grierson and Alexander Brown, which was unveiled by the Lieutenant Governor, Chief LaForme, and researcher Kekoa Reinebold.

Later that day, a community feast was held in Waterdown at a local residence in honour of the return of the Mississaugas of the New Credit First Nation to Flamborough, as well as the visit by the Lieutenant Governor of Ontario and Chief of the Mississaugas of the New Credit. Everyone who was part of the dedication, including the Lieutenant Governor and Chief Laforme, attended.

=== The Queen's Bench ===
Flamborough has a tradition of honouring royal milestones, including the "Queen's Trees" in Harpers Corners, located outside the library and at Memorial Park. On September 9, 2015, the Honourable Elizabeth Dowdeswell, 29th Lieutenant Governor of Ontario, visited Waterdown to unveil the Queen's Bench in Memorial Park. The bench commemorates that on that day, the reign of Queen Elizabeth II surpassed that of Queen Victoria, making it the longest reign in Canada's modern era. The bench is engraved with many of the Canadian milestones of Her Majesty Queen Elizabeth II, Queen of Canada. The project was completed thanks to generous donations made by community members.

== Natural attractions ==
Waterdown, and its associated Great Falls, (also called Grindstone Falls, so named for the Grindstone Creek that feeds it, or Smokey Hollow Falls, so named for the smoke rising from the hollow from the mills, or Barnes' Falls, named after the Barnes family who owned the property until 1978), are located on the local portion of the Bruce Trail System in Ontario. Many national and regionally rare flora species grow in the natural areas of Waterdown.

The Smokey Hollow Falls powered a sawmill and gristmill when the town was founded, and later several other small mills, and as a result of demand on the limited water supply, time shared the water. The last operating sawmill (Slater's Lumber Mill) continued to produce lumber well into the 1970s. It was located along Grindstone Creek behind the Knox Presbyterian Church at the corner of Mill Street North and Church Street. During the 1950s and mid-1960s, the mill used horses and heavy tackle to haul the logs to the cutting area. Today, only remote foundation ruins of the mills remain, although a lookout over the falls and a signboard detailing the area's history is in place.

Furthermore, Waterdown has many wetland trails at the eastern end of town, which are well-marked and have informational signage.

== Other attractions ==
Waterdown is also home to a hockey arena, Harry Howell Arena, which is home of the Flamborough Hockey Association, the Flamborough Girls Hockey Association, and the Flamboro Skating Club.

Each July 1 weekend, Waterdown hosts the Oh Canada! Ribfest, a joint community-focused event sponsored by the Rotary Clubs of Flamborough AM and Waterdown. Tens of thousands of people from Waterdown and surrounding communities fill Memorial Park enjoying local music artists, dancers, midway rides, kids' activities, and food.

== Notable people ==
- Leo Clarke, recipient of the Victoria Cross for actions during the Battle of Flers-Courcelette in the First World War
- Dylan Everett, (1995–) Gemini-nominated actor known for his roles in Canadian teen comedies and dramas
- Todd Harvey, (1975–), retired NHL hockey player and was captain of the Canadian team at the World Junior Hockey Championships.
- Terra Lightfoot, country and roots rock performer
- Jeff Malott, (1996–) NHL player, Los Angeles Kings, born in Burlington, raised in Waterdown.
- Douglas McGregor, WW1 flying ace
- Erin Pitt, (1999–) actress, best known for her role as Isabelle in An American Girl: Isabelle Dances into the Spotlight
- Josh Ross, country music singer and songwriter
- Carter Verhaeghe, (1995–) NHL player, Florida Panthers, born and raised in Waterdown
- Mark Visentin, (1992–) NHL player, Phoenix Coyotes
- John Williams, Jr., (1977–), Canadian Football League (CFL) player
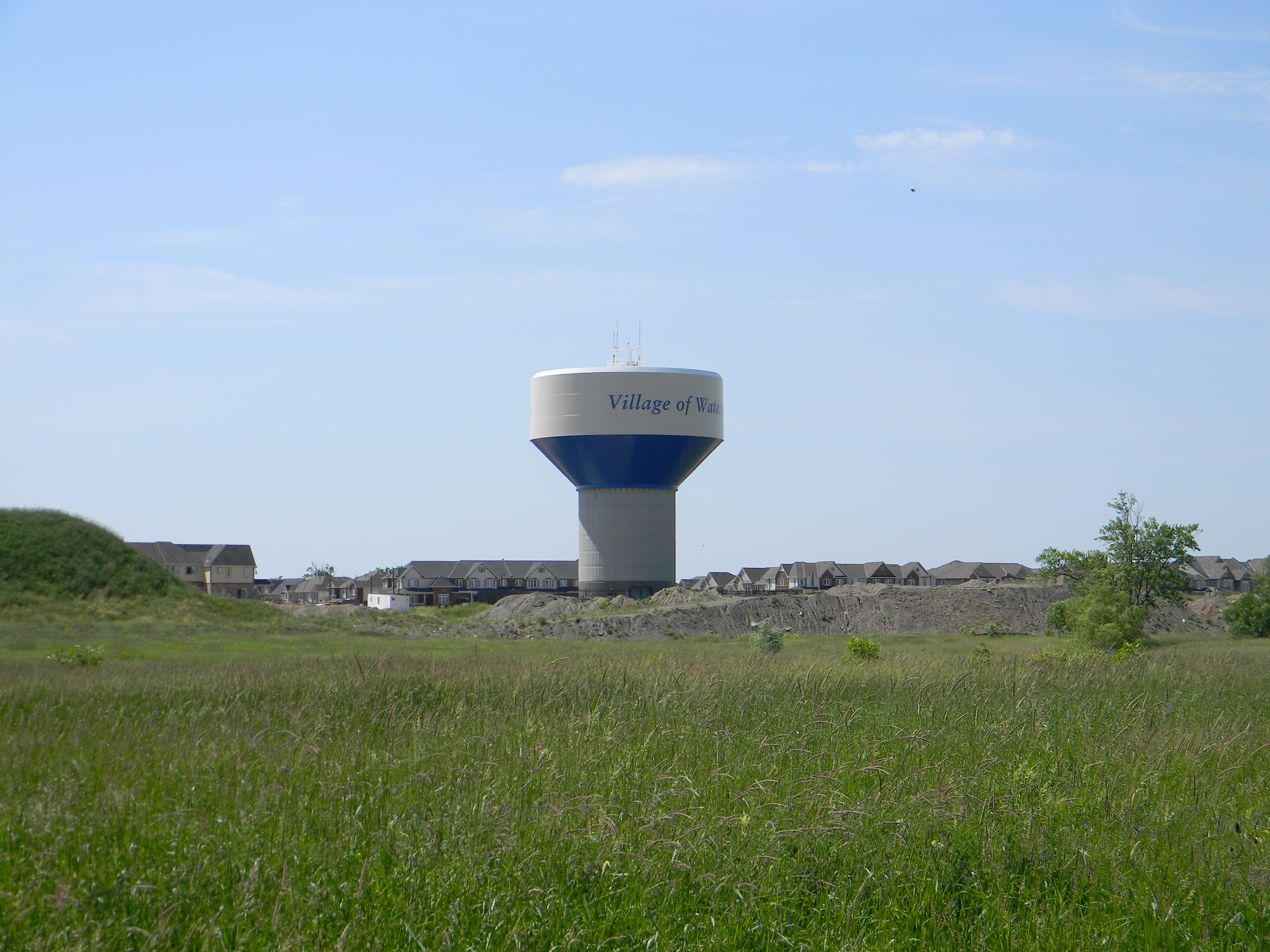
Watertower

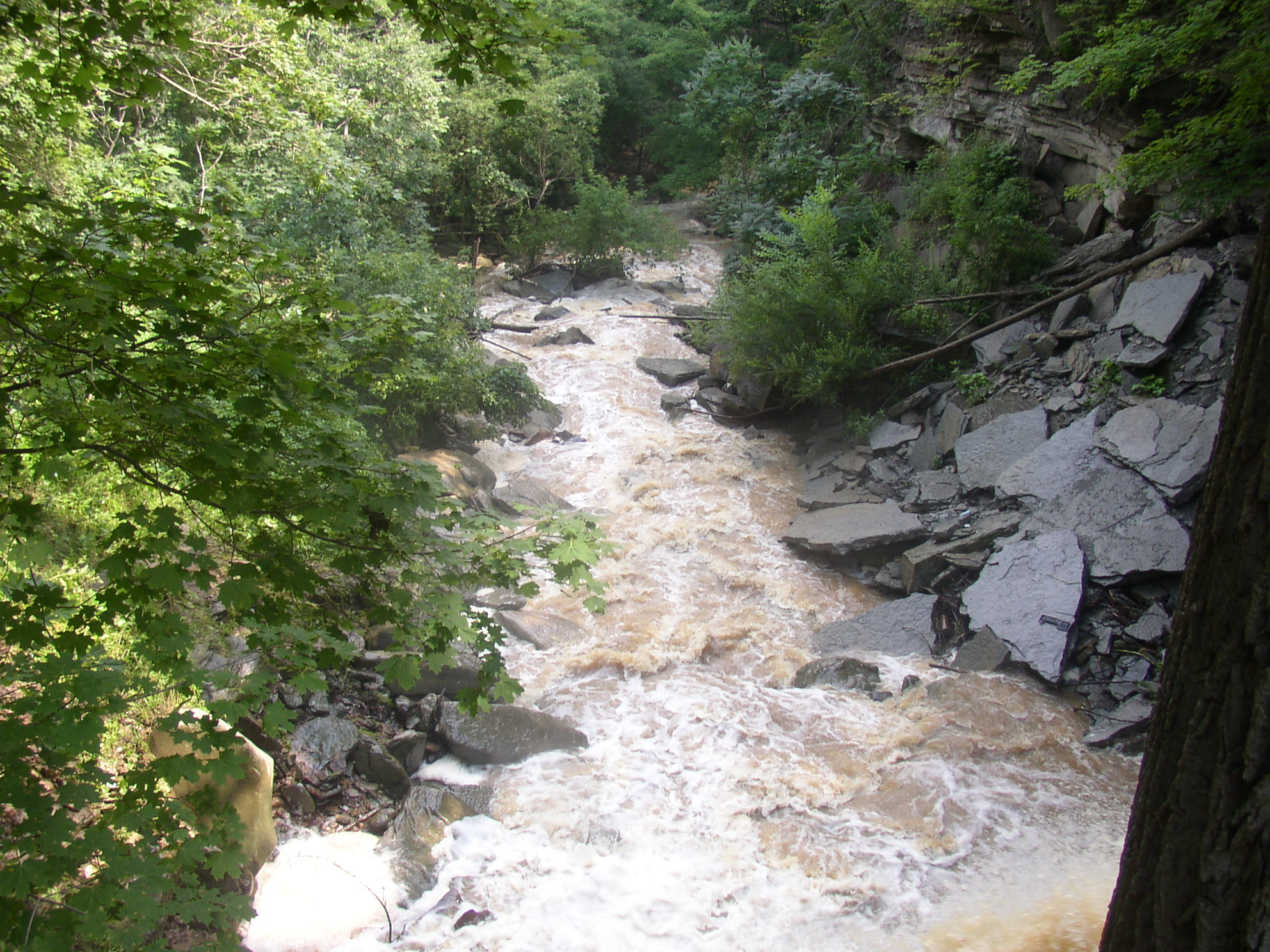
Waterdown, Great Falls

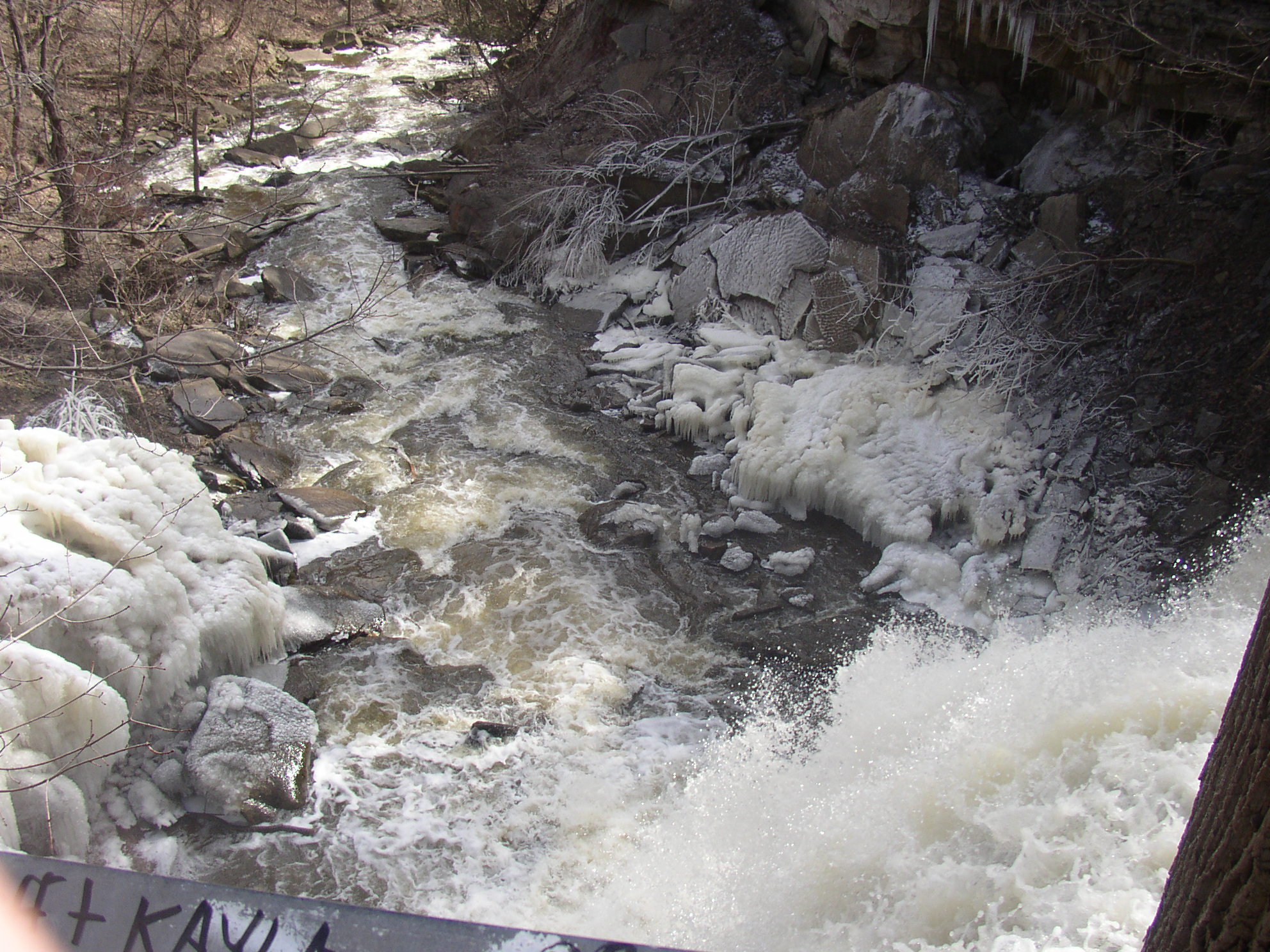
Waterdown, Great Falls

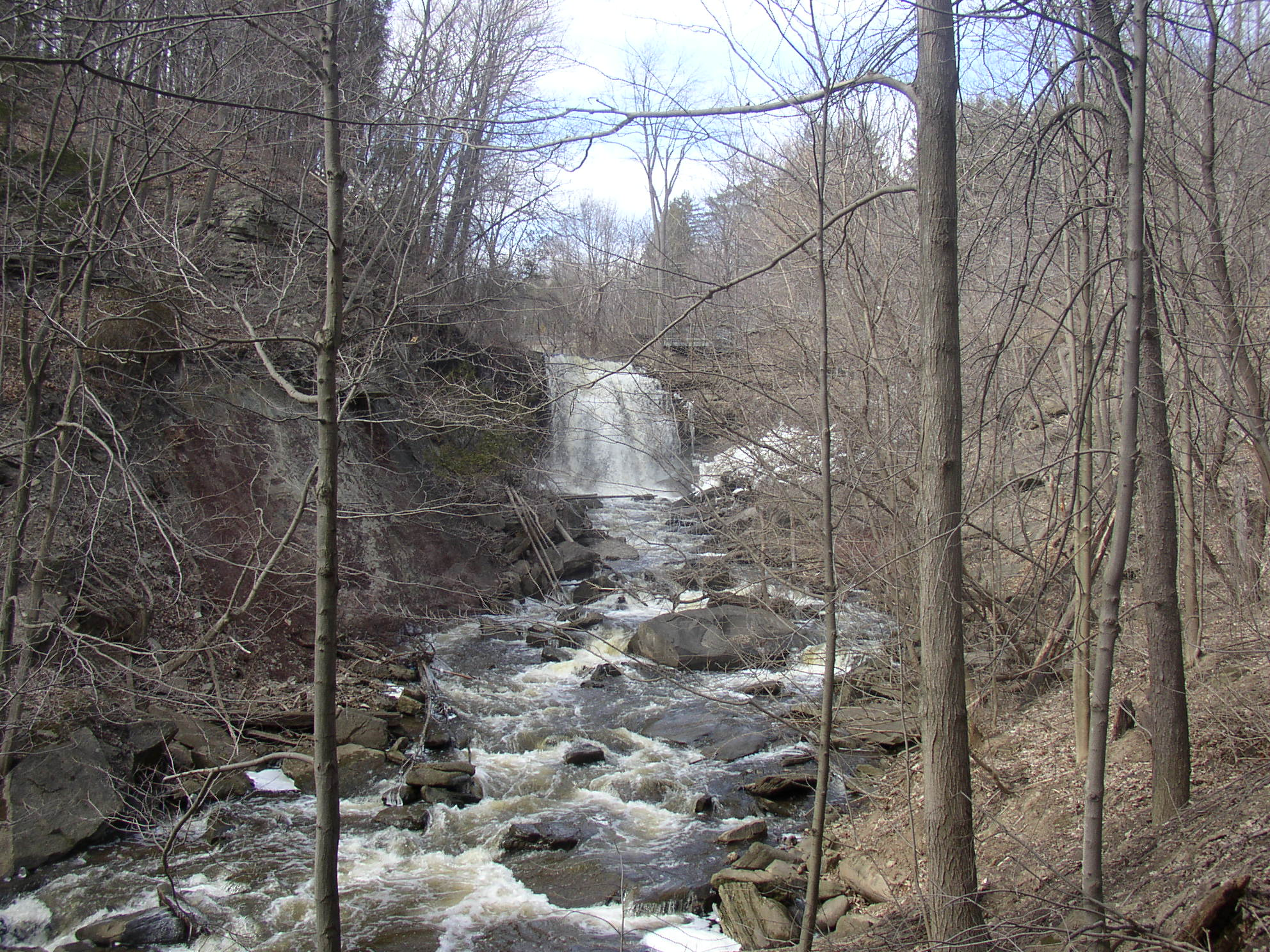
Waterdown, Great Falls
