= Burlington Street =

Road in Hamilton, Ontario, Canada

- Maintained by: the City of Hamilton
- Length: 8.5 km (5.3 mi)
- Location: Hamilton
- West end: Bay Street
- Major junctions: Wellington Street
- East end: East of Parkdale Avenue

Nikola Tesla Boulevard

Route information
- Maintained by the City of Hamilton

Major junctions
- West end: Burlington Street/Industrial Drive 165 metres (541 ft) east of Ottawa Street
- East end: Queen Elizabeth Way

Location
- Country: Canada
- Province: Ontario
- Major cities: Hamilton

Highway system
- Ontario municipal expressways
(in alphabetical order)
← Lincoln M. Alexander Parkway	Nikola Tesla Boulevard	Ottawa Road 174 →

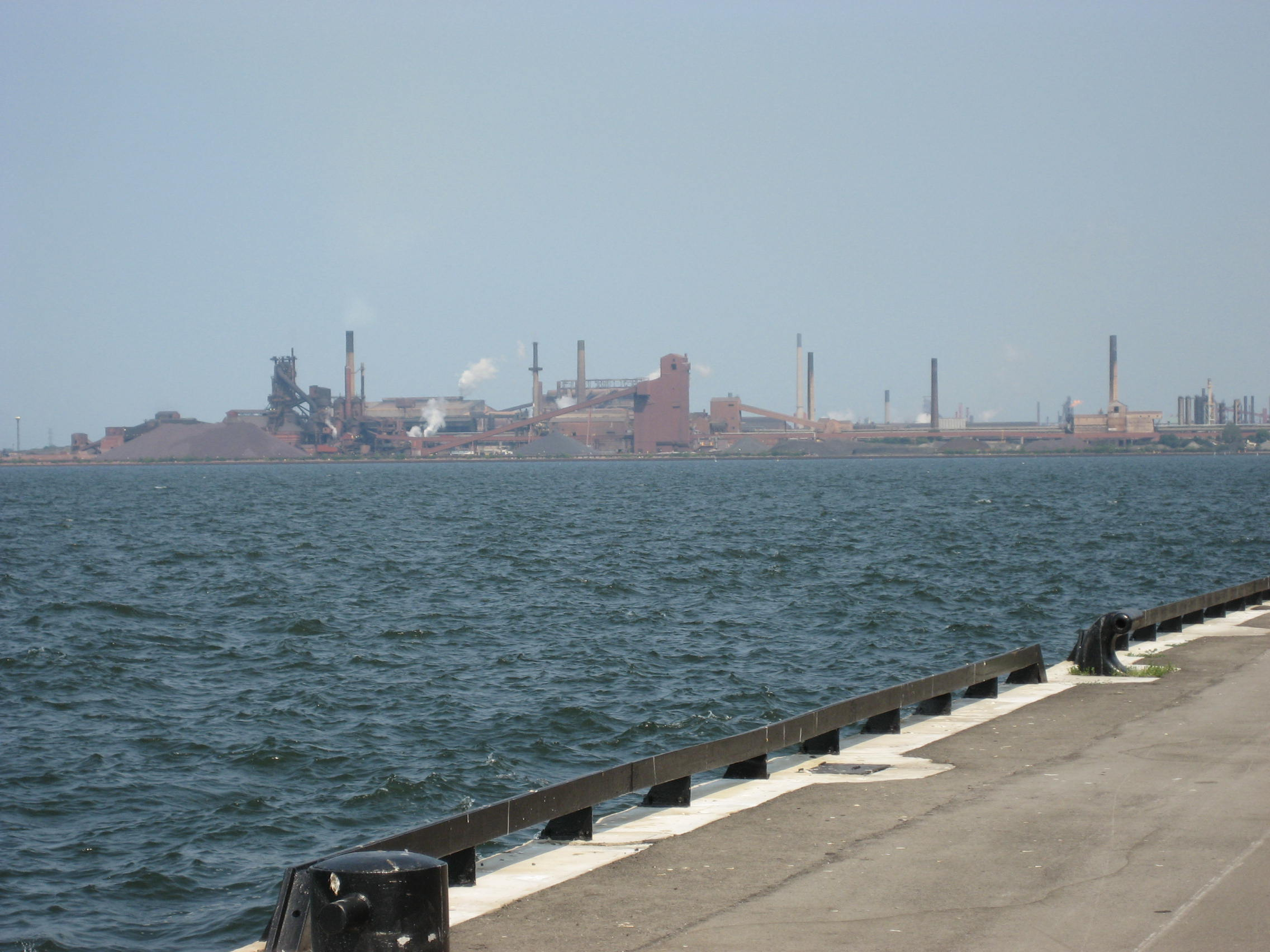
Pier 9, Waterfront Trail, Stelco in background

Burlington Street is a partially at grade and elevated roadway in Hamilton, Ontario, stretching along the south shore of Hamilton Harbour in Lake Ontario. Burlington Street has four different statuses along the route. In its western terminus, it is a collector route ending at Bay Street North. Upon the intersection at Wellington Street, the road becomes an arterial route with four lanes. The Street ends at Parkdale Avenue. On October 14, 2015, city council approved the renaming of the upper portion of Burlington Street from 165 metres east of Ottawa St to the QEW to Nikola Tesla Boulevard.

Nikola Tesla Boulevard is the official exit No. 90 from QEW. The signage along the QEW for Burlington Street was eventually replaced between October 22–23, 2016, to reflect the name change. After this change, the westbound lanes of Burlington street begin from the first exit on Nikola Tesla Boulevard, heading westbound.

== History ==
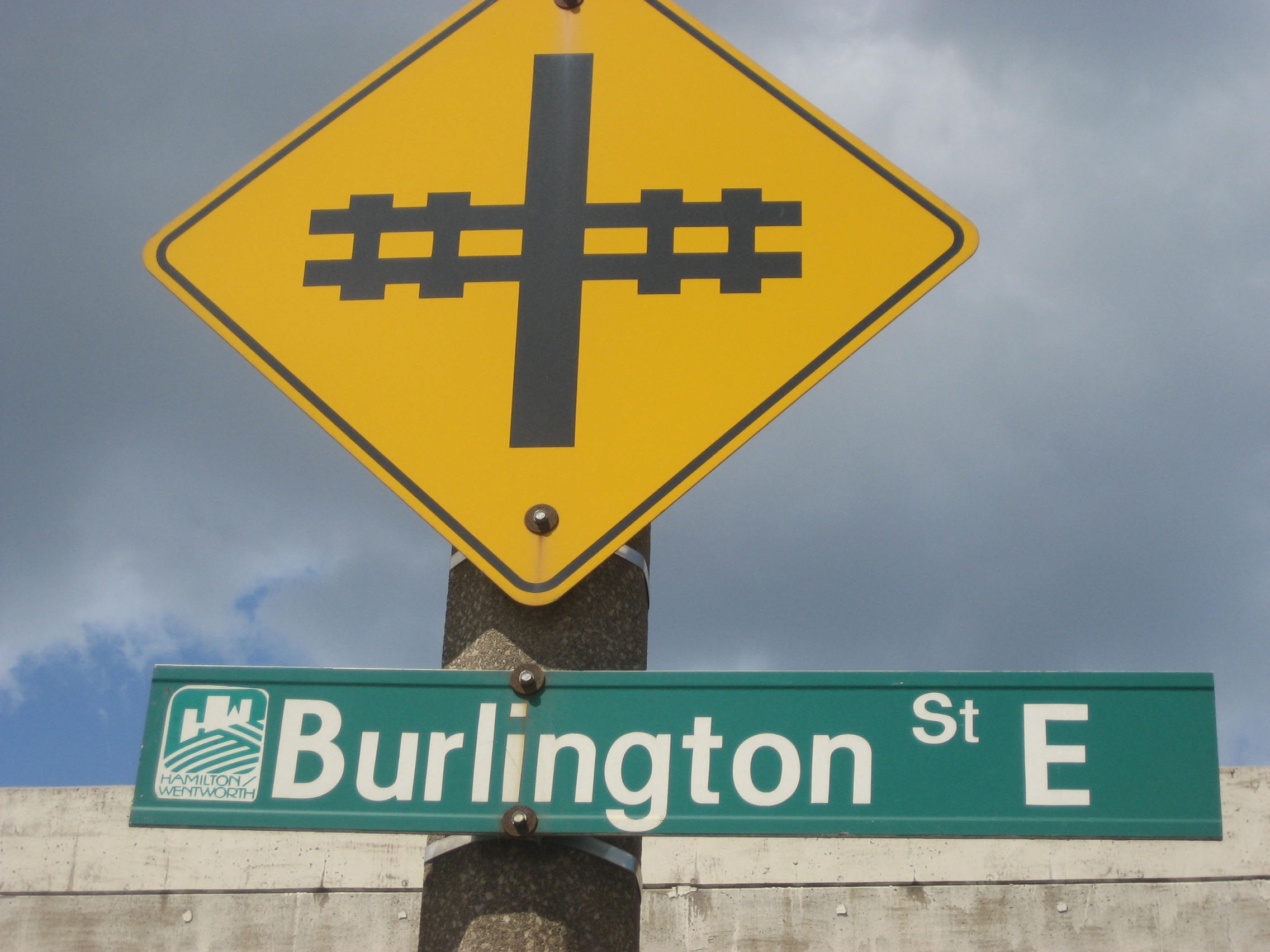

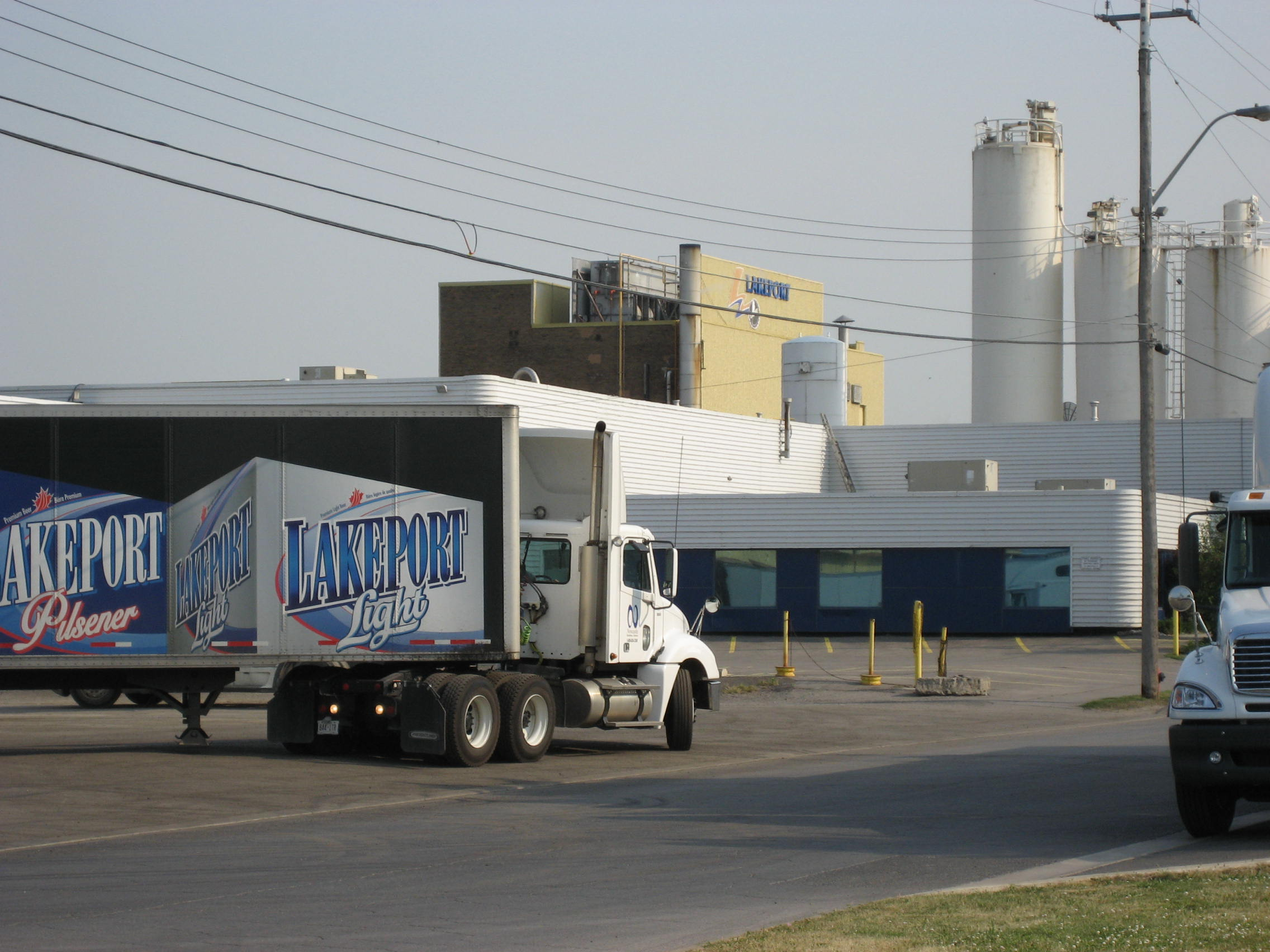
Lakeport Brewing Company

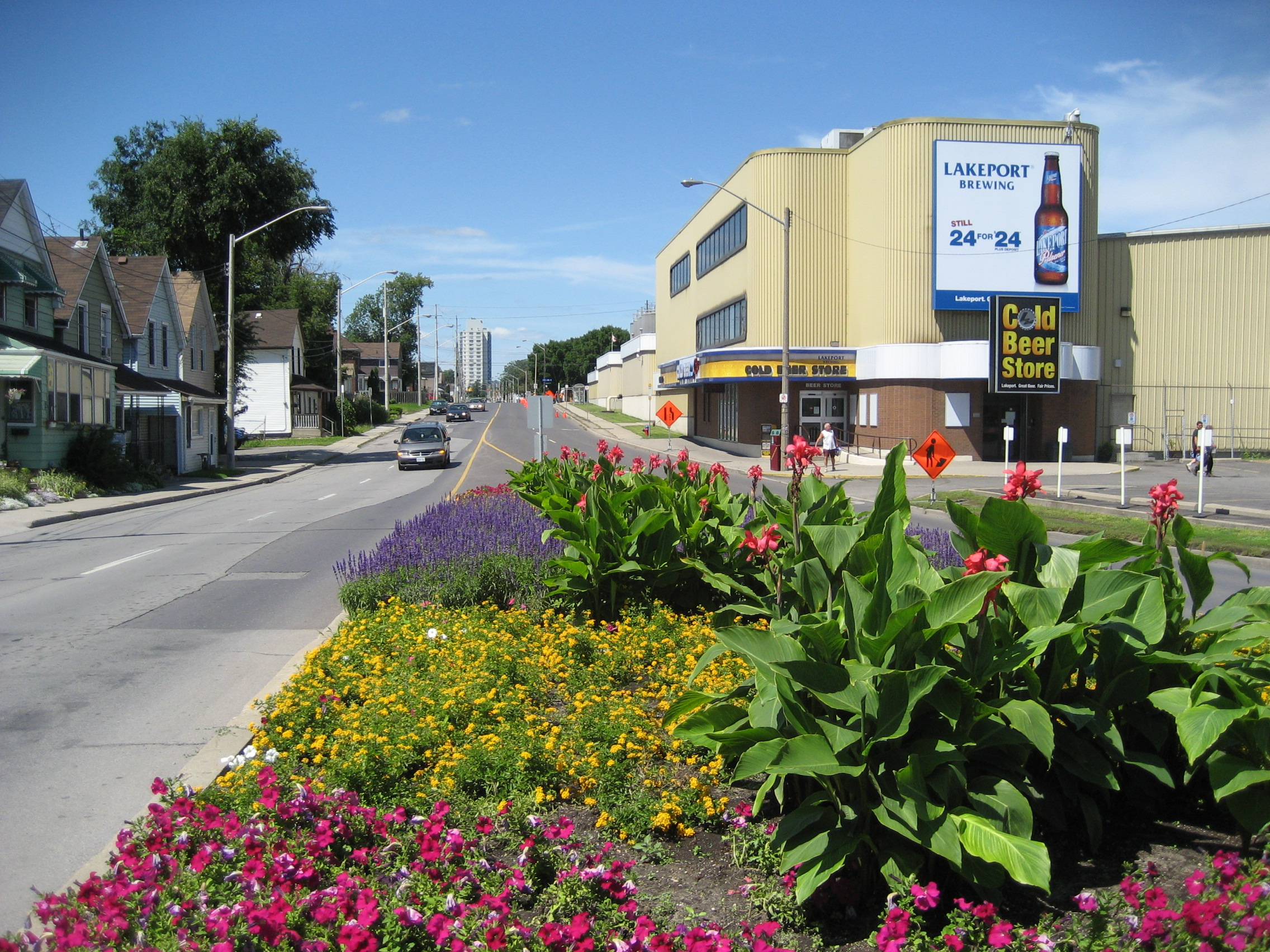
Lakeport Brewery

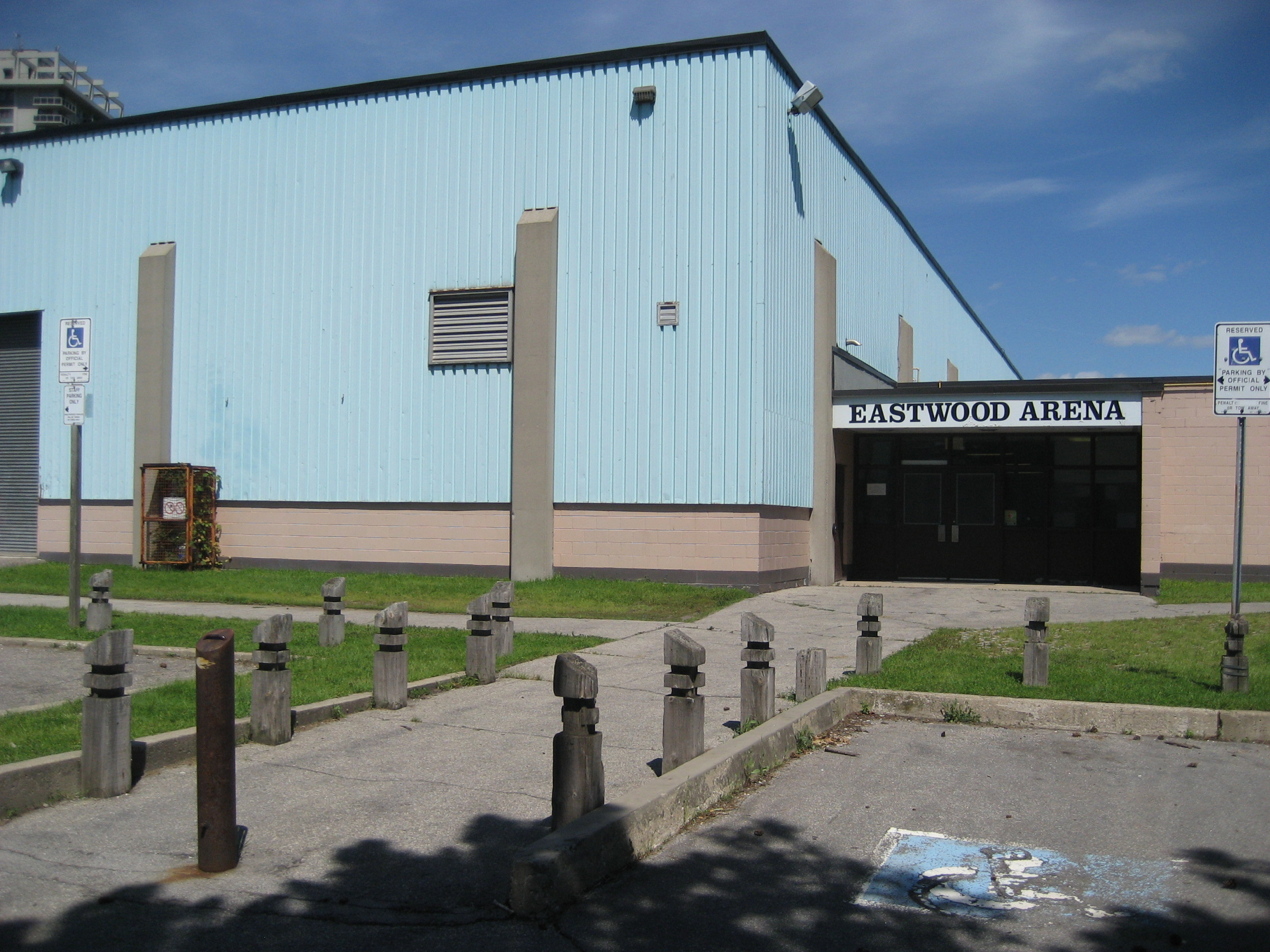
Eastwood Arena

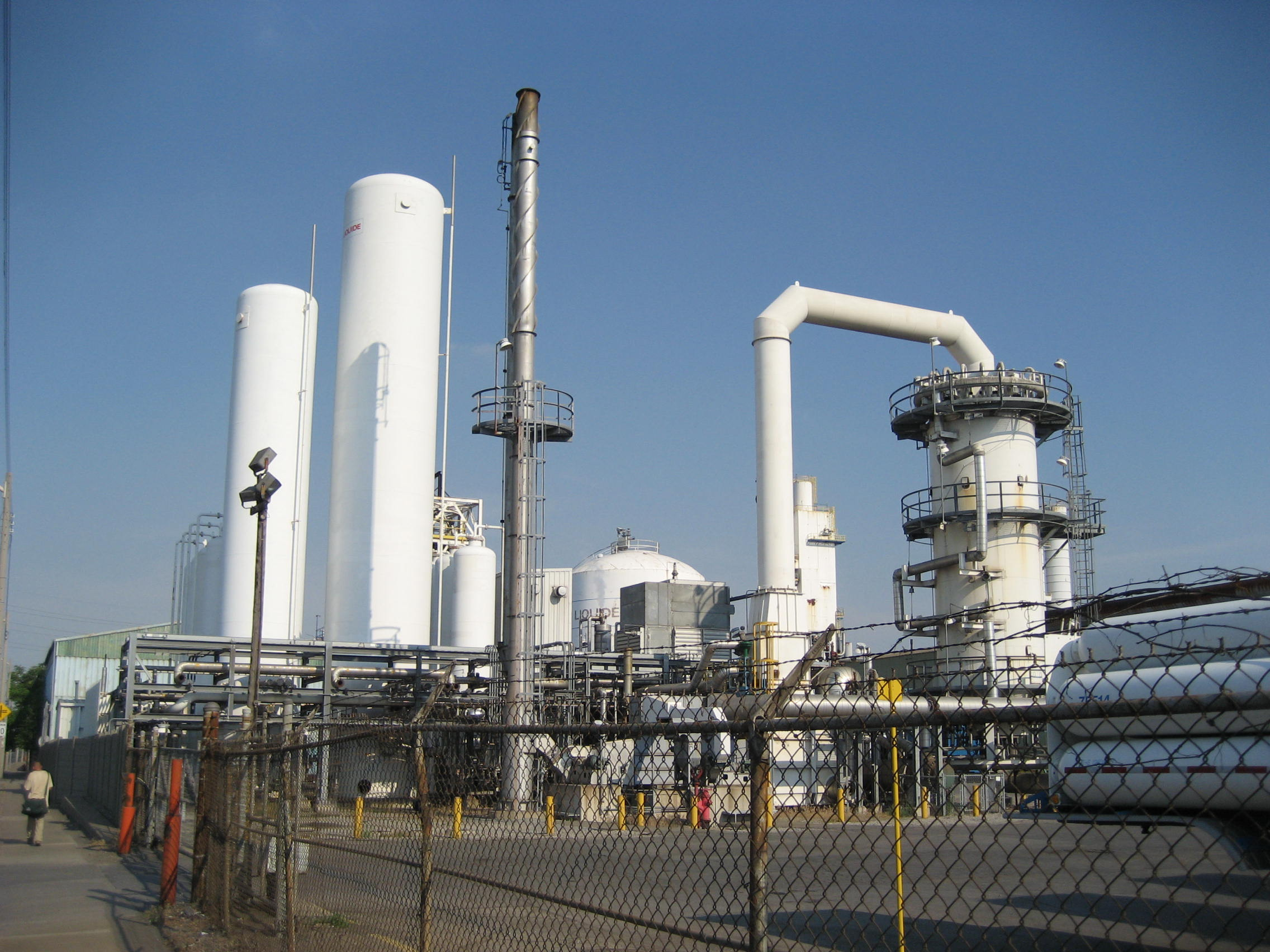
Liquid Air Ltd.

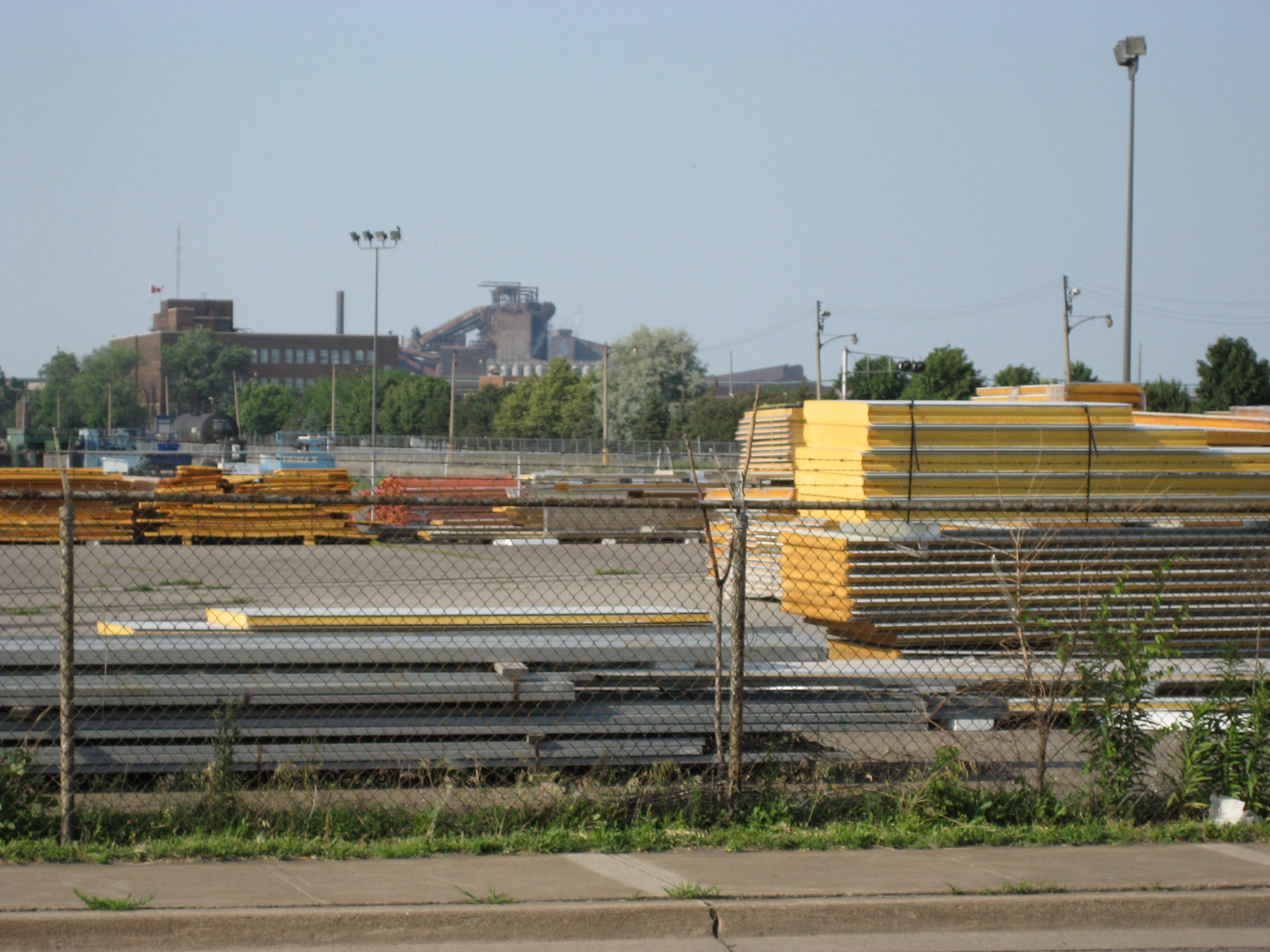
North End Industrial, walking tour

Burlington Street's original name was "Industrial Road". It derives its name from its proximity to Hamilton Harbour, which used to be called Burlington Bay. (Note: Still referred to as "Burlington Bay" in Burlington, Ontario) After World War II, when Hamilton was at its industrial peak, Burlington Street was the address of some of the city's most prestigious manufacturing companies. In the 1950s, the Canadian head offices of Stelco, Dofasco, Firestone, International Harvester, Procter & Gamble and Westinghouse were situated on or close to Burlington Street.

On August 25, 1898, the City of Hamilton received Power from the Decew Falls Power Generating Station. This station was built using Nikola Tesla's invention of the Alternating Current system of generators, transformers and motors. The arrival of Power to Hamilton usher in a new age of innovation and industrial growth. The city became known as the "Electric City". On Victoria Avenue, just south of Burlington Street, stand the first building to receive power in 1898. The building even has part of the name of the Cataract Power still on it. On the corner of Burlington Street and Strathearne Ave, is the major Electrical transformer station that receives power from 3 sources, Niagara Falls, Decew Falls and the Pickering Nuclear Station. The power that arrives from Decew Falls travels down the original power line built in 1898 by the Cataract Power, Light and Traction owned by the "5 Johns". At the entrance of Nikola Tesla Boulevard, there are high voltage transmission towers on either side of the road, each one stands as a monument to Nikola Tesla as they bring Electricity, to power the city.

In 1902, Canadian Otis Elevator Company (1902–1987) is formed (August 22) on Victoria Avenue North. For many years Hamilton was home to the largest single elevator manufacturing facility in the world. The workers produced all kinds of elevators, escalators and later, forklifts. In 1969, the company took over the old Studebaker plant. It was a return home for Otis, which had built the 350,000-square-foot (33,000 m^{2}) facility for wartime production of anti-aircraft guns and other military equipment.

International Harvester became the second major United States industry to locate in Hamilton, Ontario (1902). Originally known as Deering Harvester, the company plant sprawled along the Hamilton waterfront and claimed to be the "largest agricultural implement works in the British Empire." The plant was also involved in wartime production of specialized military items. The company started building heavy duty diesel trucks in Hamilton in 1959. The first to roll off the line was delivered to Dofasco, complete with a Rolls-Royce engine. Hamilton won over a number of Canadian cities when it successfully lured International Harvester. The reasons the company cited for its selection of Hamilton were as follows: it had waterside property that enabled the firm to control its own docks, its proximity to the steel industry, railway connections and the Cataract Power Company supplied them with cheap energy.

In 1913, Procter & Gamble Manufacturing Company (based in Cincinnati) purchased 7 acres (28,000 m^{2}) of land and 2 acres (8,100 m^{2}) of water on the south side of Burlington Street between Depew and Ottawa Streets. This event marked the beginning of Procter & Gamble's operations outside of the United States. In 1914, Construction started on the Procter & Gamble Hamilton plant, which cost $1 million and consisted of seven buildings: the Crisco building, the boiler house, the gas plant, the soap building, the hardening plant, the kettle and glycerin house, and the machine shop. By 1915, Procter & Gamble officially opens Hamilton plant, employing 75 workers who made six different products.

On August 18, 1948, surrounded by more than 400 employees and a battery of reporters, the first vehicle, a blue Champion four-door sedan, rolls off the Studebaker assembly line. The company was located in the former Otis-Fenson military weapons factory off Burlington Street East, which was built in 1941. The Indiana-based Studebaker was looking for a Canadian site and settled on Hamilton because of its steel industry. The company was known for making automotive innovations and building solid distinctive cars. 1950 was its best year but the descent was quick. By 1954, Studebaker was in the red and merging with Packard, another falling car manufacturer. In 1963, the company moved its entire car operations to Hamilton. The Canadian car side had always been a money-maker and Studebaker was looking to curtail disastrous losses. That took the plant from a single to double shift – 48 to 96 cars daily. The last car to roll off the line was a turquoise Lark cruiser on March 4, 1966. Studebaker officially shuts down the next day on March 5, 1966 as its last car factory. It was terrible news for the 700 workers who had formed a true family at the company, known for its employee parties and day trips. It was a huge blow to the city, too. Studebaker was Hamilton's 10th largest employer at the time.

== Today ==
The Hamilton-Oshawa Port Authority, formerly known as Hamilton Harbour Commission, handles over 12 million metric tonnes of cargo through over 700 vessels each year. This ranks Hamilton as the busiest of all the ports of Canada's great lakes and 28% of all movements on the St. Lawrence Seaway System. In 2006 Total ships in and out of the harbour was 739; Domestic/U.S.: 577 (78%), International: 162 (22%) from countries including Malaysia, Philippines, Russia and Brazil. Percentage of Imports: 87%, Percentage of Exports: 13%. International arrivals at the port grew from 130 ships in 2005 to 162 ships in 2006. In 2006 most of the materials arriving at the port include raw materials including iron ore and coal for steelmaking at Stelco and Dofasco, as well as imported steel from Brazil. The port also accepted 24,000 litres (5,280 Imp gallons) of bulk Jamaican rum. The oddest new arrival was windmill blades (some more than 80 feet (24 m) long) destined for wind farms in southern Ontario. This is the first year windmill parts have arrived in the port. Exports include 500,000 metric tonnes (550,000 short tons) of agricultural products including grain.

Lakeport Brewing Company is based in Hamilton and focused on producing value-priced quality beer for the Ontario take-home market. Lakeport produces nine proprietary beer brands, two of which, Lakeport Honey Lager and Lakeport Pilsener, are two of the top ten selling brands in the province of Ontario. Lakeport has more than 200 employees at its production facility. It is one of the fastest-growing companies in the Hamilton region. Lakeport Brewing Company joined forces with the Hamilton Port Authority who will finance and construct a 35,000 square foot (3,250 m²) expansion to Lakeport's Hamilton harbour front facility. Lakeport Brewing Company is Canada's No.1 co-packer of beer, non-alcohol and spirit-based products. The company is also said to be North America's most modernized beverage alcohol production facility. On Monday May 8, Labatt Brewing Company made it official and announced that Lakeport, who they purchased earlier in the year, (March 29, 2007), for $200-million for rights to the income trust, which controlled the plant, will continue to operate in the City of Hamilton. It will continue to operate in Hamilton as they believe it is a "viable plant" and "the company is proud to integrate it with Labbat's." The operations employees continue to brew Lakeport in Hamilton but the marketing and sales jobs are now centralized at Labatt's head offices.

Bunge is an oilseed processing plant and Canada's largest canola processor. It has crushing facilities in Altona and Harrowby, Manitoba; Fort Saskatchewan, Alberta; and Nipawin, Saskatchewan in addition to the processing plant in Hamilton. The Hamilton plant serves food manufacturers, the biodiesel industry and farmers in Ontario and Quebec.

As the largest steel manufacturing city in Canada and home of the two Steel giants; Stelco and Dofasco where 60% of all the steel in Canada is produced. It is the steel and metals manufacturing Capital of Canada. In the last decade, Hamilton's heavy industry reached a stable level, Stelco has returned to profitability and on August 26, 2007, United States Steel Corporation acquired Stelco for $38.50 (Canadian) in cash per share, owning more than 76 percent of Stelco's outstanding shares. Dofasco in 1999 was the most profitable steel producer in North America and in 2000 it was the most profitable in Canada. It currently has approximately 7,300 employees at its Hamilton plant and produces over four million tons of steel annually, representing about 30% of Canada's flat rolled sheet steel shipments. Dofasco was purchased by Arcelor Mittal in January 2006, and in addition to being one of North America's most profitable steel companies, Dofasco has been named to the Dow Jones Sustainability World Index seven years in a row. Dofasco's wide range of steel products is sold to customers in the automotive, construction, energy, manufacturing, pipe and tube, appliance, packaging and steel distribution industries.

National Steel Car, North America's leader in freight and passenger train cars and equipment is based in Hamilton. They have been building rail transportation products since 1912. National Steel Car won a contract in January 2007 for 1,200 custom-made railcars for TransLoad America, a New Jersey–based waste transport firm.

Columbian Chemicals Ltd. on 755 Parkdale Avenue North, are manufacturers of carbon black - an agent used to reinforce and extend the life of products made with rubber, giving it durability and strength. This includes tires and hoses and plastics such as wire and cable coverings. Carbon black is also used in inks and coatings like copier and computer printer cartridges and paints. The Hamilton plant was built in 1961 and in 2007 employed 100 people.

== Landmarks ==
Note: Listing of Landmarks from West to East.

- Hamilton Waterfront Trail
- Bayfront Park/ Pier 4 Park
- Hamilton Harbour Commissioners Building
- Eastwood Park/ Eastwood Arena
- Hamilton Port Authority, Administration Office
- Lakeport Brewing Company
- BUNGE Processing plant (Canada's largest canola processor)
- Liquid Air Ltd.
- Otis Elevator Buildings (2), site of Otis Elevator Company, (1902–1987) and Studebaker of Canada, (1948–1966) Currently used as a warehouse by Stelco and various other North End industries.
- Stelco (steel company)
- Dofasco (steel company)
- National Steel Car (builders of railway cars)
- Canada Pipe Company Ltd.
- Proscor (scrap & waste management)
- Columbian Chemicals Canada Ltd.
- Parkdale Warehouse & Distribution
- Lakeshore Sand Company
- Orlick Industries Ltd. (headquarters)
- Museum of Steam & Technology

== Communities ==
Note: List of neighbourhoods from North to South.

- North End - Everything north of the Canadian National Railway tracks
- Parkview West

== Former Unique Road Status ==
Two way two lane collector route from Bay Street to Wellington Street; a four lane arterial route from Wellington Street to McKinstry Street. A two lane one-way arterial street from Sherman Avenue to Ottawa Street. Prior to the renaming of the upper level of the road, From just west of Ottawa Street on to the QEW, the upper level of the road has been renamed to Nikola Tesla Boulevard, an expressway above Burlington Street (with speed limit of 60 km/h as you approach the Nikola Tesla Boulevard/QEW terminus) and the lower level an arterial road with a speed limit of 50 km/h.

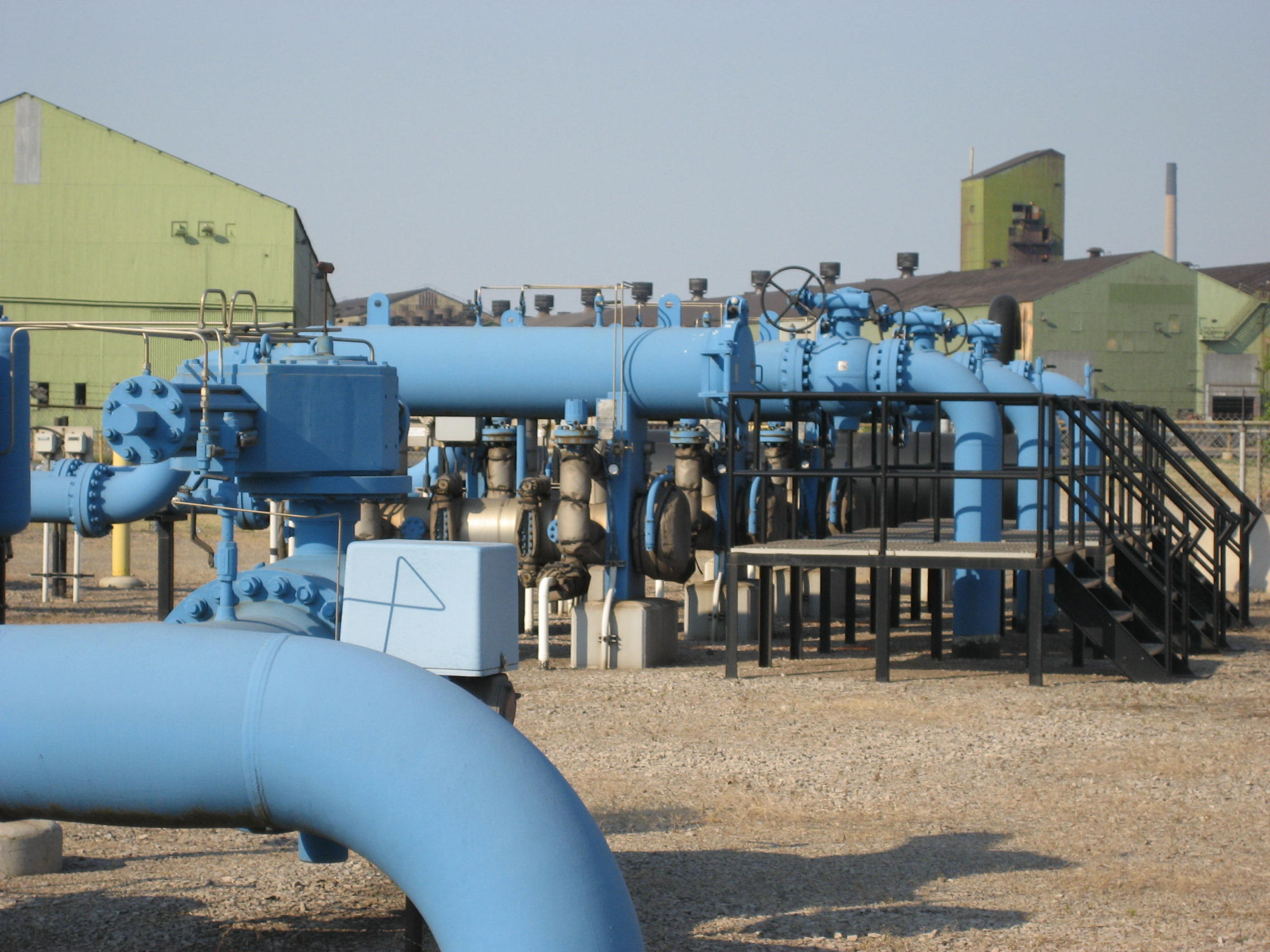
North End Industrial, walking tour

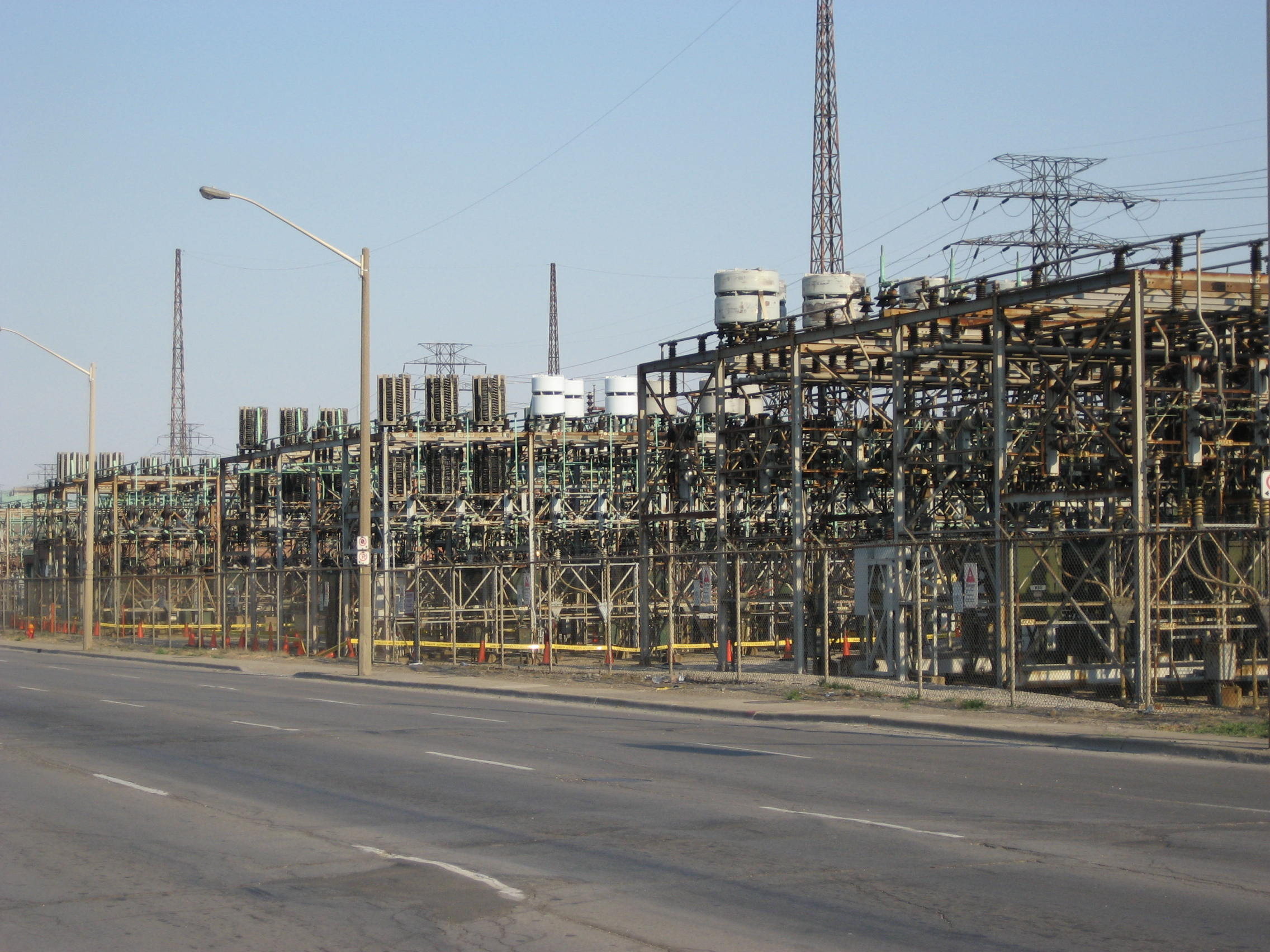
North End Industrial, walking tour

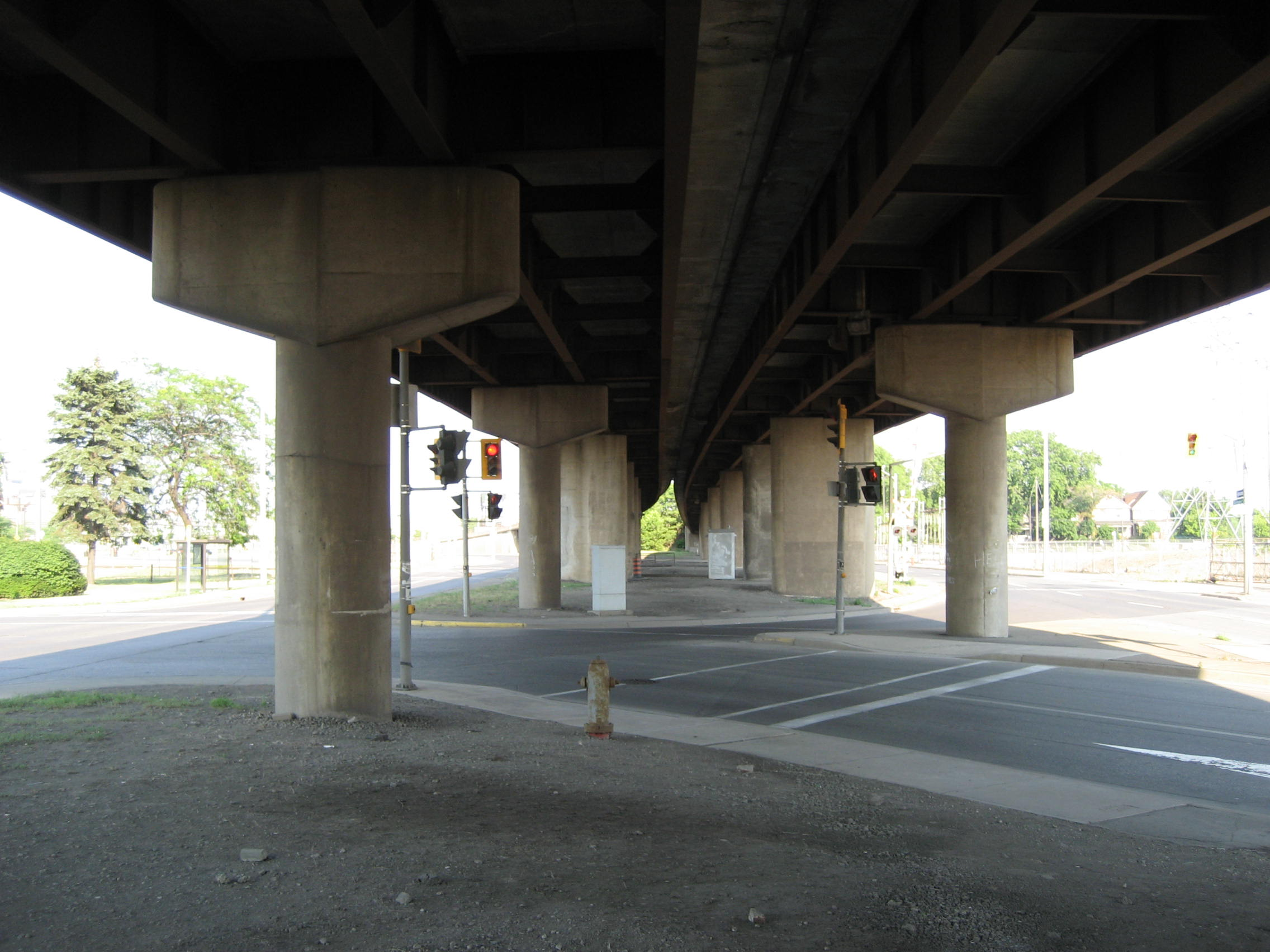
view from below Burlington Street ramp

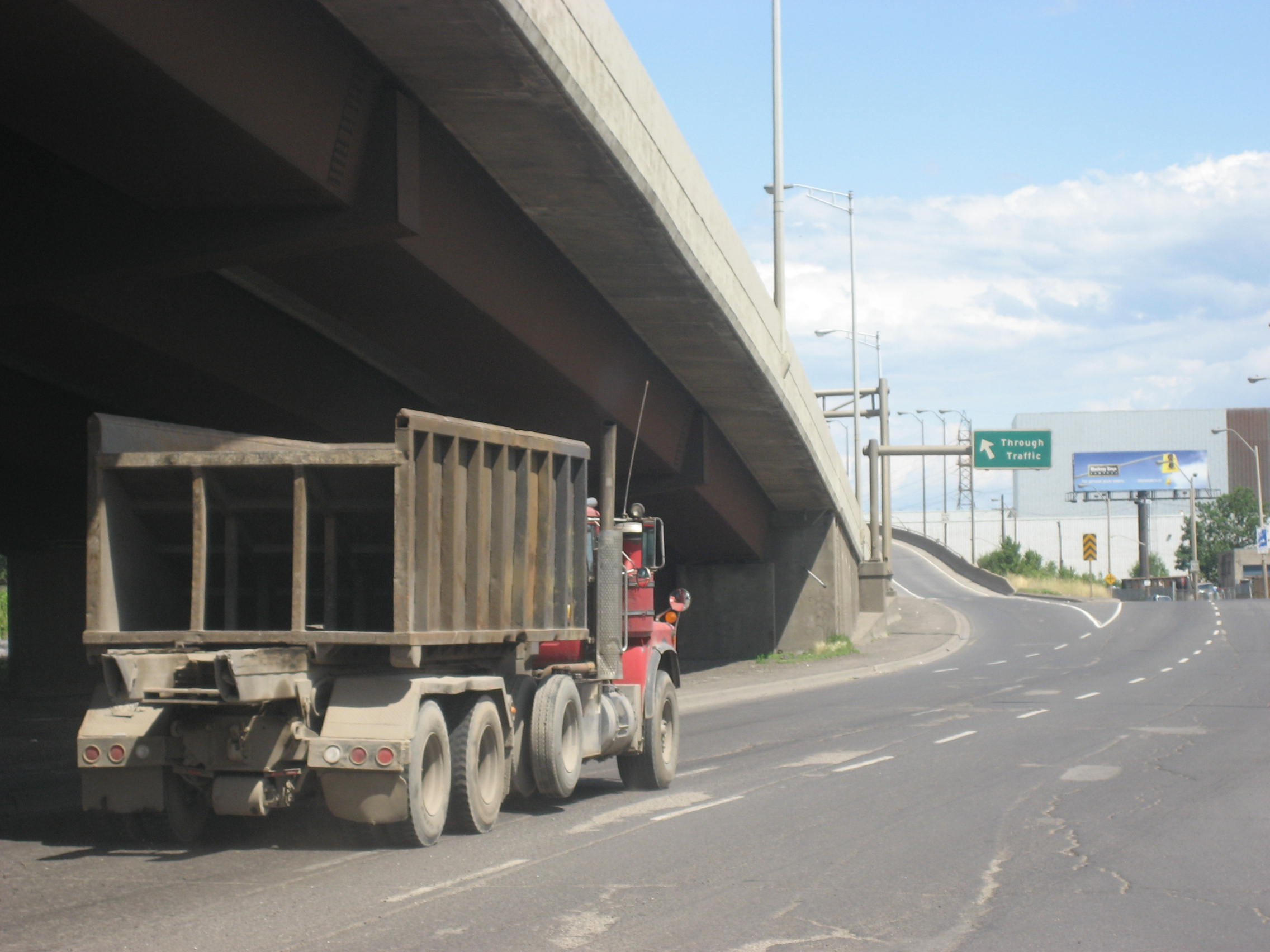
Burlington Street traffic

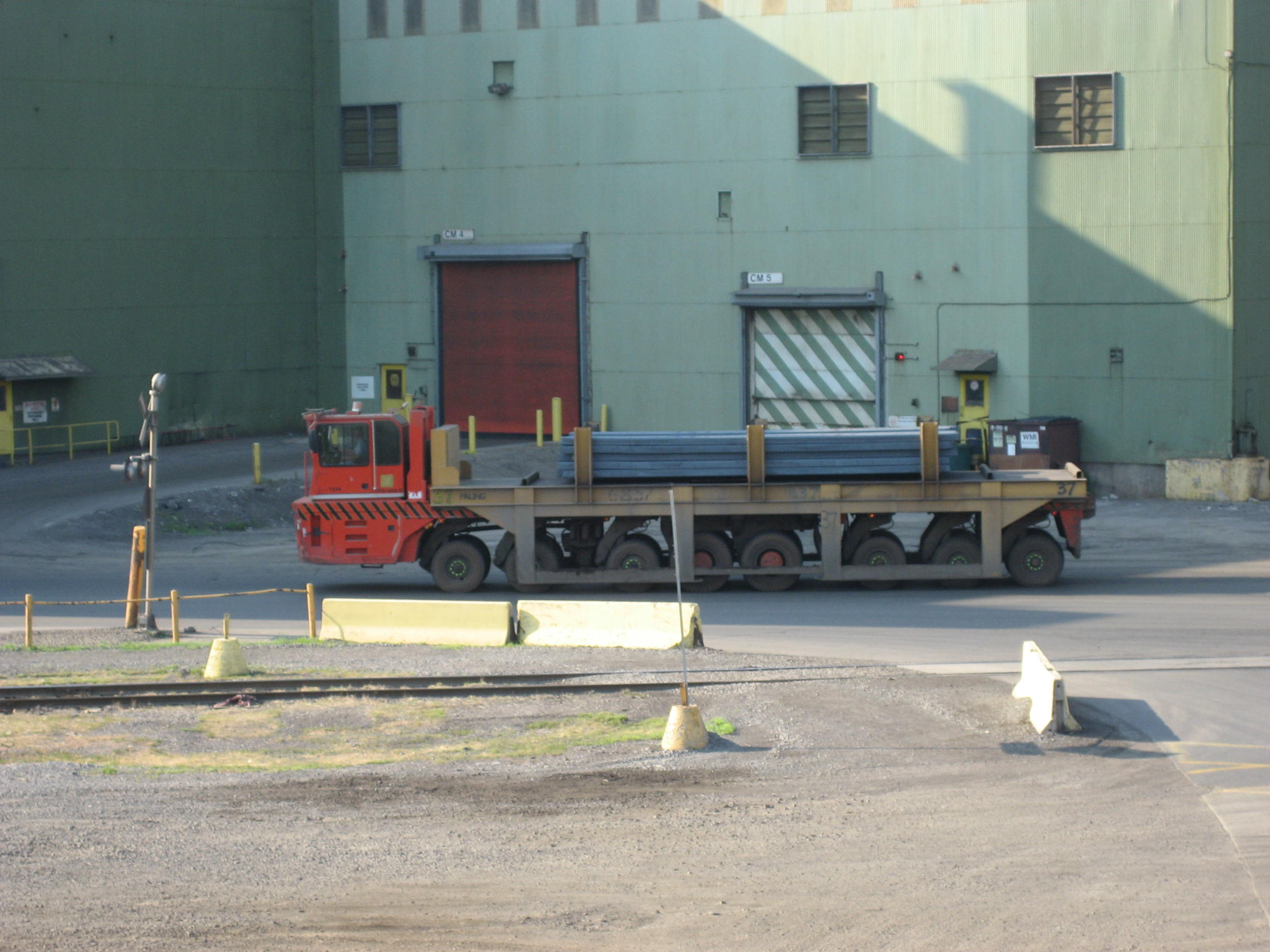
North End Industrial, walking tour

== Images ==
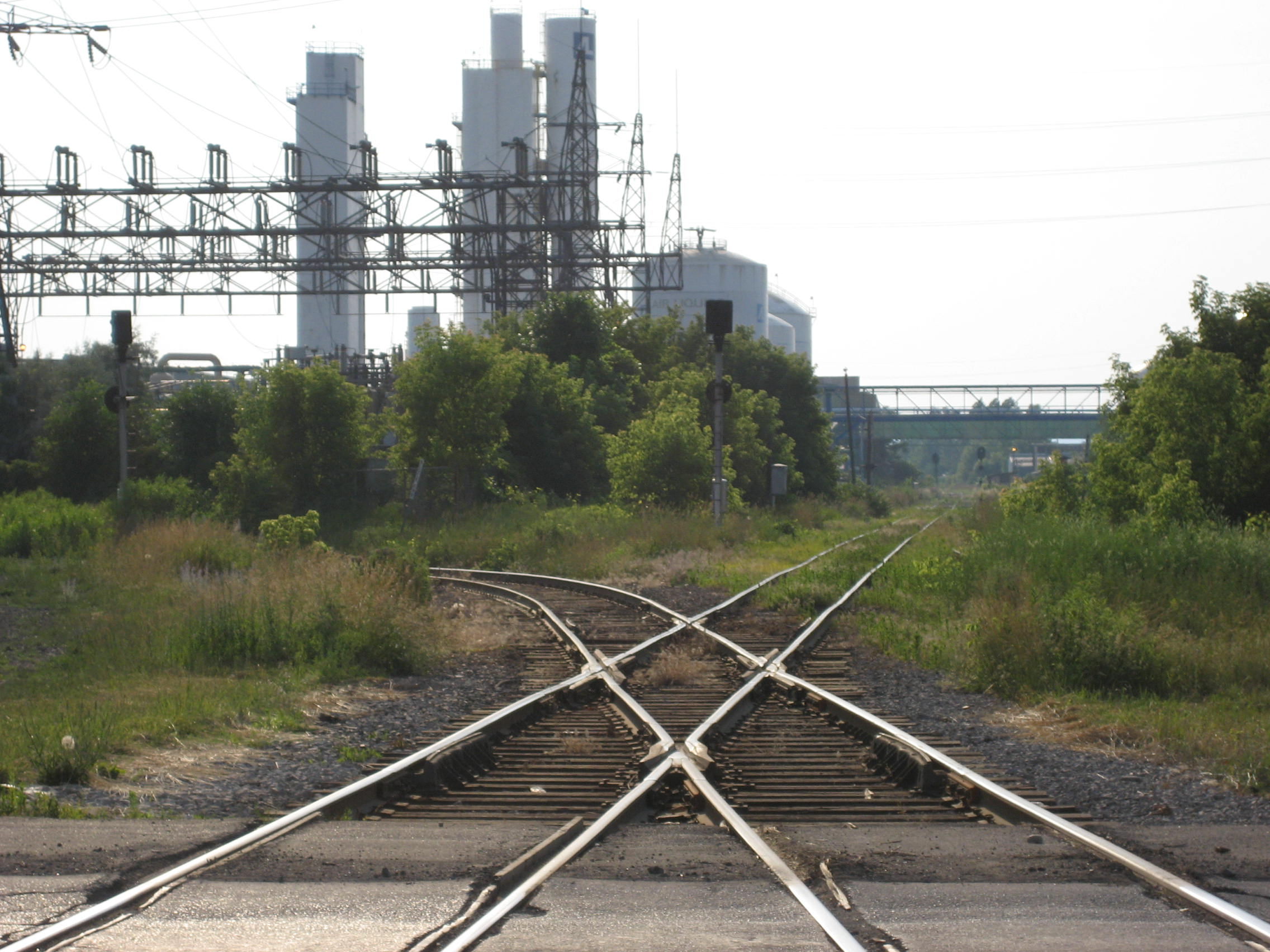
Railway Tracks, Gage Avenue North, near Burlington Street

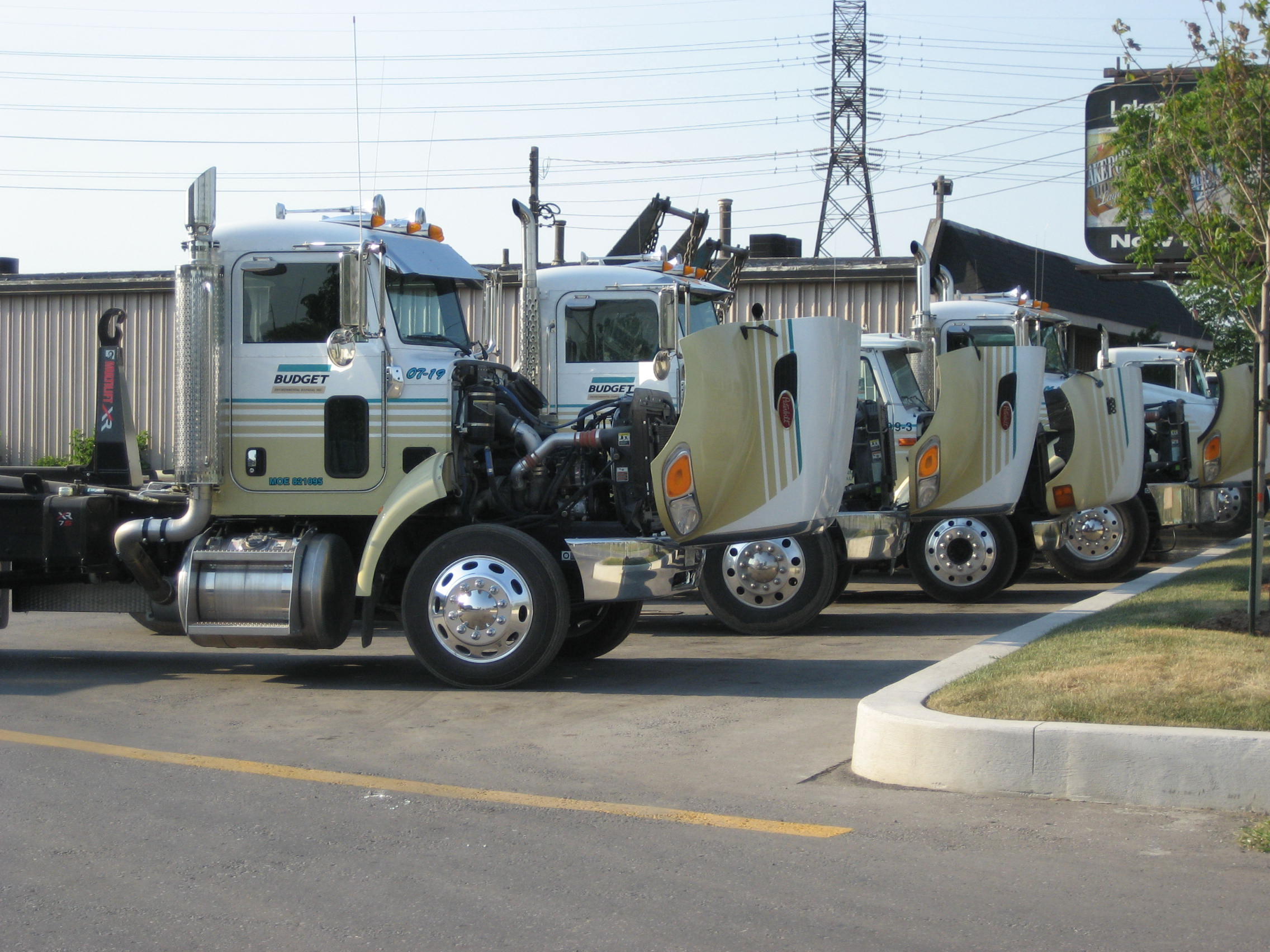
Truck Lot, Gage Avenue North, near Burlington Street

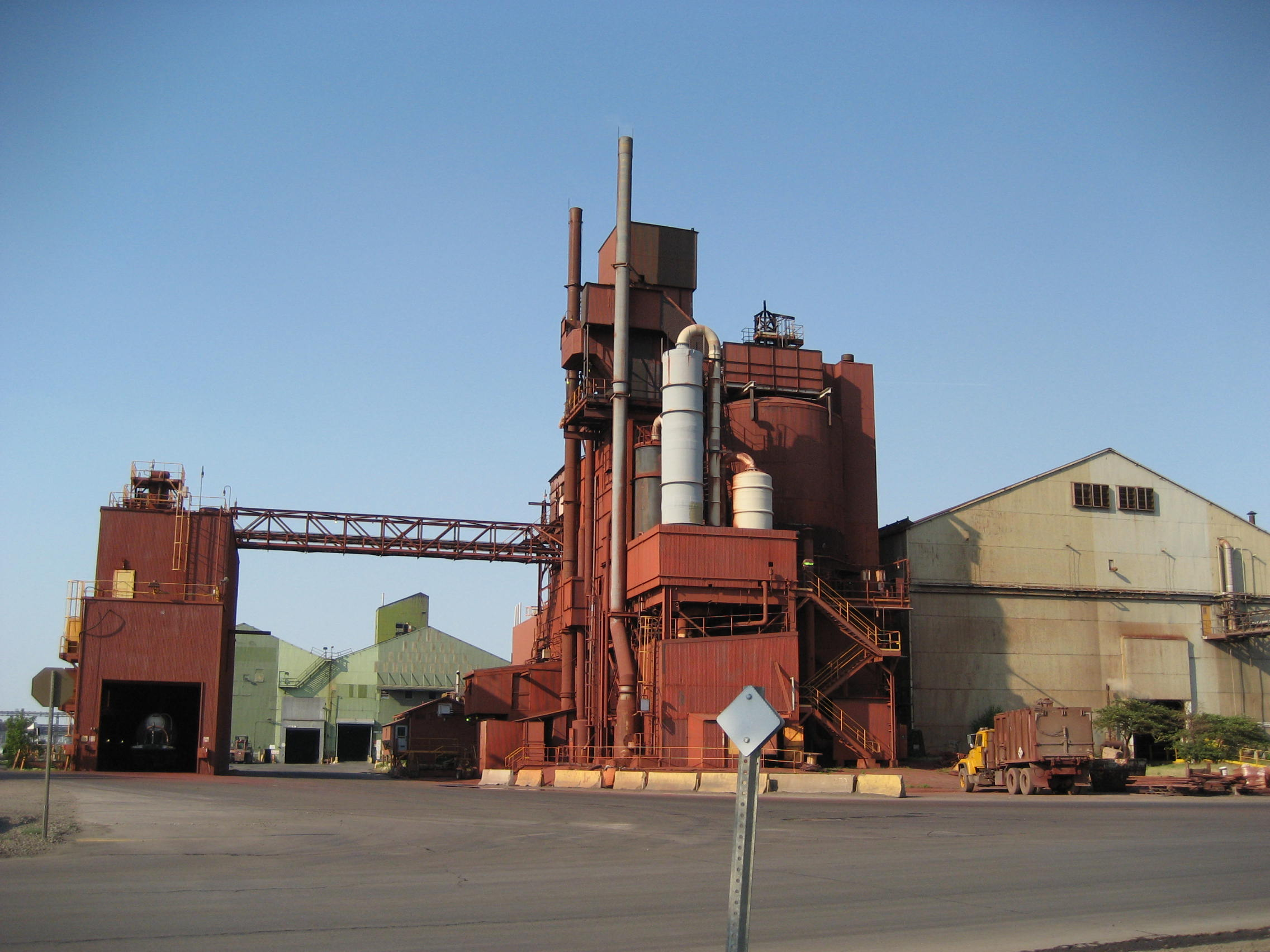
Stelco & North End industrial buildings

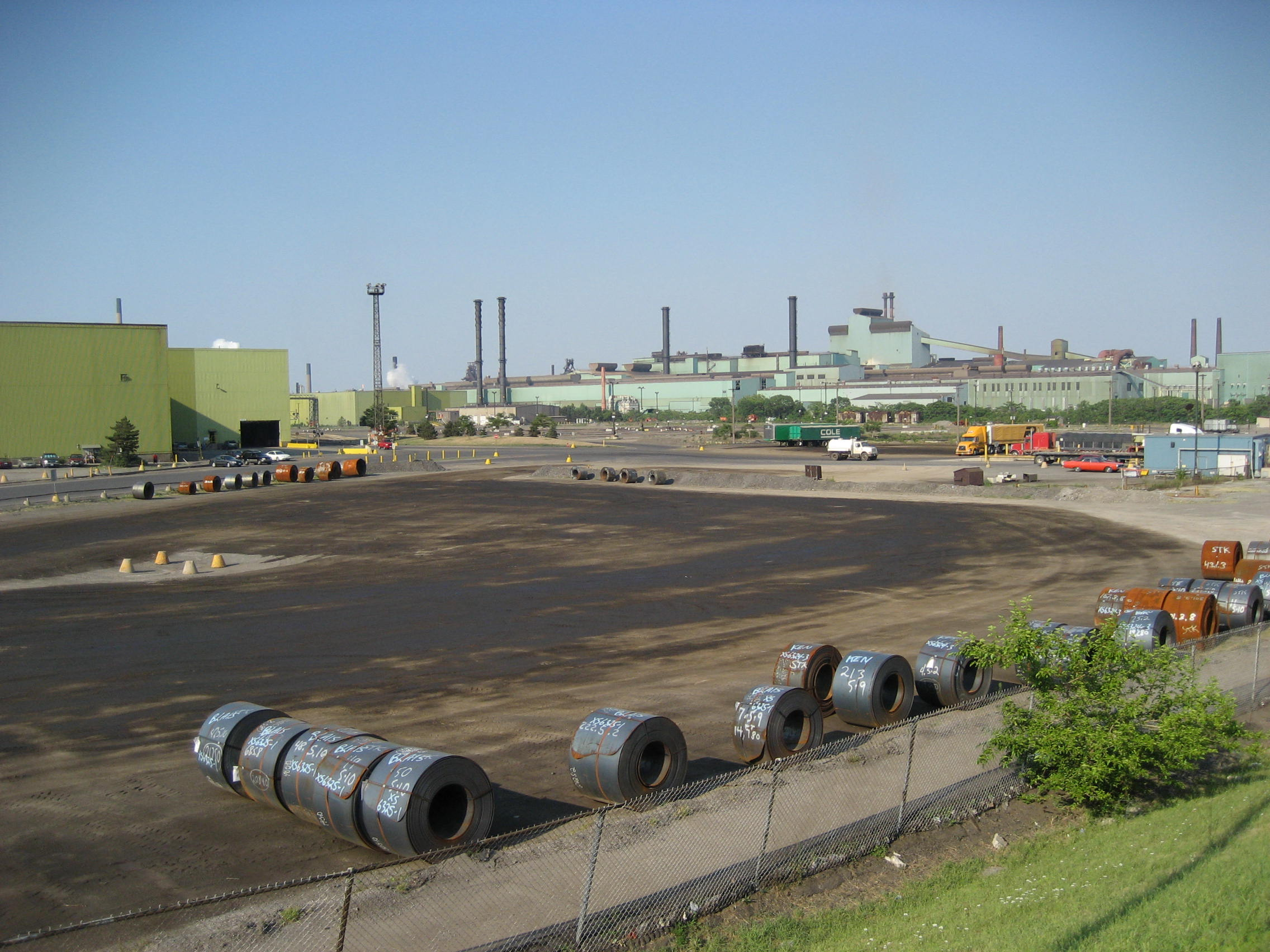
Dofasco & North End industrial buildings
