= North End, Hamilton =

Suburb in Ontario, Canada

Coordinates: 43.2694°N 79.8577°W

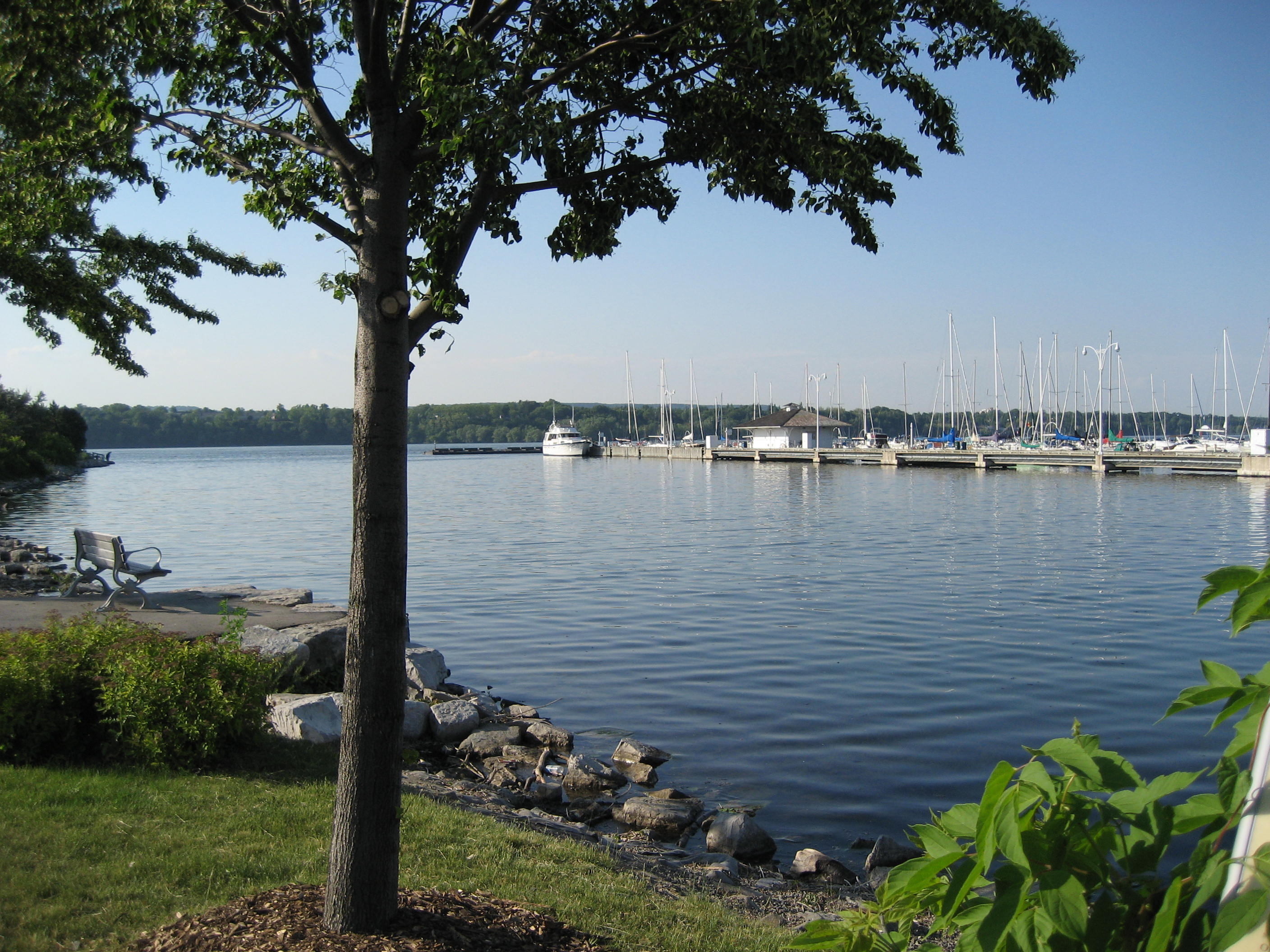
North End's Pier 4 Park

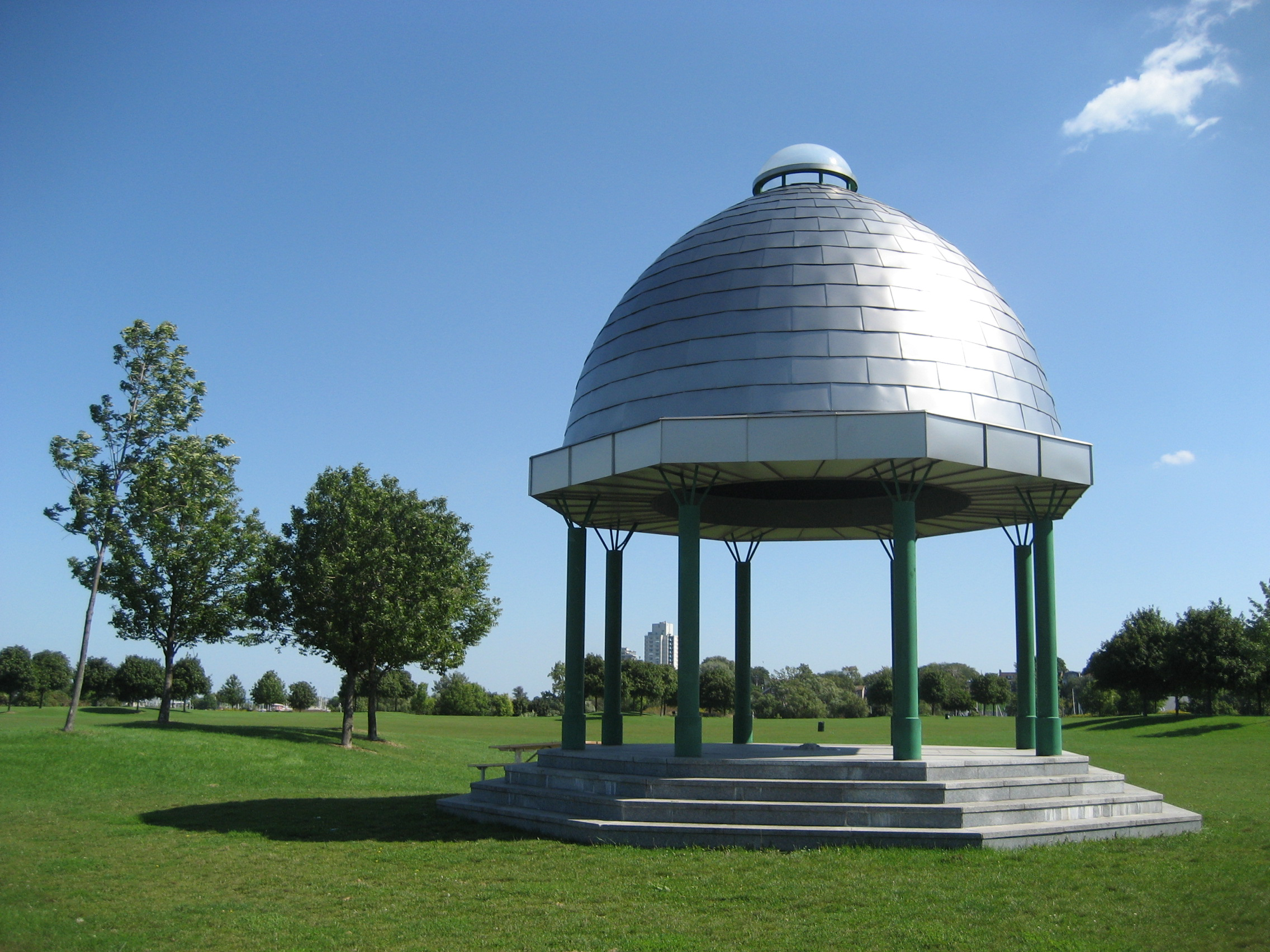
North End's Bayfront Park

The North End is a mostly residential neighbourhood in Hamilton, Ontario, Canada, immediately north of Downtown. The area is bounded by the CNR Railway to the south, Wellington Street to the east, and the Hamilton Harbour on both the north and west sides of the neighbourhood.

The area is home to many of Hamilton's waterfront public spaces, including Pier 4 Park, Bayfront Park, and Pier 7. HMCS Haida, a National Historic Site, is also docked in the neighbourhood.

== History ==
The North End is one of the oldest sections of the city. The area has a long-standing reputation as a blue-collar neighbourhood, dating back to the 1800s. The expansion of economic activities both in the core and at the Port of Hamilton resulted in increased development along the James Street corridor. The neighbourhood has a significant Catholic population, drawing a large number of Irish, Italian and later Portuguese immigrants.

In the 1960s the city built a number of low-income family housing units throughout the North End.

The 2010s brought major changes to the neighbourhood. In 2015, the new West Harbour GO Station was opened on the southern end of the neighborhood. The station brought increased connectivity to Toronto and led to a rise in area housing prices. Most of the area's public housing has since been closed and slated for redevelopment as mixed-income housing. In 2018, the City of Hamilton revealed extensive plans to redevelop the waterfront area in the neighbourhood's western half.

== Demographics ==
Historical populations
Year	Pop.	±%
1996	5,857	—
2006	5,252	−10.3%
2016	4,965	−5.5%
2021	4,816	−3.0%
Source: Statistics Canada

The area is home to a sizeable number of ethnic Portuguese (14.6%) and Italians (9.8%). Visible minorities form 19.2% of the neighbourhoods population, with Black Canadians (7.3%), South Asians (3.5%), and Southeast Asians (3.1%) being the largest groups.

== Notable people ==
- Jackie Washington, jazz and blues singer; namesake of a park in the southeast corner of the neighborhood
