= Bayfront Park (disambiguation) =

Bayfront Park may refer to:

- Bayfront Park in downtown Miami, Florida
- Bayfront Park (Sarasota, Florida)
- Bayfront Park (Daphne, Alabama)
- Bayfront Park (Hamilton, Ontario)
- Bayfront Park (Millbrae, California)
- Bayfront Beach Park in Maryland
