= Pier 4 Park =

Park in Hamilton, Ontario, Canada

Coordinates: 43.2733°N 79.8673°W

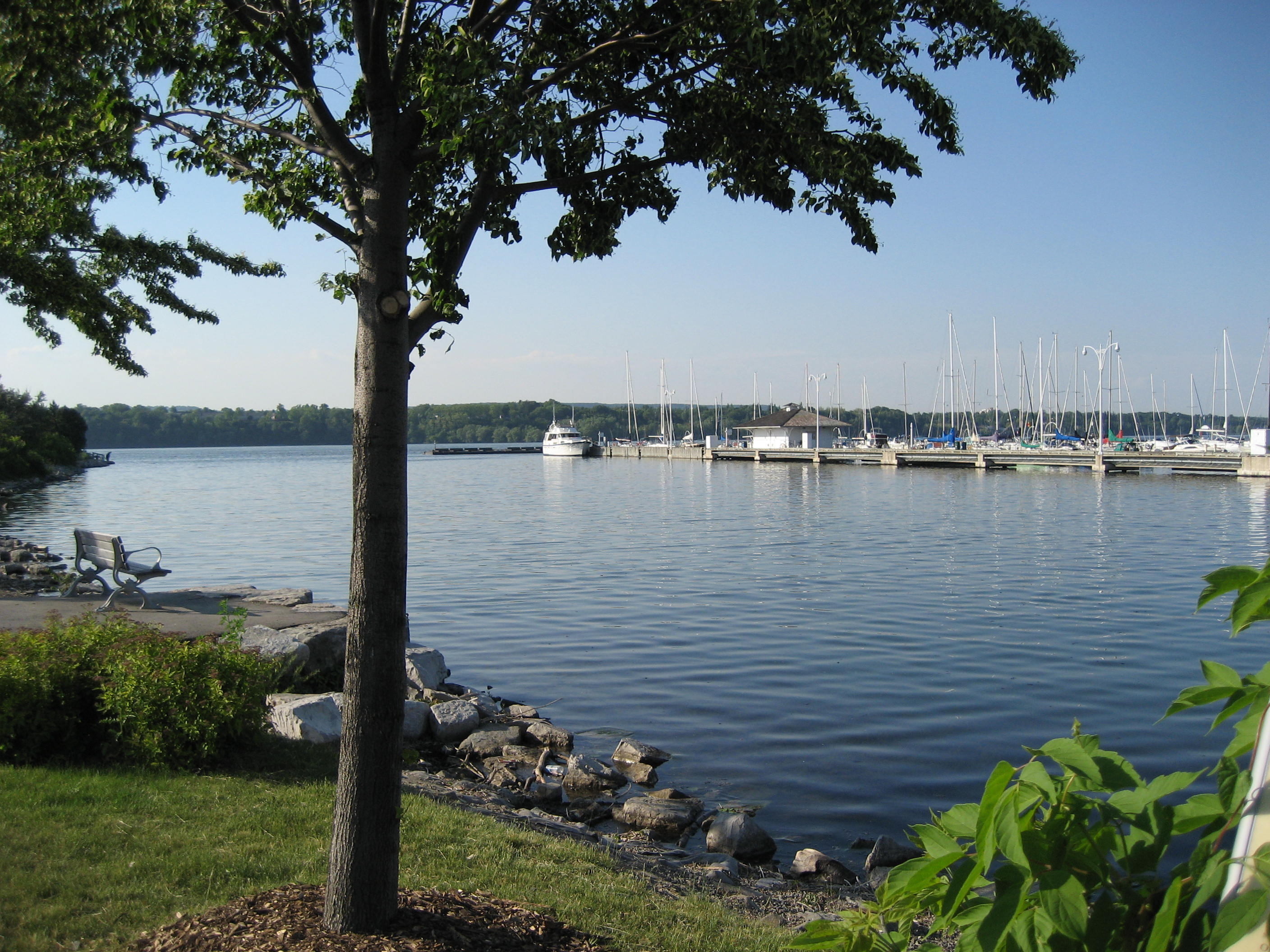
Pier 4 Park

Pier 4 Park is a 2.4 hectare park found in the west-end of Hamilton Harbour near Bay Street North in Hamilton, Ontario, Canada.

The park features a multi-use asphalt trail, 349 metres in length and 4 metres wide which provides barrier-free access to all areas of the park and linkages with the surrounding harbourfront precinct. A total of $2.2 million has been invested for the redevelopment of the park which includes a 24-metre tugboat which acts as the centrepiece of an interactive water play area for children. A dramatically curved lookout pier includes a protected sun shelter and benches to view the marinas, parkland and vistas of the surrounding Bay.

In addition Hamilton Harbour Commissioners (HHC) have constructed Hamilton Pier which provides 0.4 hectares of additional parkland and fish habitat.

Nearby attractions include the Harbour West Marina Complex, Macassa Bay Yacht Club, Pier 8, Bayfront Park, HHC Sailing School and the Royal Hamilton Yacht Club.

== Images ==
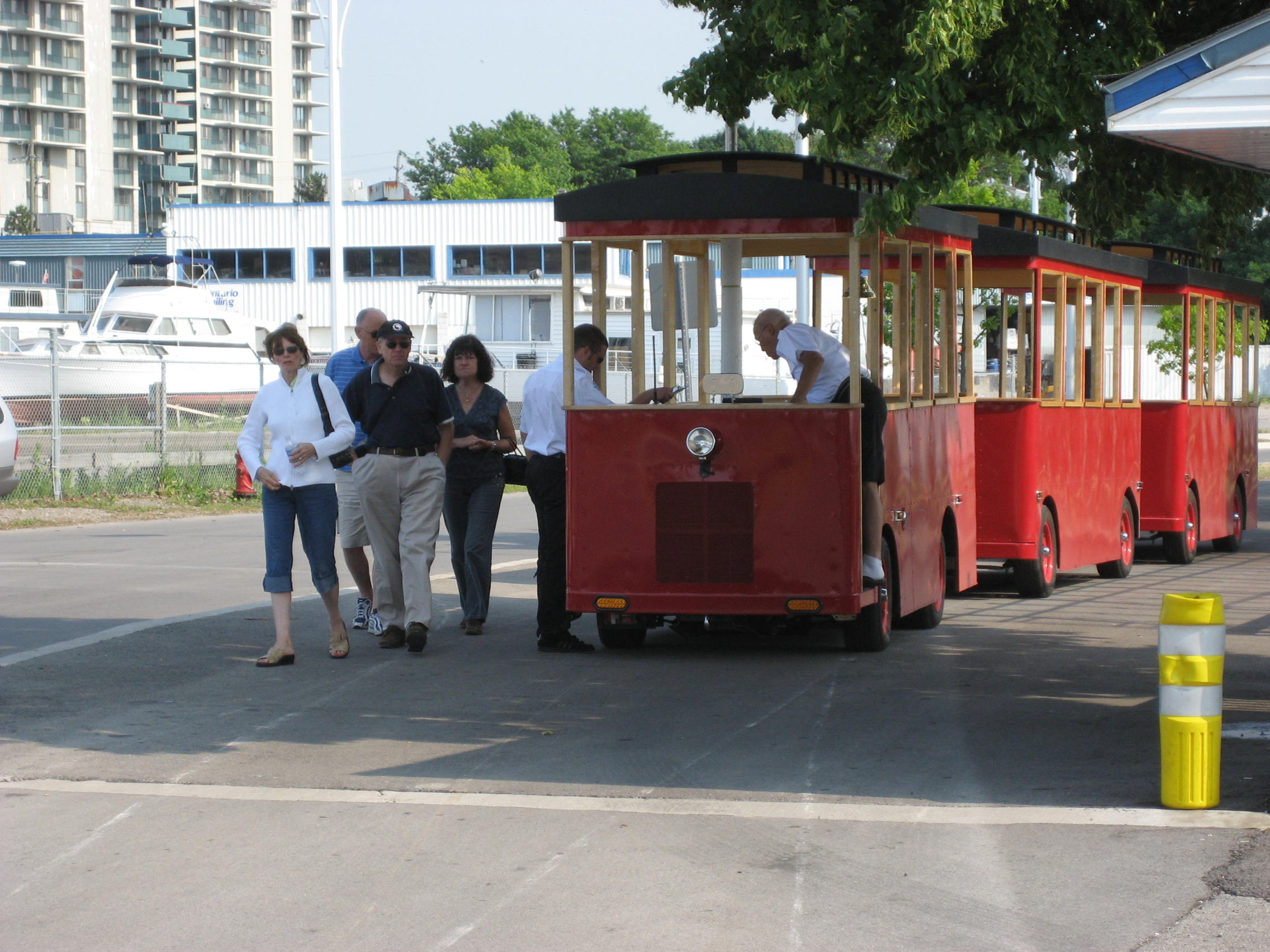
Waterfront trolley

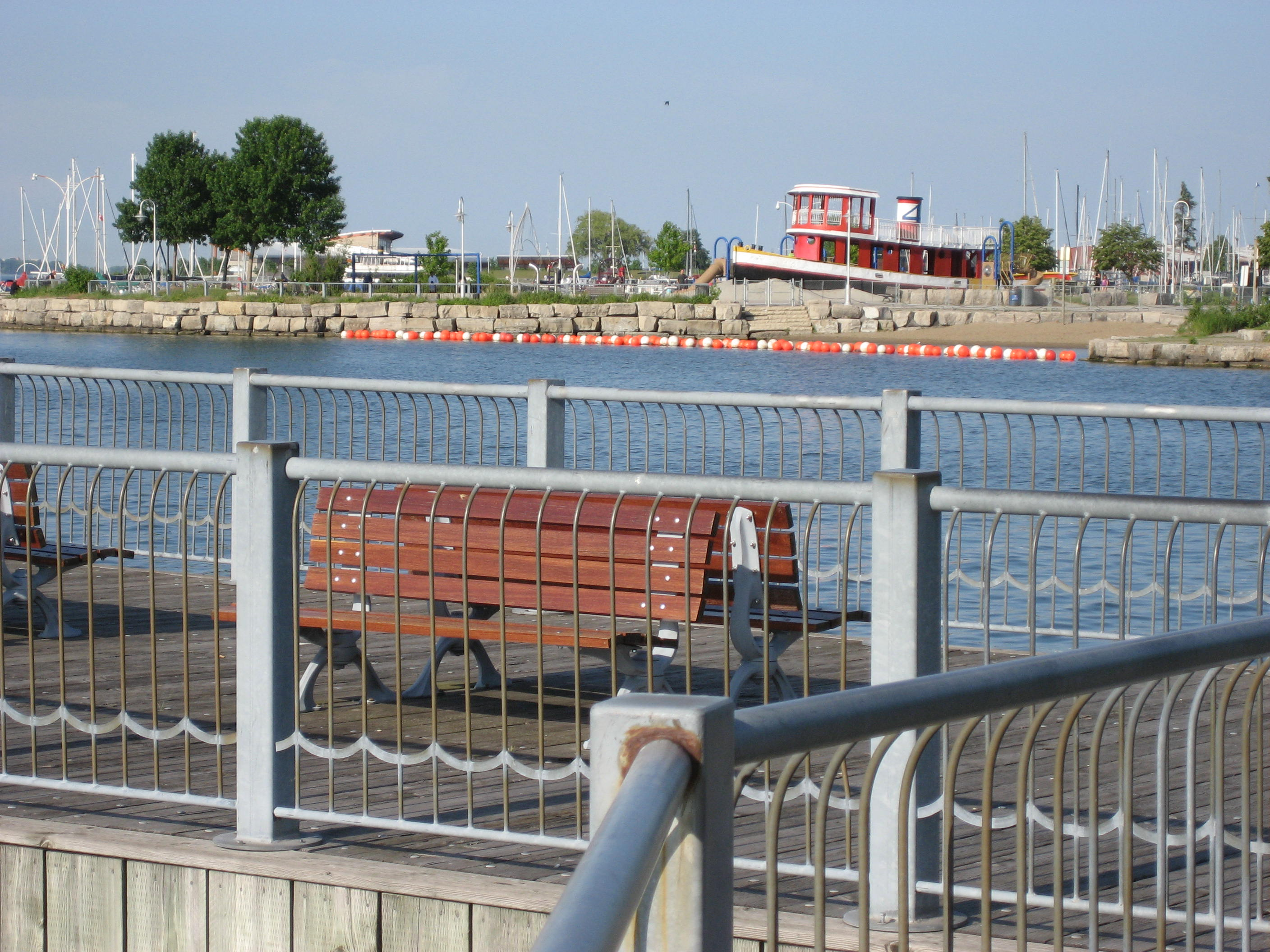
Pier 4 Park, Boardwalk

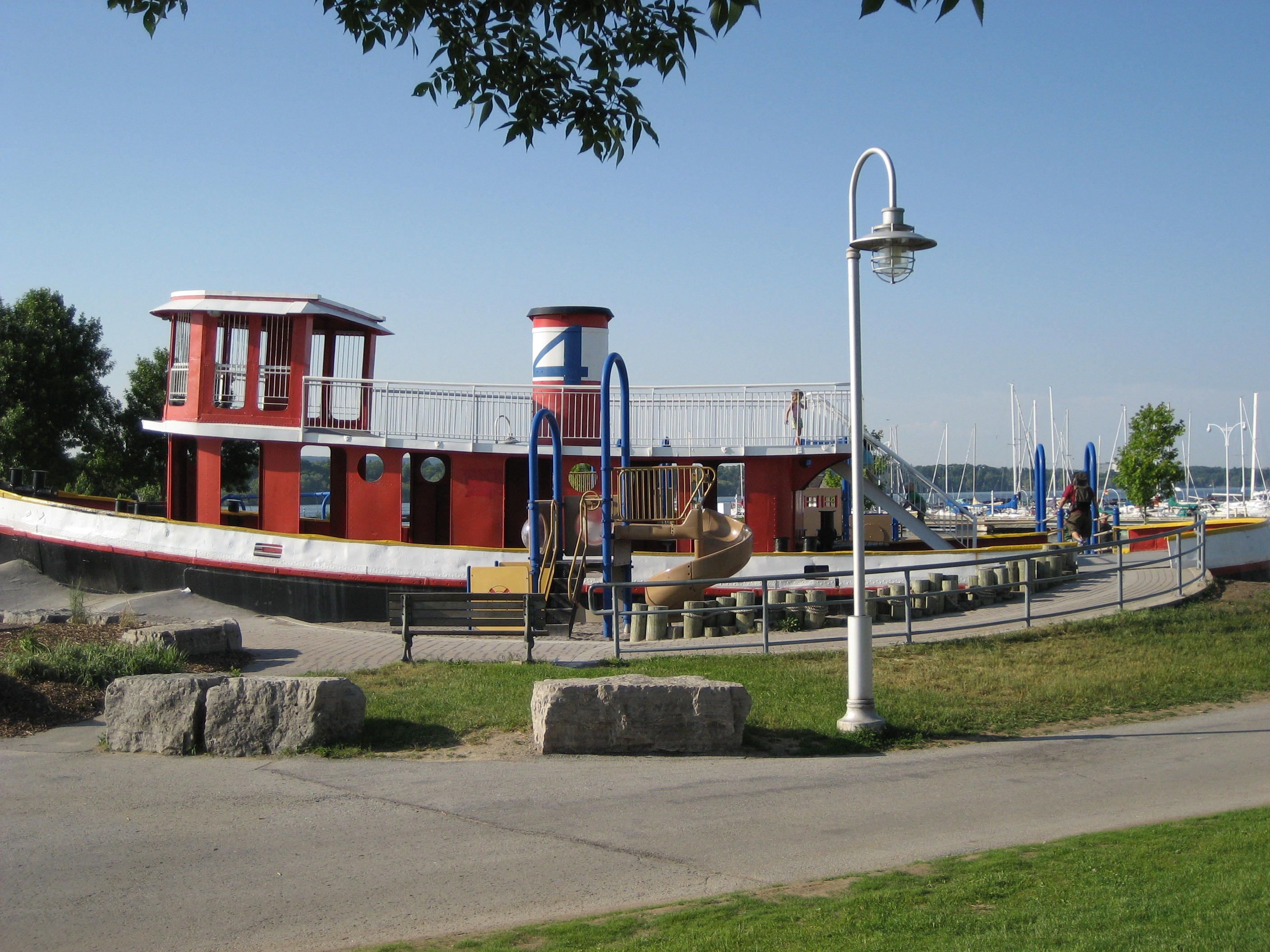
Tugboat, Playground, Pier 4 Park

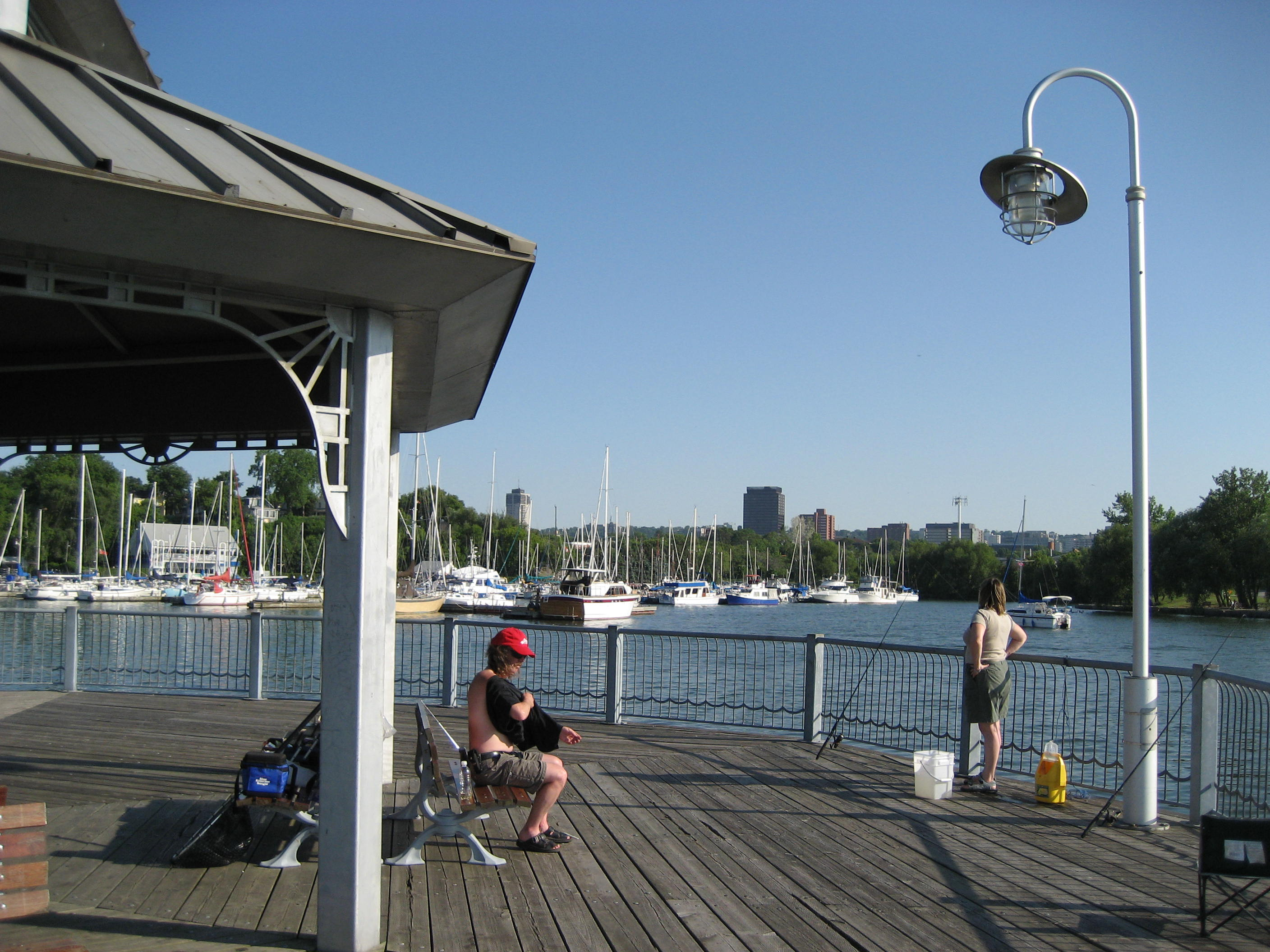
Pier 4 Park, Boardwalk
