= Bayfront Park (Hamilton, Ontario) =

Park in Hamilton, Ontario, Canada

Coordinates: 43°16′15″N 79°52′20″W

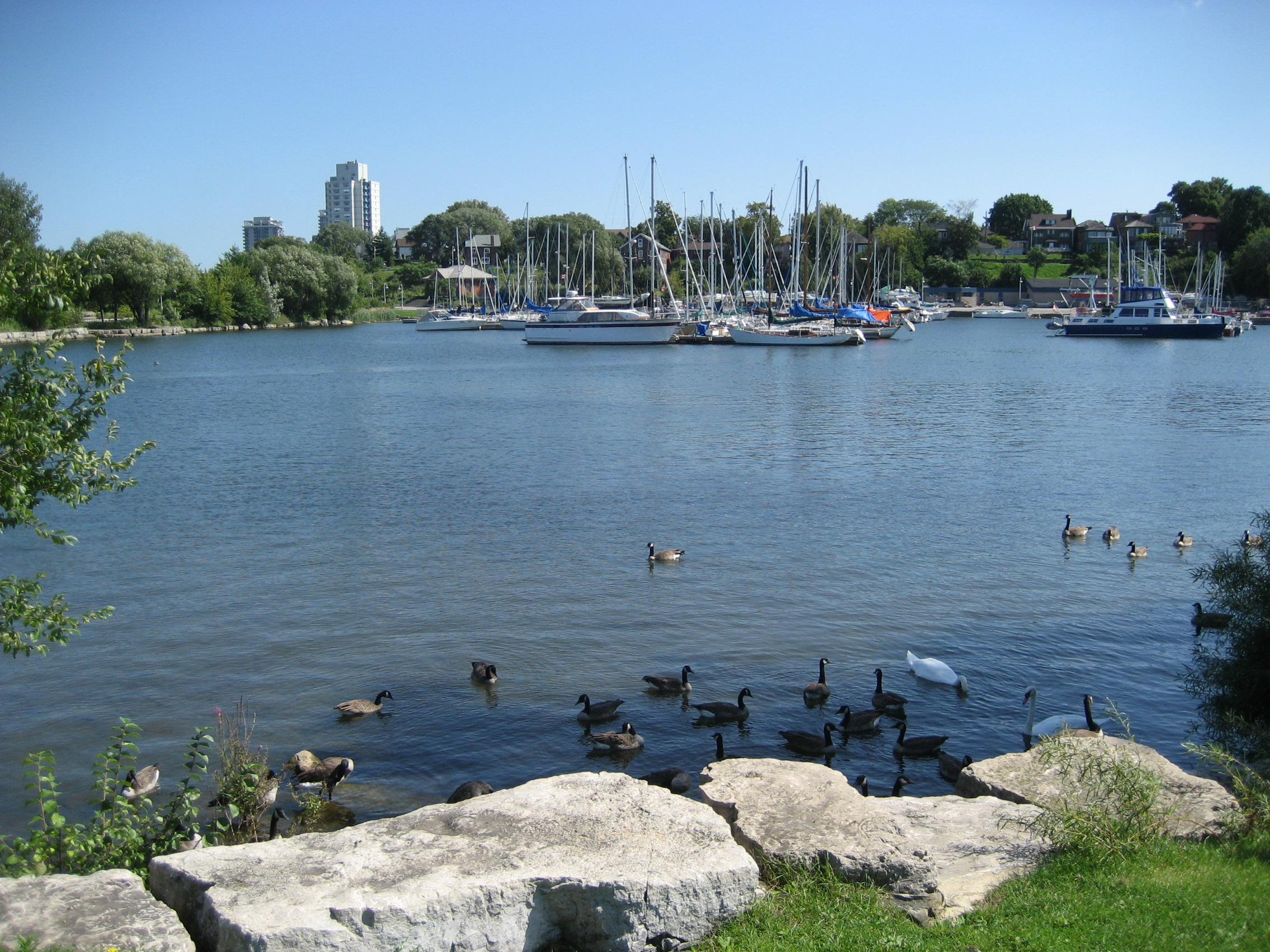
Bayfront Park

Bayfront Park is a 16-hectare (40-acre) park found in the West-end of Hamilton Harbour in the North End neighbourhood of Hamilton, Ontario, Canada.

Over $9 million transformed formerly vacant land into a versatile green space, with 1,800 metres (5,906 ft) of shoreline integrating fish habitat, native vegetation, and facilities. The park is the site of a variety of summer festivals and concerts. A protected sandy beach and a 6-metre (20 ft) wide trail circle the park.

Other important features of the park include a public boat launch, fishing opportunities, a 250 space parking lot, and pedestrian and bicycle trails leading to Pier 4 Park.

Nearby attractions include the Harbour West Marina Complex, Macassa Bay Yacht Club, Pier 4 Park, Pier 8, HHC Sailing School, and the Royal Hamilton Yacht Club.

== Images ==
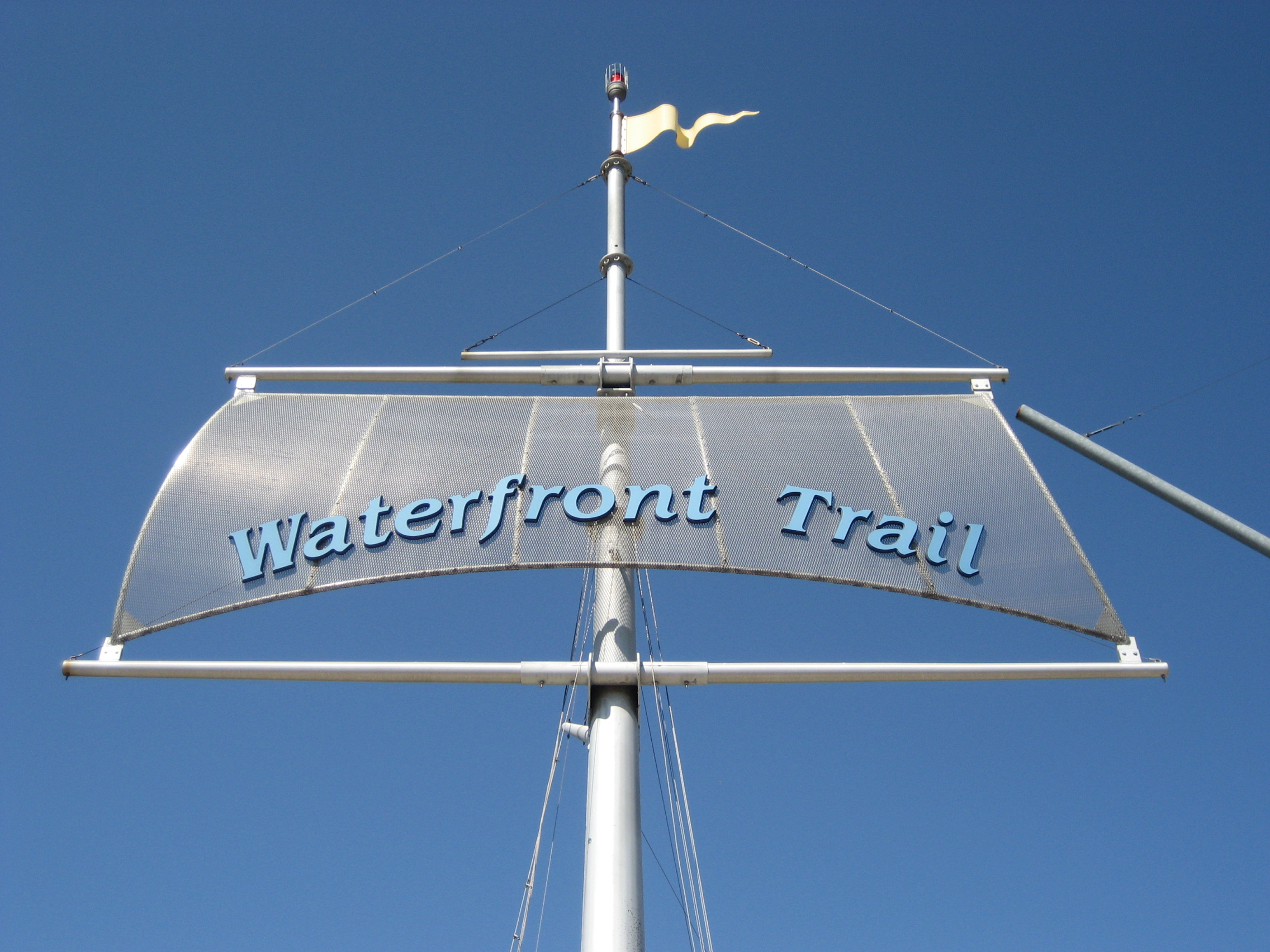
WaterFront Trail Sign

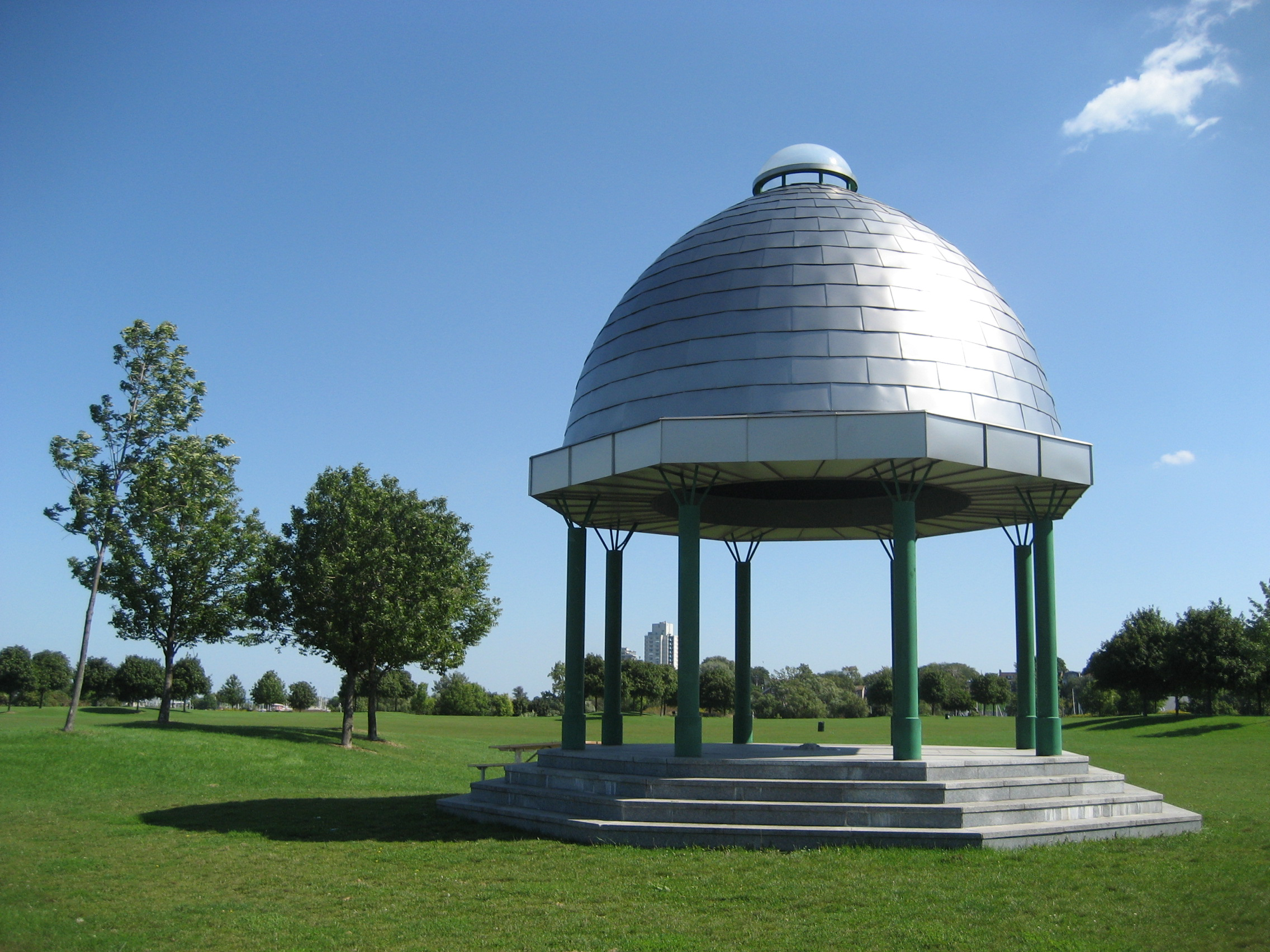
Argyll & Sutherland Highlanders Memorial Pavilion

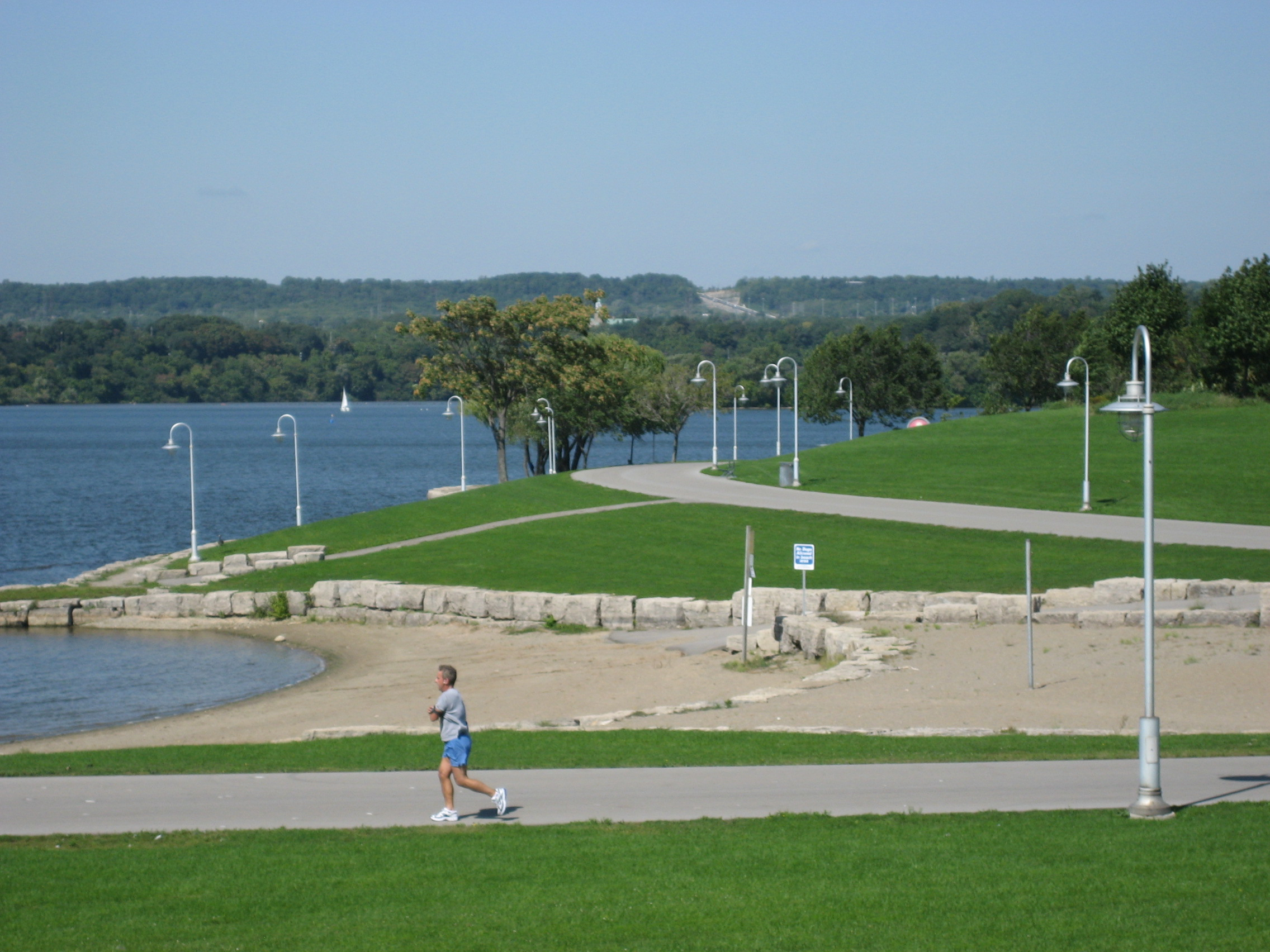
BayFront Beach

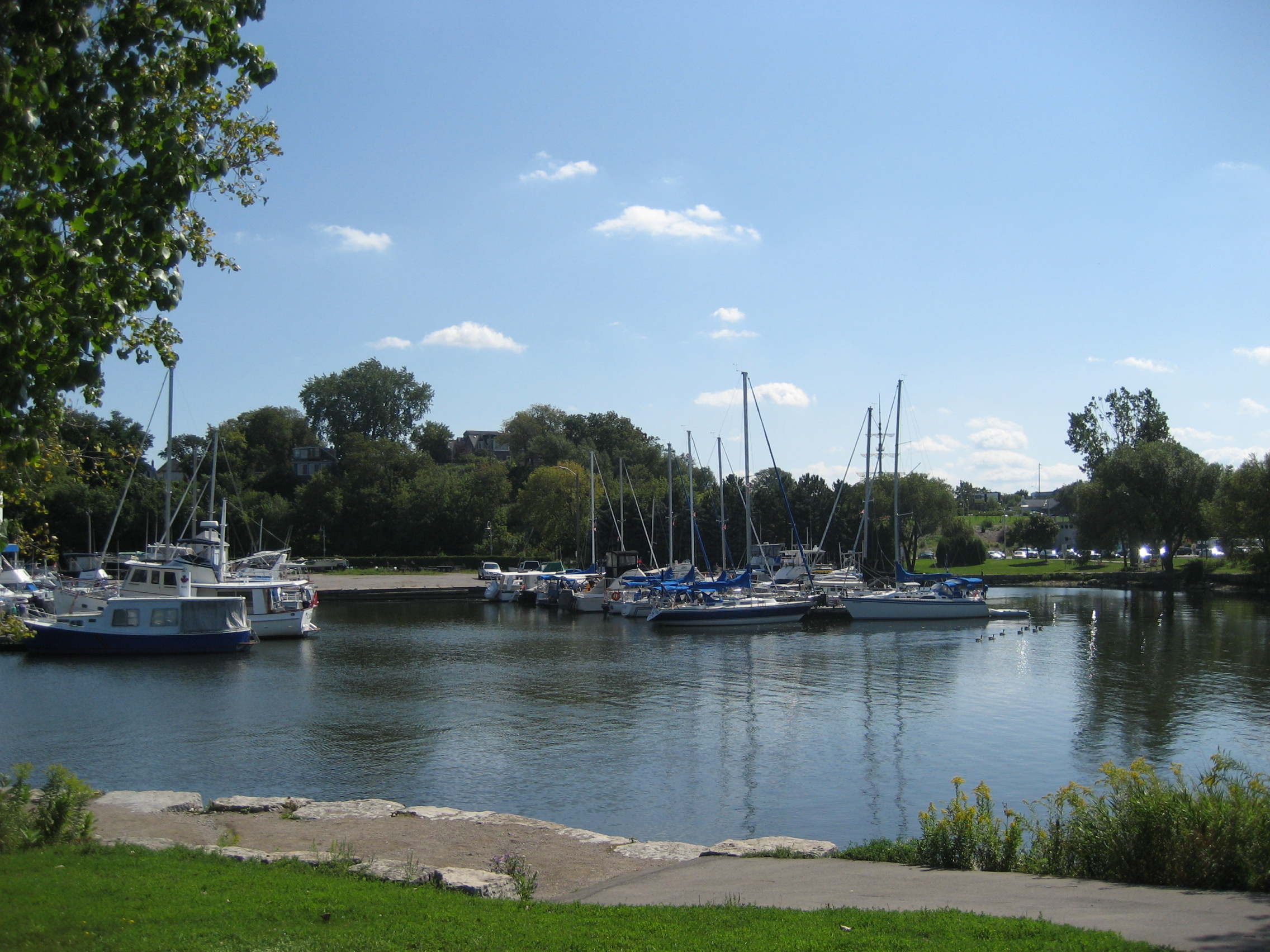
Macassa Bay
