= Bay Street (Hamilton, Ontario) =

Road in Hamilton, Ontario, Canada

Coordinates: 43.2682°N 79.8693°W

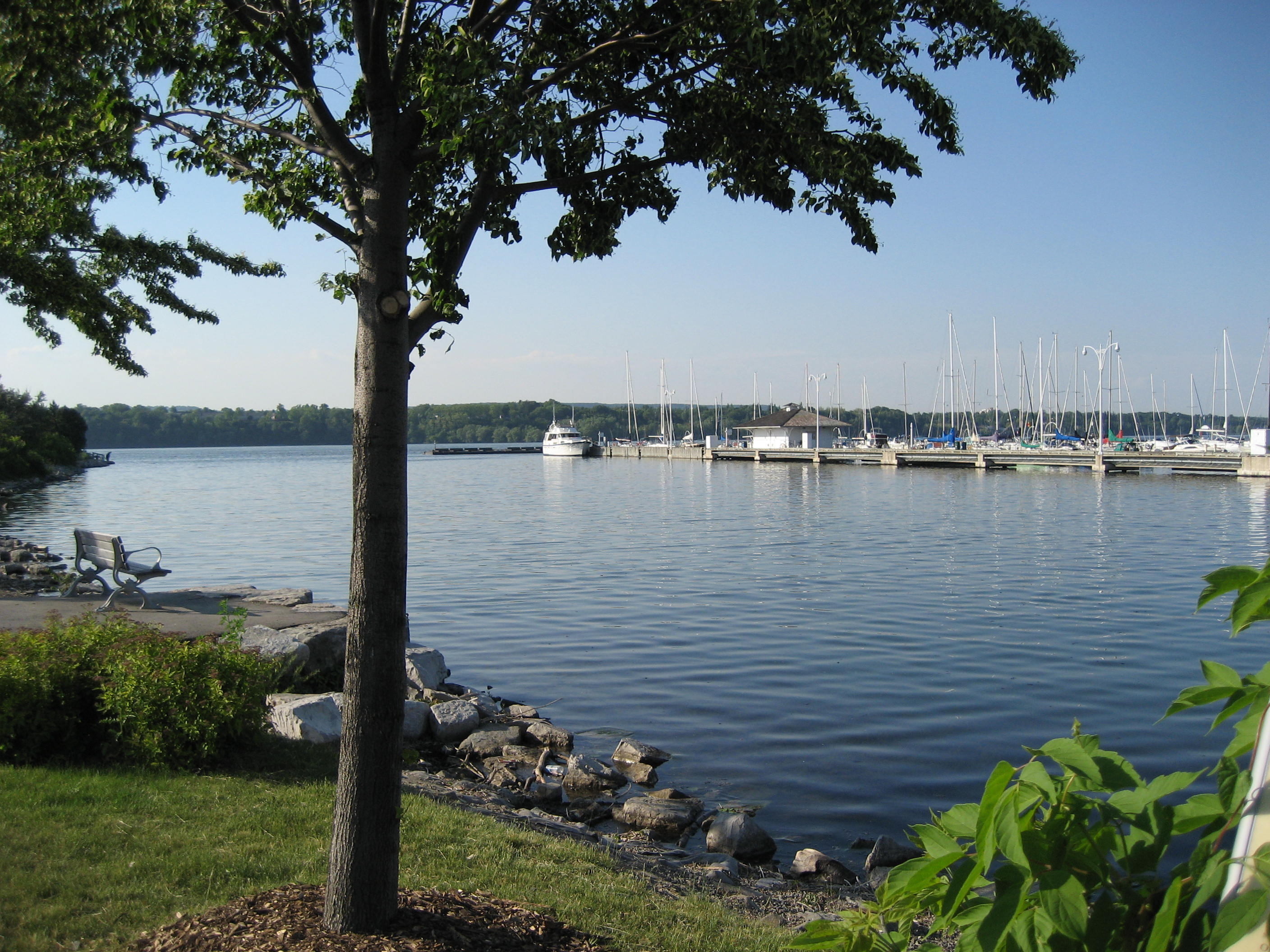
Pier 4 Park

Bay Street is a lower city arterial road in Hamilton, Ontario, Canada. It starts at Inglewood Drive, just South of Aberdeen Avenue, as a collector road with only two lanes, then eventually becomes a six lane thoroughfare at its peak. Bay Street also passes through downtown Hamilton, where many high-rise buildings are found. Bay Street is a one-way street from Aberdeen Avenue to Cannon Street West. Bay Street continues as an arterial route to Strachan Street, where it is downgraded to a neighbourhood collector and eventually ends at a curb at Pier 4 Park at Burlington Street in the city's North End.

== History ==
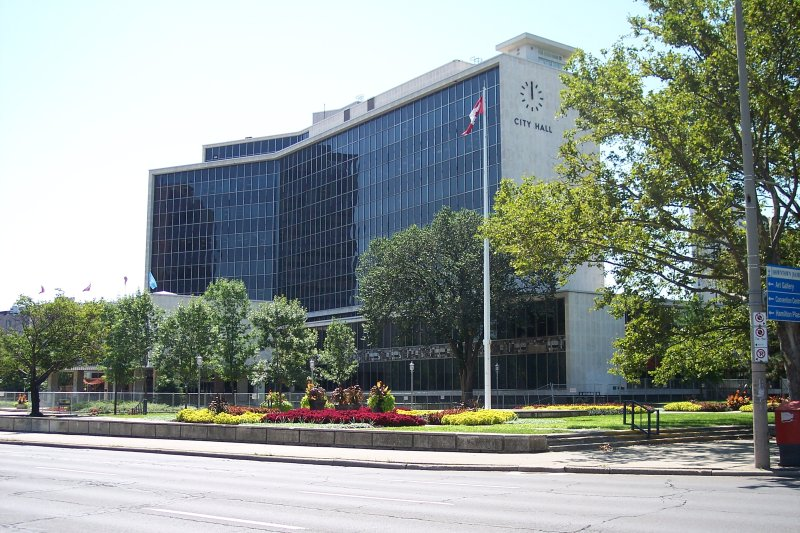
Hamilton City Hall.

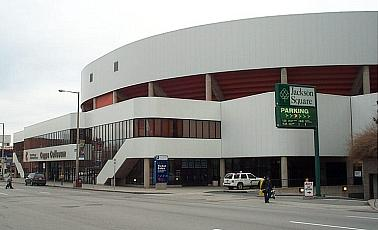
TD Coliseum

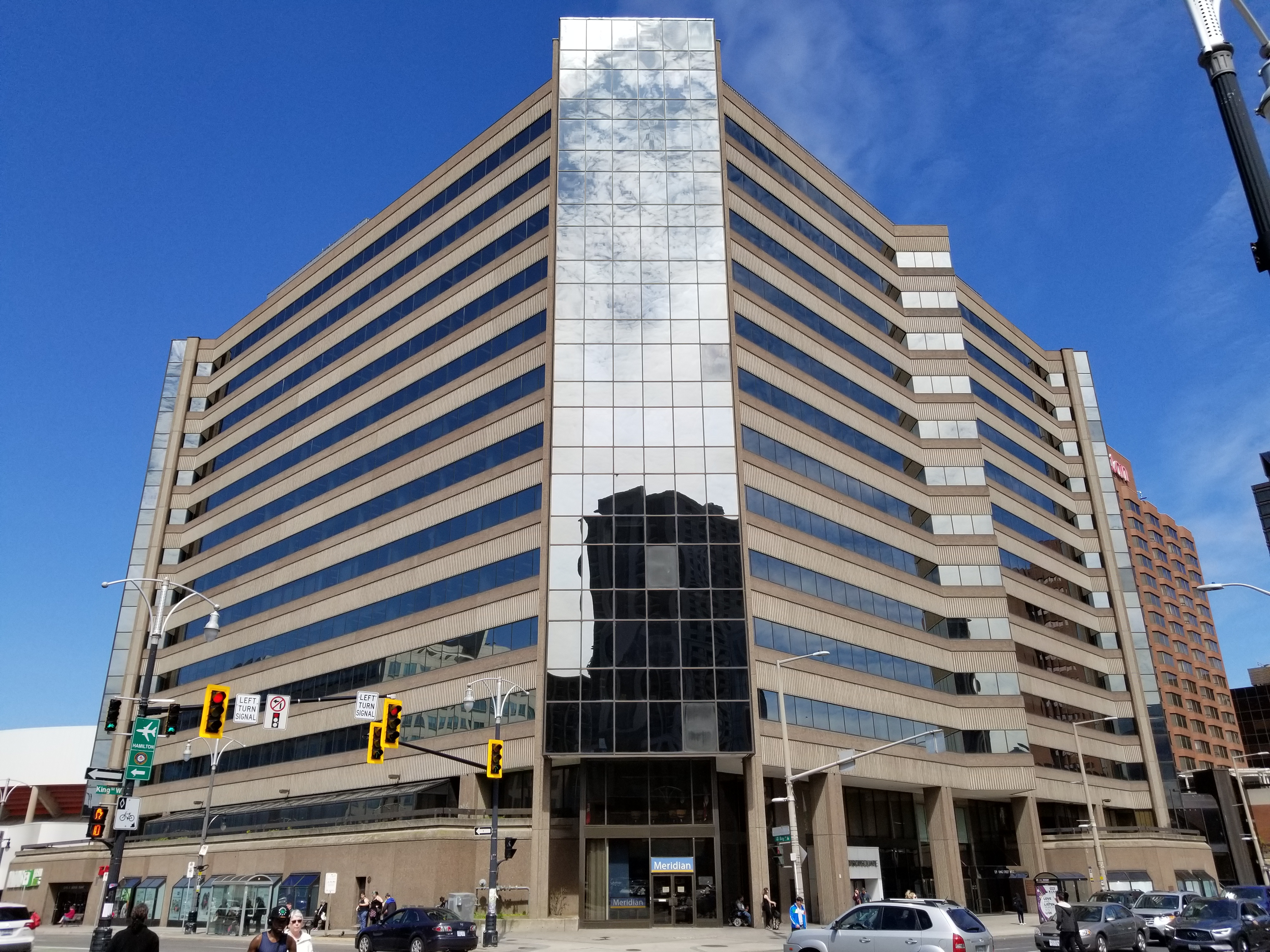
120 King Street West

Bay Street derives its name from its proximity to Hamilton Harbour, which was Burlington Bay until 1919.

The Bay Street Urban Renewal was completed in 2006. This project was made possible through investments by the Governments of Canada, Government of Ontario and the City of Hamilton.

Jackson Square, is a mall and is part of Hamilton's "Super Block", which includes the Hamilton Public Library, 100 King Street West, TD Coliseum, Sheraton Hamilton, the Hamilton Farmer's Market, 120 King Street West and the former Eaton's Centre now known as the Hamilton City Centre. It is also known as an "indoor core connector" to the Hamilton Convention Centre/Ellen Fairclough Building), Art Gallery of Hamilton and FirstOntario Concert Hall across the street: all three downtown landmarks are connected to the mall by a skywalk that crosses over King to Jackson Square.

TD Coliseum (formerly Copps Coliseum, FirstOntario Centre, and Hamilton Arena), is a sports and entertainment arena with a capacity of up to 19,000 (depending on event type and configuration) on the corner of Bay Street North and York Boulevard. It was named after the former Hamilton mayor, Victor K. Copps. Construction began in 1983 and was completed in 1985 at a cost of $33.5 million, and an addition $2.3 million for a parking garage. The construction was overseen by local Hamiltonian, Joseph Pigott. In 1987, #99 Wayne Gretzky and #66 Mario Lemieux combined forces to capture the Canada Cup at TD Coliseum as Team Canada defeated the Russians. Canada wins series 2 games to one. All three games ended in 6-to-5 scores. In 1999, Detroit Rock City was filmed at the TD Coliseum starring the Rock group Kiss. In 2004, TD Coliseum was used again to film Meg Ryan's Against the Ropes.

Herkimer Apartments, on the corner of Bay Street South and Herkimer Street, was the first Hamilton apartment installed with an elevator, which ran from the basement to the fifth floor. A New York-style structure was built of fireproof reinforced concrete dressed in rug brick with white, glazed terracotta trim. The building today looks much as it did when it opened in July 1915, minus a wooden pergola that once graced the roof.

== Festivals ==
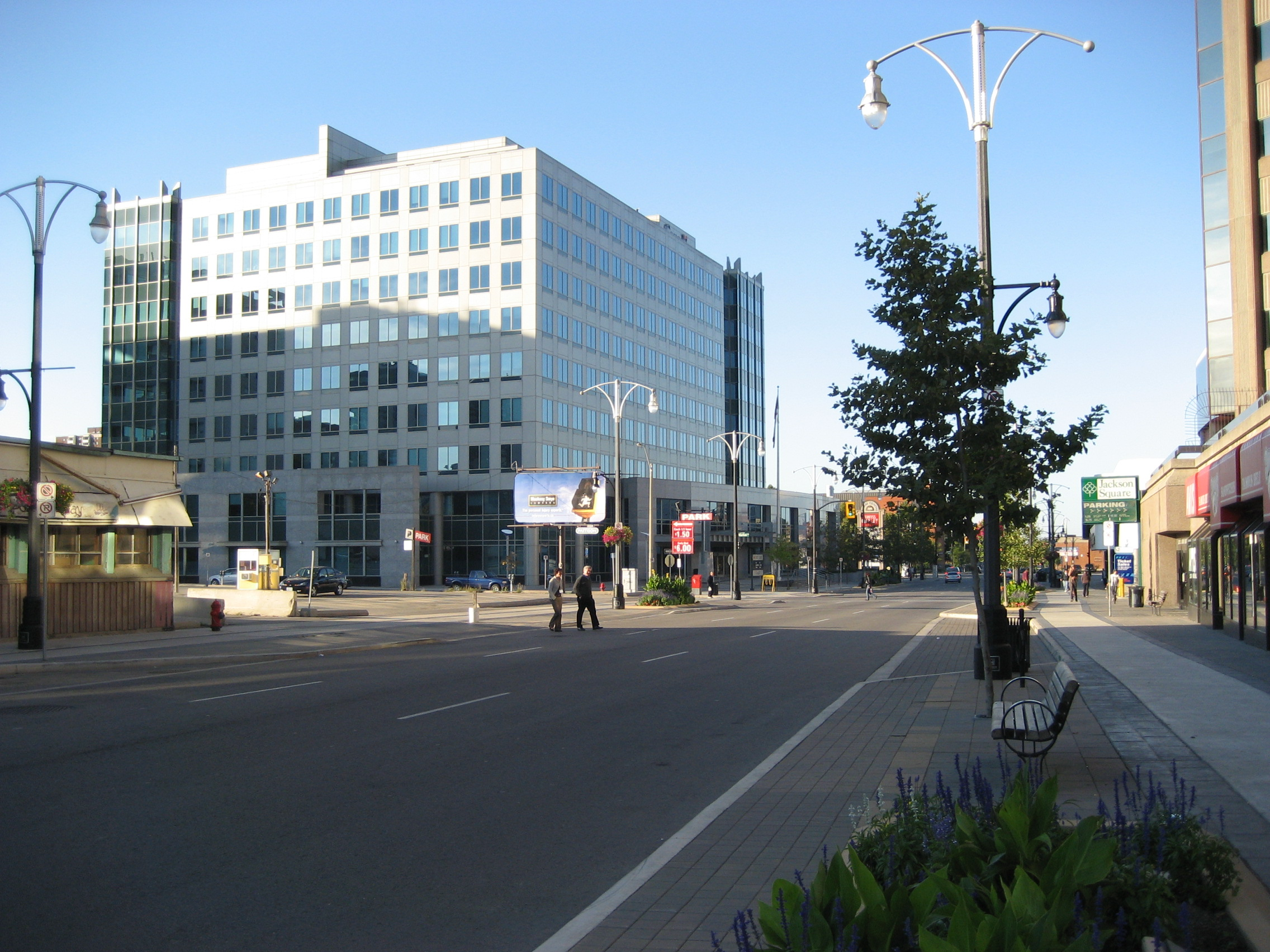
Federal Building, looking North

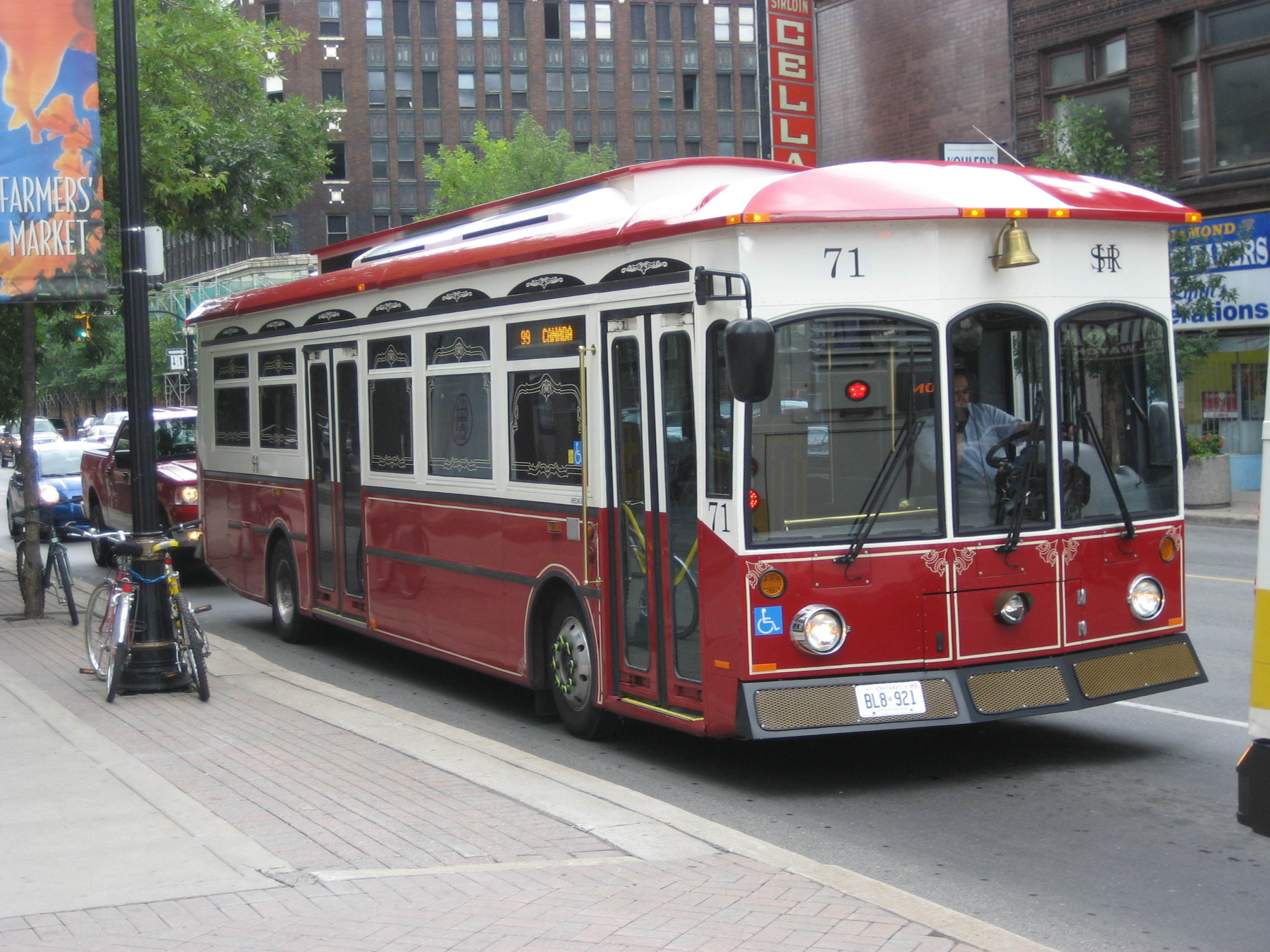
Route 99 - Waterfront Shuttle (seasonal)

The Great Lakes Expo7 is a 3-day annual springtime festival held at Bayfront Park and Pier 4 Park. The purpose of the festival is to improve people's knowledge of how everyone can improve and protect the fresh water within the Great Lakes. In 2007 the festival was held the last weekend of May.

== Waterfront shuttle ==
A waterfront shuttle is provided as a free service offered by the Hamilton Street Railway. It has a seasonal schedule that runs weekends from May-to-October connecting Hamilton's downtown core to the waterfront and attractions that can be found there like HMCS Haida and the Parks Canada Discovery Centre. The route circles Hamilton's downtown core around York Boulevard (north), Bay Street South (west), King Street West (south) and James Street North (east). Then it travels north along James Street and the Art District until it reaches the waterfront at Guise Street past the Leander Boat Club, Royal Hamilton Yacht Club, Hamilton Chamber of Commerce and the Harbour West Marina Complex. Then the route hangs a left on Discovery Drive, the site of the Parks Canada Discovery Centre. Also at this site is the Hamilton Harbour Queen (cruise boat), Hamiltonian (tour boat) and the Hamilton Waterfront Trolley.

== Hamilton Waterfront Trolley ==
The Hamilton Waterfront Trolley is a narrated tour along the 12 kilometre Hamilton Waterfront Trail. The main stop and departure spot is at the Hamilton Waterfront Scoops ice cream parlour. There are a dozen stops along the way between Princess Point at the western-end of the route to the eastern-end, the site of HMCS Haida. Also near this eastern-end route is the site of the Hamiltonian Tour Boat, which is a 12-passenger tour boat that offers a leisurely guided tour of Hamilton Harbour.

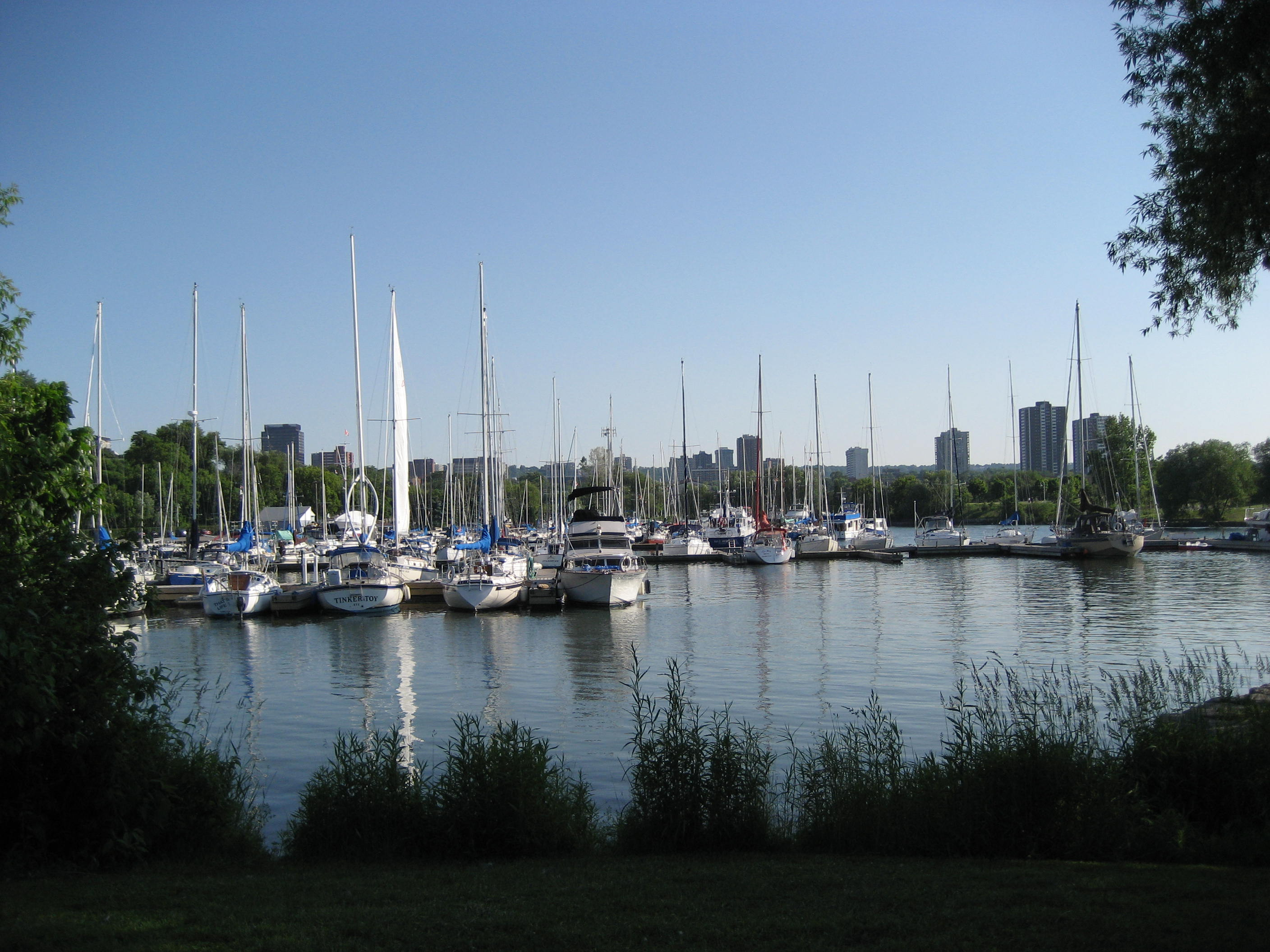
Bayfront Park

== Images ==
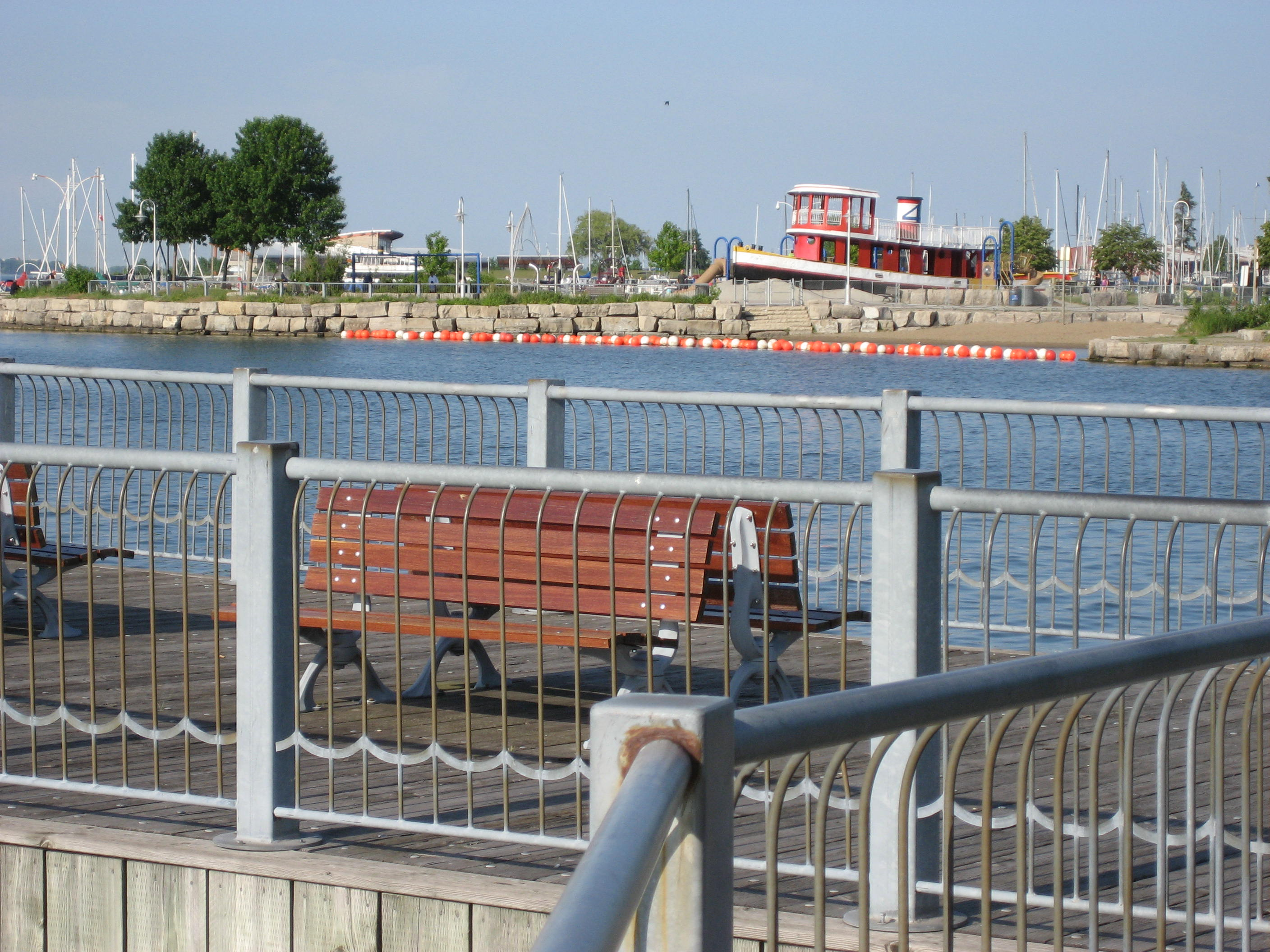
Pier 4 Park, Boardwalk

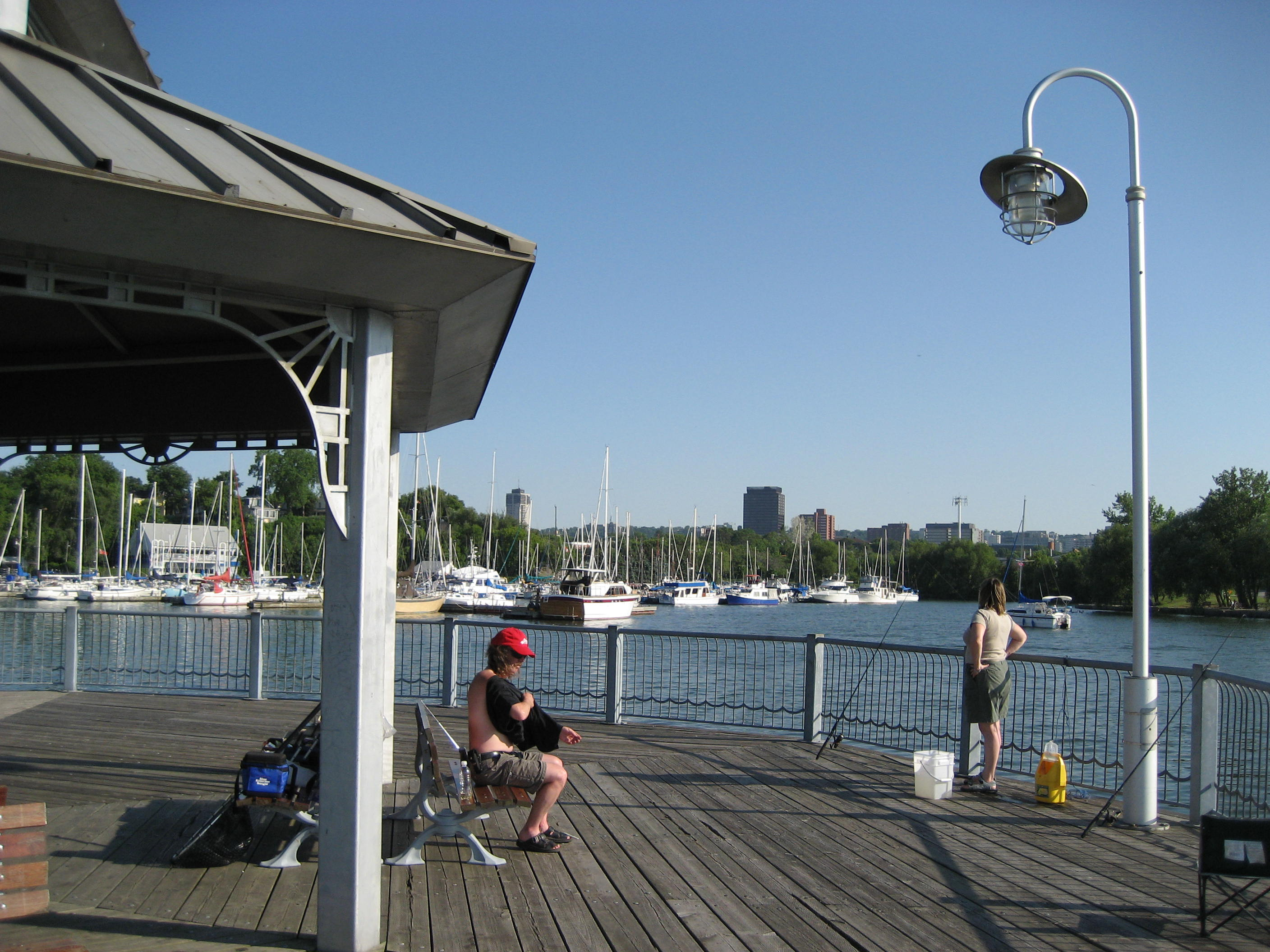
Pier 4 Park, Boardwalk

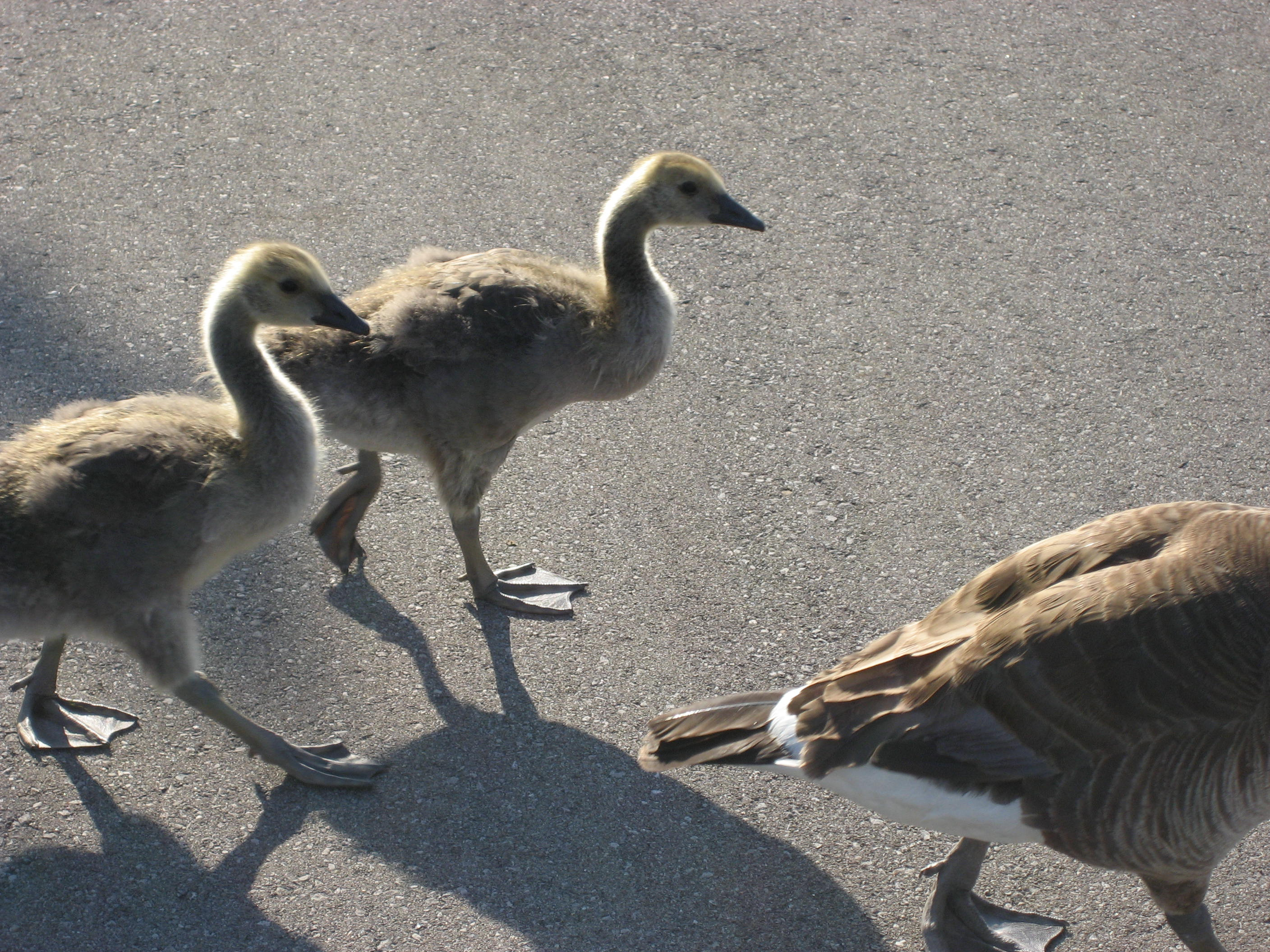
Canada Geese, Pier 4 Park

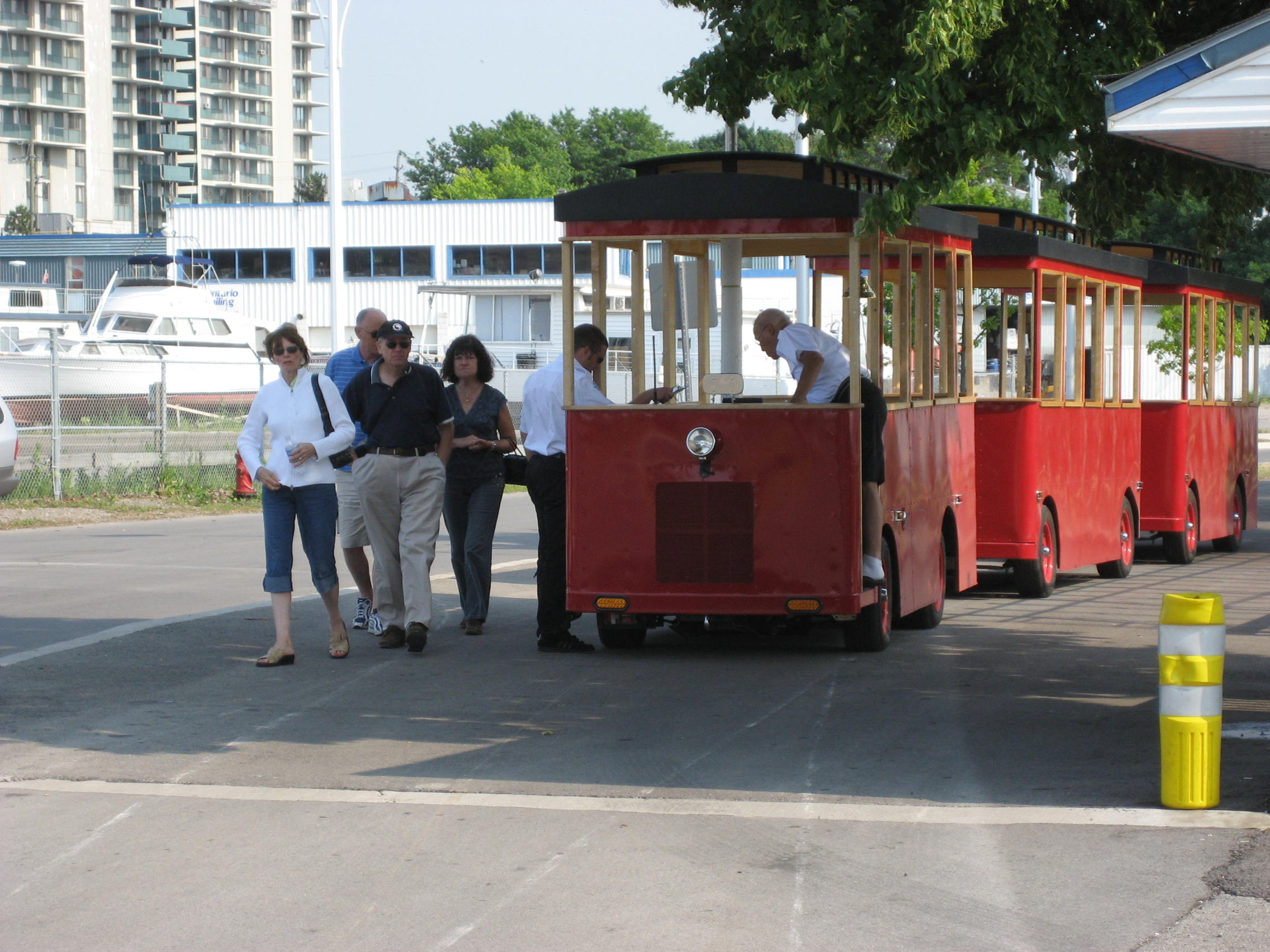
Waterfront trolley

== See also ==
- List of roads in Hamilton, Ontario
- Bruce Trail
- Hamilton Conservation Authority
- Niagara Escarpment Commission
