= ConBravo! =

Fan convention in Hamilton, Ontario, Canada

- ConBravo! Logo
- Status: Inactive
- Genre: Anime, Gaming, New Media
- Date: July 26–28, 2019
- Venue: Hamilton Convention Centre, Sheraton Hamilton
- Location: Hamilton, Ontario
- Country: Canada
- Inaugurated: July 3–4, 2010
- Attendance: 5032 (2017)
- Organizer: TeamBravo! Inc.
- Website: ConBravo!

ConBravo! was an annual fan-run anime, gaming, and new media convention held during July in Hamilton, Ontario, Canada, started in 2010. The convention was created as a multi-genre event which gave it much of its framework, but then began to tout its specialization in the aforementioned areas.

It was notable for the special attention it paid to online personalities, including the first Canadian speaking appearances of Doug Walker, Noah Antwiler, Angry Joe, Nathan Barnatt, and James Rolfe in 2011 and 2012. Further, its 2012 show was the first time Rolfe and Walker had appeared at a convention together, revisiting an online rivalry which saw a boom in popularity for the latter.

== Founding and Current Status ==
The first edition of the convention ran on July 3-4 at the Holiday Inn on Argus Rd in Oakville, Ontario. From there it moved to the Burlington Holiday Inn for 2011 and 2012, before finally finding a long-term venue at the Hamilton Convention Centre in Hamilton, Ontario. The last ConBravo! ran in 2019 and went on hiatus with the COVID-19 lockdown. It has not appeared since and appears to be fully inactive.

== Gallery ==
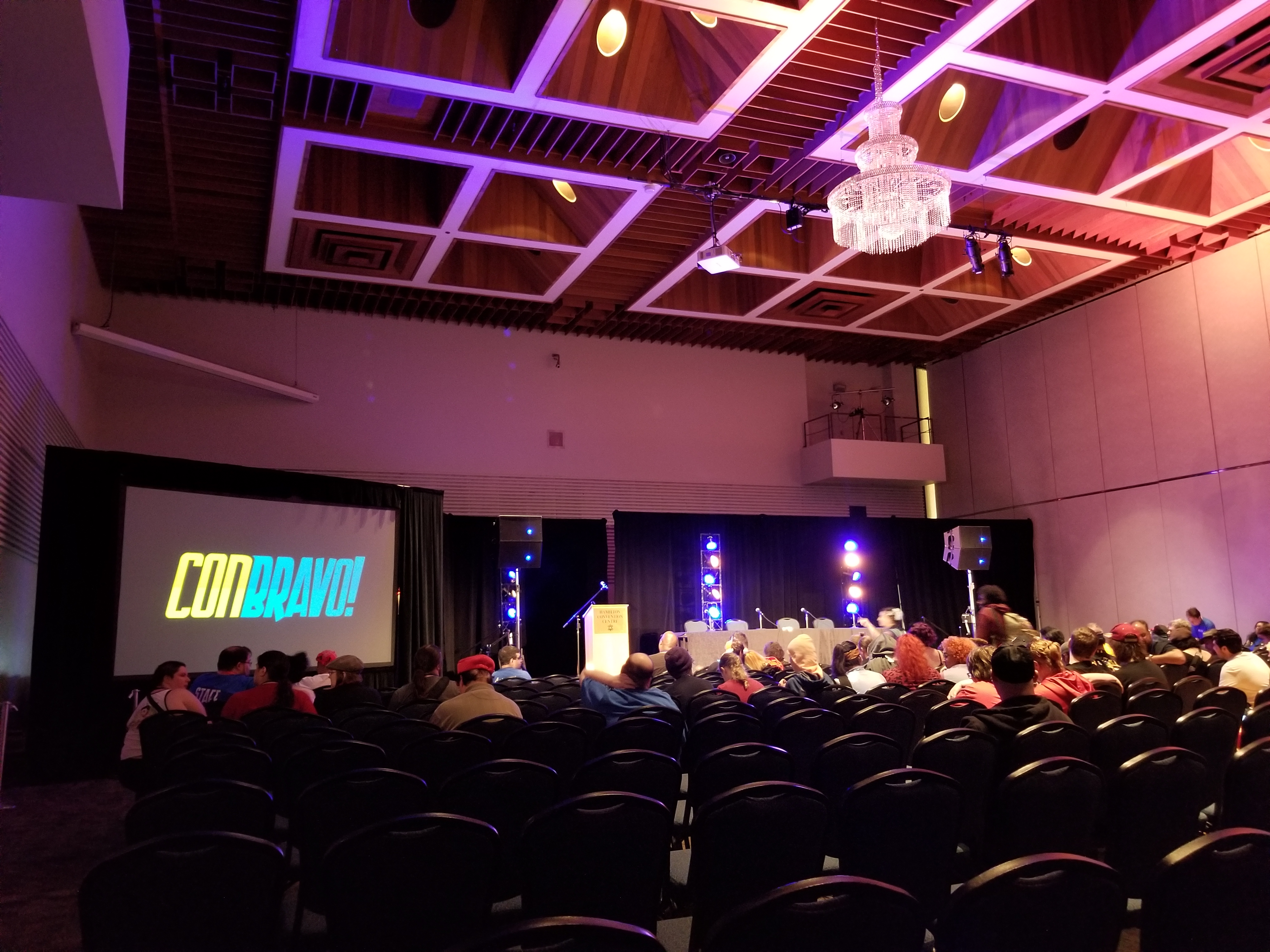
ConBravo 2019 closing ceremonies

== See also ==
- List of comic book conventions
- List of anime conventions
