= Hamilton Convention Centre =

Convention, exhibition and event facility in Hamilton, Ontario, Canada

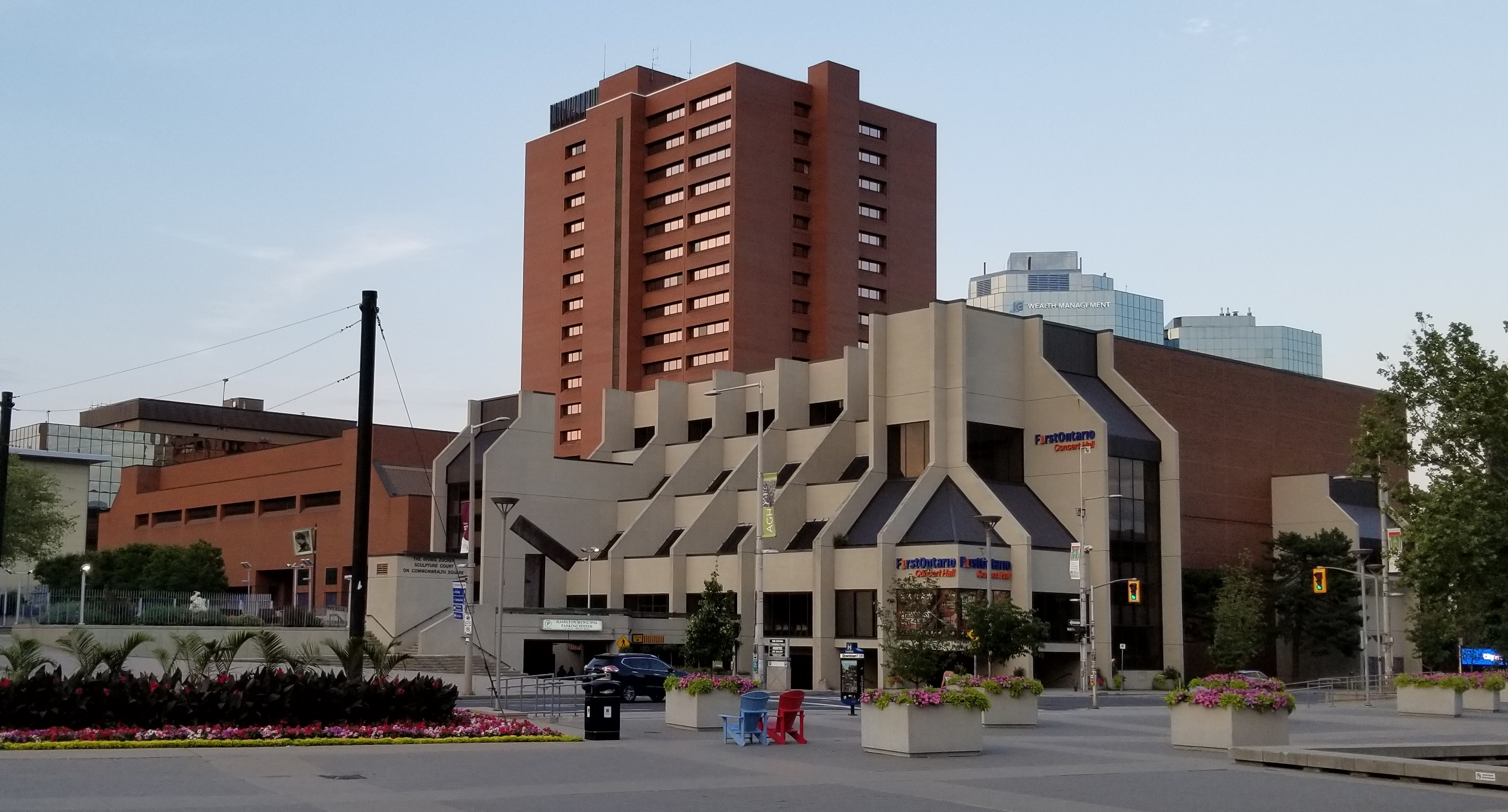
- Hamilton Convention Centre, Ellen Fairclough Building, and FirstOntario Concert Hall
- Interactive map of Hamilton Convention Centre
- Address: 1 Summers Lane; Hamilton, Ontario; L8P 4Y2
- Coordinates: 43.25692°N 79.87129°W
- Owner: City of Hamilton
- Operator: Carmen's Group

Construction
- Built: 1981; 45 years ago
- Opened: June 19, 1981; 44 years ago
- Renovated: 2013; 13 years ago

Website
- hccevents.ca

The Hamilton Convention Centre is a full service convention, exhibition, and event facility located in downtown Hamilton, Ontario, Canada. The convention centre was designed by local architect Trevor P. Garwood-Jones and was constructed in 1981 along with the connected Ellen Fairclough Building as part of a large urban renewal project that was occurring in the Hamilton downtown core at the time.

In 2013, Carmen's Group acquired the rights to operate the Hamilton Convention Centre, and the facility underwent over $1 million in renovations.

The Hamilton Convention Centre is in the Ellen Fairclough Building, which at 94 m (308 ft) tall, is currently the 5th tallest building in Hamilton, Ontario, and is directly connected to FirstOntario Concert Hall, the Art Gallery of Hamilton, Lloyd D. Jackson Square, and the Sheraton Hamilton Hotel.

== Description ==
=== Level 1 ===
The first floor of the Hamilton Convention Centre features the Wentworth Room, a 20,000 sq ft (1,900 m^{2}) exhibition space with removable divider walls allowing for 3 separate exhibition spaces, each with their own entrance. The Wentworth Concourse runs the entire length of the Wentworth room, and features a direct connection to FirstOntario Concert Hall. The Hamilton Convention Centre Décor Gallery is also located on this level. The Convention Centre's loading dock is located on this level, and features a drive-through door and a ramp leading to the Wentworth Room, as well as a large freight elevator capable of transporting vehicles to the second and third levels. The loading dock is shared with the Ellen Fairclough Building and FirstOntario Concert Hall The Ellen Fairclough Building has a separate lobby located along King Street West.

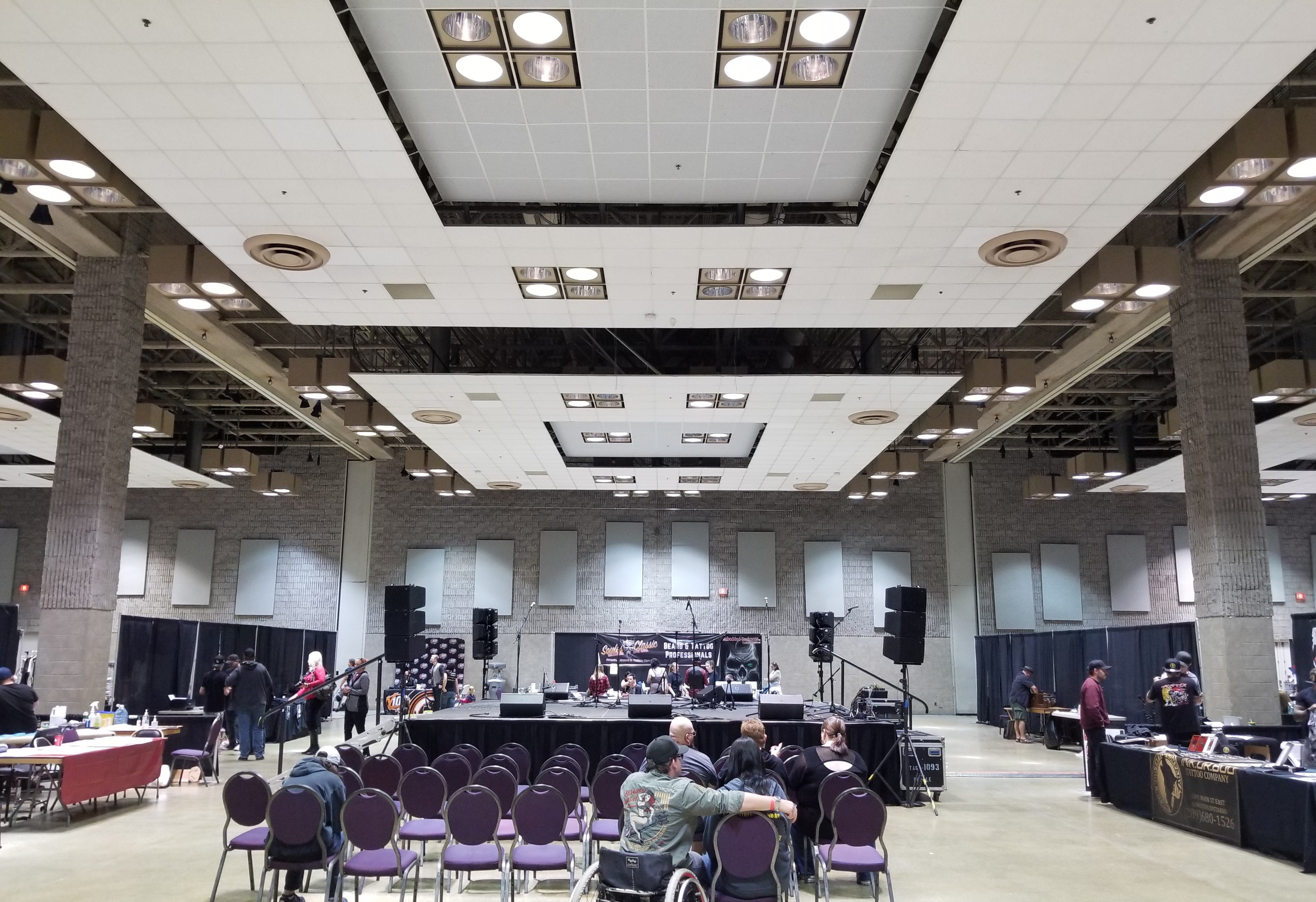
Wentworth Room

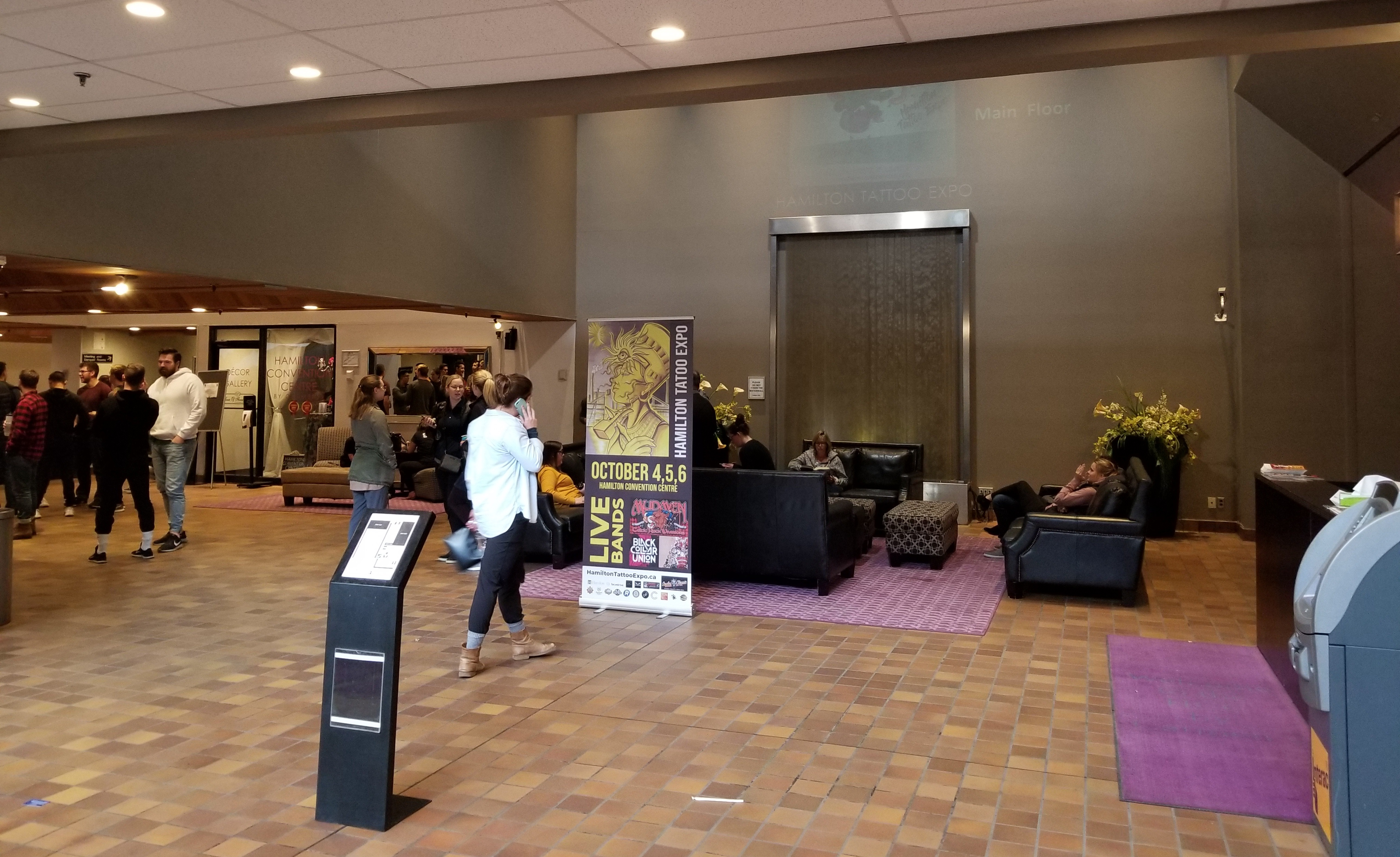
Wentworth Concourse viewed from the main entrance. The Wentworth Room is to the left, and the entrance to FirstOntario Concert Hall is to the right

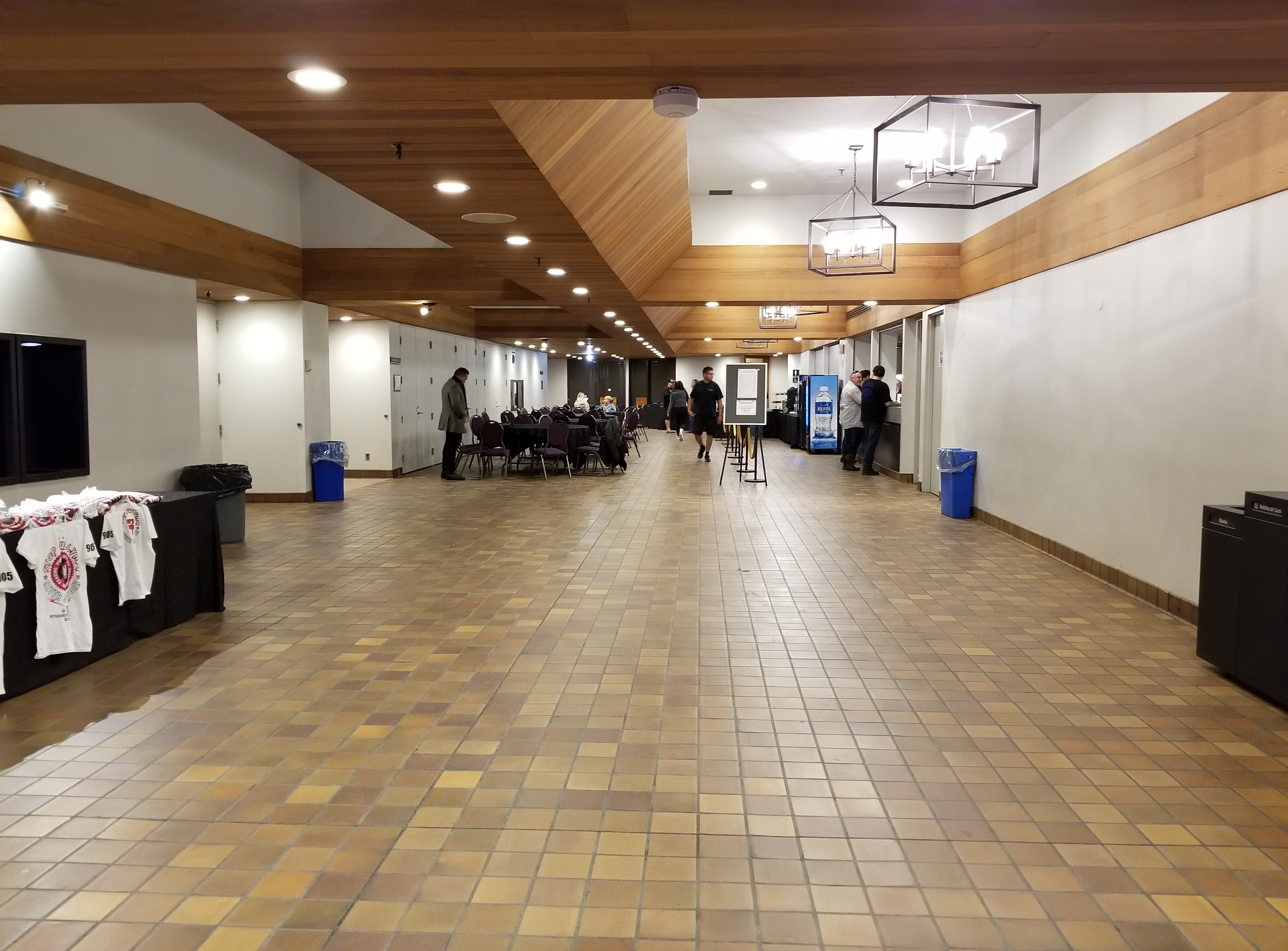
Wentworth Concourse. The entrances to the Wentworth Room are on the left

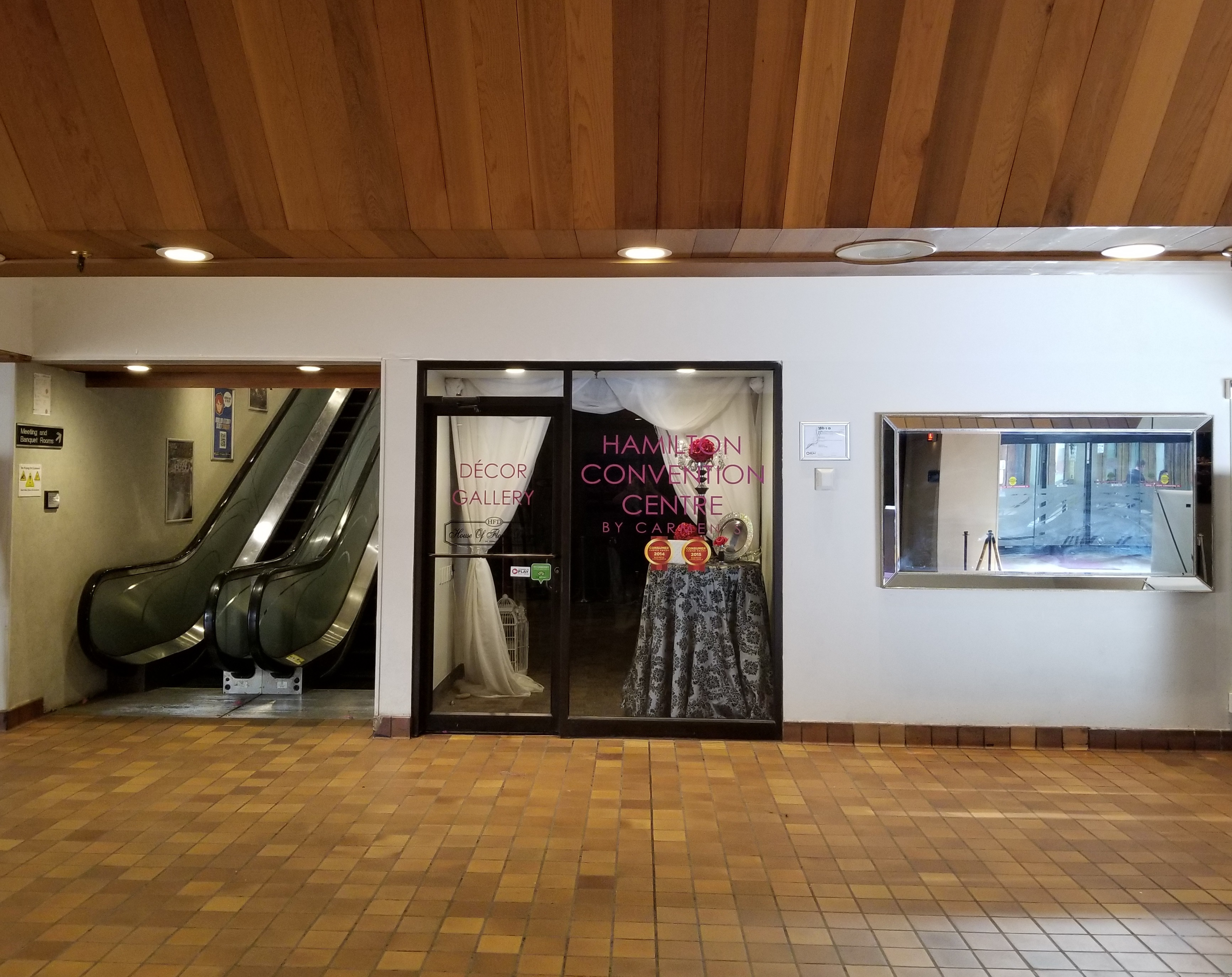
Décor Gallery and escalators

=== Level 2 ===
The second floor of the Hamilton Convention Centre features the Albion Room, a 4,000 sq ft (400 m^{2}) ballroom with removable divider walls allowing for 3 separate rooms, each with their own entrance. The second floor also features 8 meeting rooms, one of which overlooks the Wentworth Room via a window. This floor also features a large outdoor public plaza and sculpture court known as Commonwealth Square, which is located above Summers Lane, and is shared with the Art Gallery of Hamilton and FirstOntario Concert Hall. Connections with the Sheraton Hamilton Hotel and the Lloyd D. Jackson Square mall are on this level, being accessible via an enclosed pedestrian bridge.

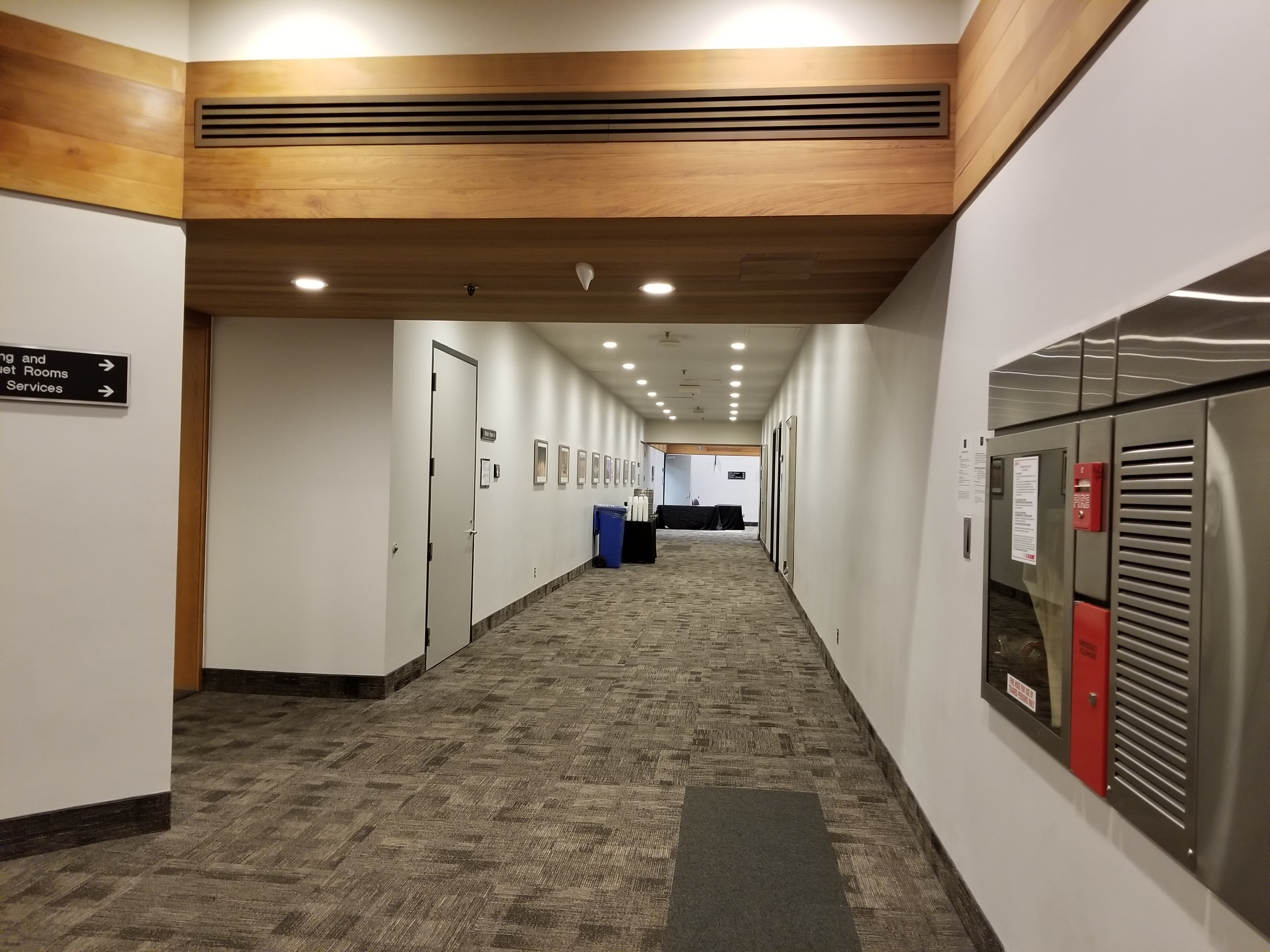
Second floor corridor. The entrances to the Albion Room are on the left

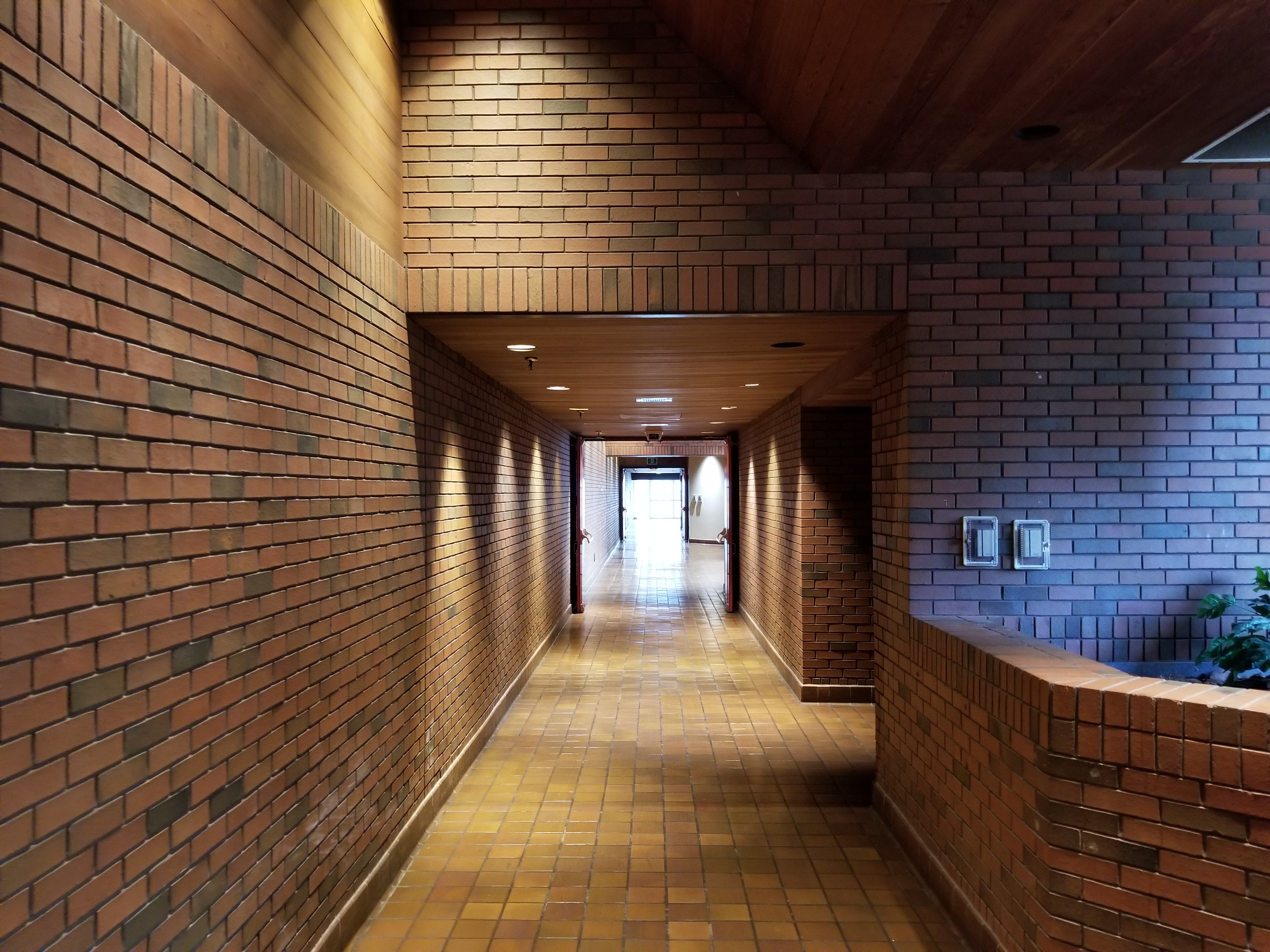
Path from the Hamilton Convention Centre to the pedestrian bridge. Several décor displays are located along this path

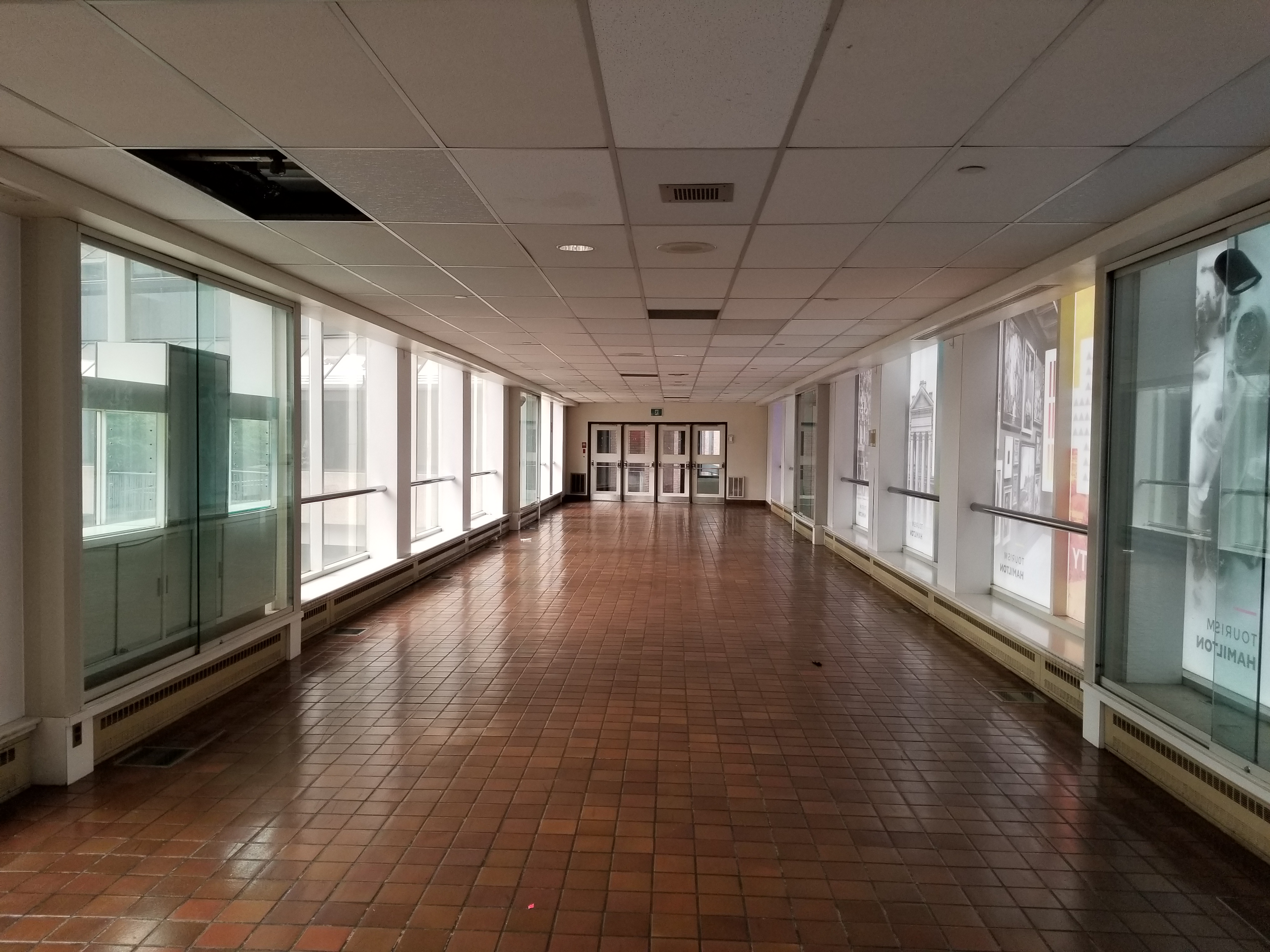
Pedestrian bridge connecting the Hamilton Convention Centre with the Sheraton Hamilton Hotel and Lloyd D. Jackson Square

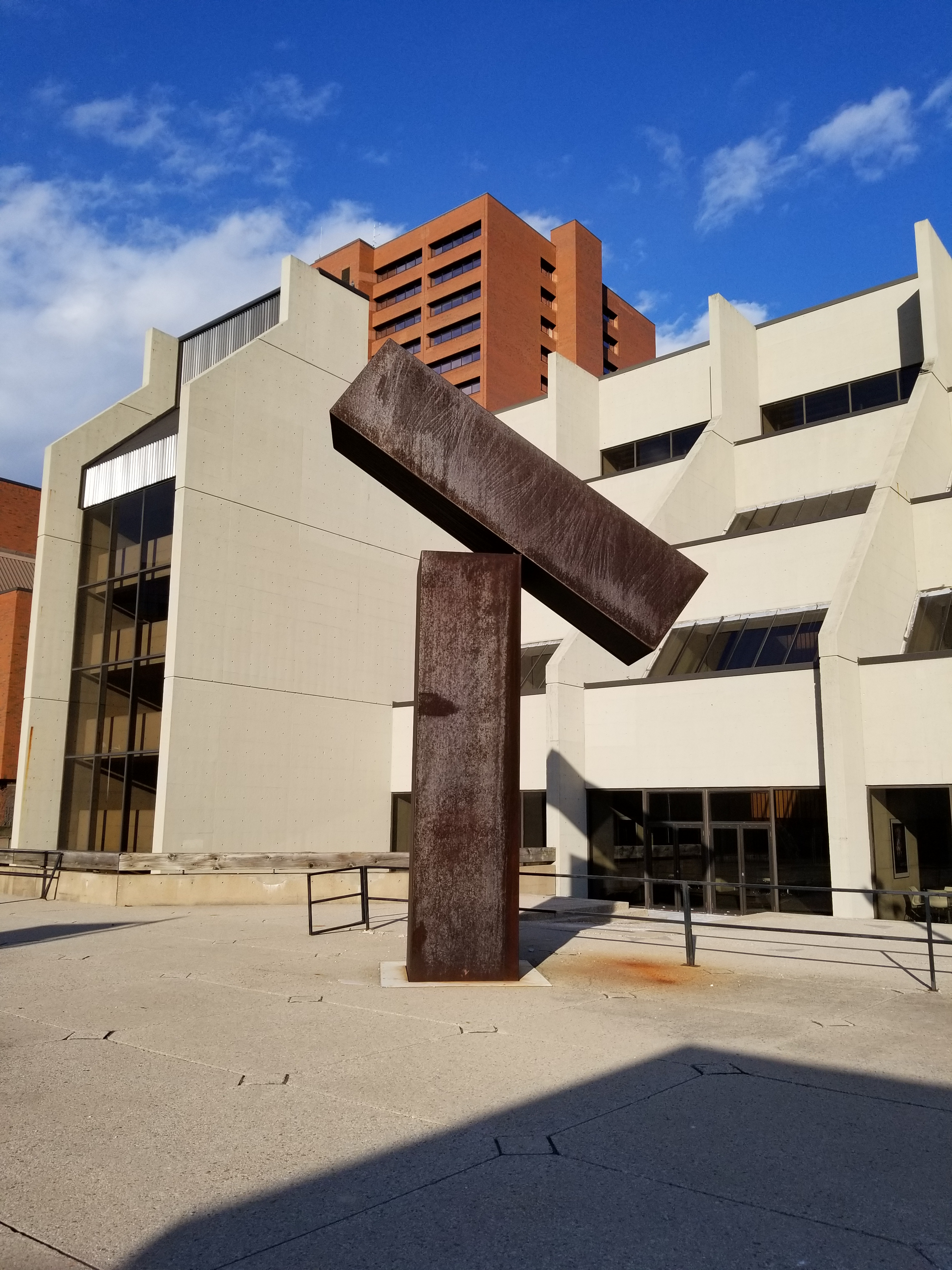
"Canadac", a Stelcoloy sculpture by Kosso Eloul located at Commonwealth Square

=== Level 3 ===
The third floor of the Hamilton Convention Centre features the Chedoke and Webster Rooms. The Chedoke Ballroom is the larger of the two, with up to 20,000 sq ft (1,900 m^{2}) of floor space, while the smaller Webster ballroom offers up to 4,620 sq ft (400 m^{2}) of floor space. With the use of removable divider walls, the Chedoke Ballroom can be divided into a total of 5 separate rooms. However, the maximum configuration allowing for individual entrances to the Chedoke Ballrooms is 3 separate rooms. The Webster room can also be divided into 3 separate rooms with individual entrances. The Webster Lounge features a private bar that overlooks the intersection of King Street and MacNab Street. The third floor also features an outdoor patio known as the Webster Terrace, as well as a large meeting room. All floors above this level are considered part of the Ellen Fairclough Building, and are used to house various government offices.

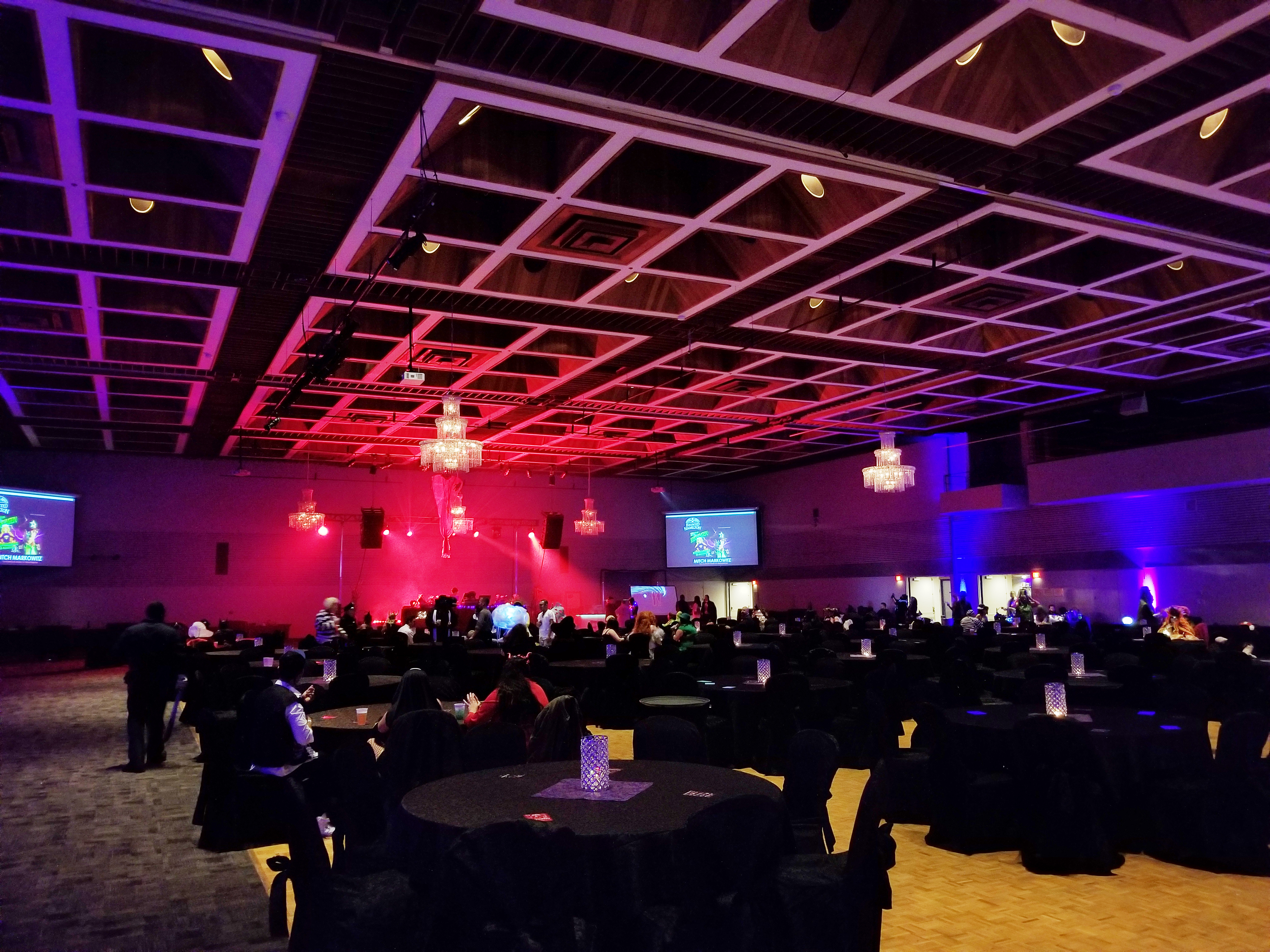
Chedoke Ballroom

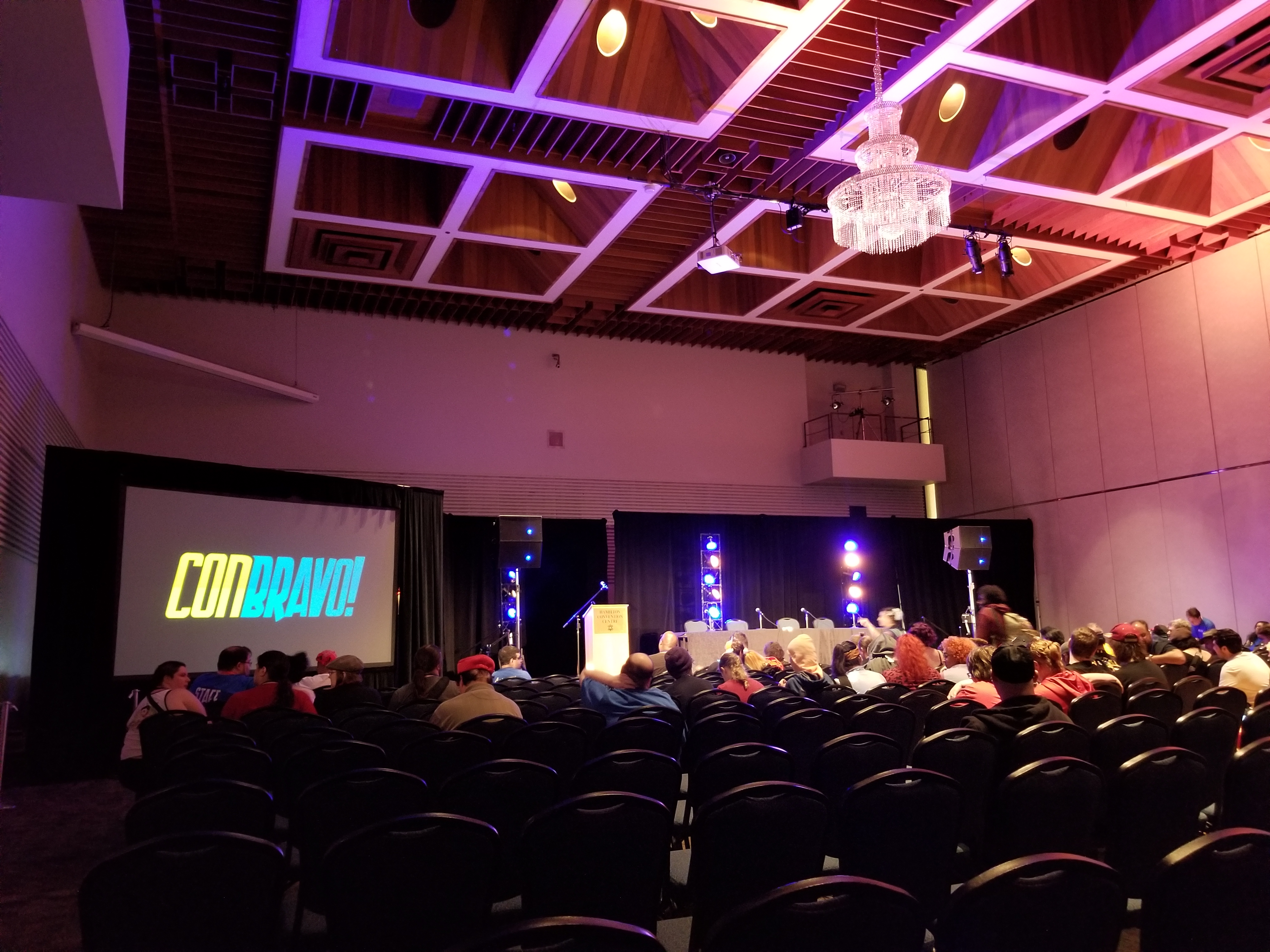
Chedoke Ballroom C during the ConBravo! 2019 closing ceremonies

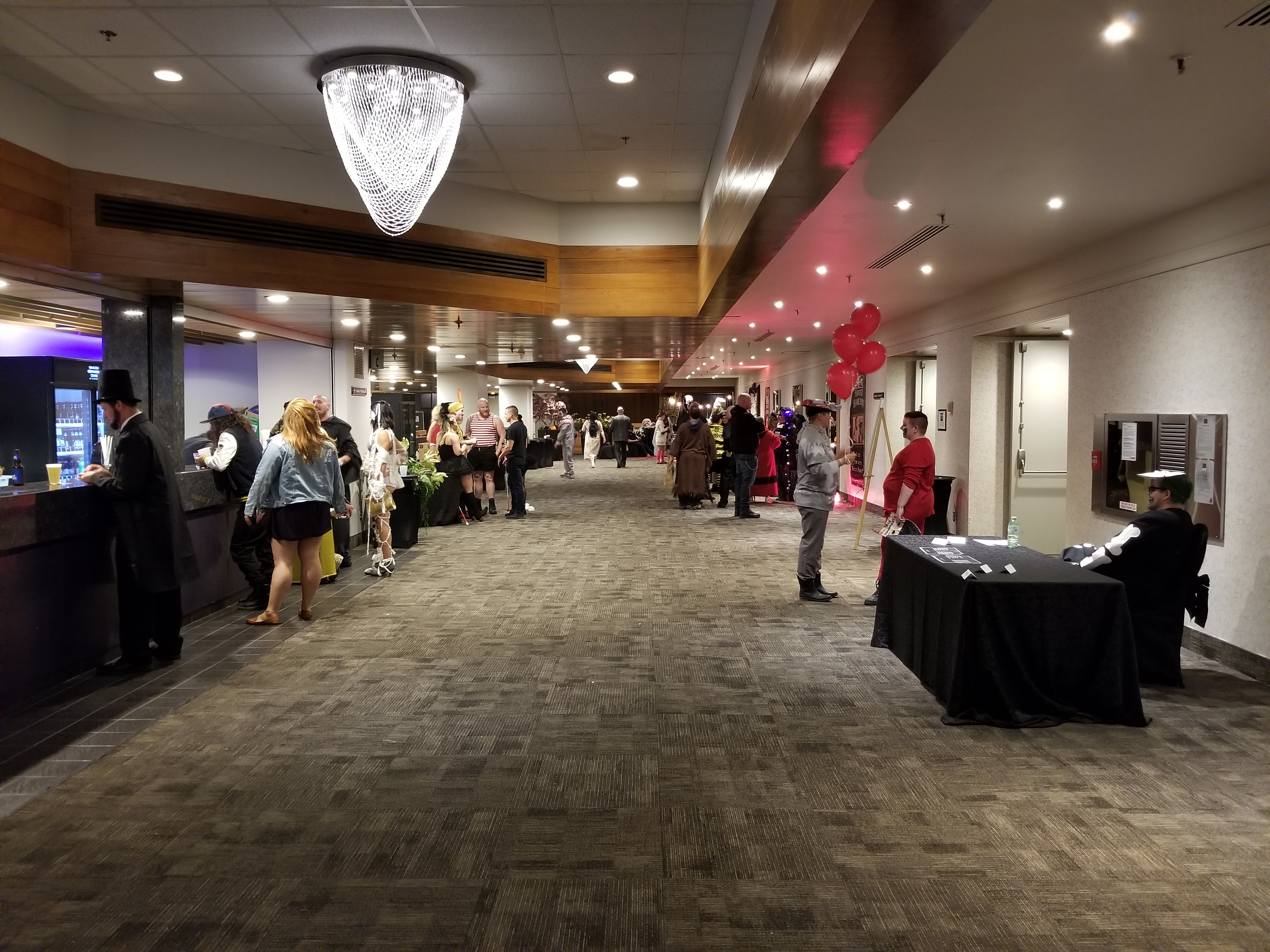
Chedoke Foyer. The entrances to the Chedoke Ballroom are on the right

== See also ==
- Ellen Fairclough Building
- FirstOntario Concert Hall
- Art Gallery of Hamilton
- TD Coliseum
- Sheraton Hamilton
- Lloyd D. Jackson Square
- List of tallest buildings in Hamilton, Ontario
