= Sheraton Hamilton =

19-storey, 76 metres (249 ft), 299 room hotel in downtown Hamilton, Ontario

Sheraton Hamilton Hotel
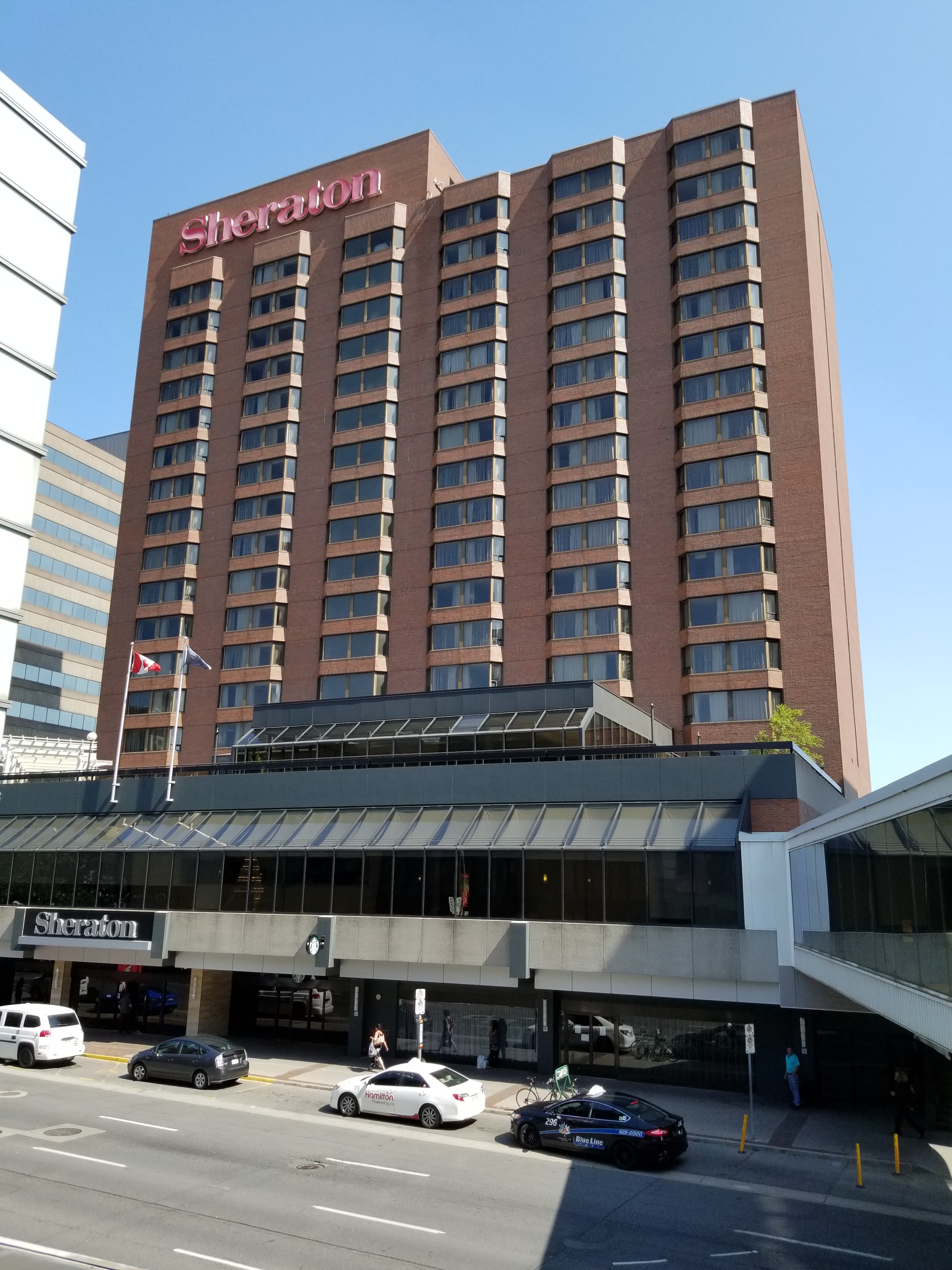
- Interactive map of the Sheraton Hamilton Hotel area

General information
- Type: Hotel/retail
- Location: 116 King Street West; Hamilton, Ontario; L8P 4V3
- Coordinates: 43°15′28″N 79°52′20″W
- Completed: 1985; 41 years ago

Height
- Roof: 76 m (249 ft)

Technical details
- Floor count: 19
- Lifts/elevators: 5

The Sheraton Hamilton Hotel, opened on August 15, 1985, is a 19-storey, 76 metres (249 ft), 299 room hotel in downtown Hamilton, Ontario, Canada. Situated on King Street West, East of Bay Street North, the hotel is part of the Lloyd D. Jackson Square complex.

The hotel has 1,200 square metres (13,000 sq. feet) of meeting space, and direct connections to TD Coliseum, the Hamilton Convention Centre/Ellen Fairclough Building and Lloyd D. Jackson Square.

In September 2008, the hotel underwent about $10 million in renovations, and changed ownership to local developer Darko Vranich and his Burlington-based company, Vrancor Group.

== Peregrine Falcon Conservation at Sheraton Hamilton Hotel ==
In 2024, the Sheraton Hamilton Hotel became the nesting site for peregrine falcons, a species previously at risk. Early in the year, a pair of falcons named McKeever and Judson, who have been residents since early 2022, were observed with new eggs. The Hamilton Community Peregrine Project noted the arrival of the first egg in March, which set a record for the earliest sighting of a peregrine falcon egg at this location.

As of late April 2024, the falcons successfully hatched four chicks, contributing to the ongoing recovery of the peregrine falcon population. This event marks another successful year for the project, which has been monitoring and supporting falcon populations from the 18th-floor ledge of the hotel for nearly three decades.

== Images ==
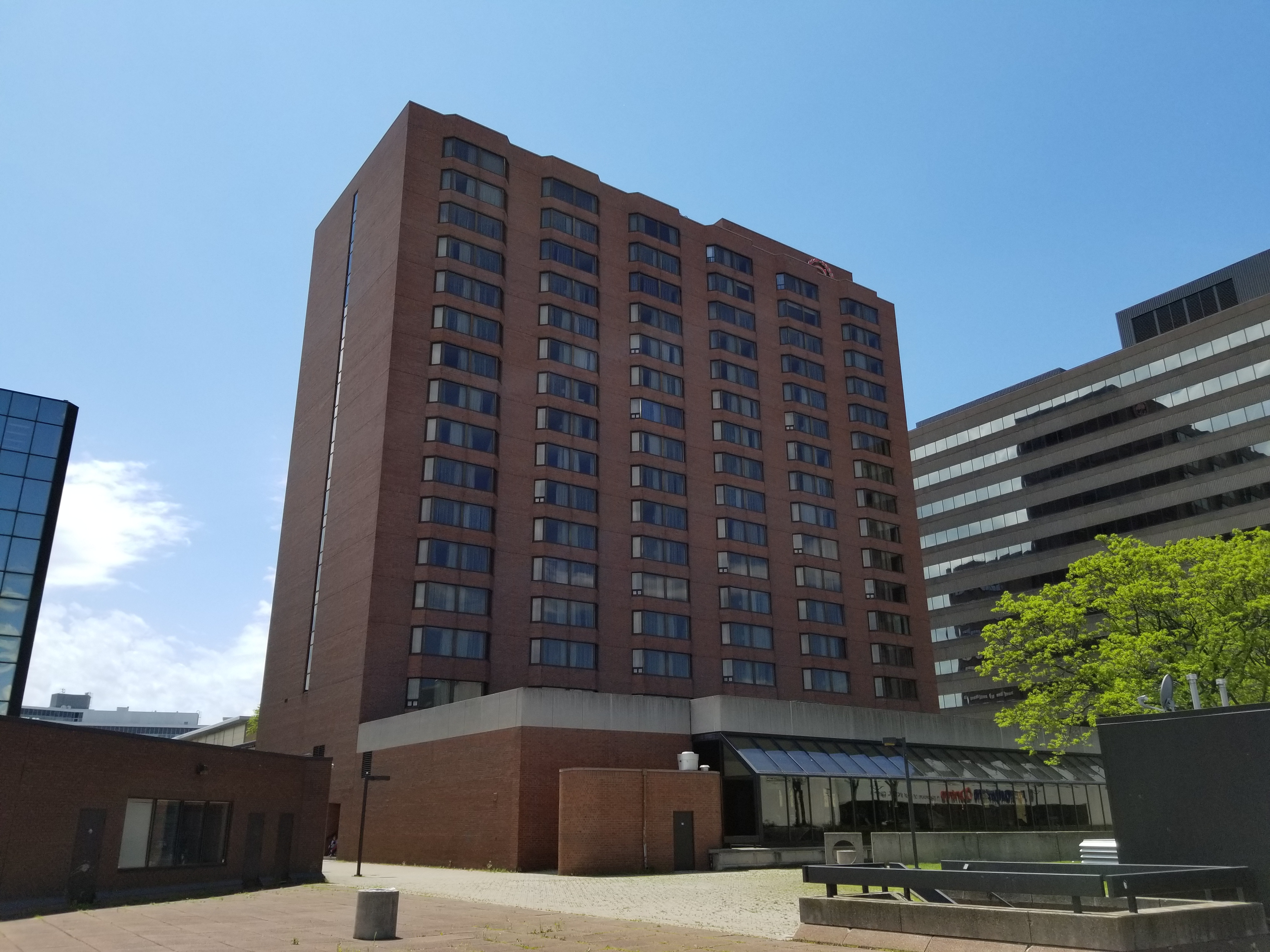
Sheraton Hamilton viewed from the Jackson Square rooftop plaza

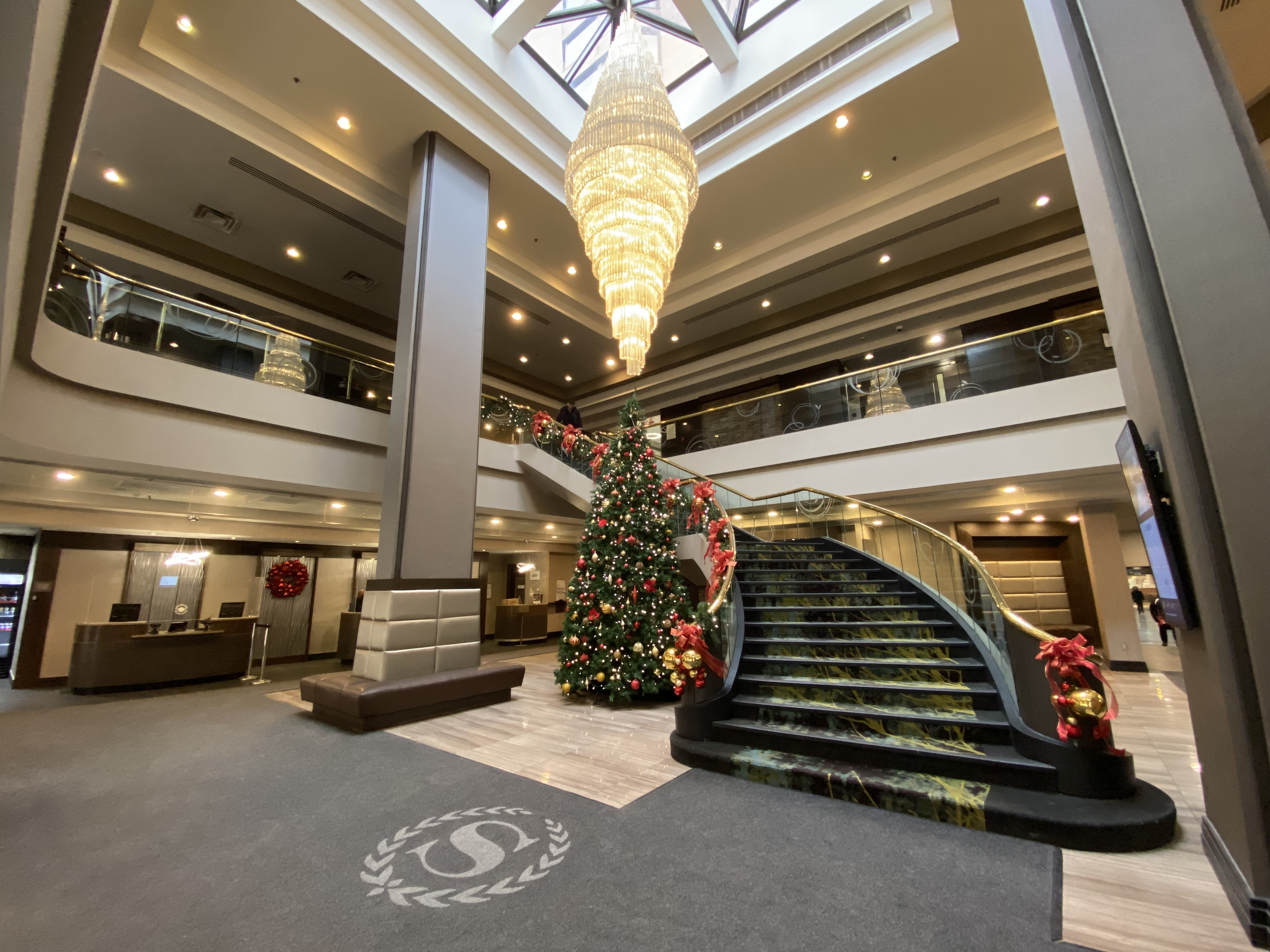
Sheraton Hamilton lobby

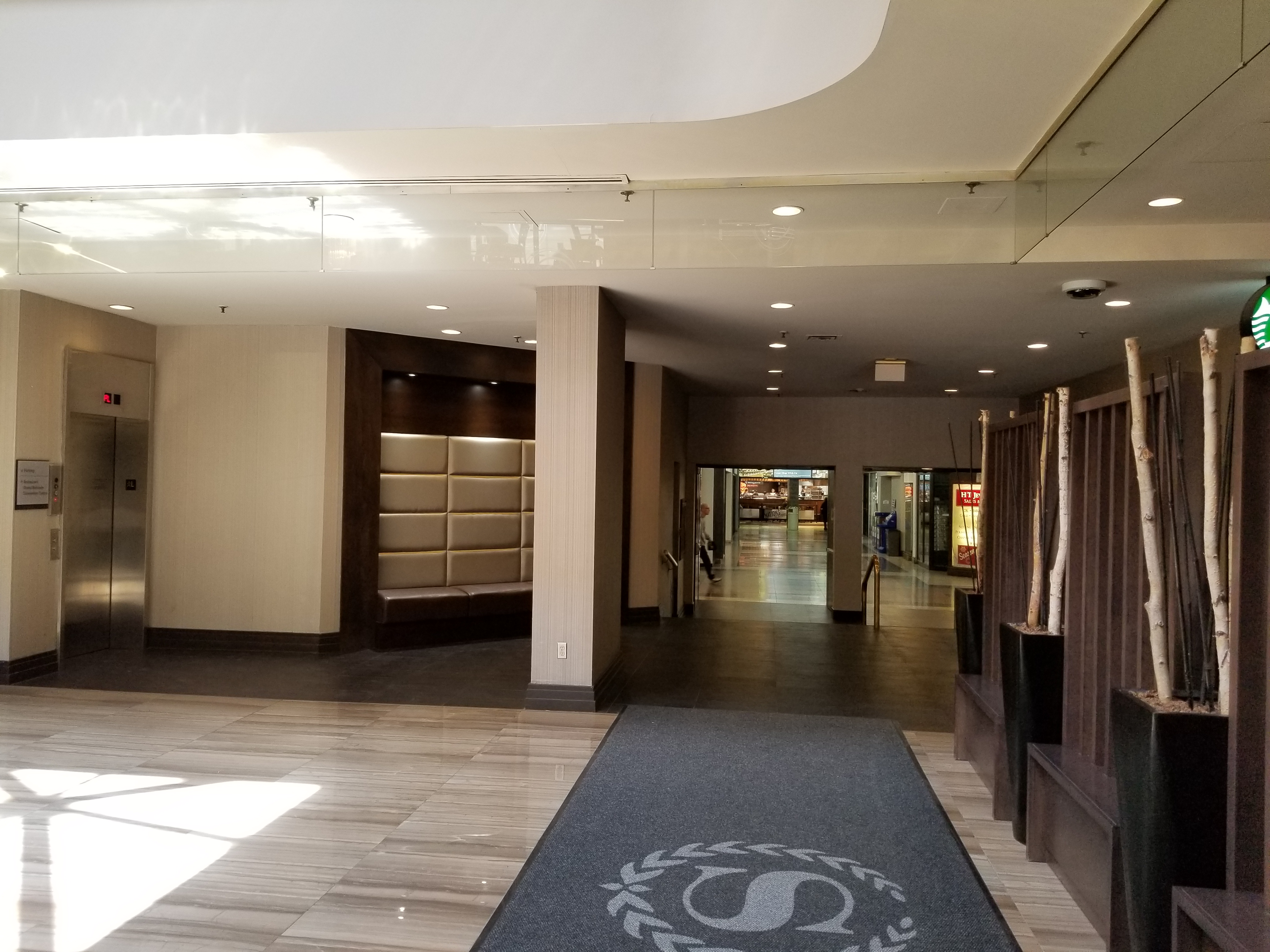
Sheraton Hamilton lobby, parking elevator, and exit into Jackson Square mall

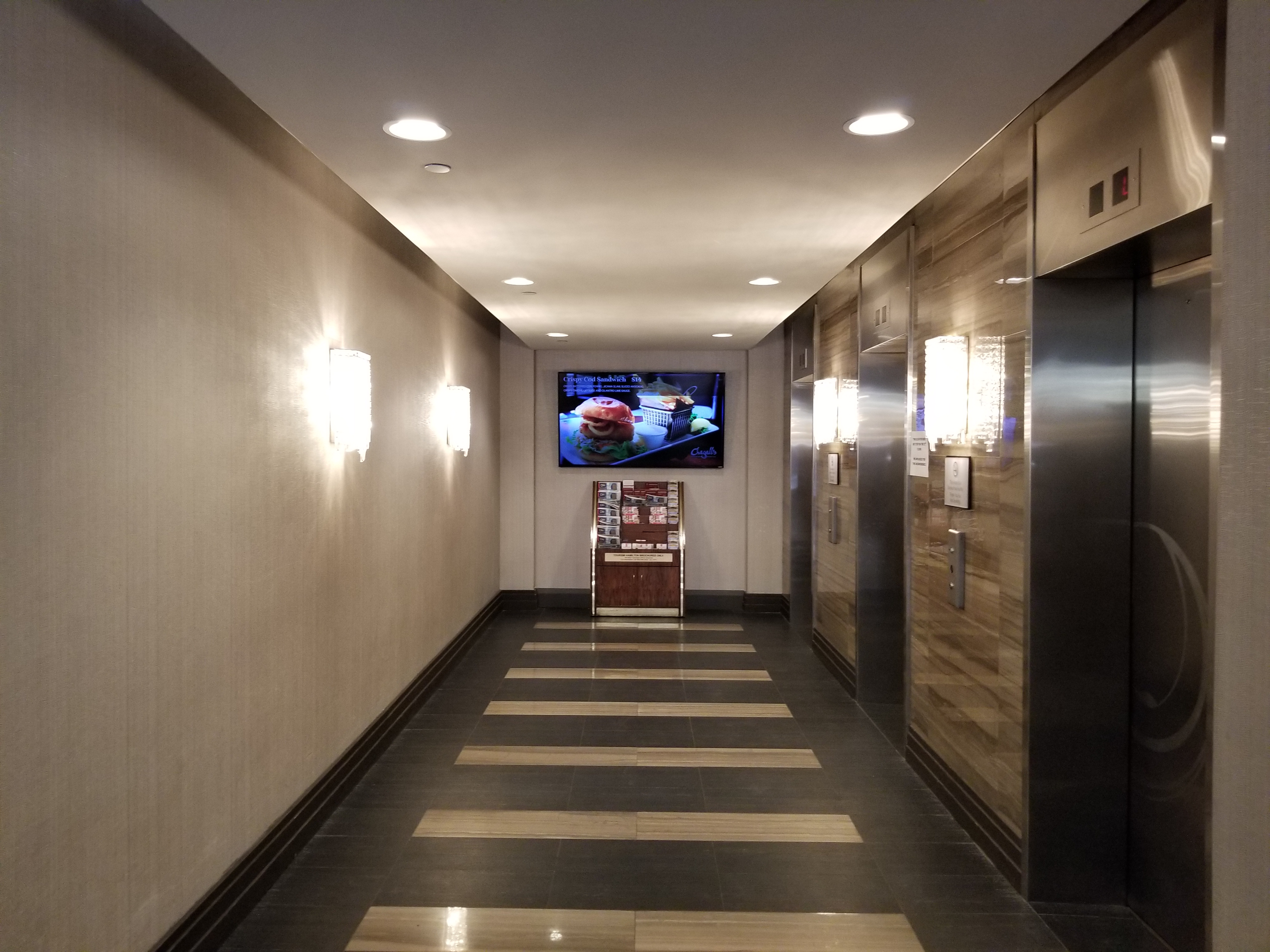
Sheraton Hamilton main elevator bank

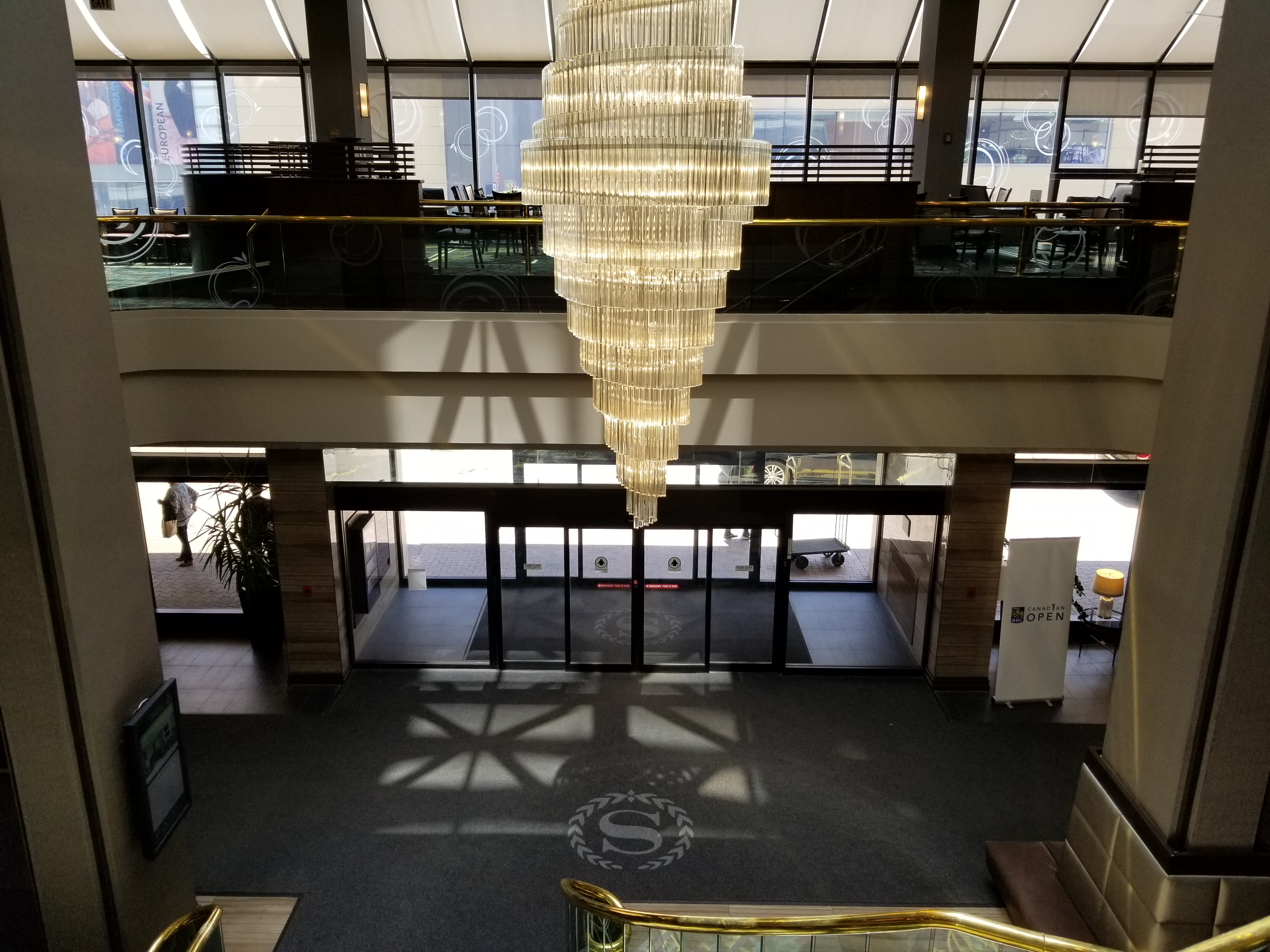
Sheraton Hamilton King Street entrance, lobby, and plaza level

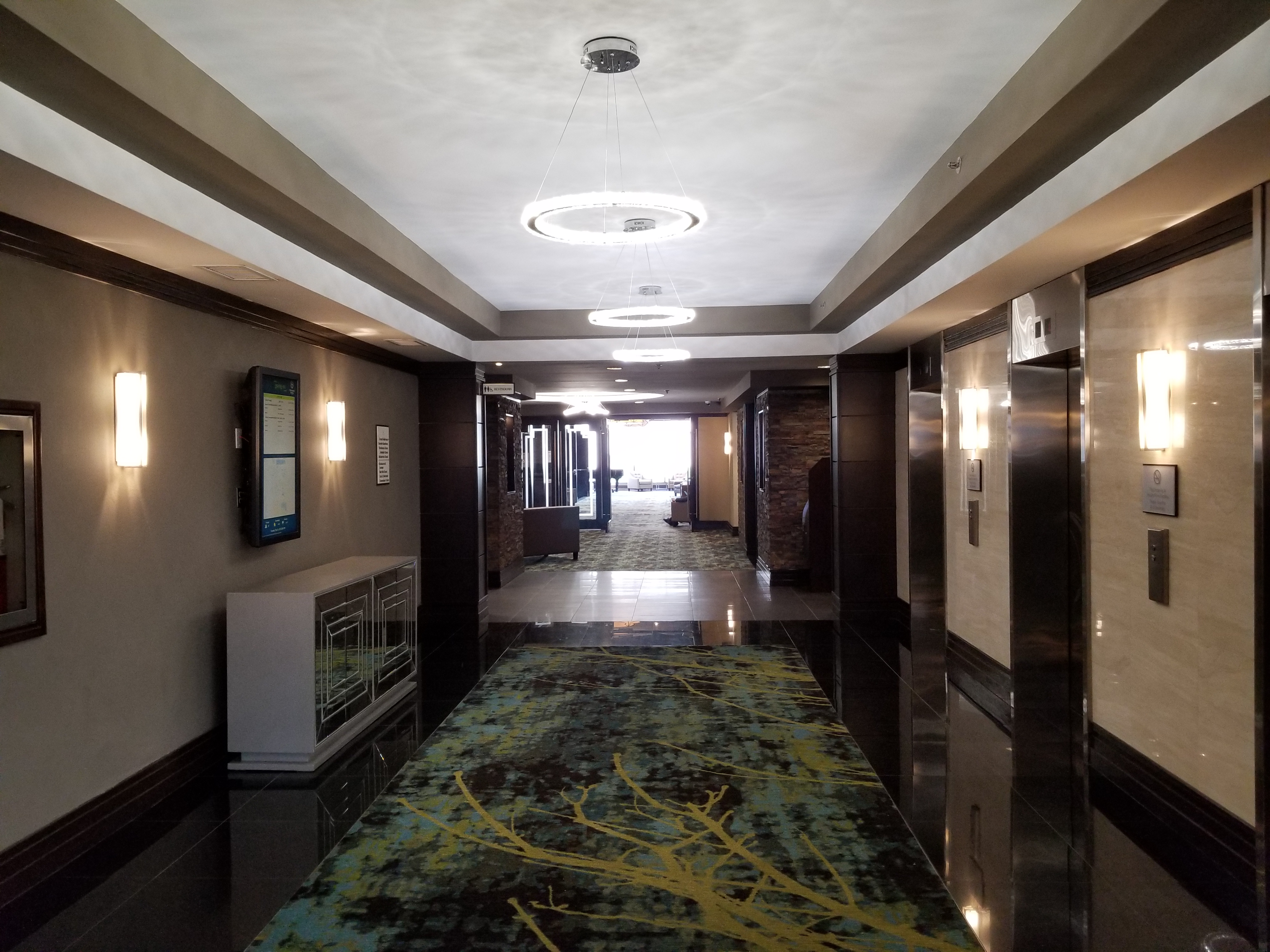
Sheraton Hamilton plaza level and elevator bank

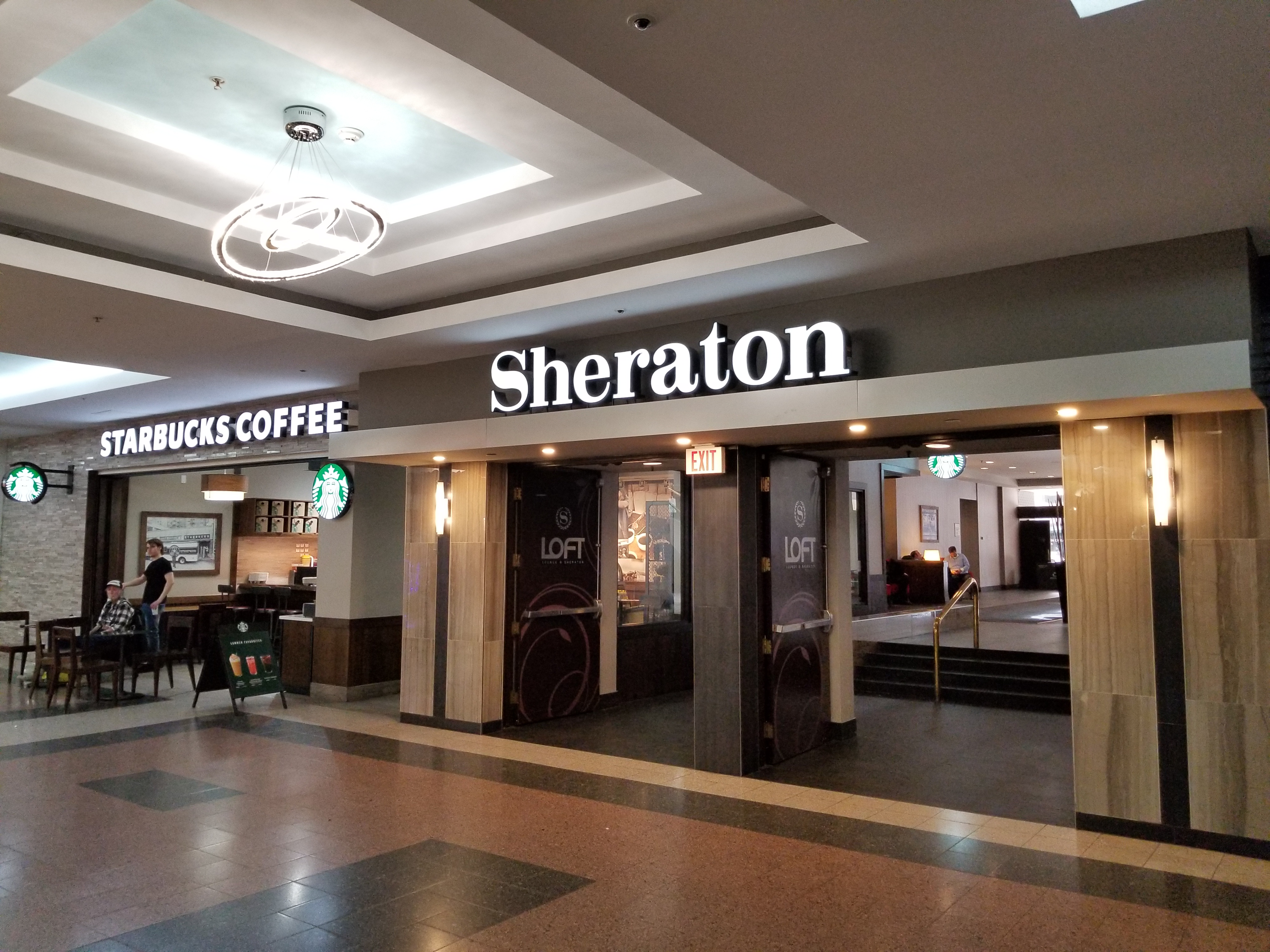
Sheraton Hamilton Jackson Square entrance

== See also ==
- Lloyd D. Jackson Square
- Hamilton Convention Centre
- List of tallest buildings in Hamilton, Ontario
