= Ellen Fairclough Building =

18-storey high-rise building built in 1981 5th tallest building in Hamilton, Ontario

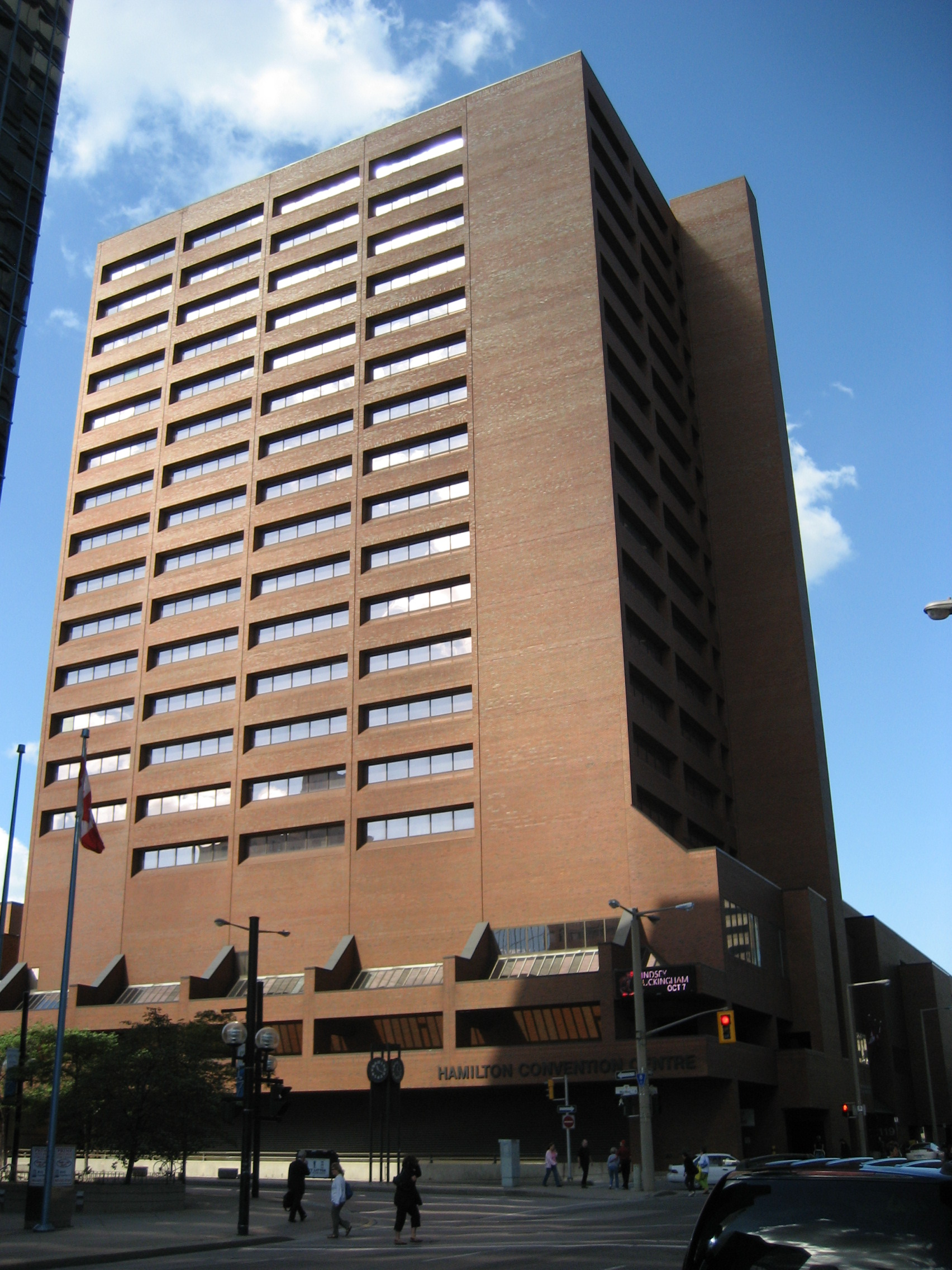
- Interactive map of the Ellen Fairclough Building area

General information
- Type: Office
- Location: Hamilton, Ontario, Canada
- Coordinates: 43.25692°N 79.87129°W
- Completed: 1981; 45 years ago

Height
- Roof: 94 m (308 ft)

Technical details
- Floor count: 20
- Lifts/elevators: 5

Design and construction
- Architect: Trevor P. Garwood-Jones

Ellen Fairclough Building (French: Édifice Ellen-Fairclough) is an 18-storey (94 m) high-rise office building built in 1981. It is the 5th tallest building in Hamilton, Ontario, Canada. It is situated on the corner of King Street West and MacNab Street South, and is primarily used to house provincial government offices.

The building was first known as the Convention Centre when it first opened up in 1981. One year later in 1982, it was renamed the Ellen Fairclough Building. Ellen Fairclough was a Hamiltonian and the first female member of the Canadian Cabinet. Ellen Fairclough served under John Diefenbaker for 13 years in Parliament. She advocated for gender equality and fairer immigration policy. She died at 99 in 2004.

The Hamilton Convention Centre occupies the first 3 floors of this office tower (with the exception of the Ellen Fairclough Building's lobby and the shared loading dock, both located on the ground floor), and it is attached to the Art Gallery of Hamilton and FirstOntario Concert Hall. There is also an enclosed pedestrian bridge that crosses over King Street and attaches to the Lloyd D. Jackson Square mall and the Sheraton Hamilton hotel. The government building is also home to a courthouse and a citizenship & immigration office.

== Images ==
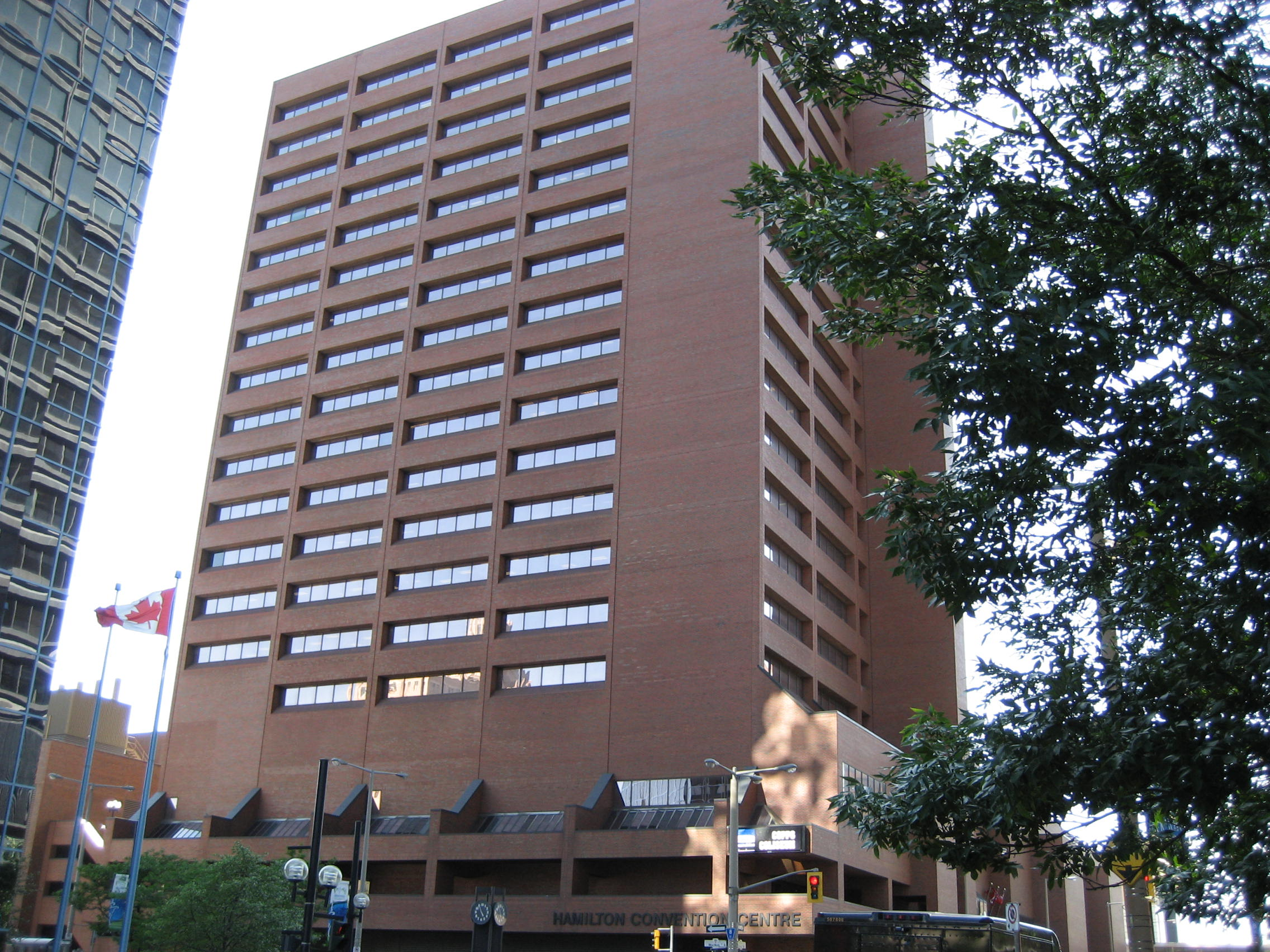
View from King Street West

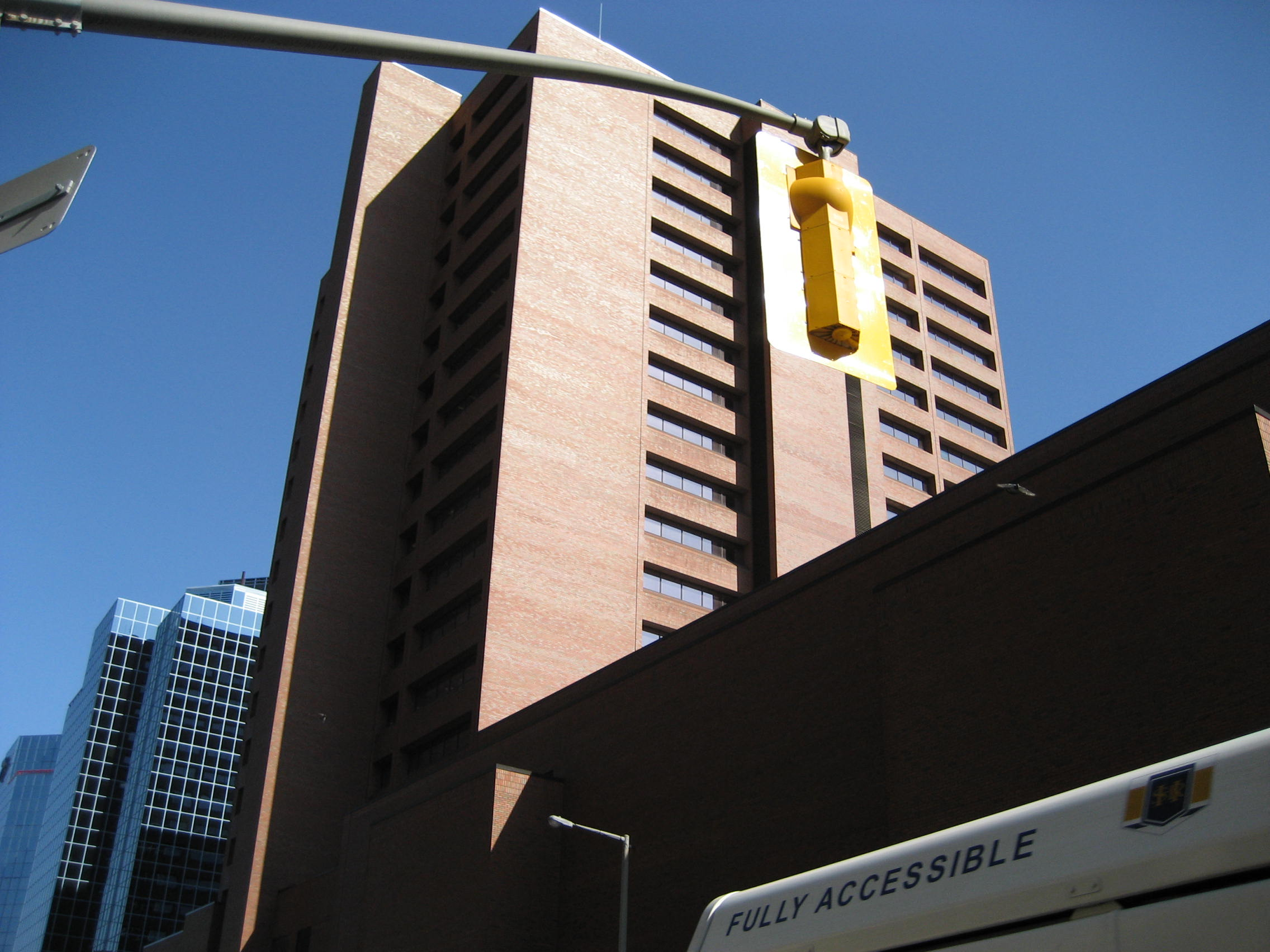
Ellen Fairclough Building

== See also ==
- Hamilton Convention Centre
- List of tallest buildings in Hamilton, Ontario
