= 120 King Street West =

Office building in Ontario, Canada

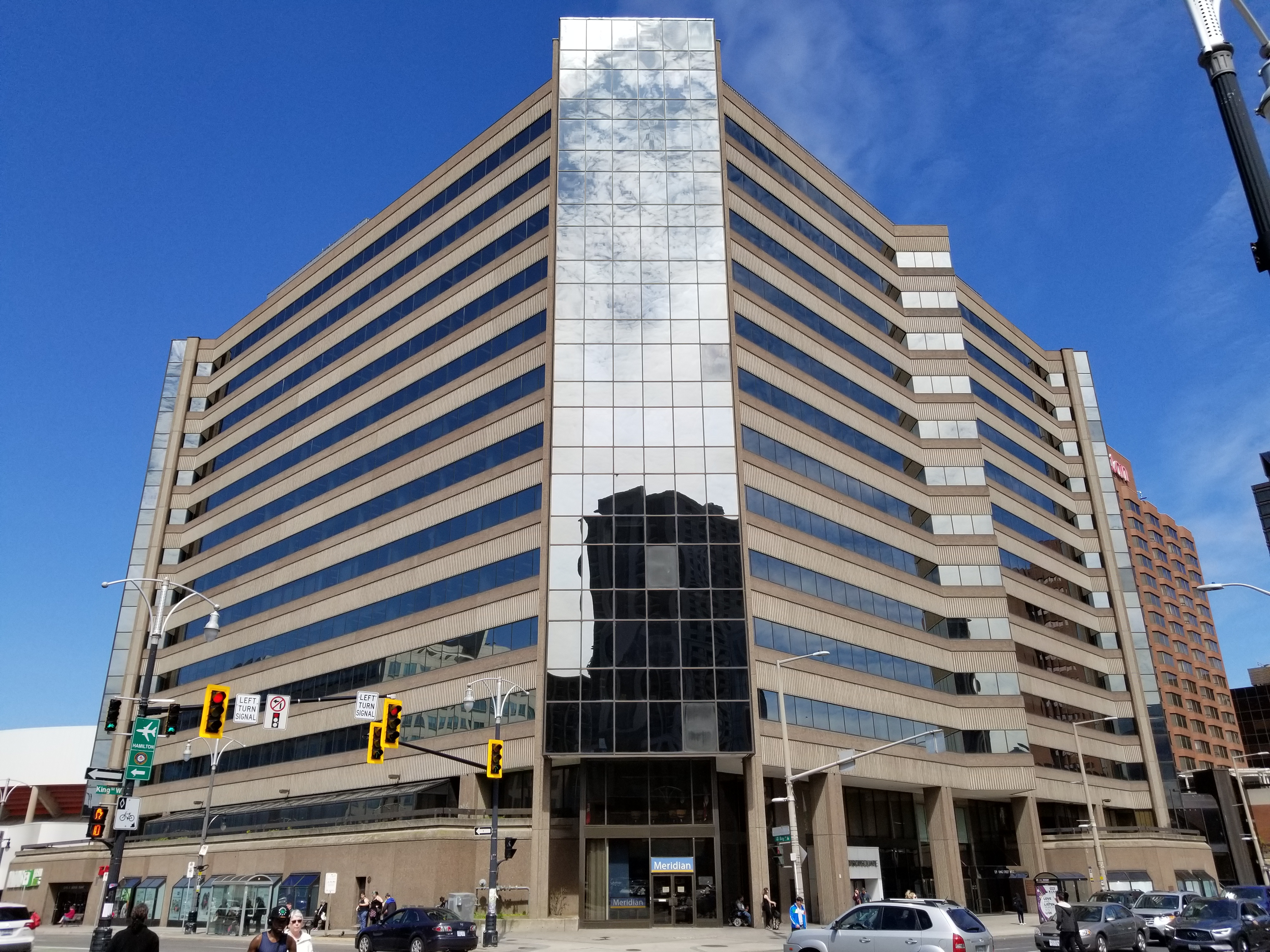
- 120 King Street West
- Interactive map of the 120 King Street West area
- Former names: Standard Life Centre

General information
- Type: Office
- Location: Hamilton, Ontario, Canada, 120 King Street West
- Coordinates: 43.25836°N 79.87310°W
- Completed: 1983; 43 years ago

Height
- Roof: 62 m (203 ft)

Technical details
- Floor count: 11
- Floor area: Low Rise: 3,570 m^{2} (38,400 sq ft) per floor; High Rise: 3,750 m^{2} (40,400 sq ft) per floor
- Lifts/elevators: 8

Design and construction
- Architect: Arthur C.F. Lau

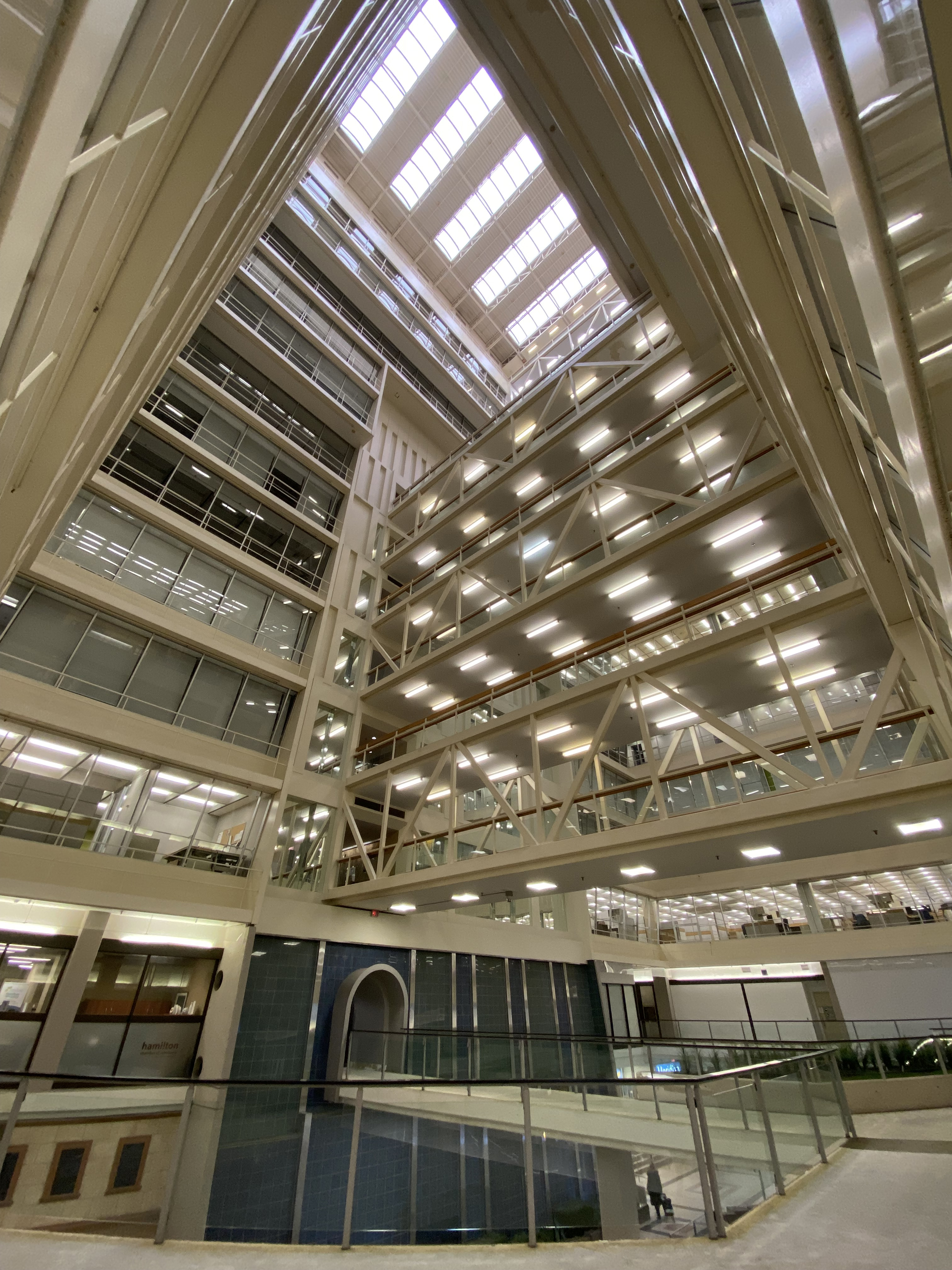
Standard Life Centre atrium

120 King Street West is an 11-story high-rise office building in Hamilton, Ontario, Canada. The 62-metre (203 ft) tall building was completed in 1983, and is part of the Lloyd D. Jackson Square complex. The building was originally named the Standard Life Centre, after the Standard Life Assurance Company of Canada, one of the companies responsible for the development of the Jackson Square complex.

== Description ==
The building's facade consists of alternating horizontal rows of concrete, and glass windows. The corners of the facade are clad entirely with glass.

The interior features a large lobby with granite walls and columns, a security desk, a digital directory, and two elevator banks. The low-rise elevator bank, located on the east side of the lobby, features four modernized Schindler elevators that serve floors 1 through 6, with one of the elevators serving the underground parking lot. The high-rise elevator bank, located on the West side of the lobby, also features four modernized Schindler elevators that serve floors 7 through 11, with one of the elevators serving the underground parking lot, as well as the mechanical floor. All of the elevators from both banks serve the plaza level. The building also features escalators and stairs that lead from the main level (lobby and mall) to the plaza level.

The interior of 120 King Street West features a large central atrium with a fountain at its base, as well as column-free floor plates. The Jackson Square mall and the three other office buildings in the complex are accessible from the lobby level. The building features a large common underground parking lot with a capacity of 1,300 vehicles.

== Images ==
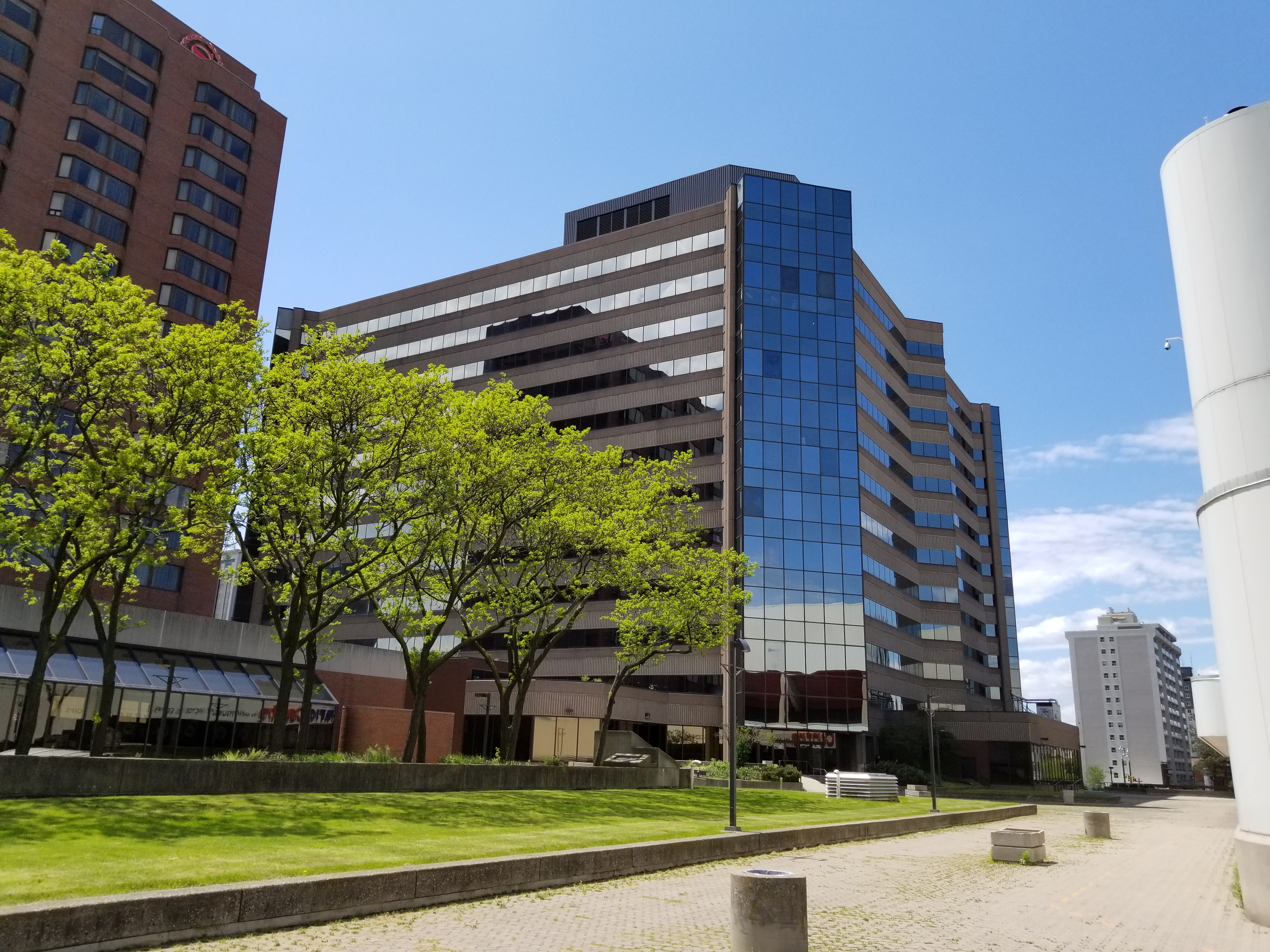
Standard Life Centre viewed from the Jackson Square rooftop plaza

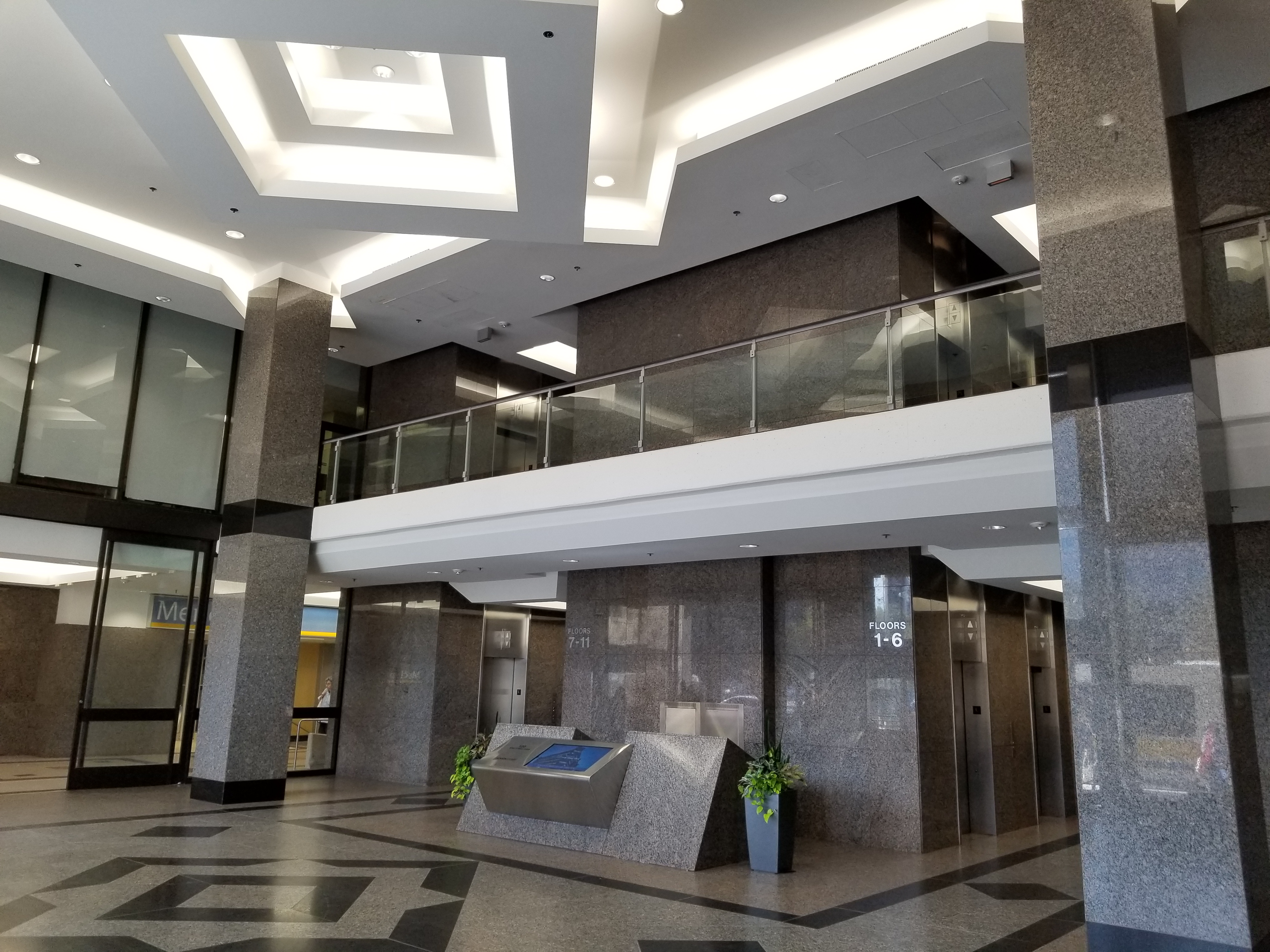
Standard Life Centre lobby

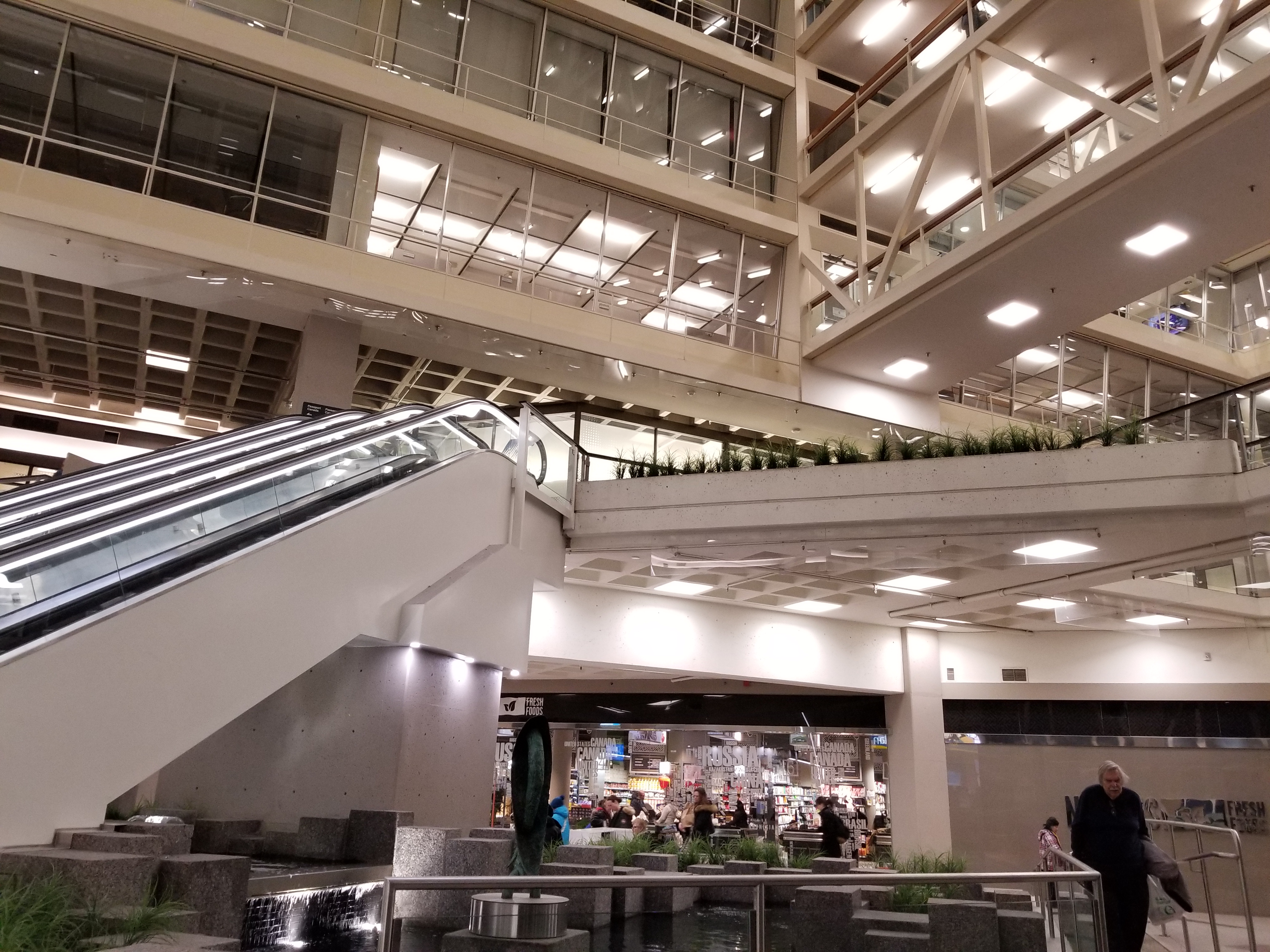
The West portion of the Jackson Square mall, within the Standard Life Centre atrium

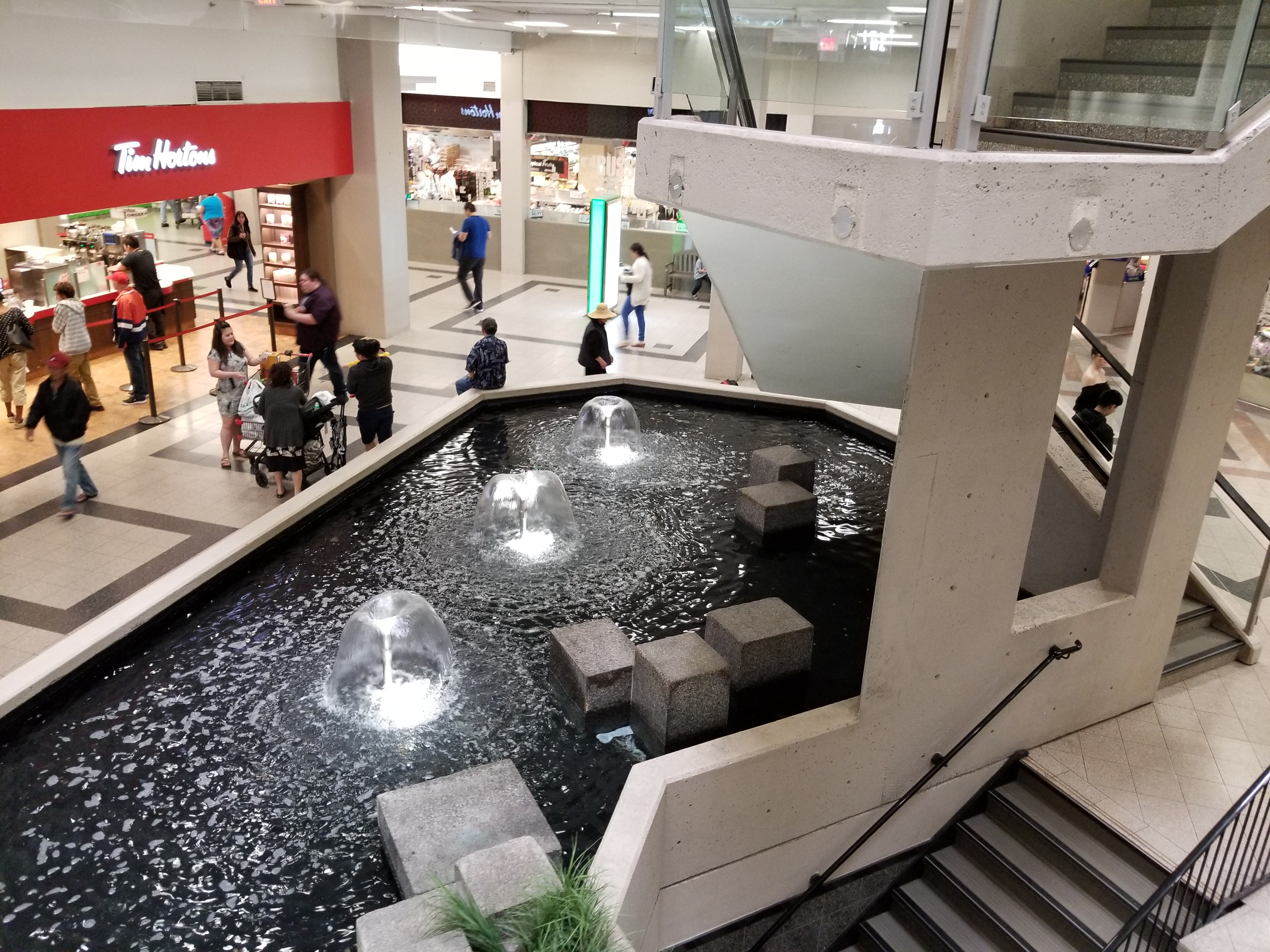
Fountain in the West portion of the Jackson Square mall, within the Standard Life Centre atrium

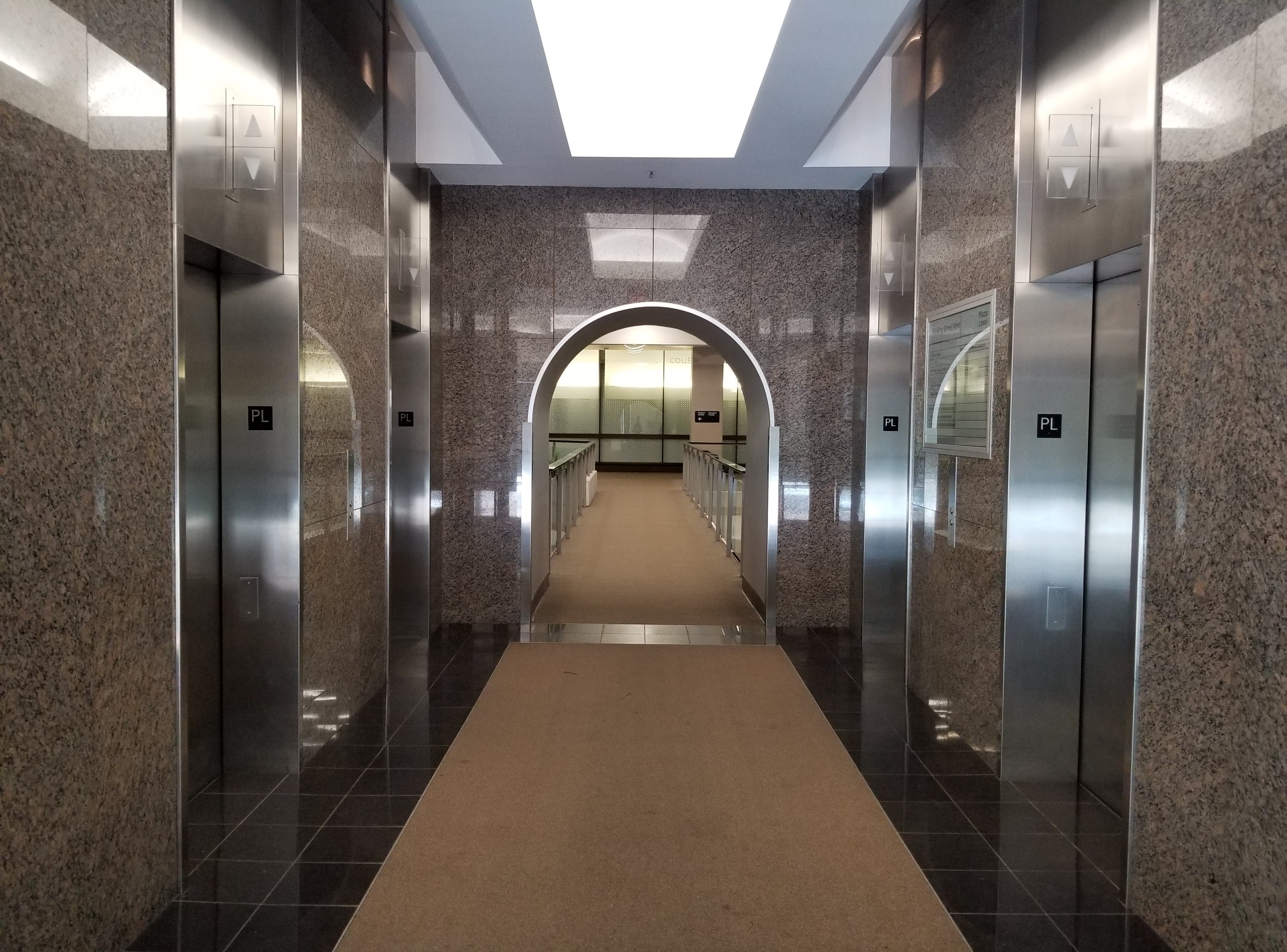
Standard Life Centre plaza level and low-rise elevator bank; looking into the atrium

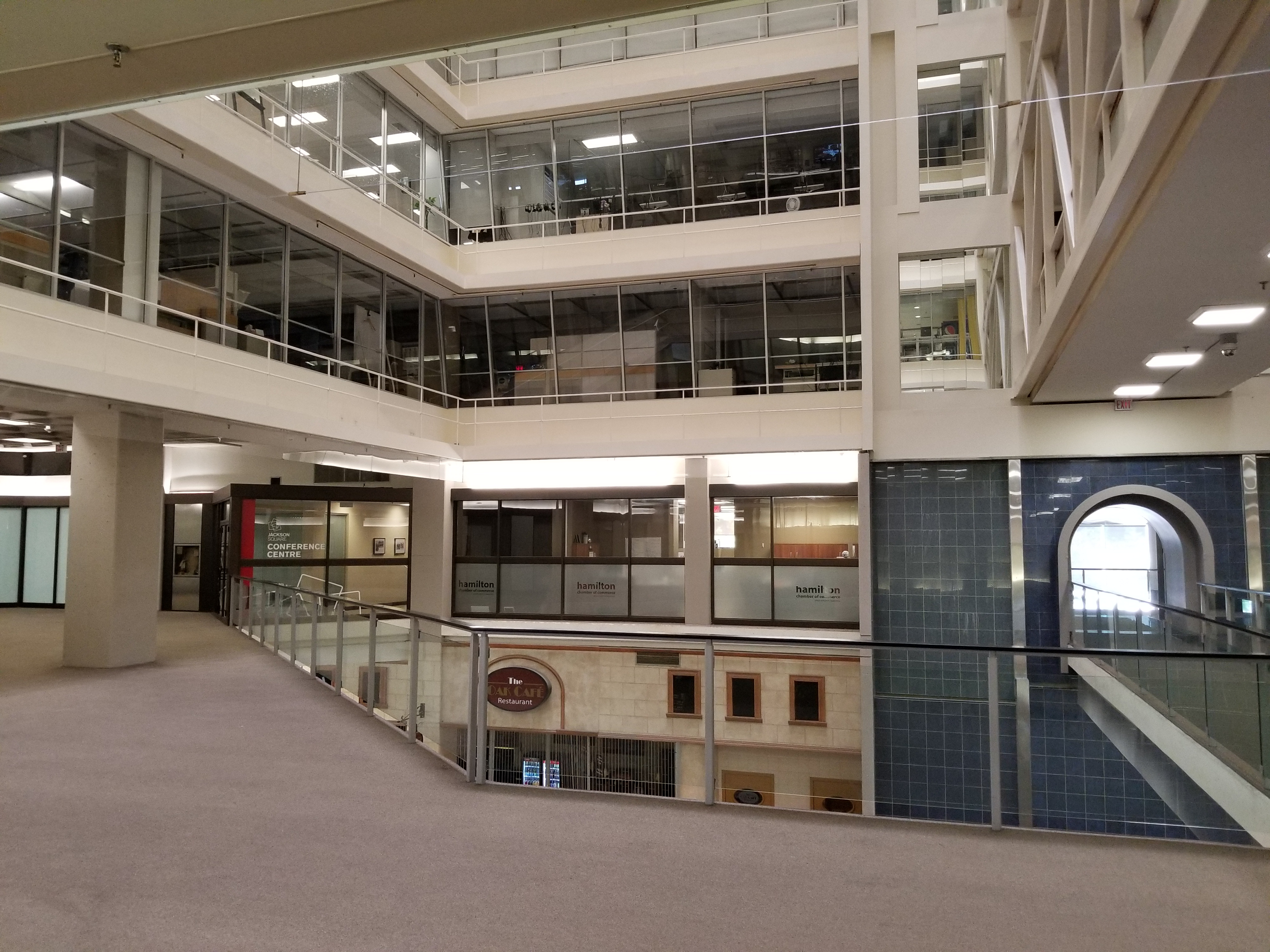
Standard Life Centre plaza level

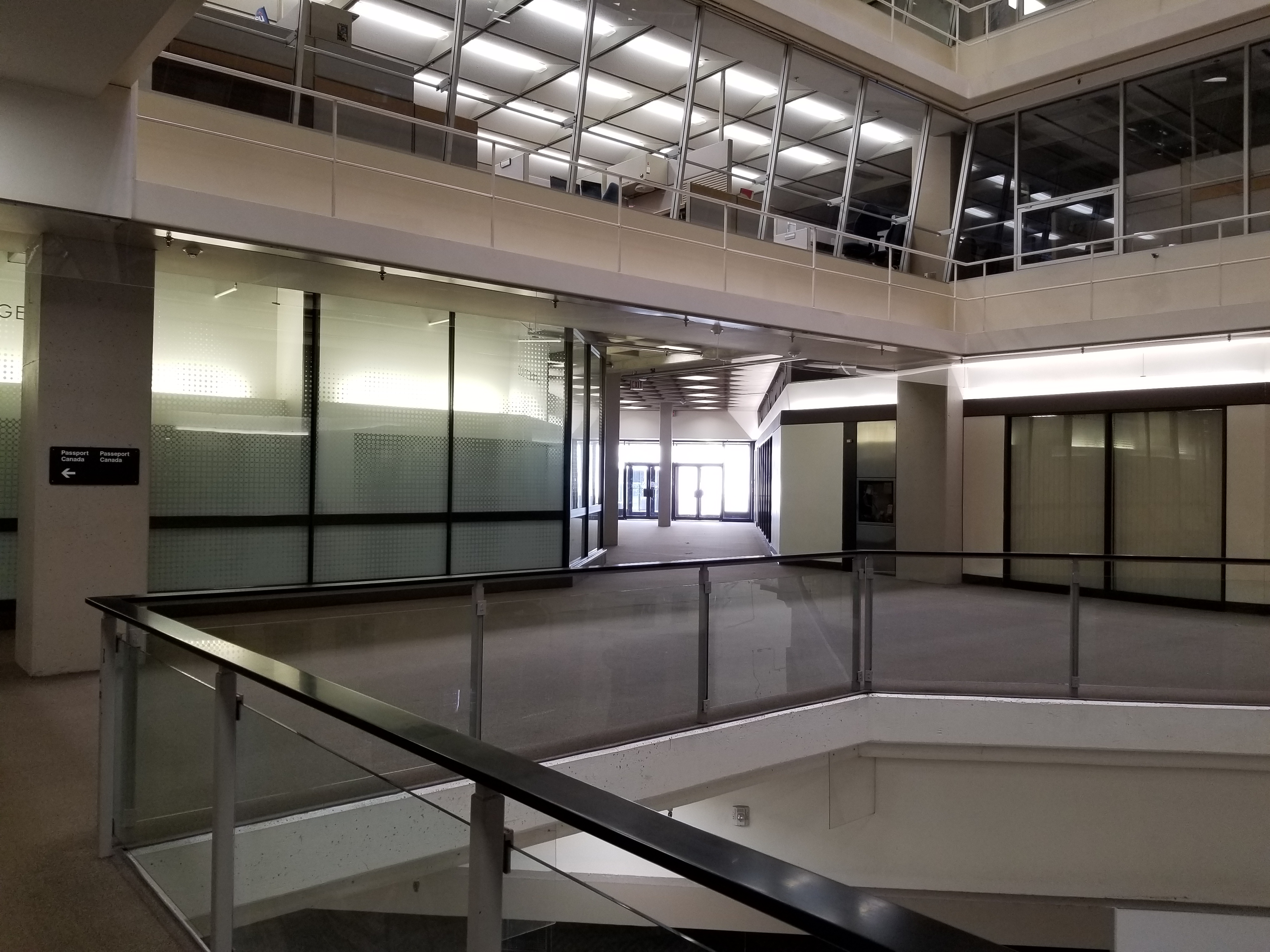
Standard Life Centre plaza level

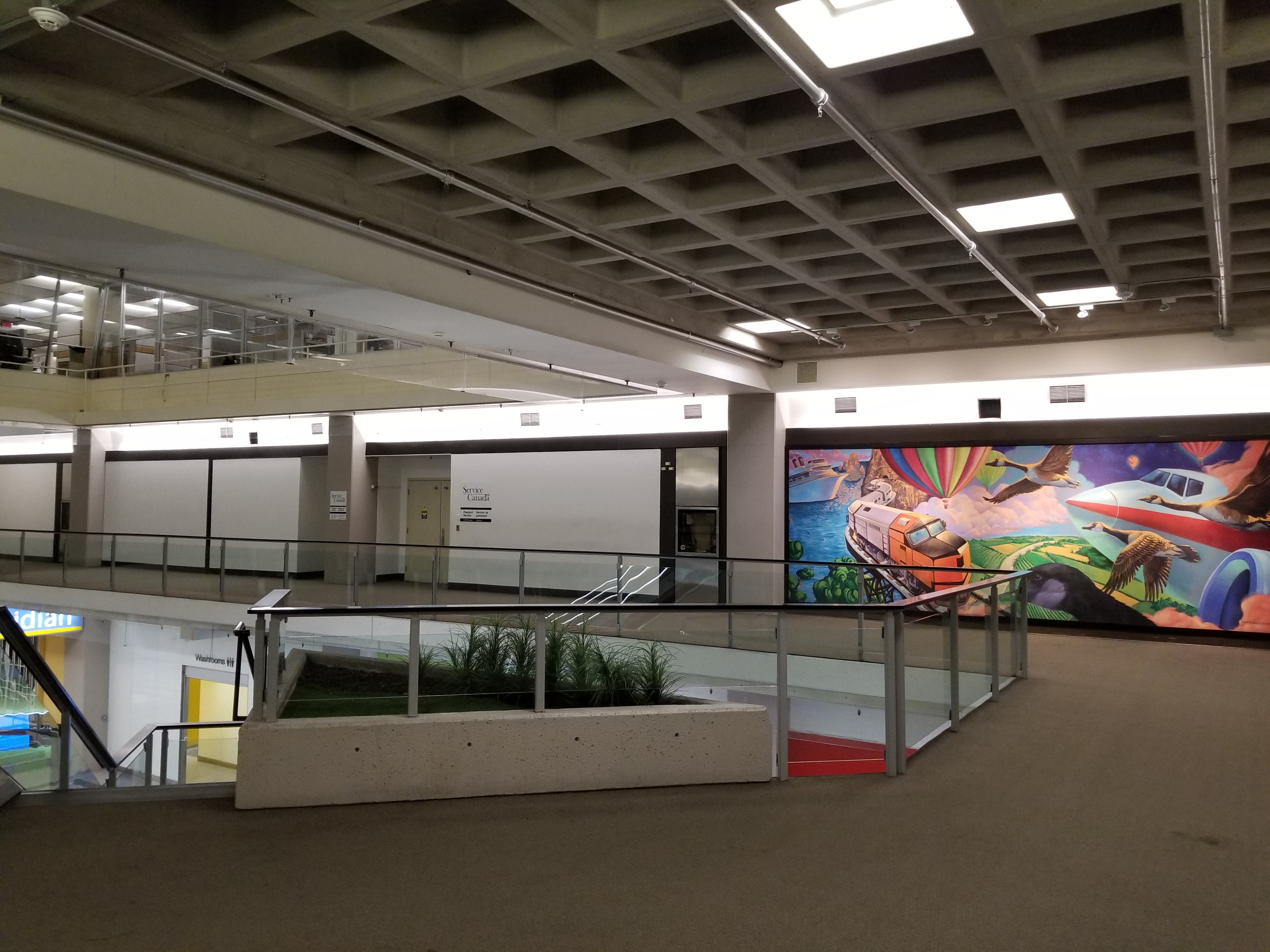
Standard Life Centre plaza level

== See also ==
- Lloyd D. Jackson Square
- 100 King Street West
- 1 James Street North
- Robert Thomson Building
- List of tallest buildings in Hamilton, Ontario
