= Lloyd D. Jackson Square =

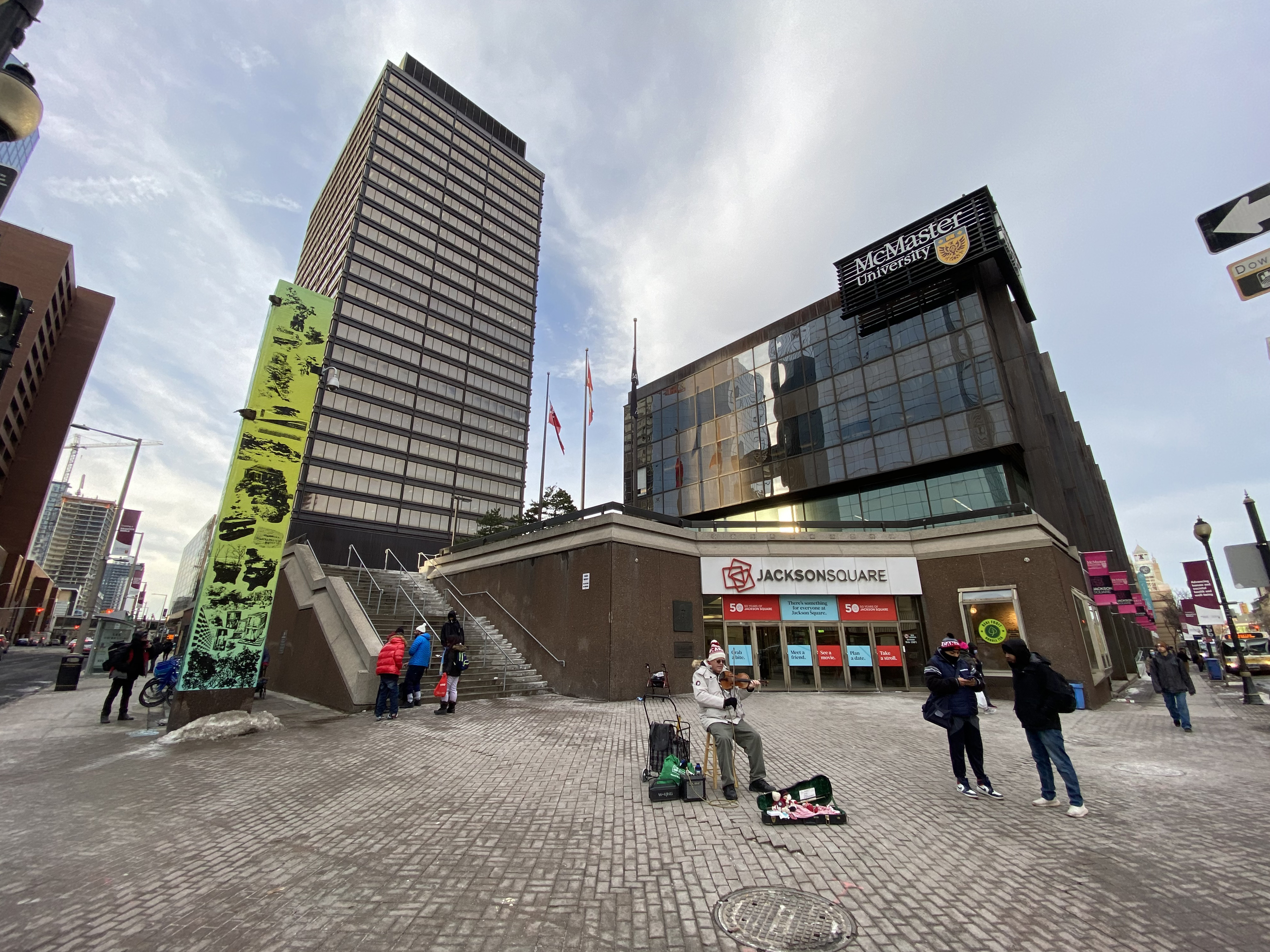
- Jackson Square King Street and James Street entrance
- Location: Hamilton, Ontario, Canada
- Coordinates: 43.258°N 79.869°W
- Address: 2 King Street West
- Opened: 1972; 54 years ago
- Developer: Yale Properties Limited, Standard Life Assurance Company of Canada
- Manager: Real Properties Limited (Joint-venture company owned by Yale Properties Limited and Manulife Financial)
- Owner: First Real Properties Limited, Second Real Properties Limited, Fourth Real Properties Limited
- Num. of stores: Approximately 230
- Num. of anchor tenants: 6 Hart, Landmark Cinemas, Nations Fresh Foods, LCBO, McMaster University's Centre for Continuing Education, TD Canada Trust
- Floor area: Approximately 390,000 sq ft (36,000 m^{2})
- Floors: 1 (Retail), 43 (Office)
- Website: jacksonsquare.ca

Lloyd D. Jackson Square, or simply Jackson Square, is an indoor shopping mall, commercial, and entertainment complex located in the downtown core of Hamilton, Ontario, Canada, which is named after Lloyd Douglas Jackson, who served as mayor of the city from 1950 to 1962. The civic square is located in the centre of the city, bounded by several major roads: King Street (south), Bay Street (west), York Boulevard (north) and James Street (east), with the appointed address being 2 King Street West. The mall opened in 1972.

== History ==
Demolition of the businesses on the eastern portion of King Street West bounded by James Street North began in late 1968 and was completed by the early summer of 1969. Throughout the construction of the first phase of the civic square, renamed Lloyd D. Jackson Square a year later, unfavourable reviews frequently appeared, although some labelled the square "a people's place." Representatives of local disabled organizations also criticized the developer's refusal to add in wheelchair ramps. Yet, on August 22, 1972, thousands of people climbed to the complex's plaza roof and engaged in a massive ceremony that included live music, food and a fireworks show signalling the grand opening of the mall and adjacent Bank of Montreal's commercial pavilion.

=== Early years ===
Despite protests against the design of the square, Jackson Square remained an economic success and an important centre of life in the city through the 1970s and into the mid-1980s. After years of dispute and confusion over the future of the Hamilton Farmer's Market, it was consolidated into a new indoor space in 1980, coupled with a new, larger central library. Then in 1983, the Standard Life Centre office tower opened at the west end of the complex. And two years later, a 19-story Sheraton Hotel with a pool and overhead connection to the Hamilton Convention Centre opened up alongside a 19,000-seat sports arena called Copps Coliseum (now TD Coliseum).

=== Decline ===
The general downturn of department stores and malls, combined with competition from Limeridge Mall which opened on the Hamilton escarpment in 1981, proved difficult for Jackson Square. In 1989 Yale Properties announced it would close the skating rink and replace it with a daycare centre for the office workers, an idea that never came to full fruition. By 1994, as high-end chain clothing stores and smaller local boutiques left the mall in quick succession, Jackson Square became a haven for delinquent activity. In 1996, Le Château, Bianca Nygård, and two other stores left from the mall. Unfortunately, two months later, in October 1996, the 25 non-profit groups that came to inhabit Jackson Square faced eviction, and engaged in a battle with Yale Properties that ended abruptly on October 10, 1998, with their 30-day notice of eviction. Likewise the office complexes saw a decline in occupation. The final blow for Jackson Square came in 1997, when the Bank of Montreal announced that it would be leaving its commercial pavilion and moving to its own lot on the corner of Main and Bay Street. Then, two years later, the famous Eaton's department store collapsed and was annexed by The Bay which refused to take over space in the Eaton Centre.

=== Renovation ===
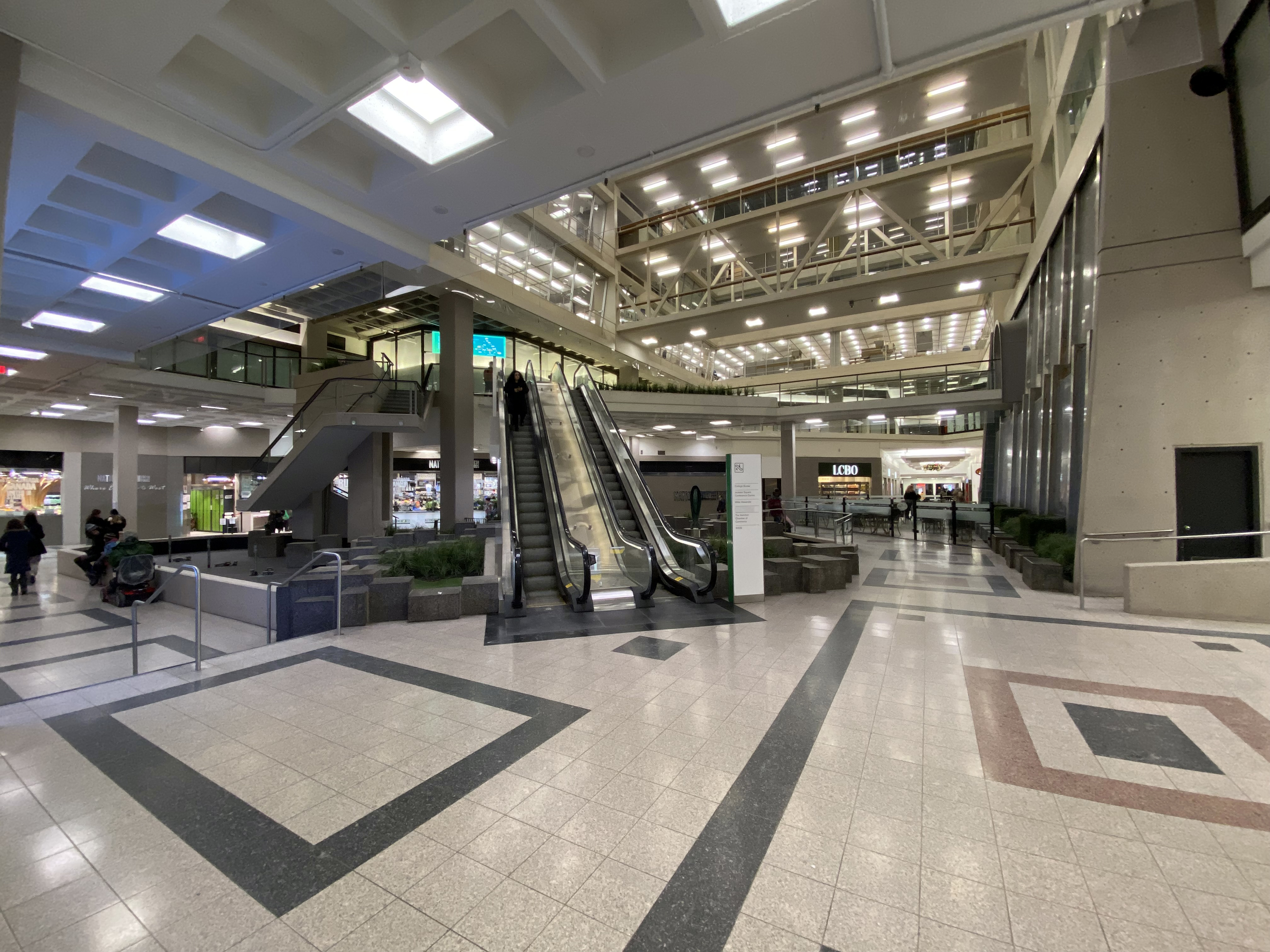
Atrium in 120 King Street West

After the release of the Hamilton Spectator's Code Red study in the Spring of 2010 revealed that the downtown core was a food desert, significantly contributing to the poverty and ill-health of the city's poorest citizens, Manager of the Economic Development Department Glen Norton placed an offer of $650,000 in grants as an incentive for a private grocer to build in the core. Jackson Square management announced that it would be the home of the new Nations Fresh Foods grocery store in the spring of 2013, which would take over the mall's western retail portion in the lobby of the Standard Life Centre. The store opened on July 13, 2013. On March 25, 2015, a new LCBO was unveiled in the mall. The 5,530 square foot store was placed beside Nations Fresh Foods in the mall's west end and contains over 4,473 square feet of display space.

Today, the mall is again suffering from high vacancy.

== Retailers and amenities ==
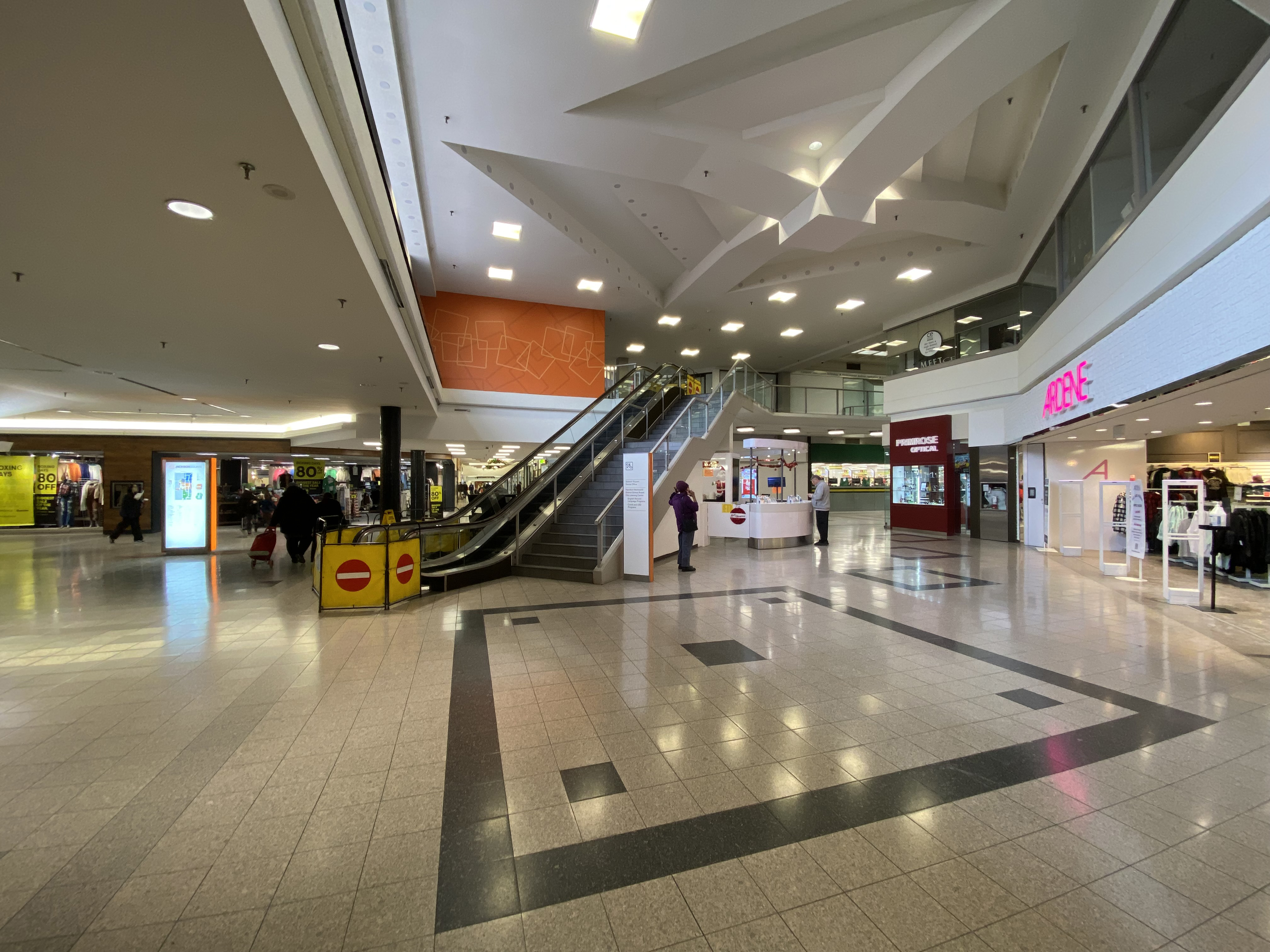
Interior of the mall (2022)

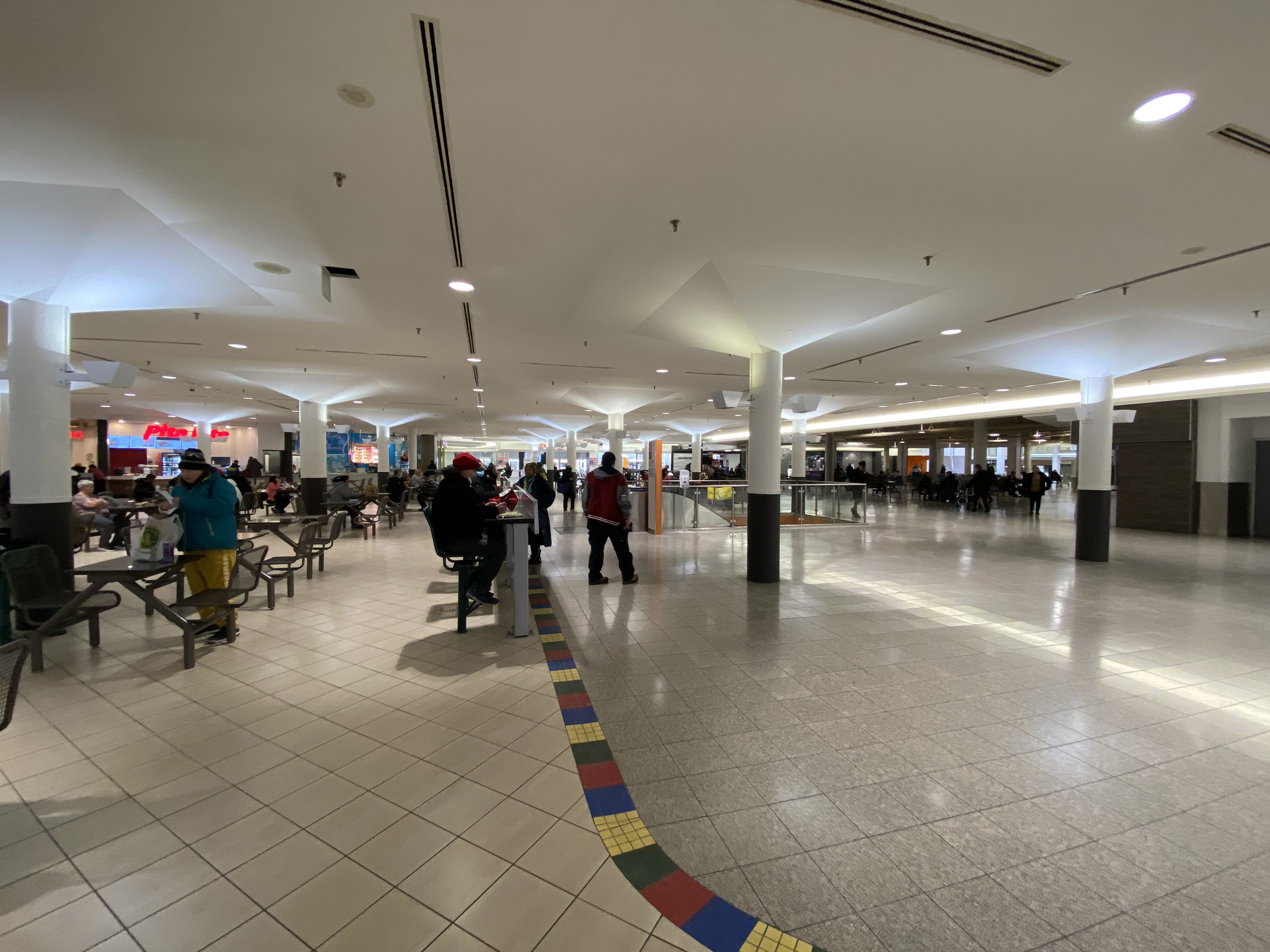
Food Court

Previously, the mall had two food courts: the Food Festival and the Market Court. The former shut down with the closure of the City Centre, and the latter leads to the back-end of the Hamilton Farmer's Market. Many stores, restaurants and a six-screen movie theatre operated by Landmark Cinemas are included in the mall's inventory. The complex is also connected to the Sheraton Hamilton Hotel, TD Coliseum, Hamilton Convention Centre/Ellen Fairclough Building, Hamilton City Centre, and Hamilton Public Library Central Branch.

The mall is also equipped with elevators, escalators, public washrooms, a lost & found department and an underground parking lot with a 1300 vehicle capacity and available EV charging stations that can be accessed by two entrance/exits, one on King Street West and the other on Bay Street North.

== Office component ==
The Lloyd D. Jackson Square complex includes four office buildings that are directly attached to the mall. 100 King Street West (formerly Stelco Tower) and 1 James Street North (formerly the Bank of Montreal Pavilion) are located at the East end of the complex, the Robert Thomson Building (110 King Street West) is located in the centre, and 120 King Street West (formerly the Standard Life Centre) is located at the West end.

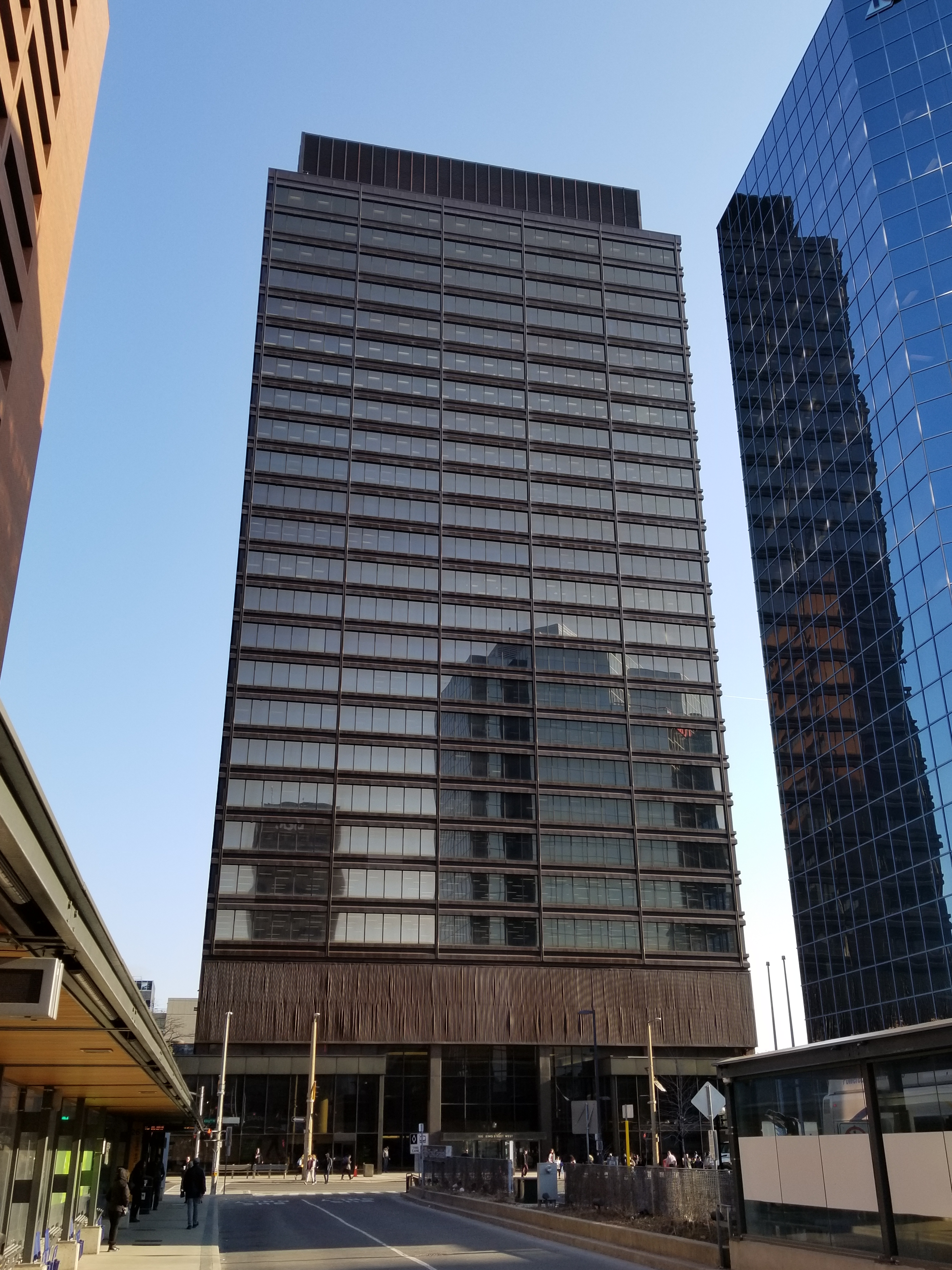
100 King Street West is the tallest of the four office buildings in the Jackson Square complex.

== See also ==
- Chateau Royale (Hamilton, Ontario)
- Pigott Building
- The Centre on Barton
