= 1 James Street North =

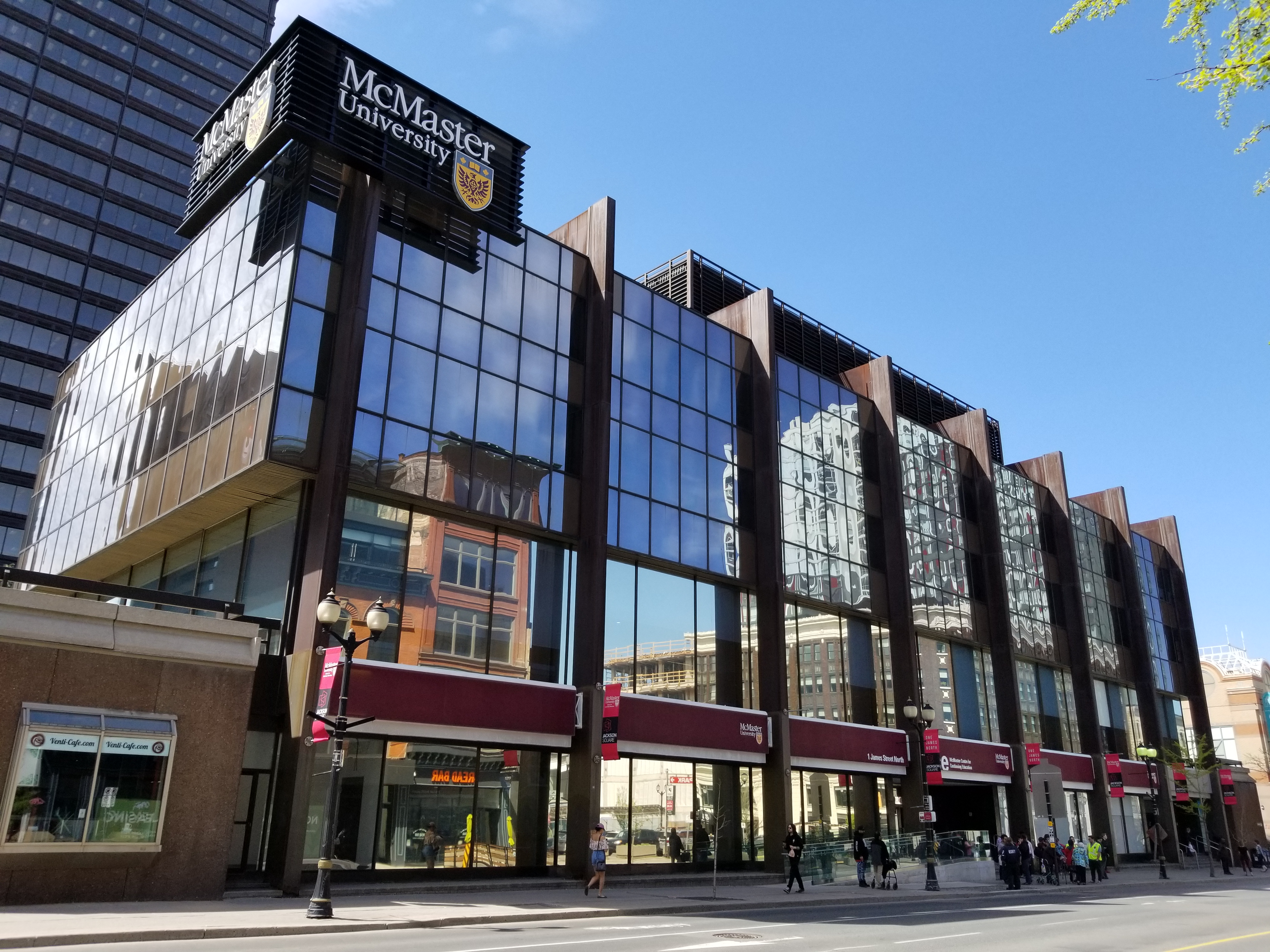
- 1 James Street North
- Interactive map of the 1 James Street North area
- Former names: Bank of Montreal Pavilion

General information
- Type: Office
- Location: Hamilton, Ontario, Canada, 1 James Street North
- Coordinates: 43.25728°N 79.86901°W
- Completed: 1972; 54 years ago

Height
- Roof: 17 m (56 ft)

Technical details
- Floor count: 5
- Floor area: 16,667 sq ft per floor
- Lifts/elevators: 2

Design and construction
- Architect: Arthur C.F. Lau

1 James Street North is a 5-storey low-rise office building in Hamilton, Ontario, Canada. The building was completed in 1972, and is part of the Lloyd D. Jackson Square complex. The building was originally named the Bank of Montreal Pavilion, after the Bank of Montreal, the building's original anchor tenant.

== History ==
In 1972, when the Pavilion was constructed, the Bank of Montreal occupied the entire building. However, in 1997, BMO left the building and moved to a new location at the corner of Main and Bay streets, leaving the entire building vacant for almost 18 years.

In 2014, McMaster University discovered that the courthouse that they were leasing from the city of Hamilton was to be converted back into a courthouse, and that the university would have to vacate the building. McMaster then decided to lease the old BMO pavilion, as the amount of square footage that the building offered was just the right amount. In April 2015, the McMaster Centre for Continuing Education, occupying the first two floors, opened its doors to students and educators. The remaining floors are occupied by various financial areas.

== Description ==
The building's facade consists of glass windows, segmented into 7 sections by 8 large Stelcoloy steel columns on the East and West sides of the building. The interior features a lobby with granite floors and a steel-clad elevator bank. The elevator bank features 2 Otis elevators that serve the plaza level (labeled "floor 2" on the elevator buttons), floors 3 and 4, as well as the underground parking lot. The building also features stairs that lead from the main level (lobby and mall) to the plaza level. The plaza level of 1 James Street North features 14 foot floor-to-ceiling windows, and the building features column-free floor plates. The Jackson Square mall, as well as the 3 other office buildings in the complex are accessible from the lobby level. The building features a large common underground parking lot with a capacity of 1300 vehicles.

== Images ==
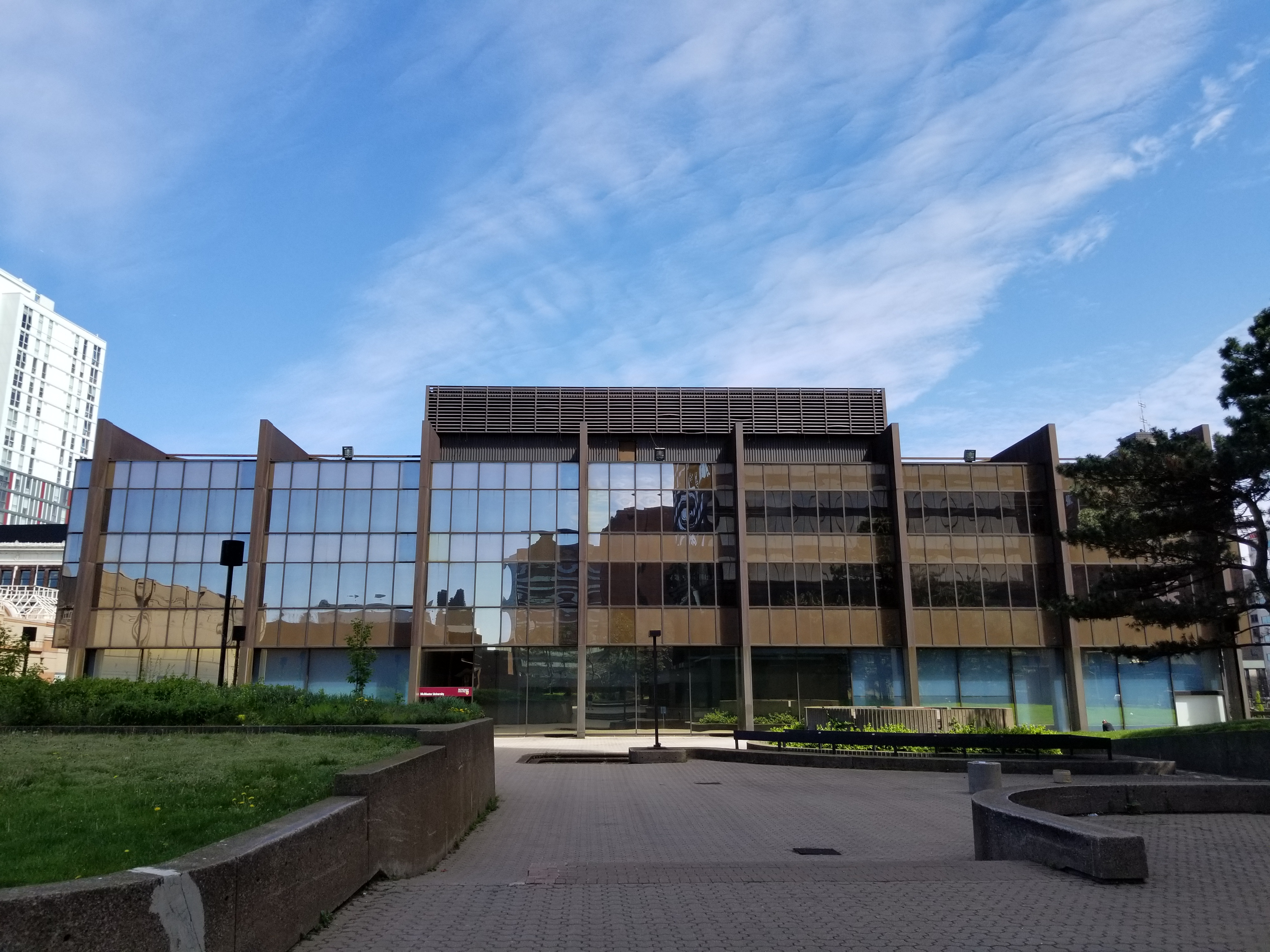
Bank of Montreal Pavilion viewed from the Jackson Square rooftop plaza

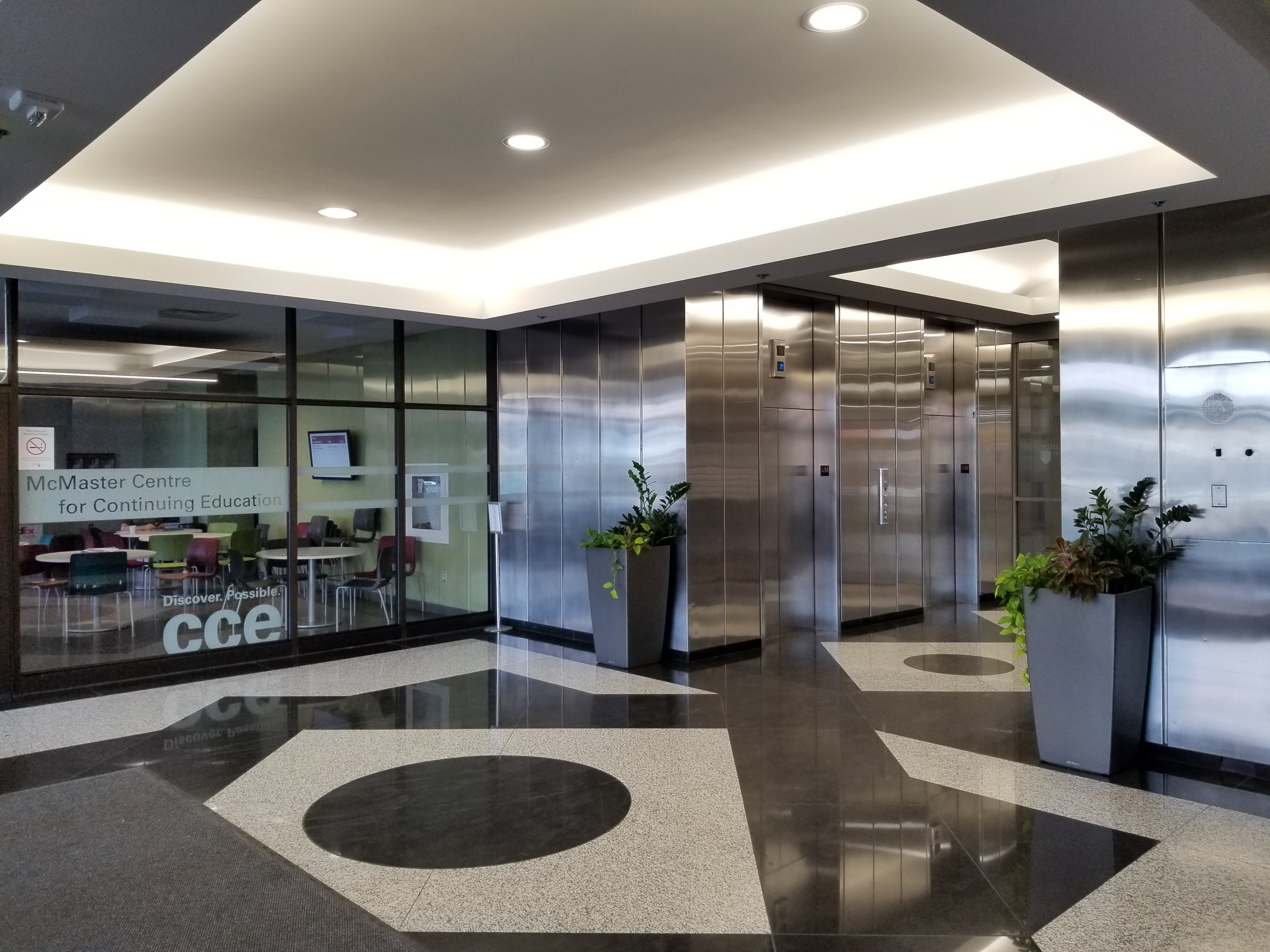
BMO Pavilion lobby

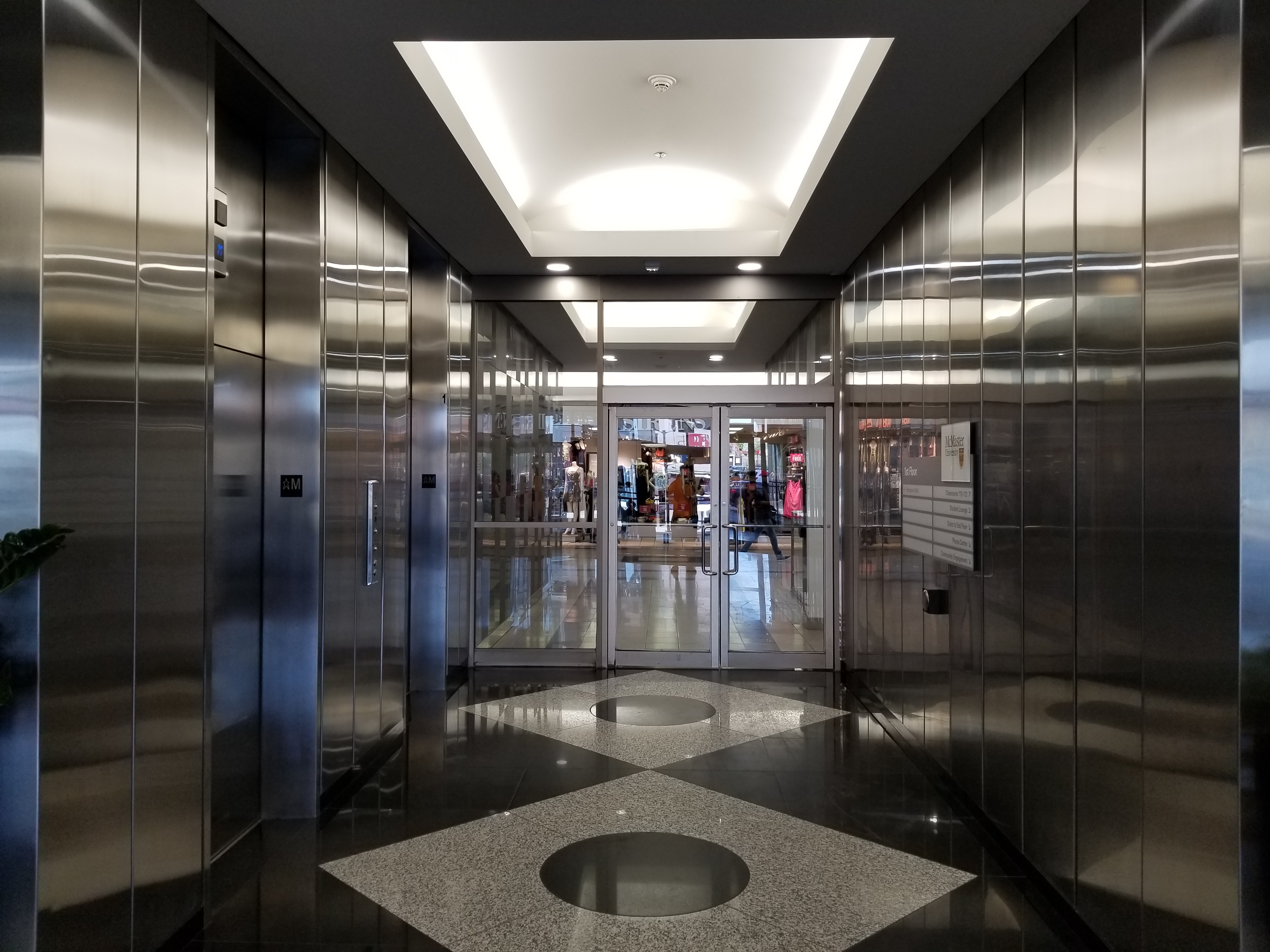
BMO Pavilion elevator bank

== See also ==
- Lloyd D. Jackson Square
- 100 King Street West
- Robert Thomson Building
- 120 King Street West
