= 100 King Street West =

Third tallest building in Hamilton, Ontario

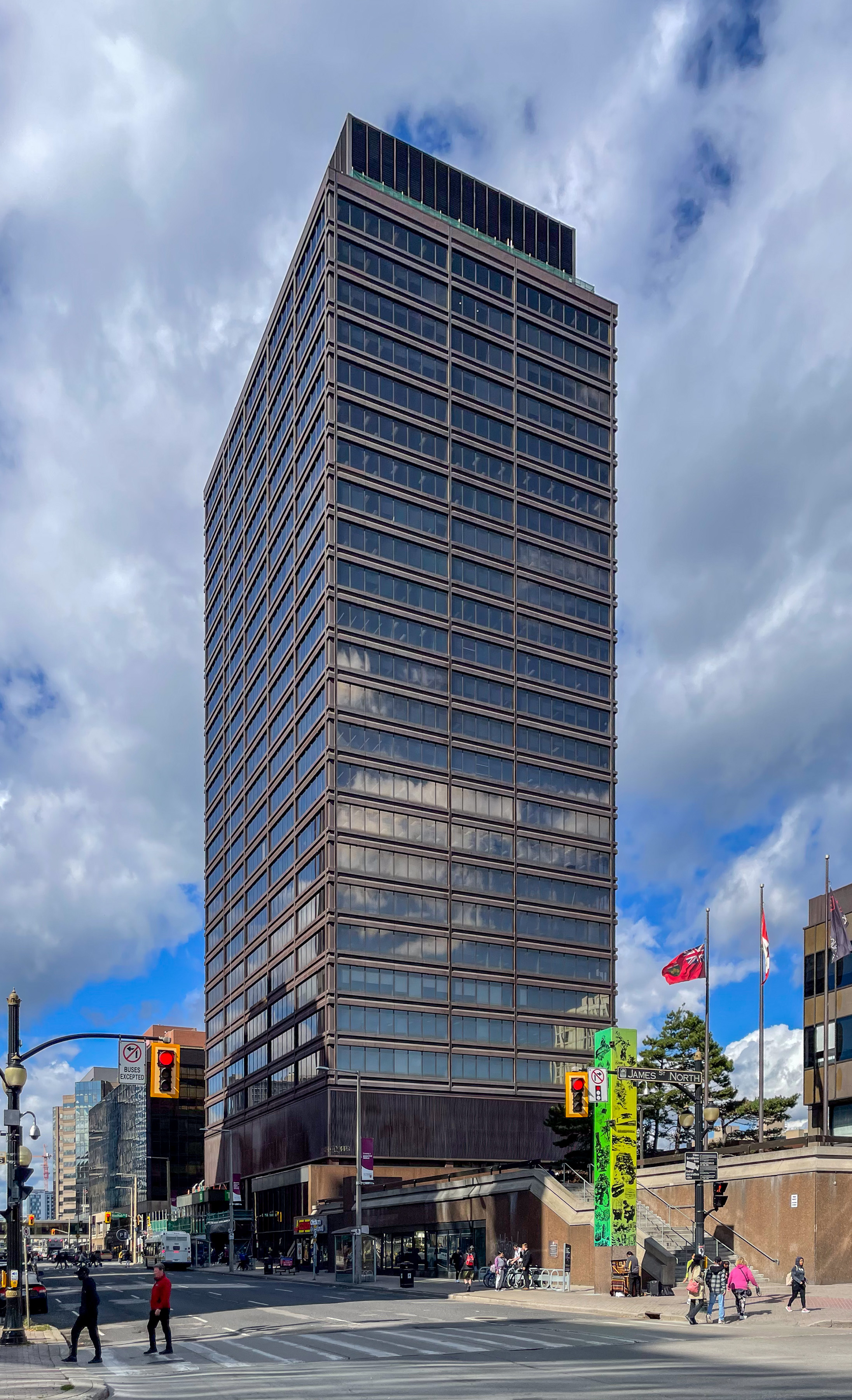
- 100 King Street West
- Interactive map of the 100 King Street West area
- Former names: Stelco Tower

General information
- Type: Office
- Architectural style: International
- Location: Hamilton, Ontario, Canada, 100 King Street West
- Coordinates: 43.25734°N 79.87045°W
- Completed: 1972; 54 years ago

Height
- Roof: 103 m (338 ft)

Technical details
- Floor count: 25
- Floor area: 1,579 m^{2} (17,000 ft^{2}) per floor
- Lifts/elevators: 10

Design and construction
- Architect: Arthur C.F. Lau

100 King Street West, formerly known as Stelco Tower, is the third tallest building in Hamilton, Ontario, Canada. The 103 metres (338 ft), 25-storey office skyscraper was completed in 1972, and is part of the larger Lloyd D. Jackson Square complex.

== History ==
The tower was built as the head office of Stelco, Canada's largest steel producer and one of Hamilton's largest employers. The company used the tower to demonstrate the versatility of steel and to showcase its newest development, "Stelcoloy"; a specialised steel alloy designed to slowly rust over time. The rust helps protect the steel from further damage. This process of oxidation accounts for the steel's unique self-colouring nature; the steel was grey-blue when the building was first erected.

== Description ==
The building's facade consists of alternating horizontal rows of Stelcoloy steel, and glass windows. The interior features a large lobby with granite floors, a security desk, a digital directory, and 2 steel-clad elevator banks. The low-rise elevator bank, located on the east side of the lobby, features 4 modernized Otis elevators that serve floors 2 through 14, with one of the elevators serving the underground parking lot. The high-rise elevator bank, located on the West side of the lobby, features 5 modernized Otis elevators that serve floors 15 through 24, with one of the elevators serving the underground parking lot, as well as mechanical floors 1 and 25. There is a single Otis elevator between the 2 elevator banks that serves the plaza level and the underground parking lot. The lobby also features escalators and stairs that lead to the plaza level. The building features column-free floor plates, and is a rare example of a modern skyscraper that features a mail chute. The Jackson Square mall, as well as the 3 other office buildings in the complex are accessible from the lobby level. The building features a large common underground parking lot with a capacity of 1300 vehicles.

== Images ==
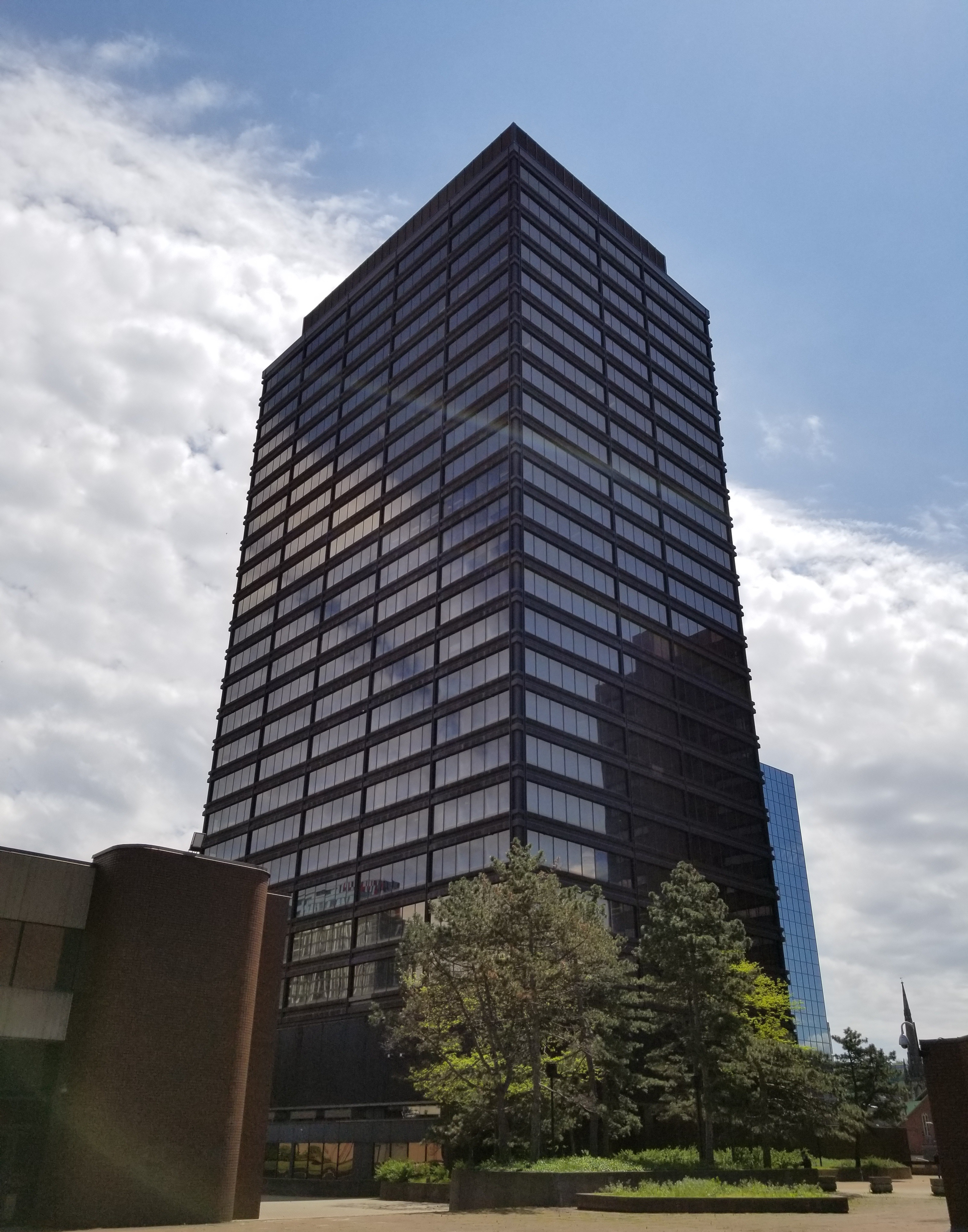
Stelco Tower viewed from the Jackson Square rooftop plaza

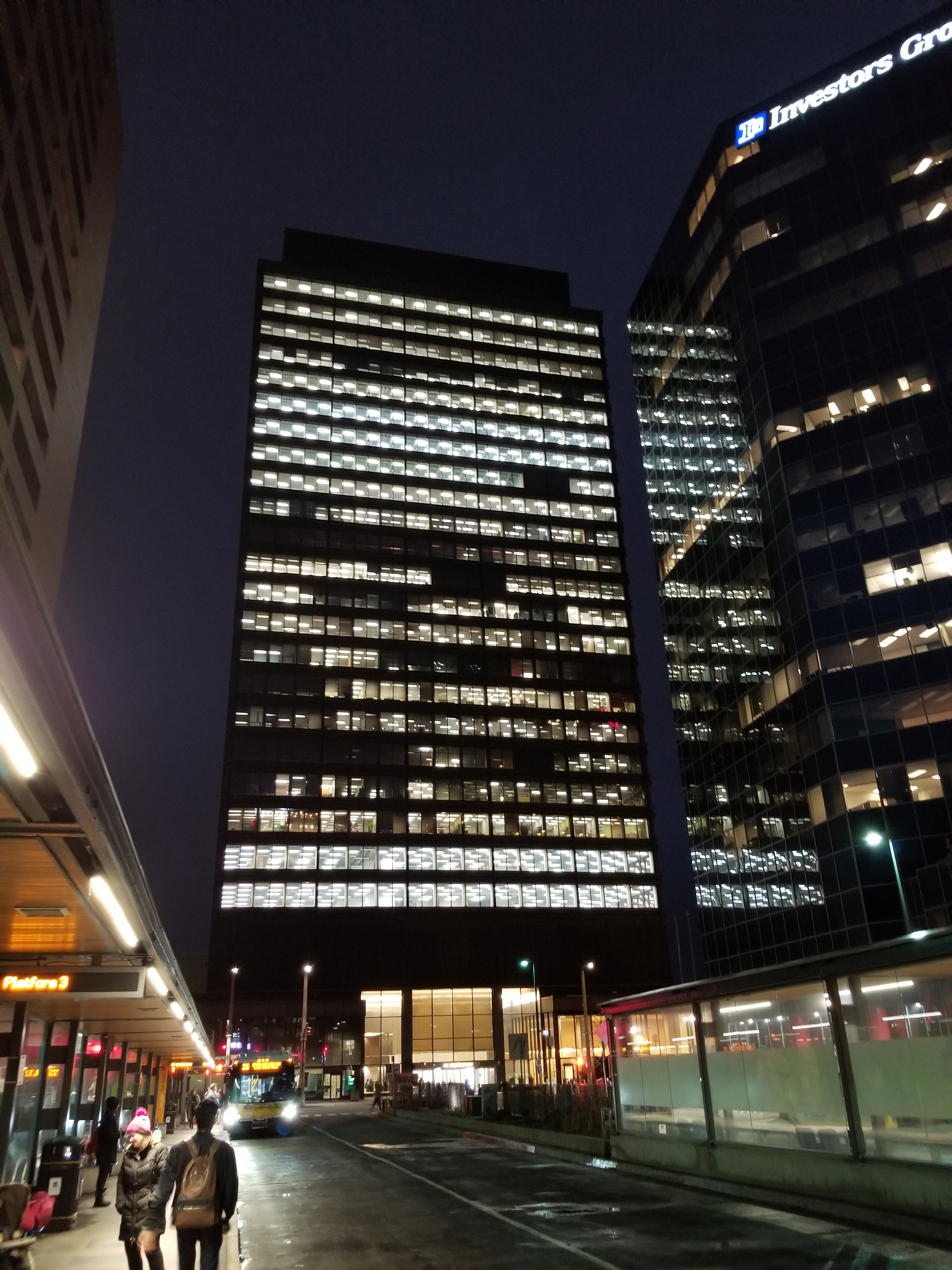
Stelco Tower at dusk

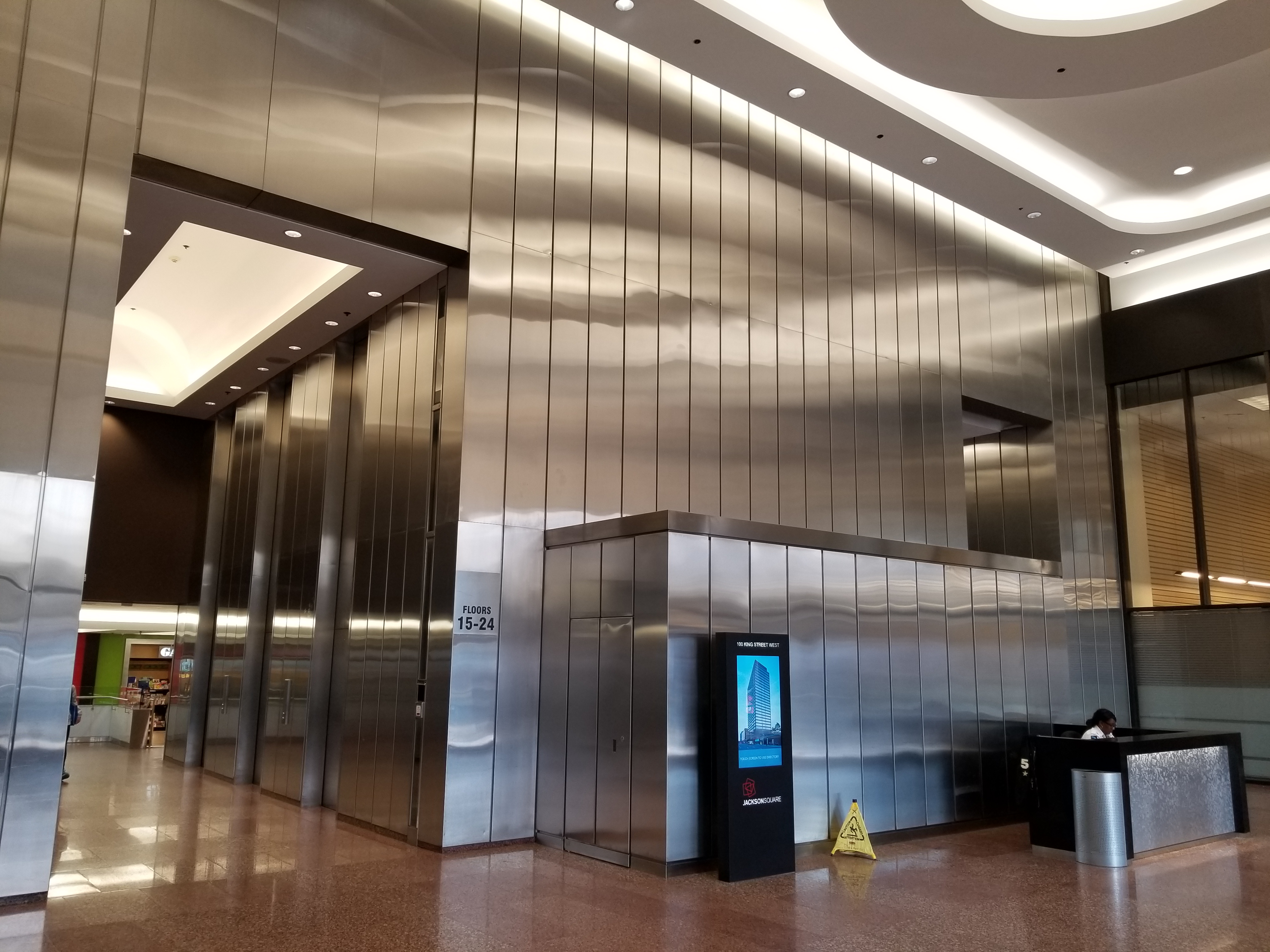
Stelco Tower lobby

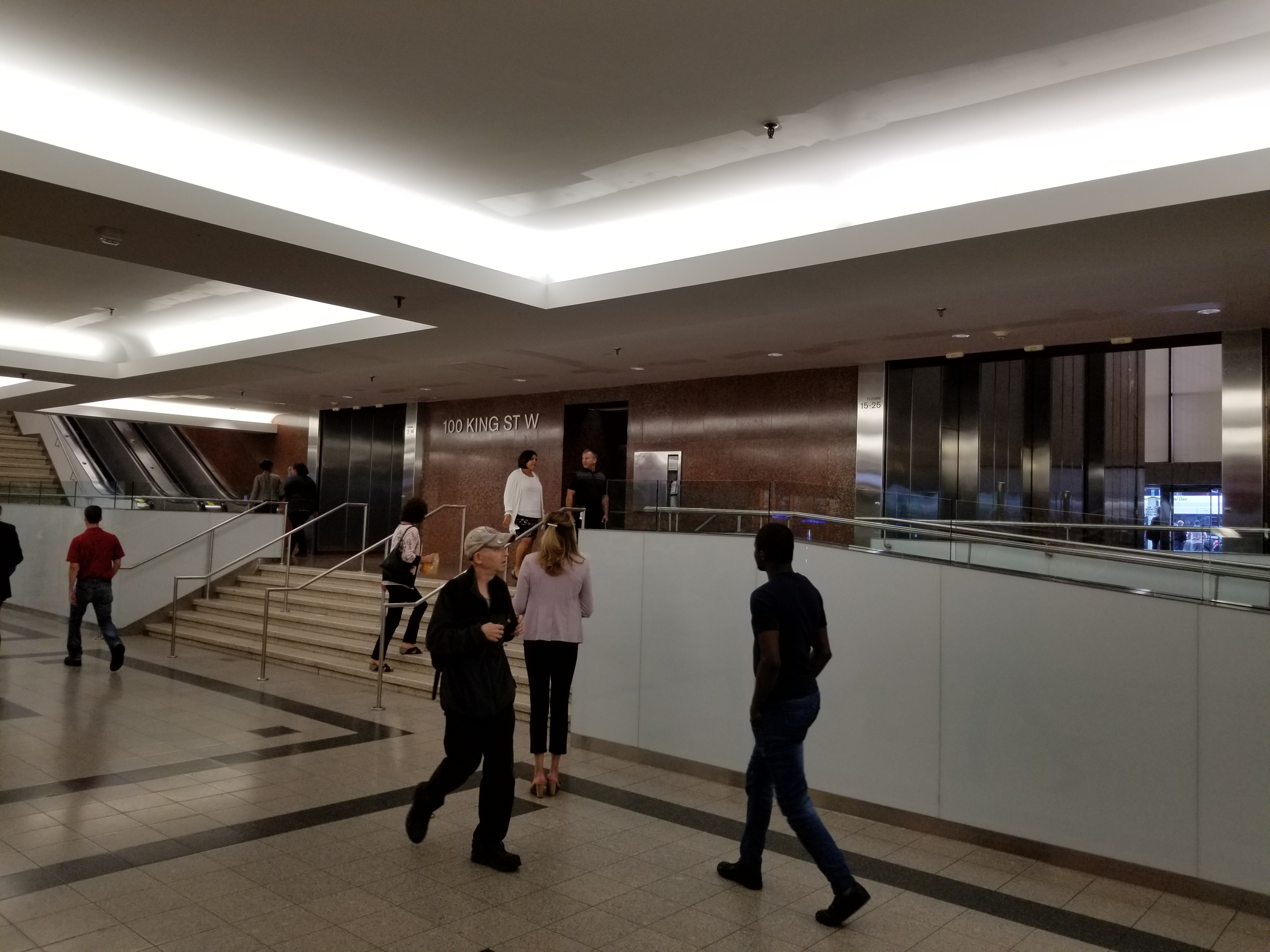
Stelco Tower lobby viewed from the Jackson Square mall

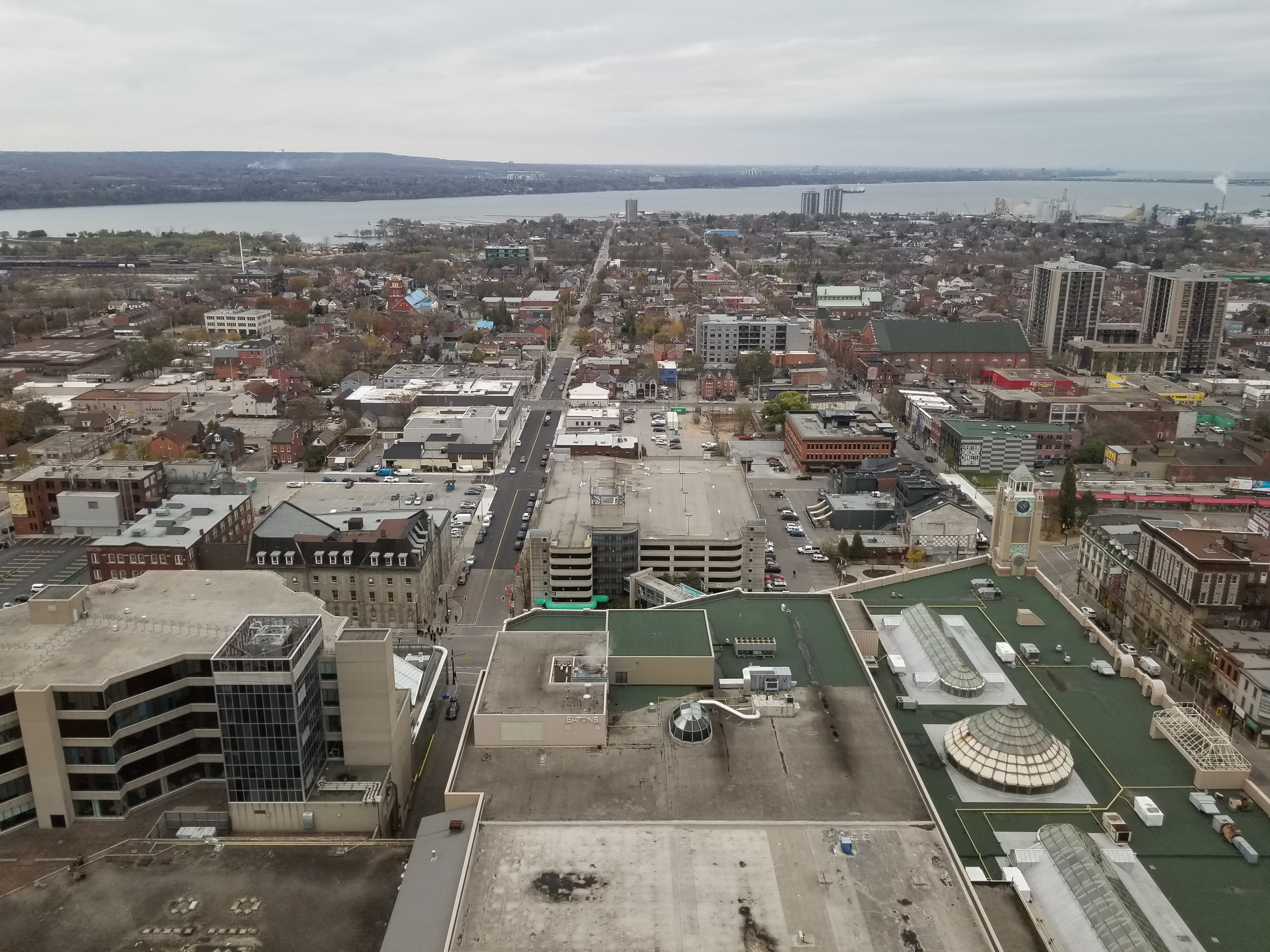
Looking North from the 24th floor of Stelco Tower. The Hamilton Harbour can be seen in the distance

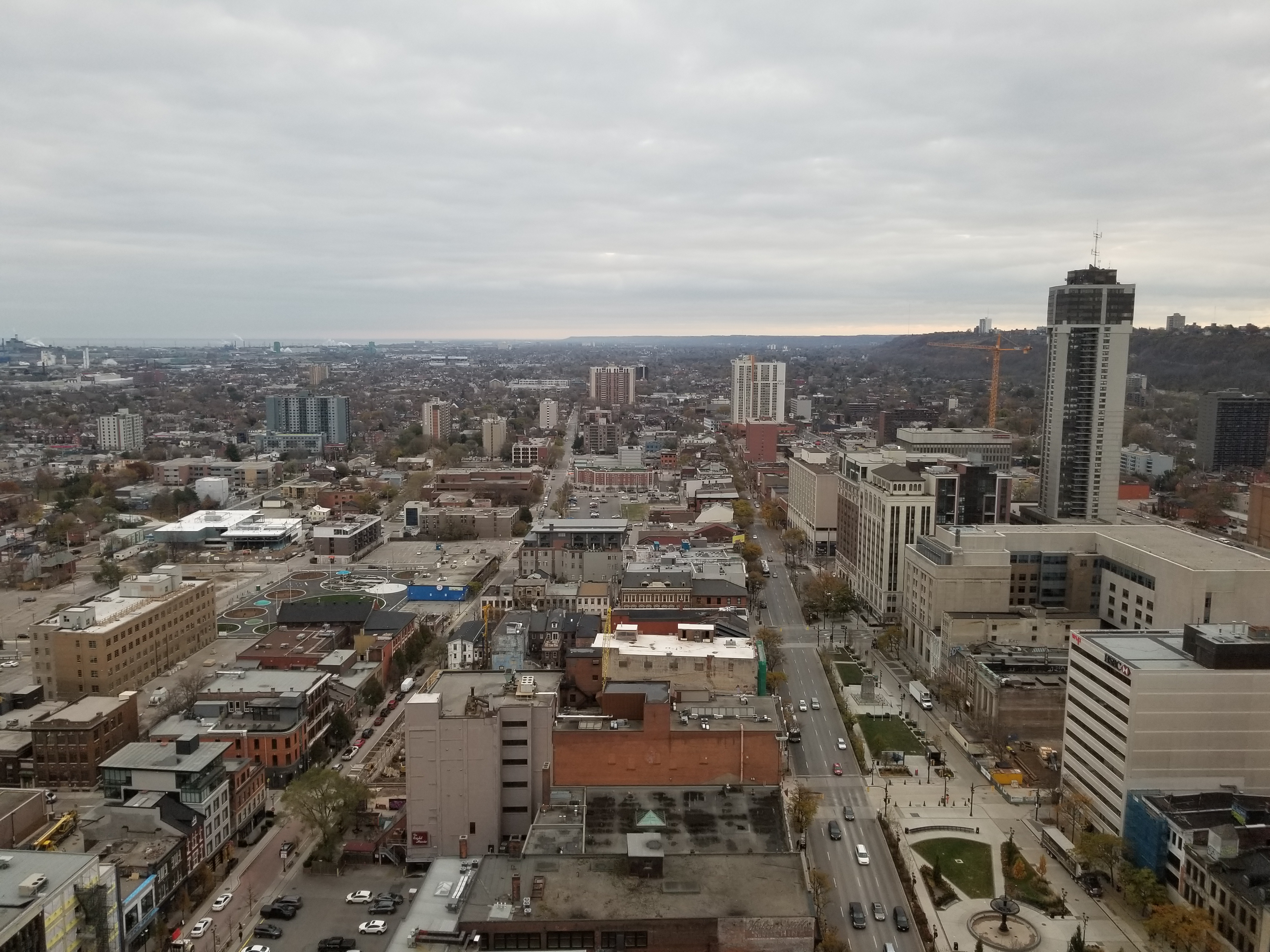
Looking East from the 24th floor of Stelco Tower. Landmark Place, Hamilton's tallest building, as well as the Niagara Escarpment can be seen to the right.

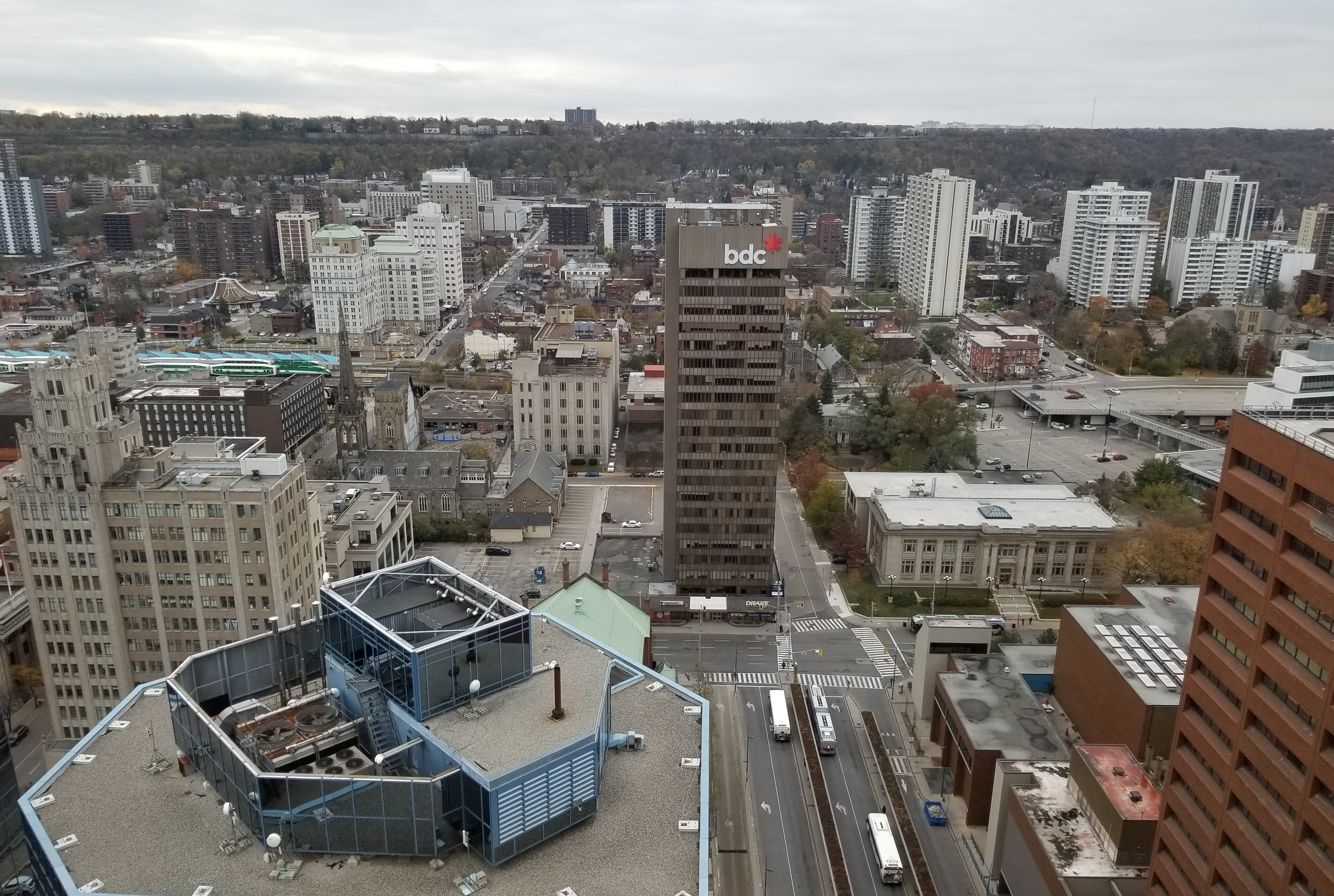
Looking South from the 24th floor of Stelco Tower. Commerce Place II can be seen in the bottom left, the BDC Building in the centre, and the Ellen Fairclough Building in the bottom right. The Niagara Escarpment can also be seen in the distance

== See also ==
- Lloyd D. Jackson Square
- 1 James Street North
- Robert Thomson Building
- 120 King Street West
- List of tallest buildings in Hamilton, Ontario
