= Robert Thomson Building =

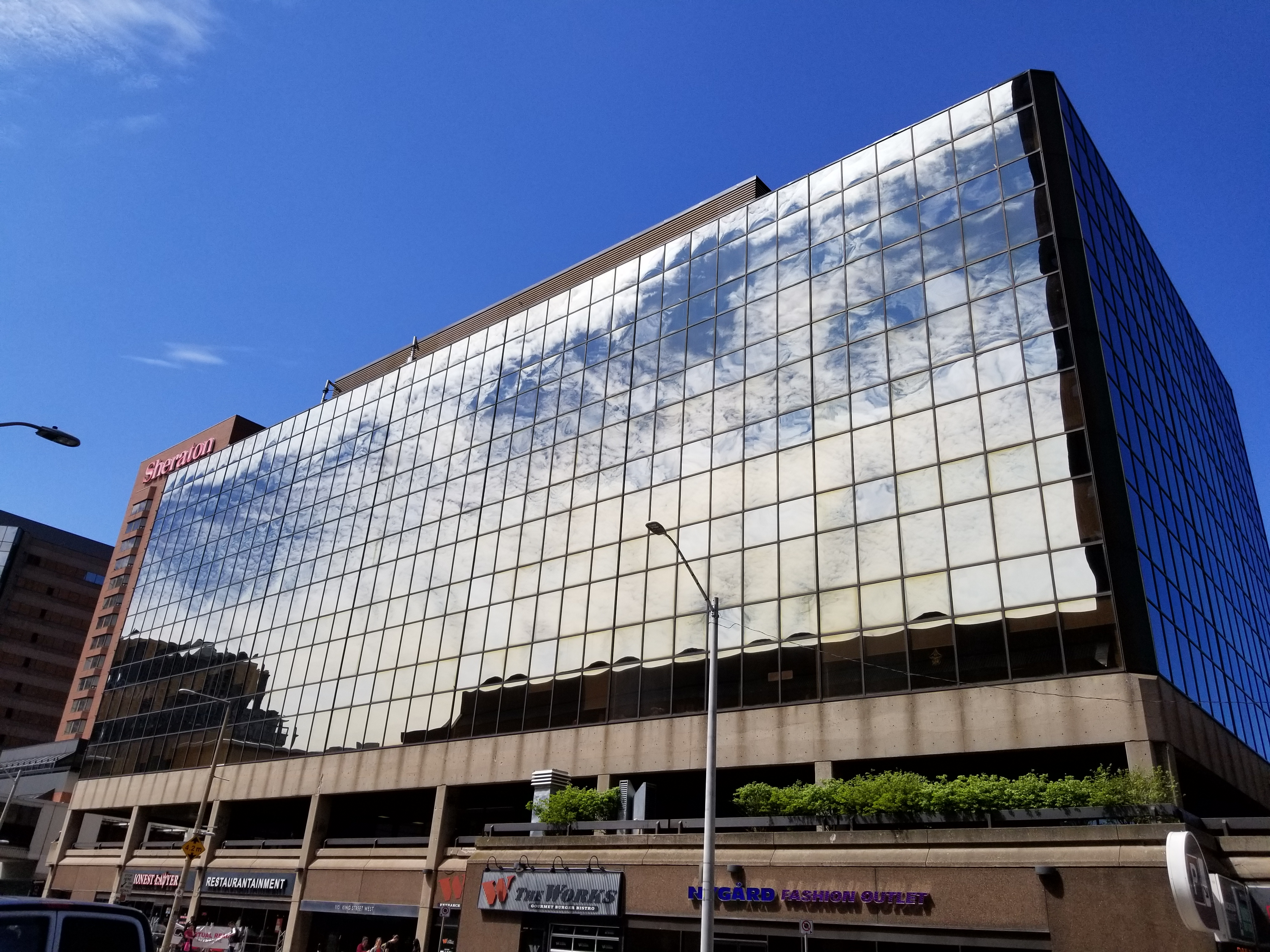
- Robert Thomson Building
- Interactive map of the Robert Thomson Building area

General information
- Type: Office
- Location: Hamilton, Ontario, Canada, 110 King Street West
- Coordinates: 43.25760°N 79.87145°W
- Completed: 1977; 49 years ago

Height
- Roof: 31 m (102 ft)

Technical details
- Floor count: 9
- Floor area: 20,500 sq ft per floor
- Lifts/elevators: 3

Design and construction
- Architect: Arthur C.F. Lau

The Robert Thomson Building is a 9-storey low-rise office building in Hamilton, Ontario, Canada. The building was completed in 1977, and is part of the Lloyd D. Jackson Square complex. The building is still officially known as the Robert Thomson Building, but some signage refers to the building by its address, 110 King Street West.

== Description ==
The building's facade consists of glass windows and a concrete base. The interior features a lobby with granite floors and concrete walls, a digital directory, and an elevator bank. The elevator bank features 3 modernized Otis elevators that serve floors 2 through 7, as well as the plaza level, with one of the elevators serving the underground parking lot, as well as the mechanical floor. The building also features escalators and stairs that lead from the main level (lobby and mall) to the plaza level. The plaza level of the Robert Thomson building extends farther north than floors 2 to 7, and is located above the centre portion of the Jackson Square mall. The building features column-free floor plates. The Jackson Square mall, as well as the 3 other office buildings in the complex are accessible from the lobby level. The building features a large common underground parking lot with a capacity of 1300 vehicles.

== Images ==
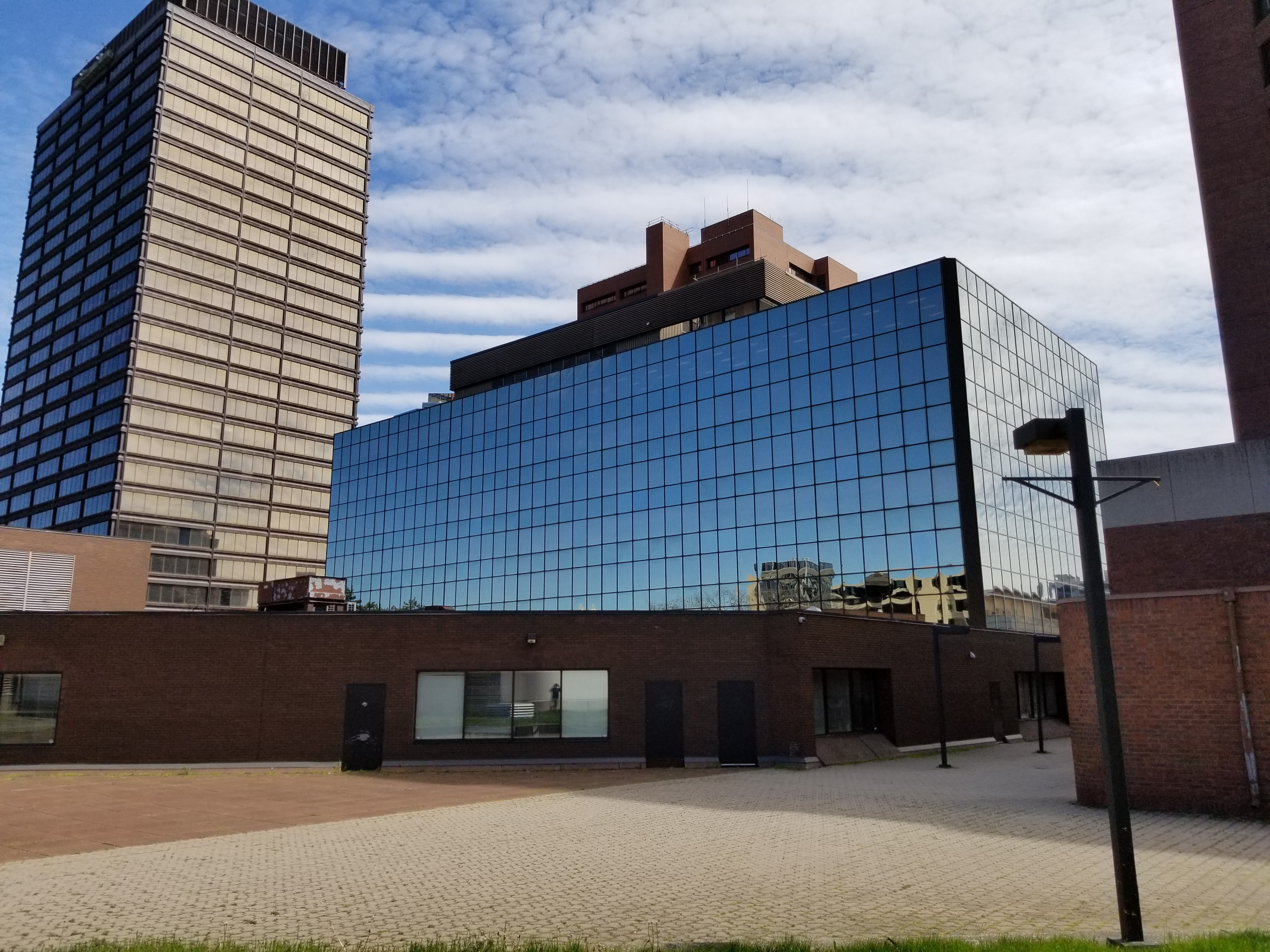
Robert Thomson Building viewed from the Jackson Square rooftop plaza

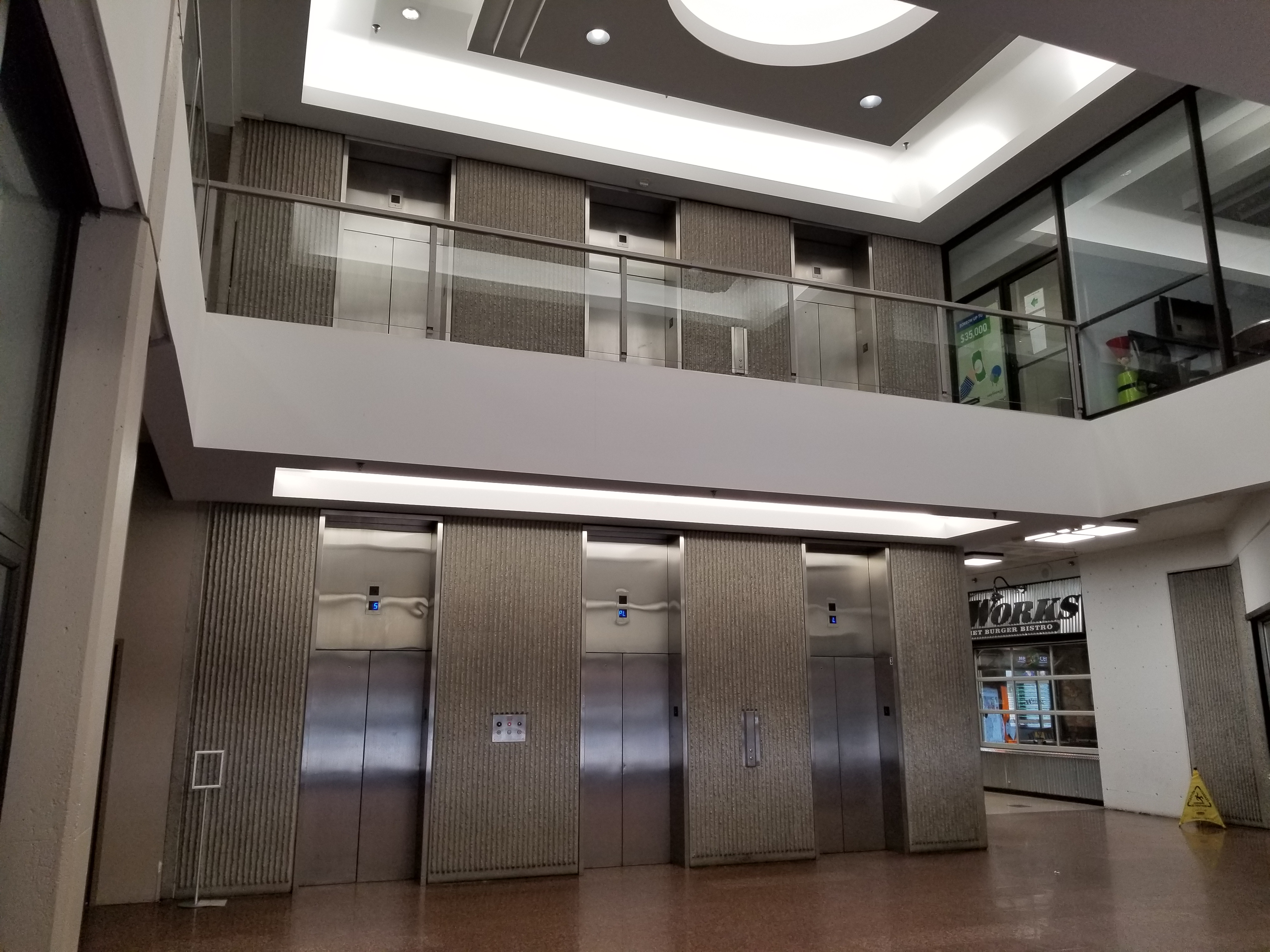
Robert Thomson Building lobby

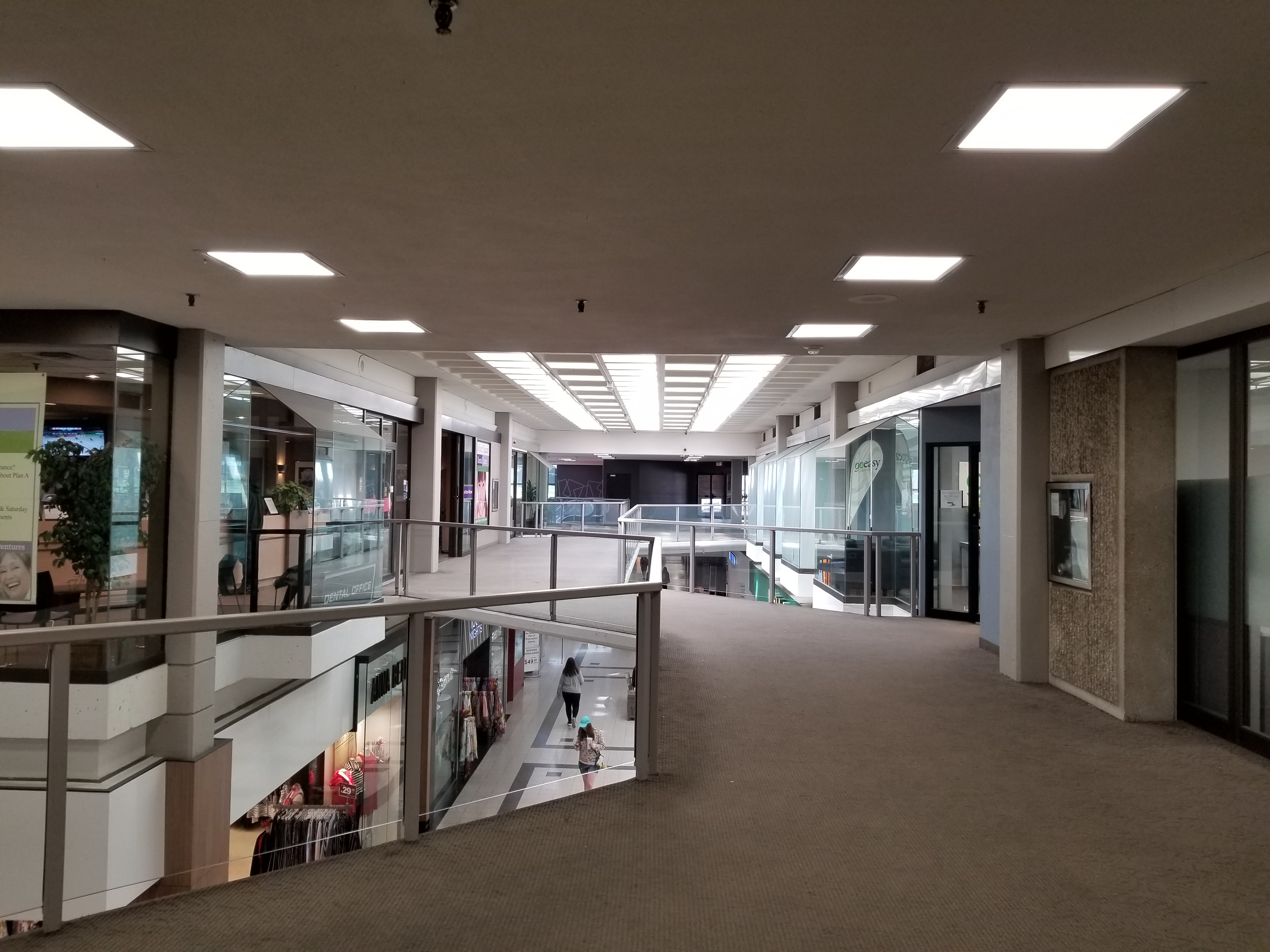
Robert Thomson Building plaza level

== See also ==
- Lloyd D. Jackson Square
- 100 King Street West
- 1 James Street North
- 120 King Street West
