= Standard Life (Canada) =

Canadian insurance company, 1833–2016

Standard Life Assurance Company of Canada
- Industry: Financial services
- Founded: 1833
- Defunct: 2016
- Fate: Became part of Manulife
- Headquarters: Montreal, Quebec, Canada
- Products: Insurance

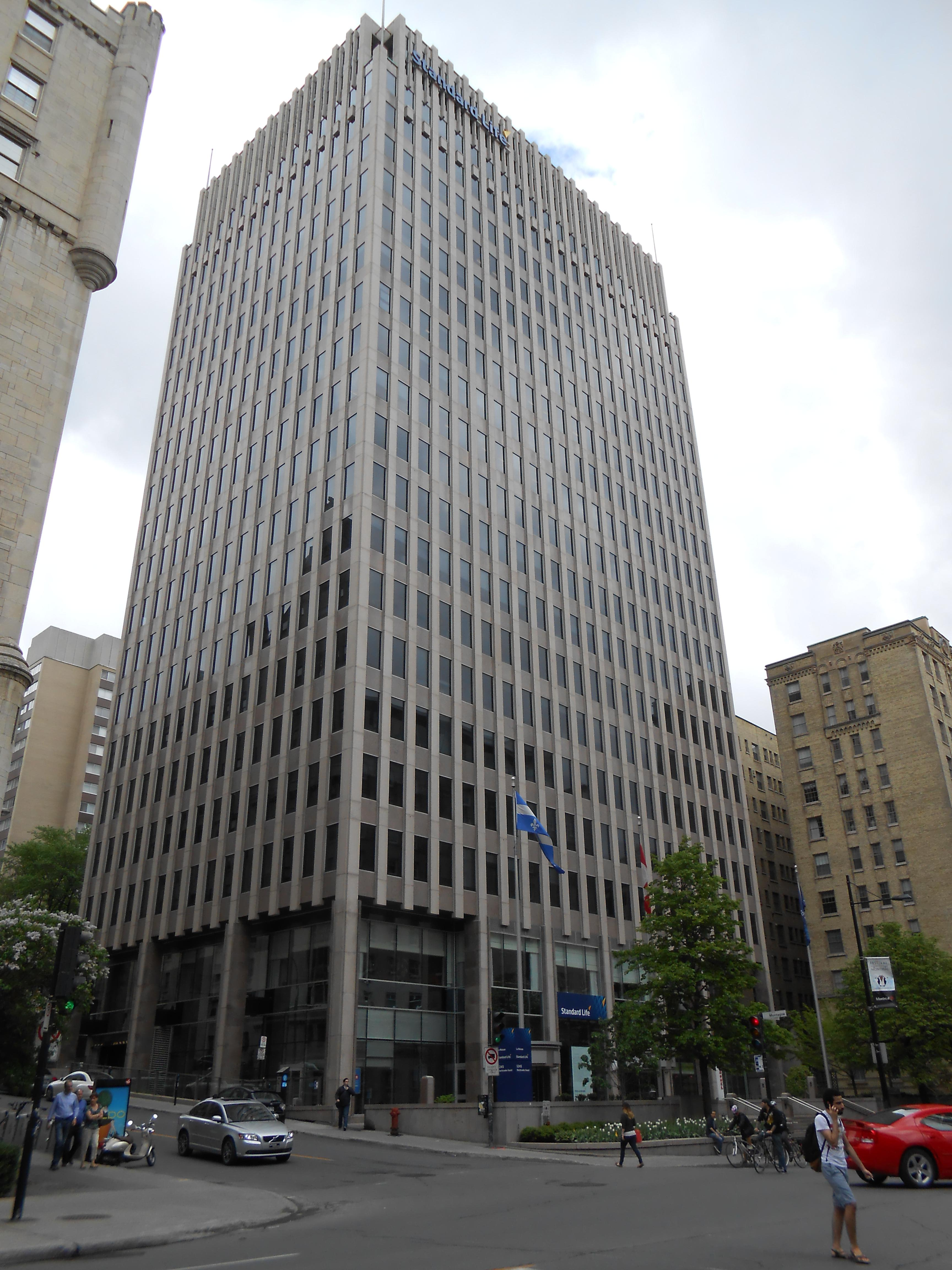
The 1962 Standard Life Building at 1245 Sherbrooke, designed by Durnford, Bolton, Chadwick & Ellwood

The Standard Life Assurance Company of Canada (also known as Standard Life) was an investment, retirement and financial protection company that is now part of Manulife.

== History ==
Standard Life first established a presence in Canada through John George Irvine, who took an agency in Quebec in 1834. Spencer Campbell Thomson, son of the manager of the Standard Life Assurance Company, visited Canada in 1882 and approved a new Canadian head office on St. James Street in Montreal.

On January 30, 2015, the Canadian operations of Standard Life plc joined Manulife.
