= Politics of Hamilton, Ontario =

Politics of Canadian city

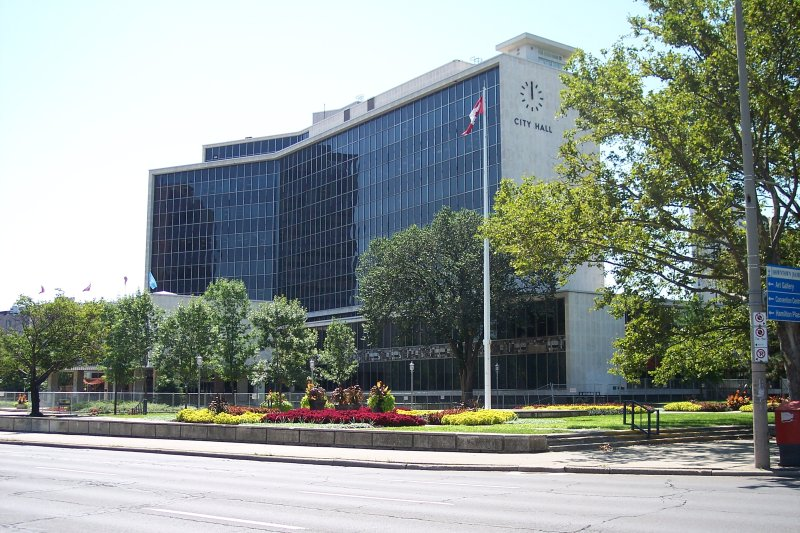
Hamilton City Hall

The politics of Hamilton, Ontario include municipal, provincial, and federal issues. Notable political issues in Hamilton include the controversial amalgamation of Hamilton with its suburbs in 2001, the destruction of green space around the Red Hill Valley to make way for the Red Hill Creek Expressway, and plans to build a Light Rail Transit line in the city.

== Municipal politics ==
The municipal politics of Hamilton, Ontario function within a framework council-manager government with considerable autonomy despite constitutionally-mandated oversight from the Government of Ontario. Hamilton's mayor is the ceremonial leader of council, with other councillors accepting the role of Deputy Mayor, and thus chair of council, on a rotating basis. The city elects members to its council independently of political parties, though many have strong ties to federal and provincial parties, as well as slates, which have historically been an important part of municipal elections. Hamilton's politics has been influenced by all major Canadian political parties and, to a certain extent, by the Communist/Labor-Progressive parties and smaller special interest groups.

Presently, Hamilton, Ontario City Council is composed of 15 councillors, elected from each of the city's wards and one mayor, elected in a citywide poll. The current composition of council has existed since 2000. The most recent election was held on Monday October, 24 2022.

In 1973, the City of Hamilton and the towns of Flamborough, Ancaster, Dundas, Glanbrook, and Stoney Creek were merged into the Region of Hamilton-Wentworth by the government of Bill Davis. The creation of the region sparked a special municipal election that deviated from the two-year terms that Hamilton City Council had observed from 1954. Following the region's establishment, Hamilton's city council was composed of two aldermen from each of the city's eight wards and a mayor, elected in a citywide poll. Hamiltonians were also represented at regional council by the mayor, Board of Control, and one aldermen from each ward, whereas other municipalities in the region were represented by their mayors and an additional regional councillor. Until 1988, the regional chair was appointed by the Ontario government, after which the position was elected in a region-wide poll until the council was dissolved in 2000.

When the city was incorporated in 1846, two aldermen were elected from each of the city's five original wards. The wards constituted the city's original Gore District settlement, and were divided by major streets:

- St. George's – from Paradise Road to John Street, south of King Street to the Niagara Escarpment
- St. Patrick's – from John Street to Emerald Street, south of King Street to the Niagara Escarpment
- St. Lawrence – from Emerald Street to John Street, north of King Street to Hamilton Harbour
- St. Andrew's – from John Street to MacNab Street, north of King Street to Hamilton Harbour
- St. Mary's – from MacNab Street to Paradise Road, north of King Street to Hamilton Harbour

In 1875, the city's growth necessitated the establishment of a new ward, which was done in conjunction with abandoning named wards in favour of numbered divisions. Ward Seven was added in 1881, and Ward Eight was formed in 1910. Though the location and population of each ward would change, the city would retain the same number of wards for 90 years, until amalgamation in 2000.

Hamilton's mayors have been politically diverse, ranging from left-wing trade unionists to Conservative Members of Parliament. From 1943 to 1949, Hamilton's mayor was Sam Lawrence, a stonecutter and prominent member of the Cooperative Commonwealth Federation who is affectionately referred to as Hamilton's 'Labour Mayor'. In a testament to Hamilton's political diversity, prior to Lawrence's election, the city's preceding mayor, William Morrison, had been a Conservative MPP and his predecessor, Herbert Wilton, sat as a federal Conservative MP.

Hamilton's working-class neighbourhoods elected prominent members of the Communist Party and its legal entity during the sixteen years it was outlawed, the Labor-Progressive Party, during the 1930s and 1940s. Ward Seven, which, until 1950, was the area between Sherman Avenue and Ottawa Street, north of King Street to Hamilton Harbour, elected party activists Harry Hunter (1938–1940, 1942–1944), Helen Anderson Coulson (1944–1946) and Peter Dunlop (1946–1949).

== Provincial politics ==
Hamilton provincial election results
Year	PC		New Democratic		Liberal		Green	
2022	33%	62,335	37%	69,746	18%	33,664	6%	11,015
2018	31%	70,948	48%	112,341	14%	32,363	5%	10,895

Hamilton has traditionally been represented by four to six Members of Provincial Parliament (MPPs) or Members of the Legislative Assembly (MLAs) in the Legislative Assembly of Ontario.

== Federal politics ==
Hamilton federal election results
Year	Liberal		Conservative		New Democratic		Green	
2021	36%	95,042	28%	74,503	27%	70,400	2%	6,014
2019	37%	101,909	27%	74,781	28%	76,282	7%	17,990

Progressive Conservative Prime Minister John Diefenbaker appointed the late Ellen Fairclough as Secretary of State, making her Canada's first female cabinet minister, in 1957. A downtown provincial office building is named in her honour.

John Munro, a Trudeau-era Liberal cabinet minister and husband of Lily Munro, came in fourth in the first mayoral election for amalgamated Hamilton. The Hamilton International Airport was renamed in his honour.

Progressive Conservative Prime Minister Joe Clark appointed Lincoln "Linc" Alexander, the first Black Canadian Member of Parliament, as Minister of Labour in his short-lived government. Alexander later became Lieutenant Governor of Ontario, another first for blacks in Ontario and Canada. Linc was honoured by having the Mountain east-west expressway named after him.

Sheila Copps, daughter of Victor and Geraldine, was a Liberal candidate, first for the Ontario legislature and then for the House of Commons, where she represented Hamilton East from 1984 until 2004. She was a leading member of the Liberal "Rat Pack" while the Liberals were in opposition until 1993. An early and strong supporter of the leadership of Jean Chrétien, she held several posts during her career including Deputy Prime Minister. After Paul Martin became prime minister, however, Copps lost her nomination campaign to Tony Valeri in her re-districted riding.

In the 2006, 2008 and 2011 federal elections, all three of Hamilton's main urban ridings were won by New Democrats Wayne Marston, David Christopherson and Chris Charlton. In those same elections, Hamilton's two predominantly rural ridings were both won by Conservatives David Sweet and Dean Allison.
