= Olympia Apartments =

Olympia Apartments may refer to:

in Canada

- Olympia Apartments (Hamilton, Ontario)

in the United States

- Olympia Apartments (Washington, D.C.), listed on the NRHP in Washington, D.C.
