= BDC Building =

Building in Hamilton, Ontario

Coordinates: 43.255551°N 79.871060°W

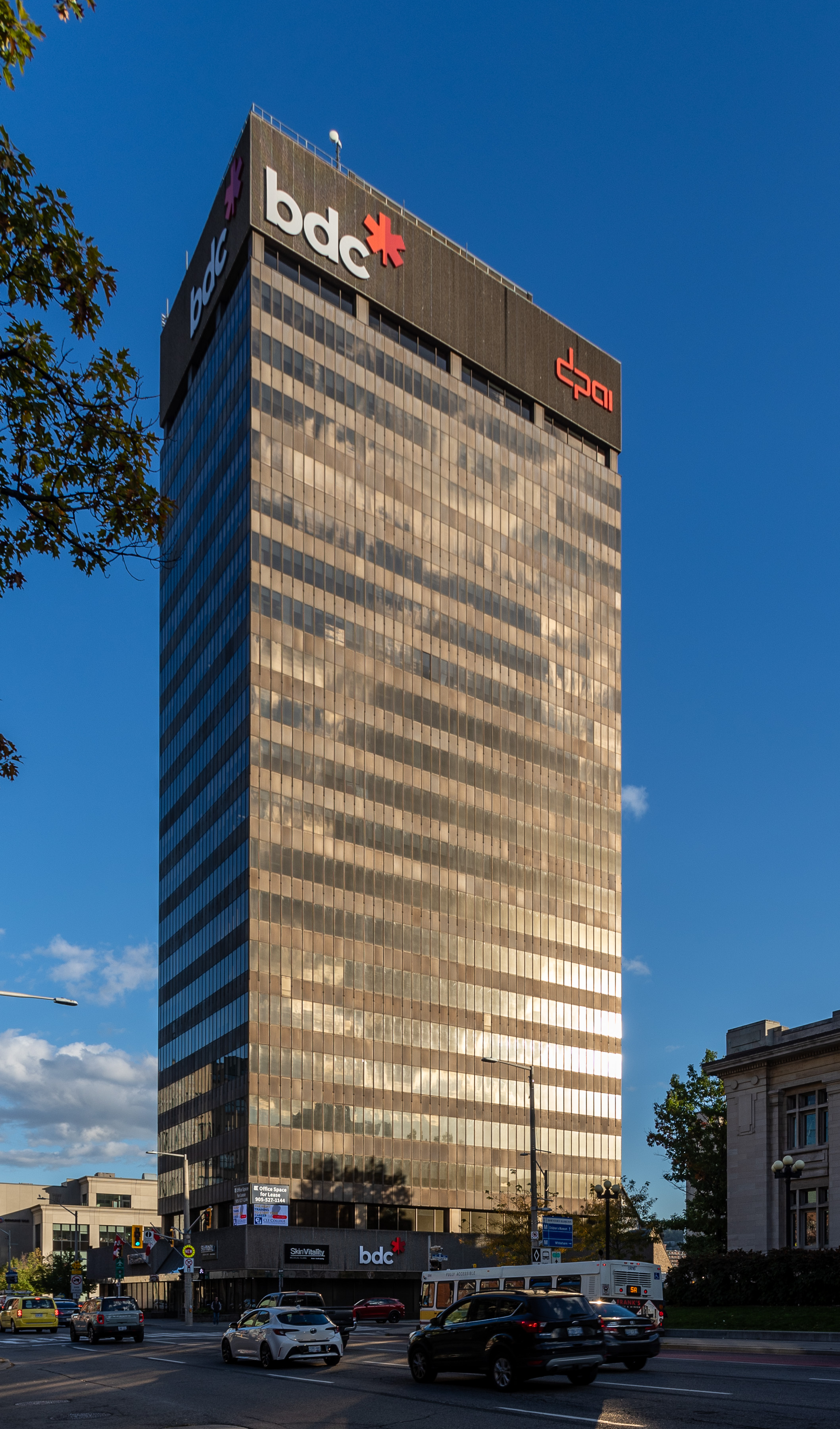

General information
- Location: Hamilton, Ontario, 25 Main Street West
- Groundbreaking: August 1969
- Opened: 29 March 1971

Height
- Roof: 91 metres (299 ft)

Technical details
- Floor count: 22

Design and construction
- Architecture firm: Roscoe, MacIver & Stienstra

The BDC Building, 22-storey office tower (91.5 m), is the 6th tallest building in Hamilton, Ontario, Canada. Originally the building was known as the IBM Building when it first opened in 1972. The "BDC" stands for the Business Development Bank of Canada. It stands on the corners of Main Street West and MacNab Street South.

== History and design ==
Plans for the building were announced on 5 August 1969, and the sod was turned that same week. The building was constructed by Cutaia Investments Limited, a development firm founded and operated by brothers Angelo (1929–1981), Nicholas (1928–2016), and Richard Cutaia (1921–2000). The brothers constructed their first building, the Professional Arts Building, in 1959 at 155 James Street South on the site of their father's grocery store. The expected completion date was late 1970, however, this would end up being delayed to the spring of 1971. Other projects by the Cutaias included Alexandra Square and the Undermount Building.

The building was designed by the firm Roscoe MacIver & Stienstra. The first was led by Stanley Maurice Roscoe (1921–2010), who is remembered best for his design of the new Hamilton City Hall in 1960.

On 5 November 1970, Mayor Victor Copps led the topping off ceremony. Following the ceremony, a formal reception was held on the building's seventh floor, where civic officials and guests had champagne and caviar. On Friday, 26 March 1971, IBM began moving into the building, and opened its office the following Monday.

The BDC is a financial institution wholly owned by the government of Canada. BDC plays a leadership role in delivering financing and consulting services to Canadian small business, with a particular focus on technology and exporting. The BDC has 80 branches and its operating structure is divided up into 21 key market areas across the country. The BDC head office is in Montreal.

== Images ==
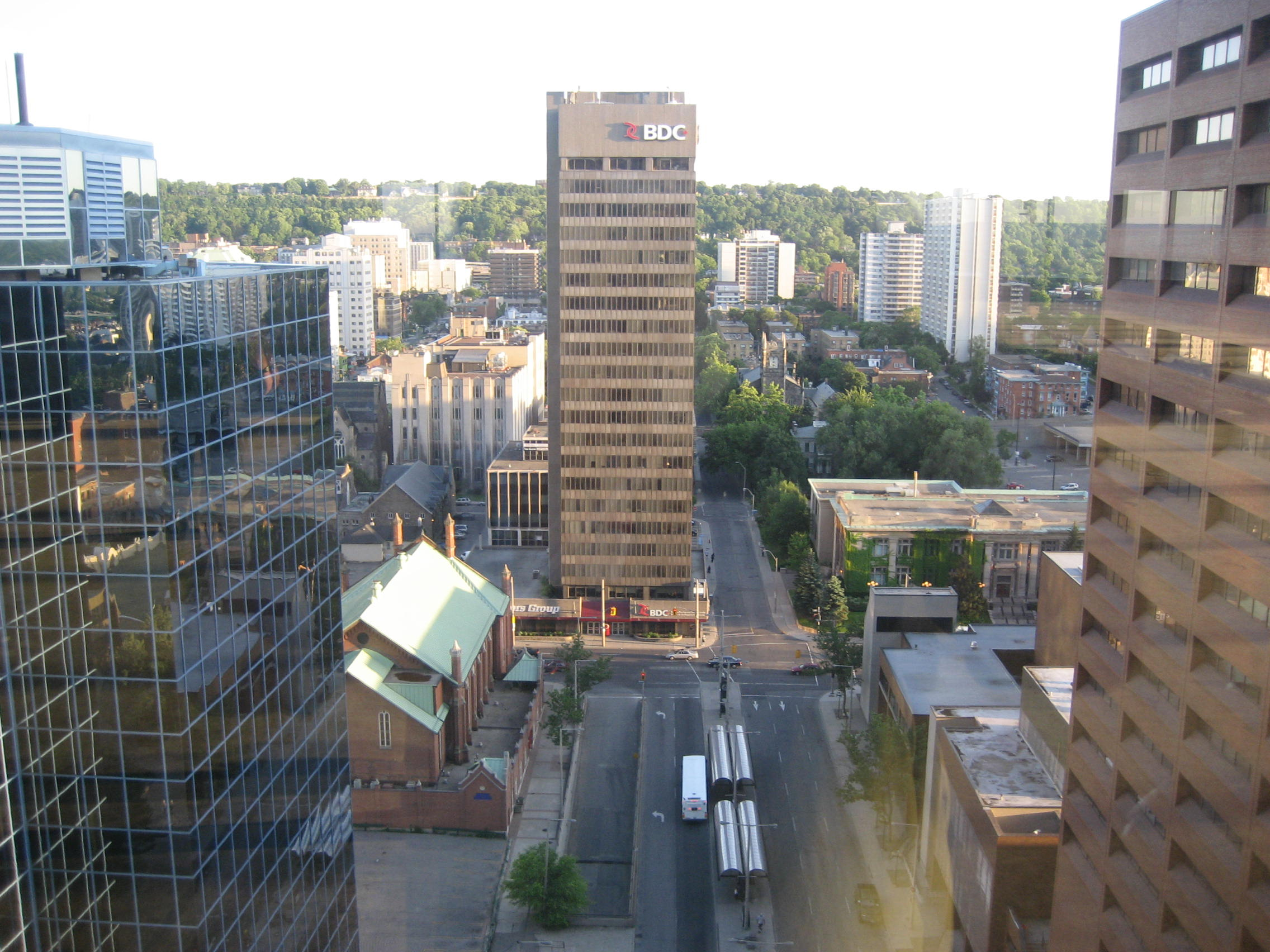
BDC Building, view from atop of Stelco Tower

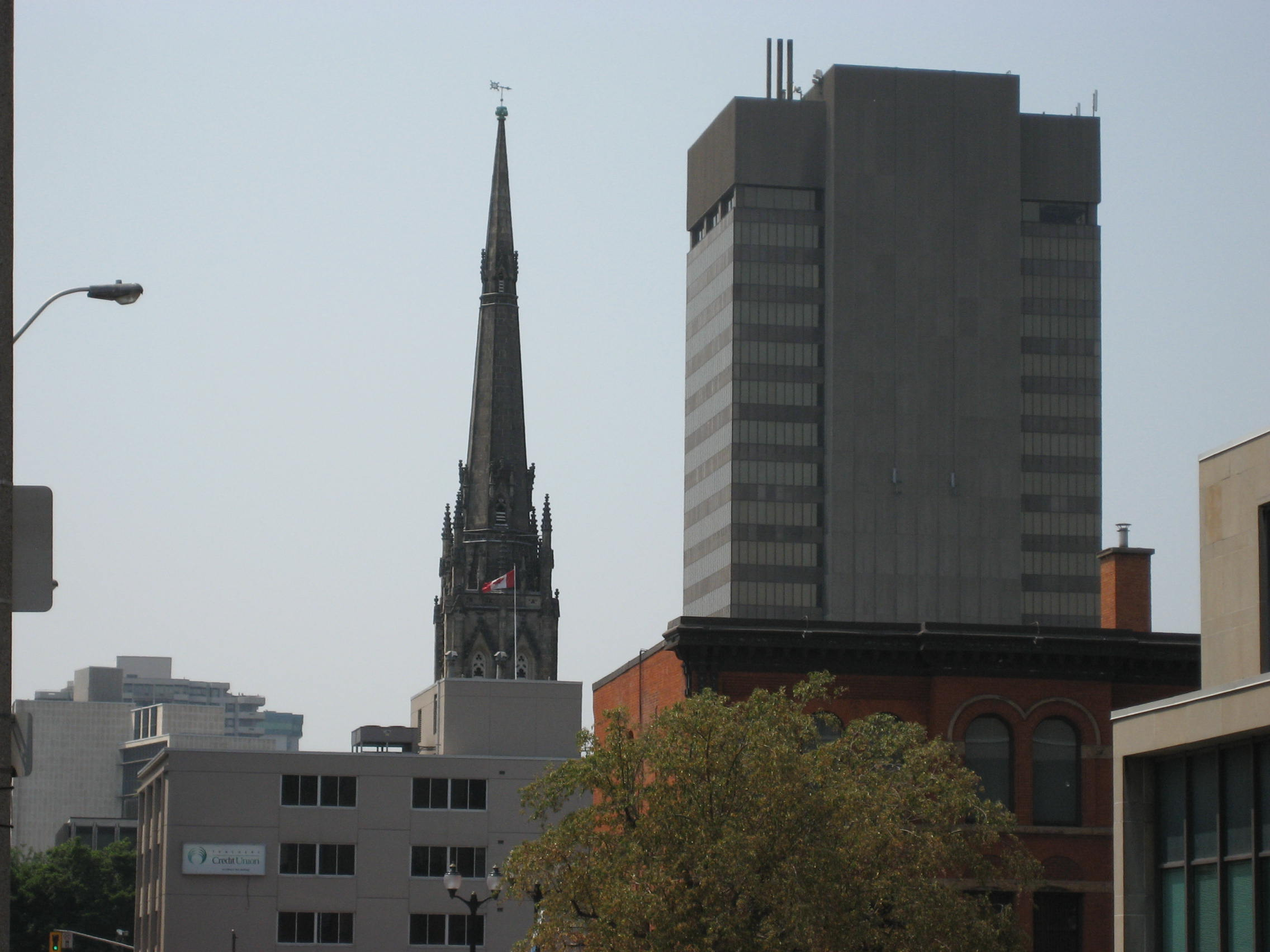
B.D.C. Building

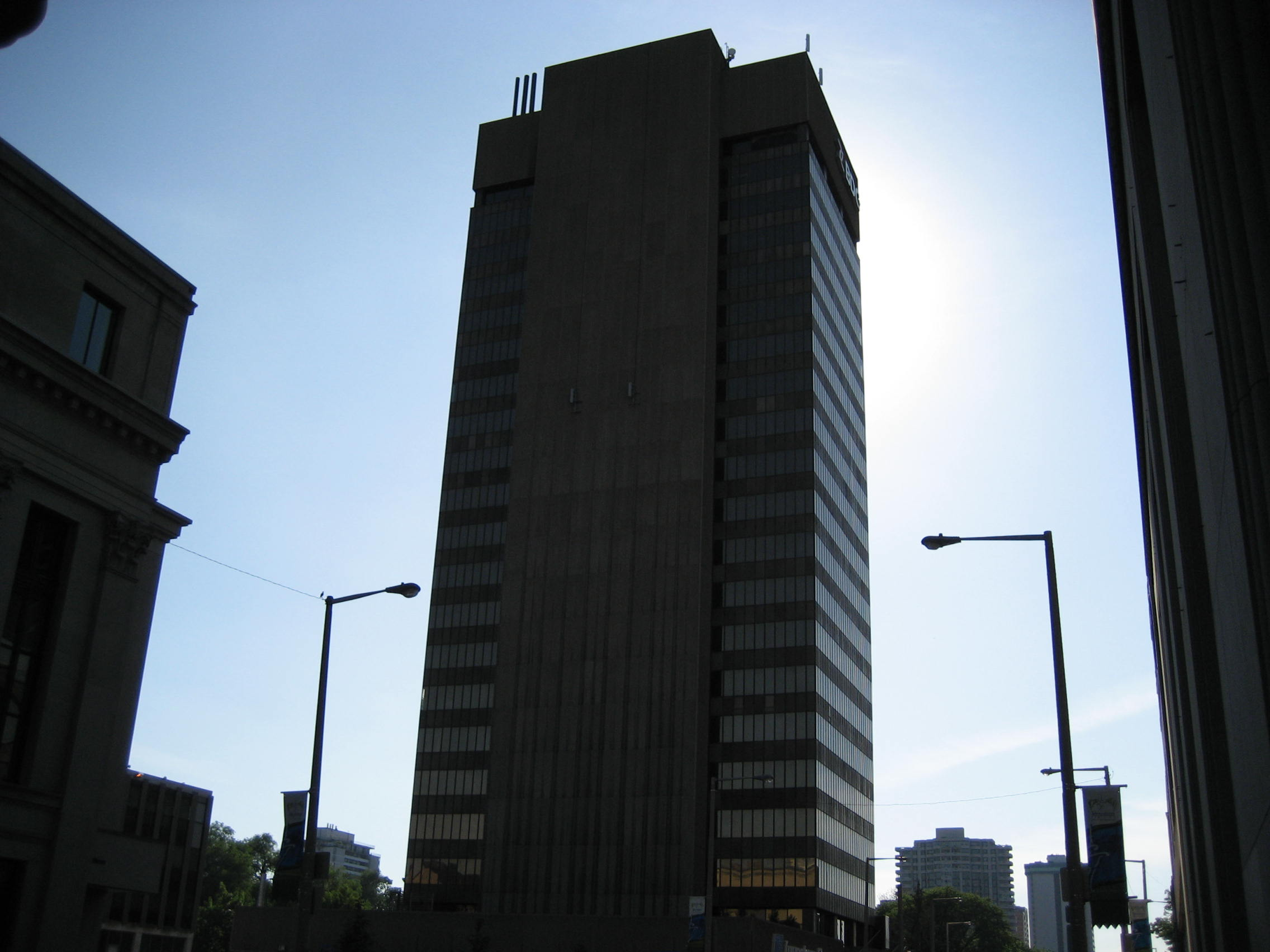
B.D.C. Building, Main Street West

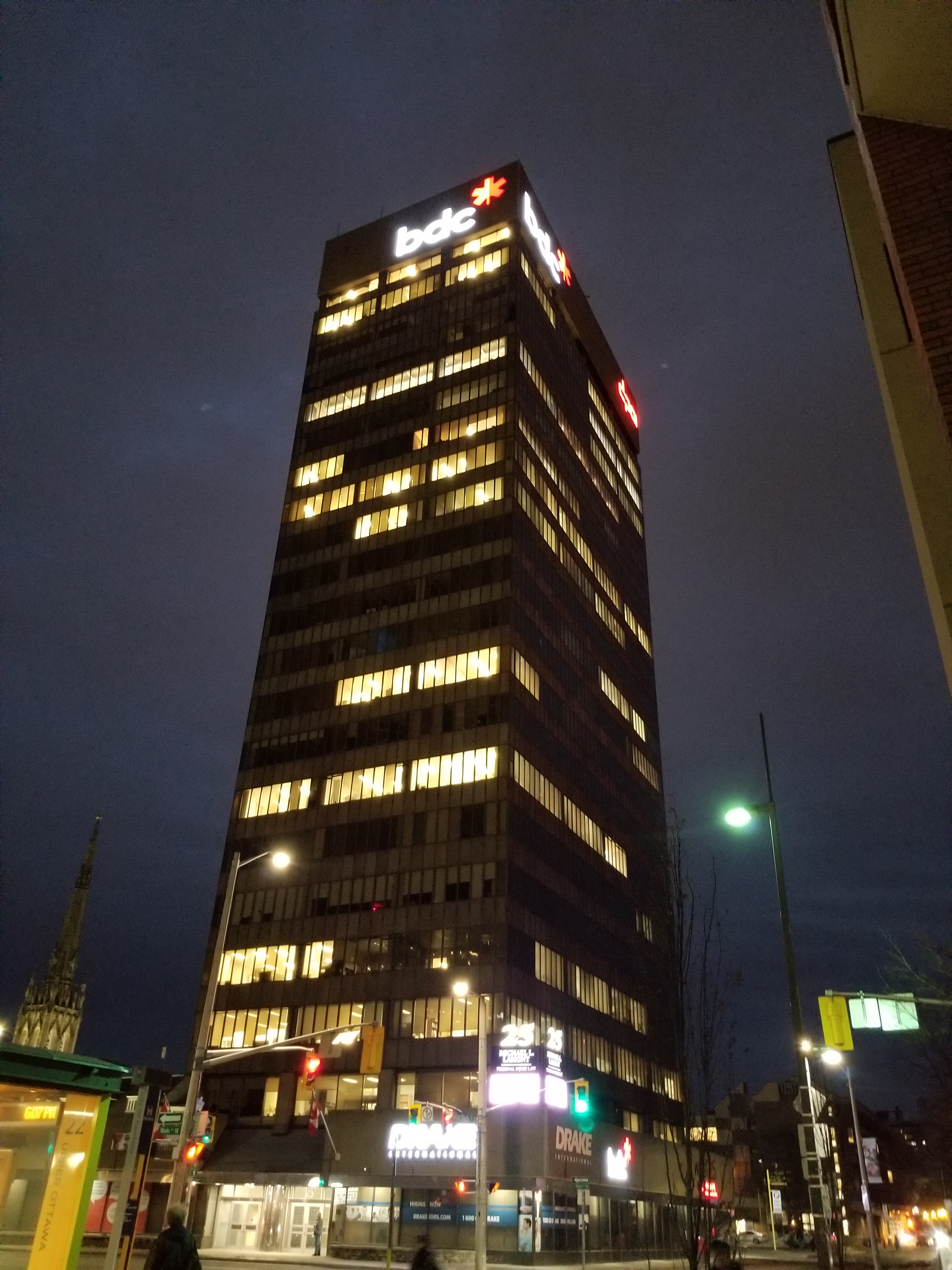
BDC Building at dusk

== See also ==
- List of tallest buildings in Hamilton, Ontario
