= MacNab Street (Hamilton, Ontario) =

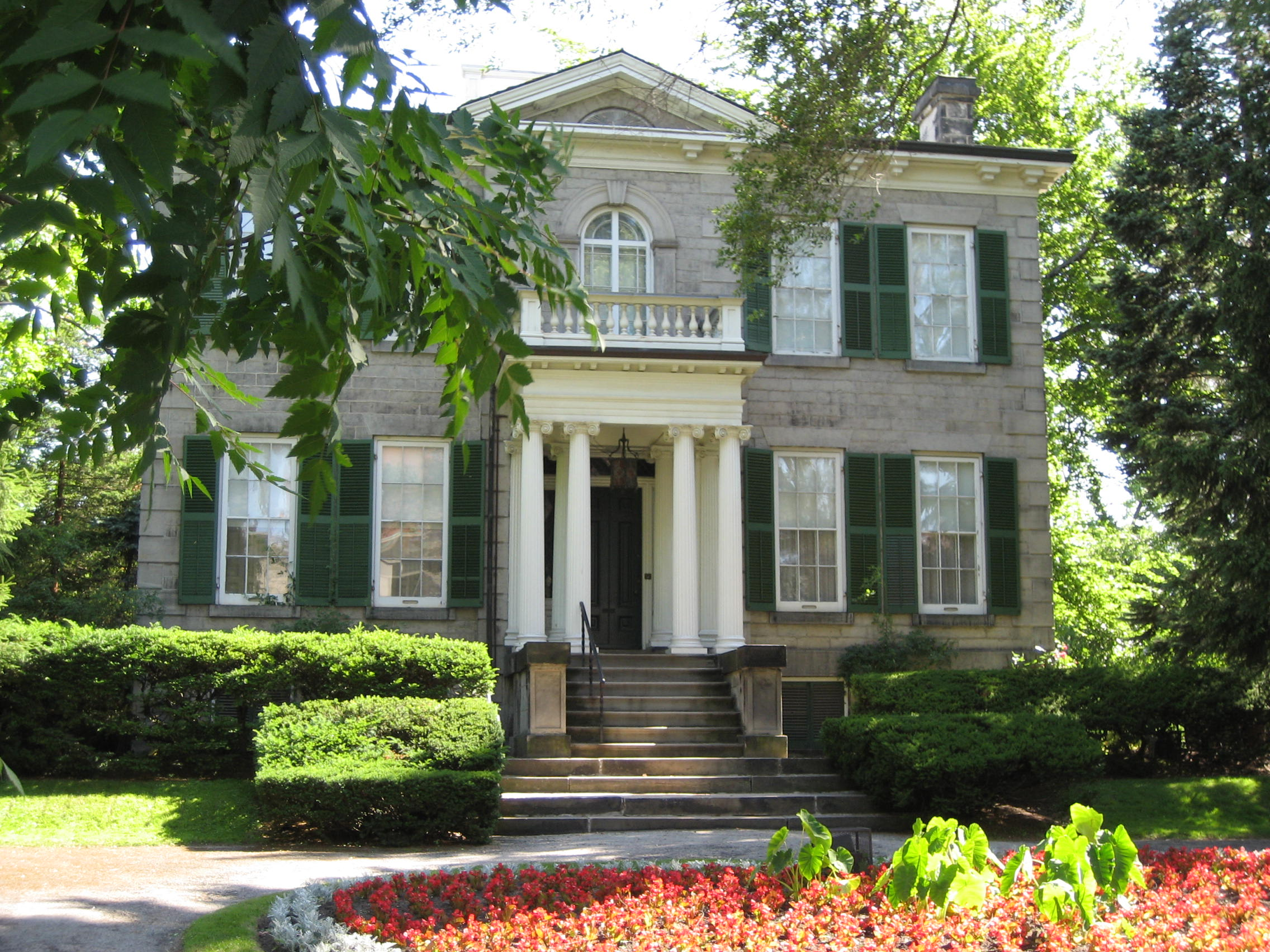
Whitehern Museum

MacNab Street is a Lower City collector road in Hamilton, Ontario, Canada. It starts in the Durand neighbourhood on Markland Street, as a one-way street going north to Bold Street, where it becomes two-way for one block until Hurst Place where it's cut off by a wall for the Hunter Street railway bridge. Pedestrians may cross Hunter Street at an underpass. MacNab Street starts again north of the Railway line on Hunter Street as a two-way street but is cut off again at King Street where the Lloyd D. Jackson Square mall and Stelco Tower are situated. MacNab Street continues north of this Mall on York Boulevard, in front of the Hamilton Public Library & the entrance to the Hamilton Farmer's Market, again as a two-way street right through the city's North End to Burlington Street. It continues as a one-way street to the waterfront where it ends at Guise Street West, the site of the Royal Hamilton Yacht Club and Pier 5.

== History ==
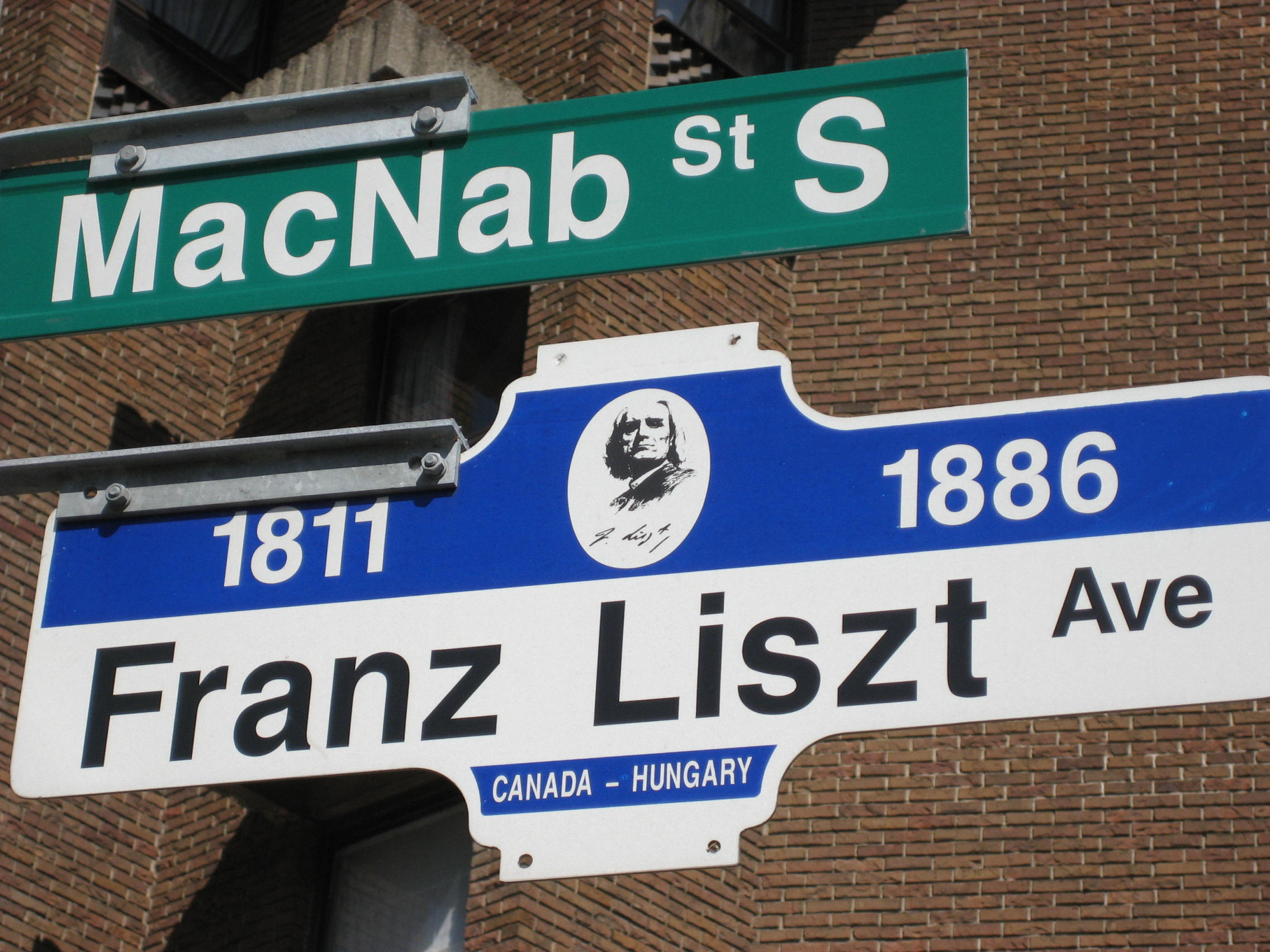

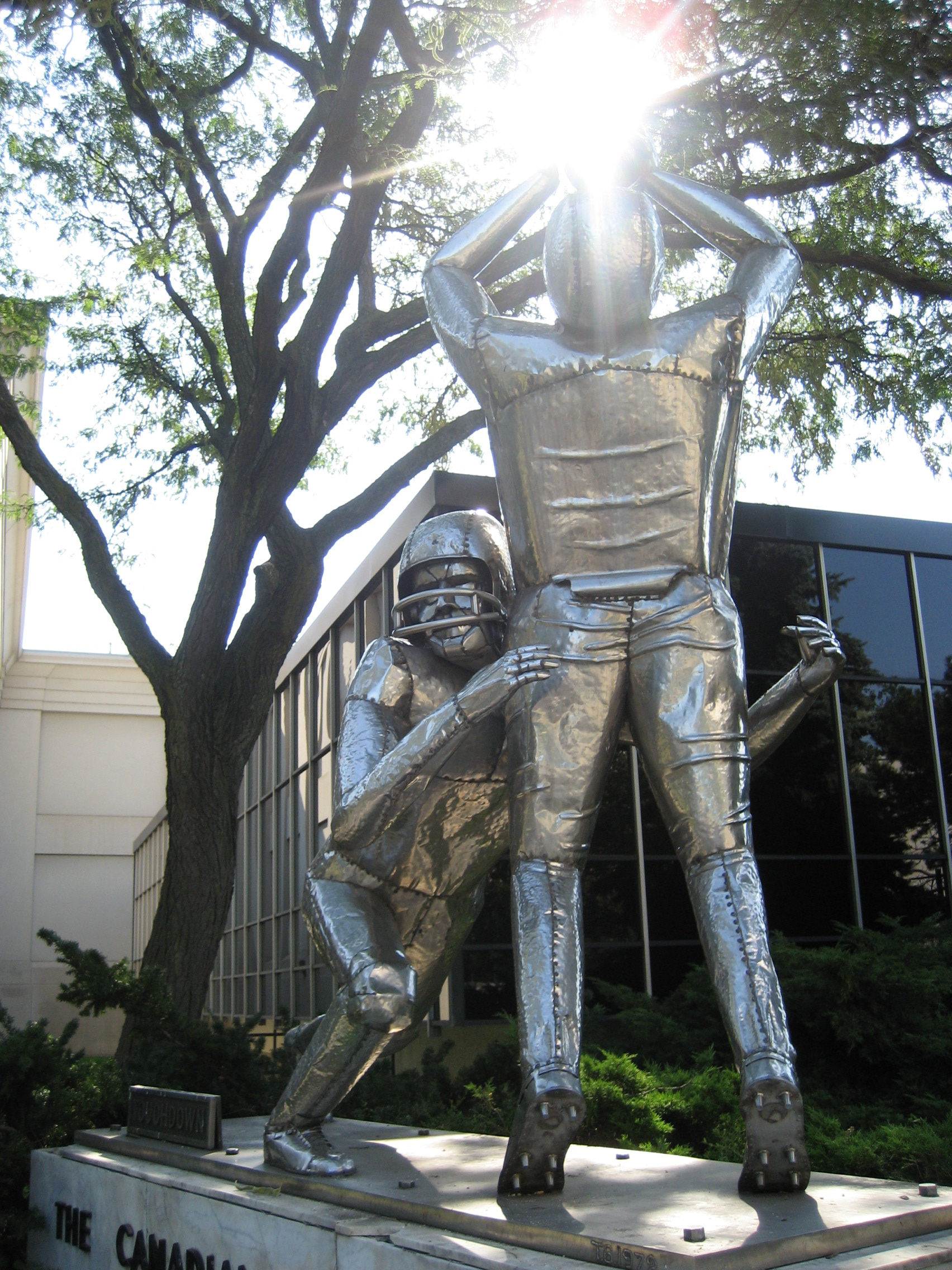
Canadian Football Hall of Fame museum

MacNab Street was named after Allan MacNab, (1798–1862), Sir Allan Napier MacNab soldier, lawyer, businessman, knight and former Prime Minister of Upper Canada. MacNab Street South between King Street and Hunter Street West is also named Franz Liszt Avenue, named after the Hungarian composer/ conductor/ pianist.

In 1838, St. Mary's Roman Catholic Church on Park Street (1-block West of MacNab) was built. Recently given a complete paint job on the outside and additions added in the South-east of property, (Banquet Hall), and a parking lot done in red gravel. The building is architecturally notable both inside & out.

In 1958, Conway Twitty, singer-songwriter and his band were in town and were playing the Flamingo Lounge where Hamilton Place auditorium is located today. Legend has it that the drummer, Jack Nance, wrote "It's Only Make Believe" between sets, although another story puts them at the nearby Fischer Hotel. The song was recorded in 1958 and became the first of nine Top 40 hits for Twitty, selling eight million copies.

Thomas McQuesten's, historic downtown family home was willed to the City after the death of the last of his five unmarried siblings in 1968. After its restoration was complete in 1971, Whitehern has been open as a civic museum and has occasionally served as a period film location.

100 King Street West (formerly Stelco Tower) was built in 1972 in downtown Hamilton, 26-floors/ 103-metres. At the time of completion was the tallest building in Hamilton but that title lasted less than 2 years until Landmark Place, 43-floors/ 127 meters, (originally known as The Century 21 Building) was complete in 1974.

Hamilton is also home to the Canadian Football Hall of Fame museum. The museum hosts an annual induction event in a week-long celebration that includes school visits, a golf tournament, a formal induction dinner and concludes with the Hall of Fame game involving the local CFL Hamilton Tiger-Cats at Ivor Wynne Stadium.

The Waterfront Shuttle is a free service offered by the Hamilton Street Railway. It has a seasonal schedule that runs weekends from May-to-October connecting Hamilton's downtown core to the waterfront and attractions that can be found there like HMCS Haida and the Parks Canada Discovery Centre.

== Frank A. Cooke Transit Terminal ==
Frank A. Cooke Transit Terminal
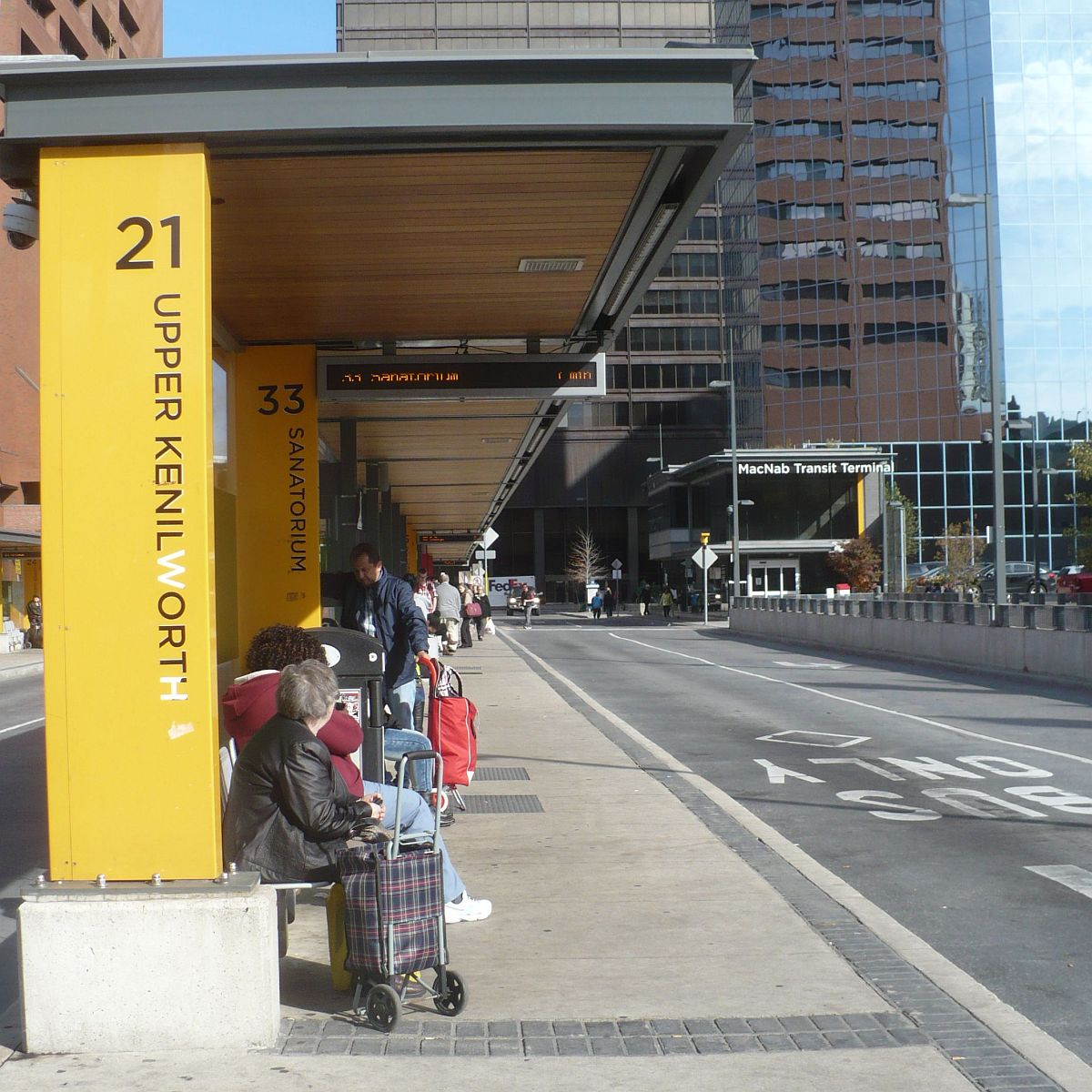

General information
- Location: Hamilton, Ontario; Canada
- Coordinates: 43°15′23″N 79°52′15″W
- Owner: City of Hamilton
- Platforms: 9
- Bus operators: Hamilton Street Railway

Construction
- Structure type: At-grade
- Accessible: Yes

History
- Closed: 2009-2011
- Rebuilt: 2011
- Former names: MacNab Transit Terminal (1969–2022)
Location

The Hamilton Street Railway bus terminal is located between King St W and Main St W, on a section of the street closed to traffic. Once a through street north of King Street, the demolition of buildings for Jackson Square would give rise to an on street transit terminal after 1969. The pre-2011 terminal had seven platforms with ten routes, mostly serving the upper part of the city. The 9 platform terminal was rebuilt and re-opened on 2 January 2011. Formerly known as MacNab Transit Terminal, the terminal was renamed to the Frank A. Cooke Transit Terminal on September 12, 2022 in honor of Franklin Arthur Cooke, the former general manager of HSR from 1946 to 1985.

== Hamilton Waterfront Trolley ==
The Hamilton Waterfront Trolley is a narrated tour along the 12 kilometre Hamilton Waterfront Trail. The main stop and departure spot is at the Hamilton Waterfront SCOOPS Ice Cream parlour, which provides the famous Stoney Creek Dairy Ice Cream. There are a dozen stops along the way between Princess Point at the western-end of the route to the eastern-end, the site of HMCS Haida. Also near this eastern-end route is the site of the Hamiltonian Tour Boat, which is a 12-passenger tour boat that offers a leisurely guided tour of Hamilton Harbour with the captain providing interesting stories and history of one of North America's most noteworthy harbours. In addition to this there is also the Hamilton Harbour Queen Cruises which is another ship that offers 3-hour tour of the harbour along with Lunch, Dinner or other special events like Dance parties. This Harbour Queen Cruise was also the 2005 winner of the Hamilton Tourism Awards for "best tourism idea."

== Gallery ==
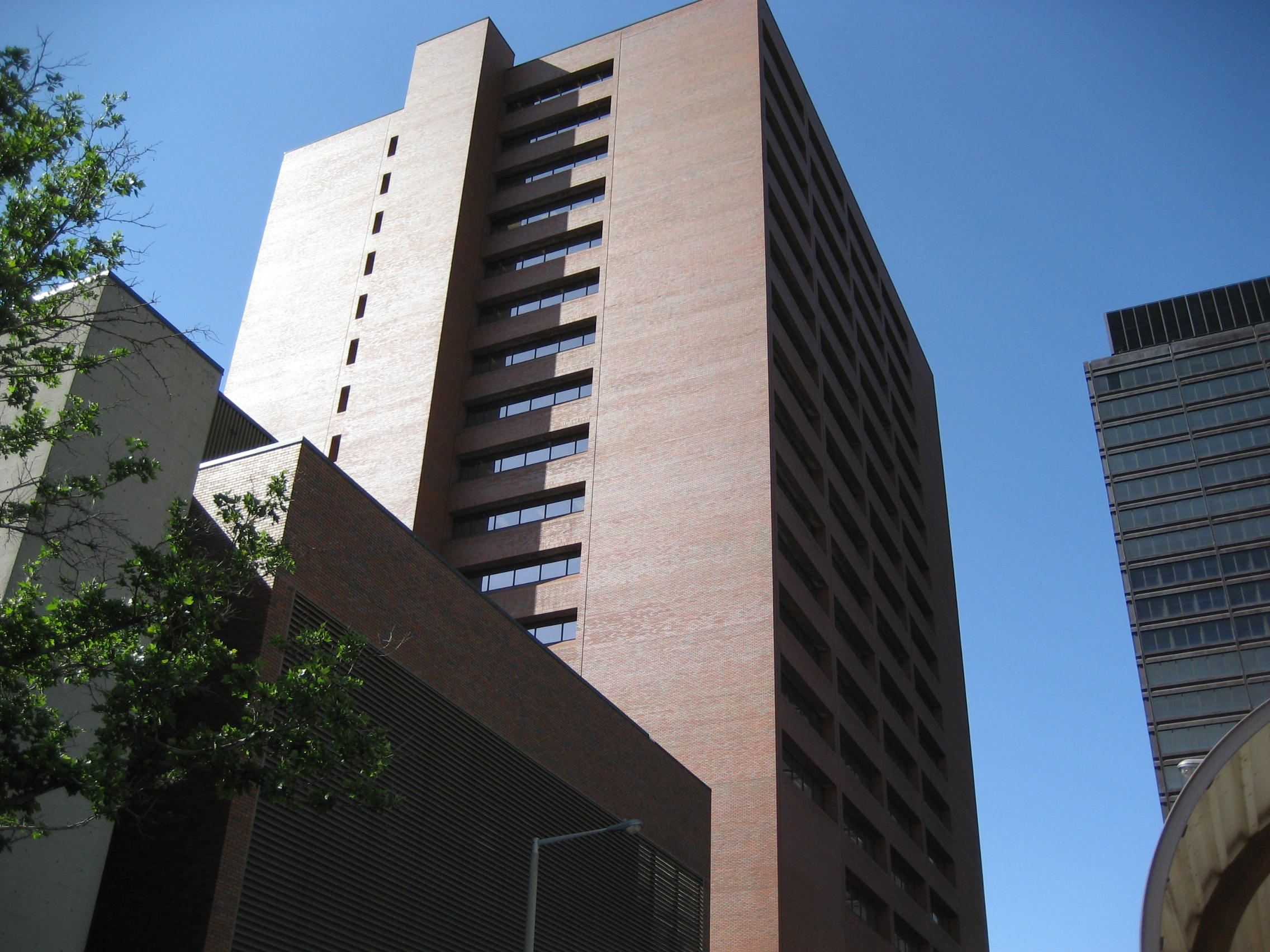
Ellen Fairclough building

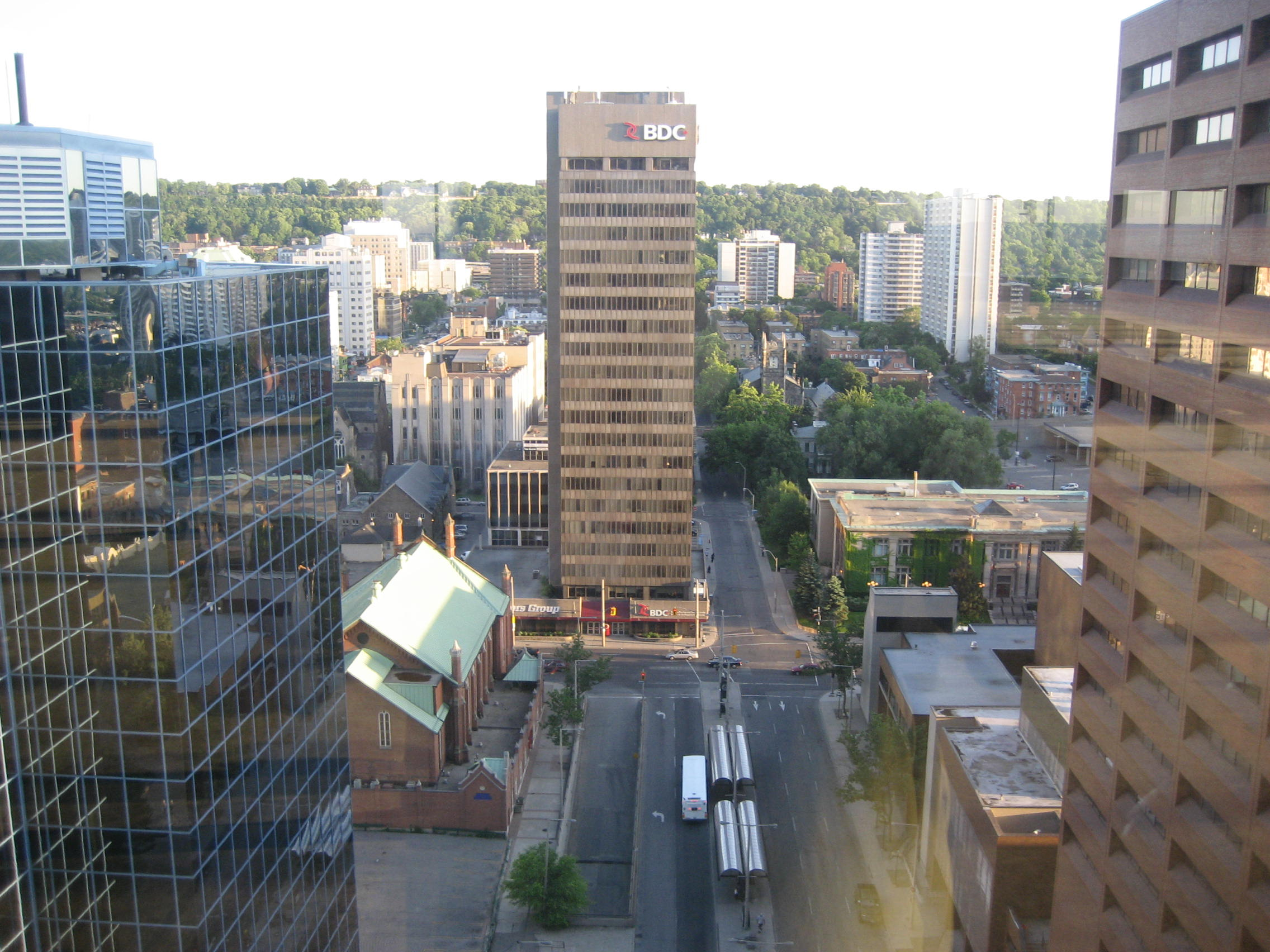
BDC Building, view from atop of Stelco Tower

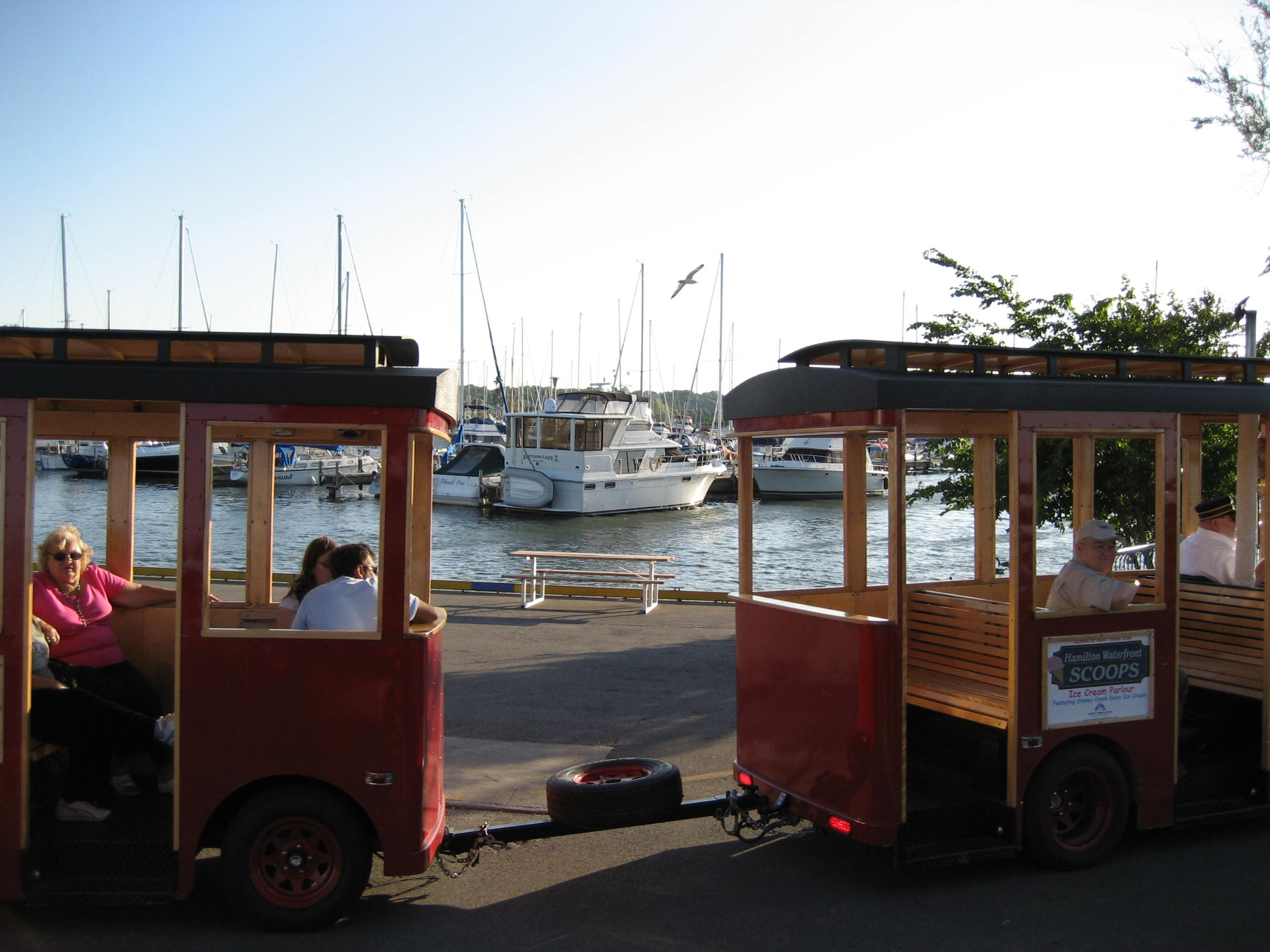
Waterfront Trolley

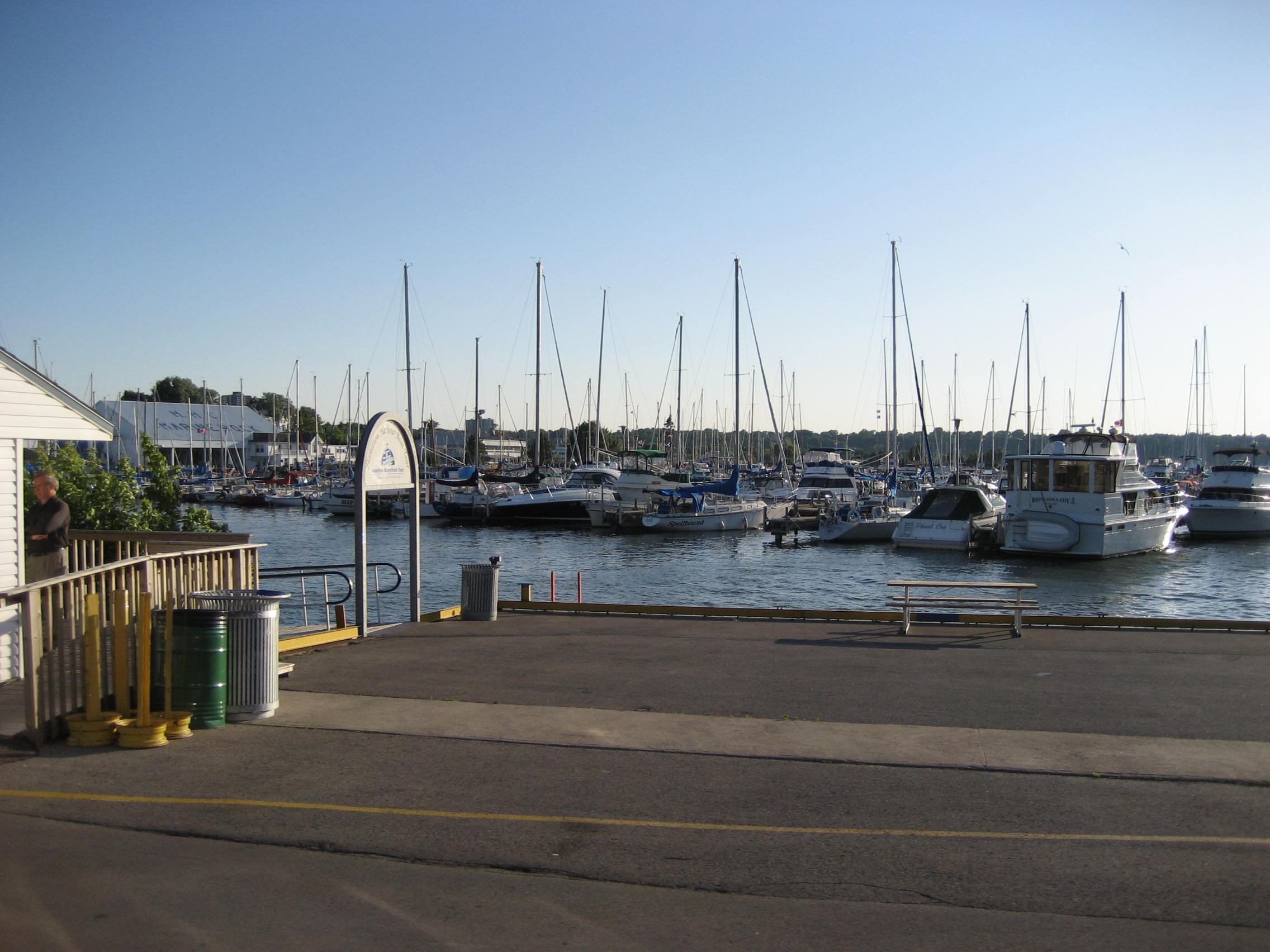
Waterfront Trail
