= First Place Hamilton =

25-storey, (78.0 m), seniors retirement apartment building in Hamilton, Ontario

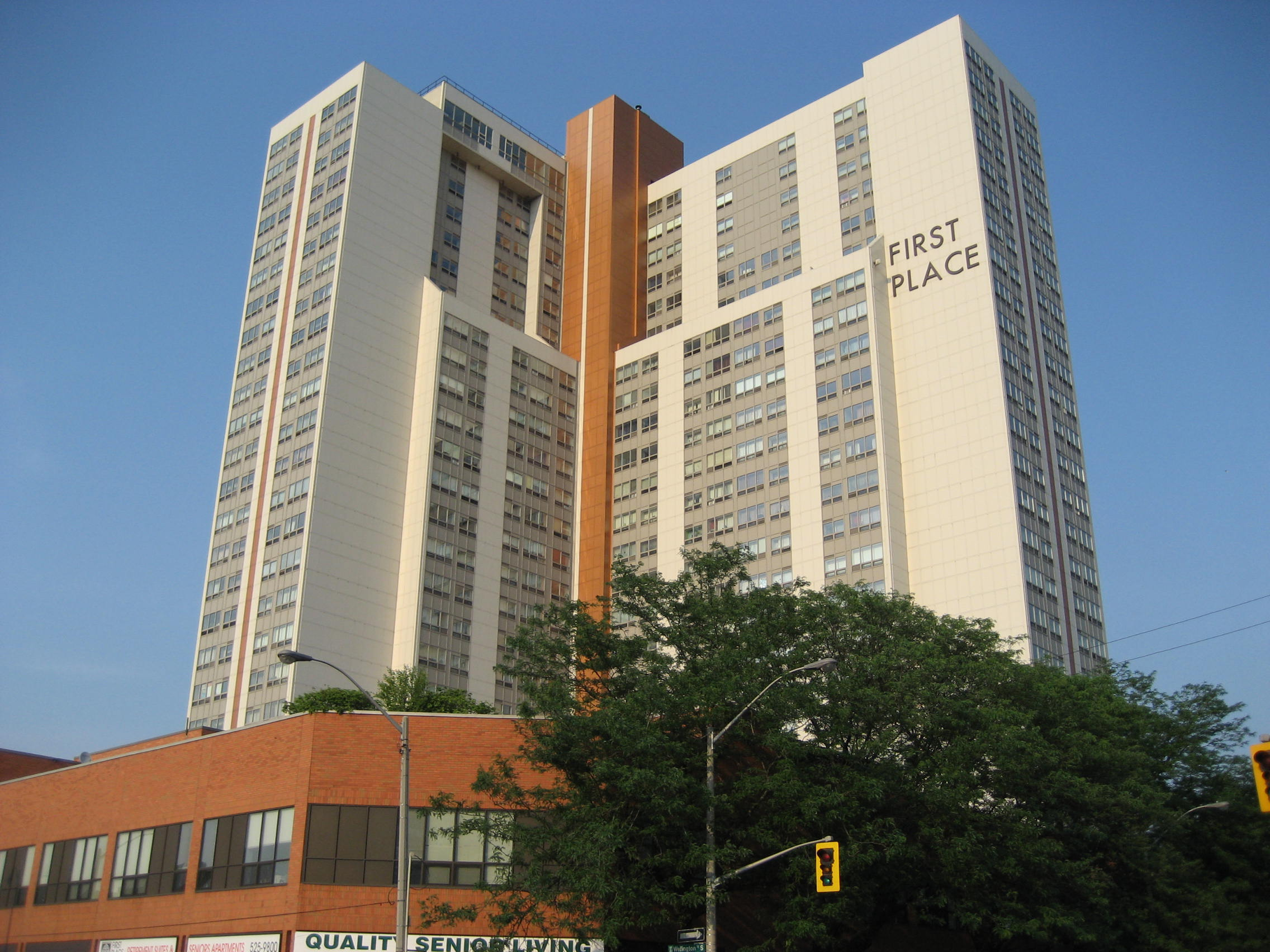
- Interactive map of the First Place Hamilton area

General information
- Type: Residential, office, commercial
- Location: Hamilton, Ontario, Canada
- Coordinates: 43.2531°N 79.8586°W
- Completed: 1976

Height
- Roof: 78 m (256 ft)

Technical details
- Floor count: 25
- Lifts/elevators: 4

Design and construction
- Architect: Trevor P. Garwood-Jones

First Place Hamilton is a 25-storey (78.0 m) seniors retirement apartment building in Hamilton, Ontario, Canada, which was built in 1976. It is the 15th-tallest building in Hamilton. This high rise is situated at the corner of King and Wellington Street South which was the original site of the First United Church, which burned down in 1969.

Described as an active living community that's provided comfortable home and services for seniors in Hamilton for over 3-decades, the property also includes a variety store, pharmacy, restaurants, gym, garden, and faith-based and recreation programs.

== Images ==
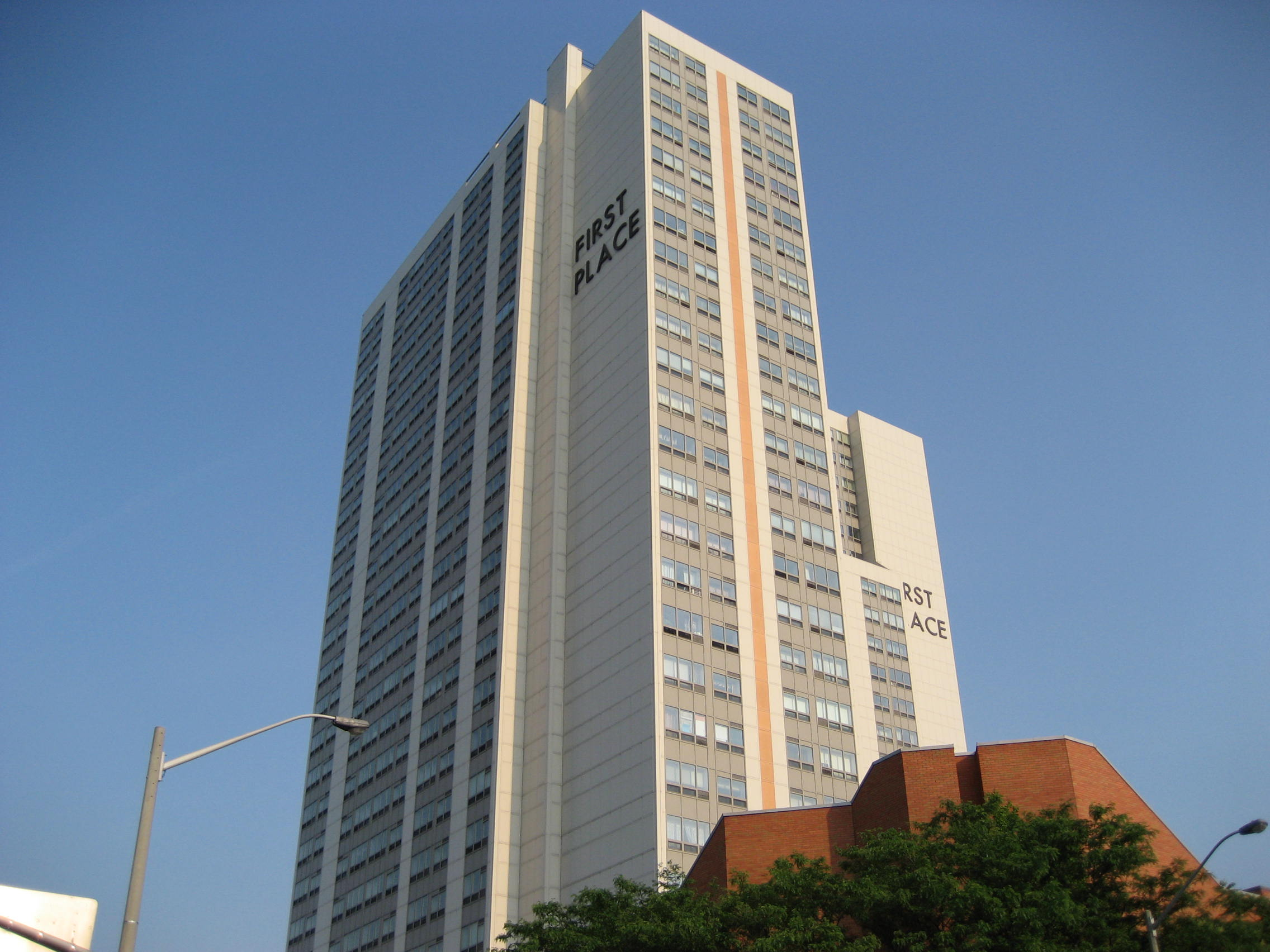
First Place Hamilton

== See also ==
- List of tallest buildings in Hamilton, Ontario
