= List of tallest buildings in Hamilton, Ontario =

Skyline of Hamilton
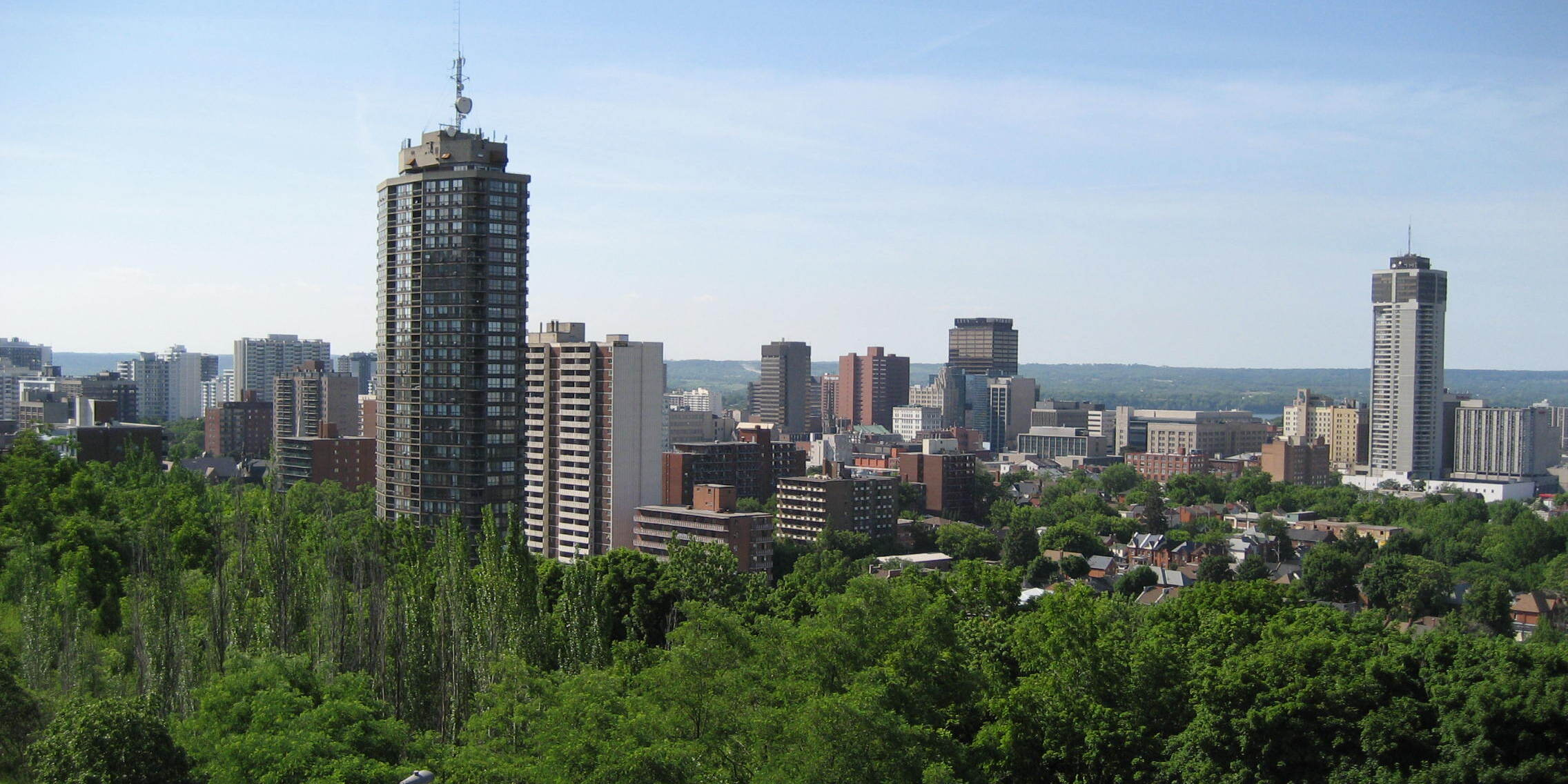
- Hamilton's skyline as viewed from below Sam Lawrence Park in 2007
- Tallest building: Landmark Place (1974)
- Tallest building height: 127 m (417 ft)

Number of tall buildings (2026)
- Taller than 75 m (246 ft): 14
- Taller than 100 m (328 ft): 4

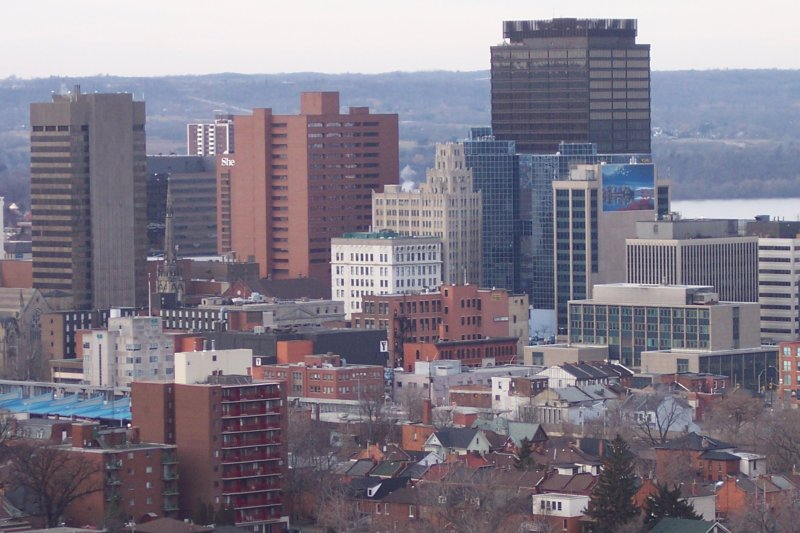
A view of Downtown Hamilton in 2006, featuring 100 King Street West (right)

Hamilton is the fifth-largest city in the Canadian province of Ontario. The Hamilton metropolitan area is the second largest in Ontario located wholly in the province, with a population of 785,184 as of 2021. Hamilton is home to 14 buildings that stand taller than 75 metres (246 ft) as of 2026, four of which reach a height of 100 m (328 ft). Since 1974, the tallest building in Hamilton has been the 43-storey, 127 m (417 ft) Landmark Place. Since the late 2010s, Hamilton has seen an influx of residential high-rises, similar to other cities in southern Ontario such as Kitchener or London.

The first skyscraper in Hamilton is considered to be the 64 m (210 ft), 18-storey tall Pigott Building, a Art Deco/Gothic Revival style building completed in 1929. The Pigott Building was the only high-rise constructed in Hamilton in the early 20th century, and remained the tallest building in the city for four decades. The 1970s was a significant decade for Hamilton's skyline; two office towers, BDC Building in 1971 and 100 King Street West in 1973, each briefly became the city's tallest building. The decade also saw the construction of taller residential towers such as First Place Hamilton, Olympia Apartments, and Landmark Place. Originally known as Century 21 Apartments, Landmark Place remains the city's tallest building today.

Relatively little high-rise development took place in Hamilton from the 1980s to the 2000s. The city has been undergoing a residential high-rise construction boom since the 2010s, driven by a growing population and high residential demand. The boom has led to the construction of the Hamilton's second-tallest building, the 111 m (364 ft), 34-storey 75 James Street South, in 2026, as well as its third-tallest, the 104 m (340 ft), 32-storey Marquee Residence, in 2020. Hamilton's tallest buildings are concentrated in downtown, which is located directly south of the western end of Lake Ontario. Across the lake lies Burlington, which has also seen considerable growth in residential high-rises in the 2020s.

== History ==
Number of buildings by height in Hamilton by the end of each year, based on the information in this article. Click on the legend to toggle a specific height on or off. View chart definition.

== Map of tallest buildings ==
This map displays the location of buildings taller than 75 m (246 ft) in London, all of which are in the city's downtown. Each marker is numbered by the building's height rank, and coloured by the decade of its completion.

Buildings taller than 75 m (246 ft) in Hamilton.
- 1970s
- 1980s
- 1990s
- 2000s
- 2010s
- 2020s
1 Landmark Place
2 75 James Street South
3 Marquee Residence
4 100 King Street West
5 Olympia Apartments
6 10 Bay Residence
7 King at Hughson Tower 1
8 King at Hughson Tower 2
9 Ellen Fairclough Building
10 First Place Hamilton
11 Walnut Place
12 BDC Building
13 Regency on Main
14 Platinum Condos

== Tallest buildings ==
This list ranks completed buildings in Hamilton that stand at least 75 m (246 ft) tall as of 2026, based on standard height measurement. This includes spires and architectural details but does not include antenna masts. The “Year” column indicates the year of completion. Buildings tied in height are sorted by year of completion with earlier buildings ranked first, and then alphabetically.

Was the tallest building in Hamilton upon completion

Rank	Name	Image	Location	Height m (ft)	Floors	Year	Purpose	Notes
1	Landmark Place		100 Main Street East 43°15′15″N 79°51′56″W	127 (417)	43	1974	Residential	Tallest building in Hamilton since 1974. Tallest building in Hamilton completed in the 1970s.
2	75 James Street South	—	75 James Street South 43°15′16″N 79°52′09″W	110.8 (364)	34	2026	Residential	Tallest building completed in Hamilton in the 2020s.
3	Marquee Residence		20 George Street 43°15′28″N 79°52′32″W	103.7 (340)	32	2020	Residential	Also known as 20 George St. Contains luxury rental apartments.
4	100 King Street West		100 King Street West 43°15′27″N 79°52′13″W	103 (338)	25	1973	Office	Tallest building in Hamilton briefly from 1973 to 1974. Formerly known as Stelco Tower. Tallest office building in Hamilton.
5	Olympia Apartments		150 Charlton Avenue East 43°14′53″N 79°52′00″W	98 (322)	33	1976	Residential	Located two blocks east of St. Joseph's Healthcare Hamilton.
6	10 Bay Residence	—	10 Bay Street South 43°15′29″N 79°52′28″W	97.9 (321)	30	2024	Residential	Houses graduate students at McMaster University.
7	King at Hughson Tower 1		43-51 King Street East 43°15′23″N 79°52′03″W	97.6 (320)	30	2024	Residential	Also known as King William Urban Rentals 1.
8	King at Hughson Tower 2	—	8-22 Hughson Street North 43°15′24″N 79°52′01″W	97.6 (320)	30	2024	Residential	Also known as King William Urban Rentals 2.
9	Ellen Fairclough Building		119 King Street West 43°15′24″N 79°52′16″W	83.2 (273)	20	1981	Office	The Hamilton Convention Centre occupies the first 3 floors of the building.
10	First Place Hamilton		350 King Street East 43°15′11″N 79°51′31″W	82 (269)	25	1976	Residential	
11	Walnut Place	—	49 Walnut Street South 43°15′12″N 79°51′49″W	81.8 (268)	26	2021	Residential	
12	BDC Building		25 Main Street West 43°15′20″N 79°52′16″W	81.7 (268)	22	1971	Office	Tallest building in Hamilton from 1971 to 1973. The "BDC" stands for the Business Development Bank of Canada
13	Regency on Main	—	140 Main Street West 43°15′26″N 79°52′32″W	81.7 (268)	25	2016	Residential	
14	Platinum Condos	—	15 Queen Street South 43°15′33″N 79°52′43″W	81.3 (267)	23	2022	Residential	

== Tallest under construction and proposed ==
=== Under construction ===
The following table includes buildings under construction in Hamilton that are planned to be at least 75 m (246 ft) tall as of 2026, based on standard height measurement. The “Year” column indicates the expected year of completion. Buildings that are on hold are not included.

Name	Height m (ft)	Floors	Year	Purpose	Notes
Television City 1	108.8 (357)	32	2026	Residential	
Television City 2	108.8 (357)	32	2026	Residential	
188 Cannon St E	106.1 (348)	32	—	Residential	
The Design District Tower A	102.3 (336)	31	2026	Residential	
The Design District Tower B	101.1 (332)	31	2026	Residential	
The Design District Tower C	101.1 (332)	31	2027	Residential	
48 Ferguson Avenue South	97.8 (321)	30	—	Residential	
213 King Street West	94.3 (309)	30	2026	Residential	
354 King Street West	80.9 (265)	25	2026	Residential	

=== Proposed ===
The following table includes approved and proposed buildings in Hamilton that are expected to be at least 100 m (328 ft) tall as of 2026, based on standard height measurement. The “Year” column indicates the expected year of completion. A dash “–“ indicates information about the building’s height, floor count, or year of completion is unknown or has not been released.

Name	Height m (ft)	Floors	Year	Purpose	Notes
Pier 8 Block 16	147 (482)	47	–	Residential	
117 Jackson St E 1	126.5 (415)	39	2028	Residential	
98 James Street South	112.5 (369)	34	–	Residential	
Gore Park Condos	106.9 (351)	32	–	Residential	
73 Hughson Street North	105.4 (346)	31	–	Residential	
92 John St. N	104.5 (343)	31	–	Residential	

== Other notable buildings and structures ==
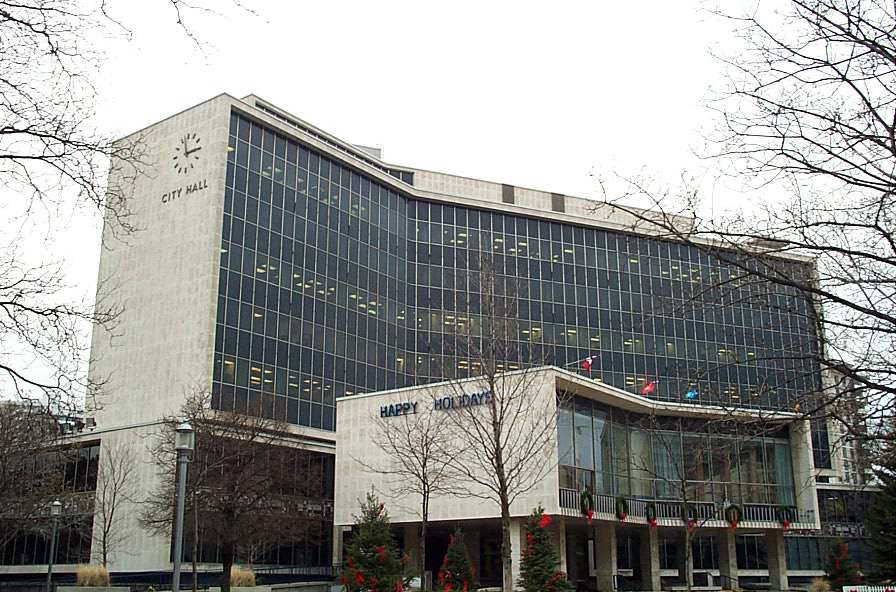
Hamilton City Hall

=== Hamilton City Hall ===
Hamilton City Hall is an 8-storey, International-style government building located in downtown Hamilton. In 2005, Hamilton City Council designated the building as a heritage structure. Among the listed heritage elements on the exterior are the Italian glass tile mosaics.

=== Royal Connaught Hotel ===
The Royal Connaught Hotel is a historic 13-storey building located in downtown Hamilton. The hotel served as the Governors meeting hall of the NHL, the site of female athlete accommodations for the 1930 British Empire Games, and a wide variety of hotels. From 2014 to 2018, it was converted to a condominium.

=== CHCH Television Tower ===
CHCH Television Tower was a 357.5-metre-high (1,173 ft) guyed TV mast in Hamilton, which served as the primary transmitter for television station CHCH-TV.

When it was built in 1960, the CHCH Television Tower became the tallest structure in Canada. Only two structures built afterwards became taller within Canada: the CN Tower in Toronto and the Inco Superstack in Sudbury, Ontario. The CHCH tower ranked eighth in height among the tallest structures in the British-based Commonwealth.

== Timeline of tallest buildings ==
This lists buildings that once held the title of the tallest building in Hamilton.

Name	Image	Years as tallest	Height m (ft)	Floors	References
Pigott Building		1929–1971	64 (210)	18	
BDC Building		1971–1973	81.7 (268)	22	
100 King Street West		1973–1974	103 (338)	25	
Landmark Place		1974–present	127 (417)	43	

== See also ==
- List of tallest buildings in Canada
- List of tallest buildings in Ontario
- List of tallest buildings in Toronto
- List of tallest buildings in Mississauga
- List of tallest buildings in Niagara Falls, Ontario
- List of tallest buildings in the Waterloo Regional Municipality
- List of tallest buildings in London, Ontario
- List of tallest buildings in Ottawa-Gatineau
- Canadian architecture
- Chateau Royale (Hamilton, Ontario)
