= Landmark Place =

Tallest building in downtown Hamilton, Ontario, Canada

Coordinates: 43.2540°N 79.8655°W

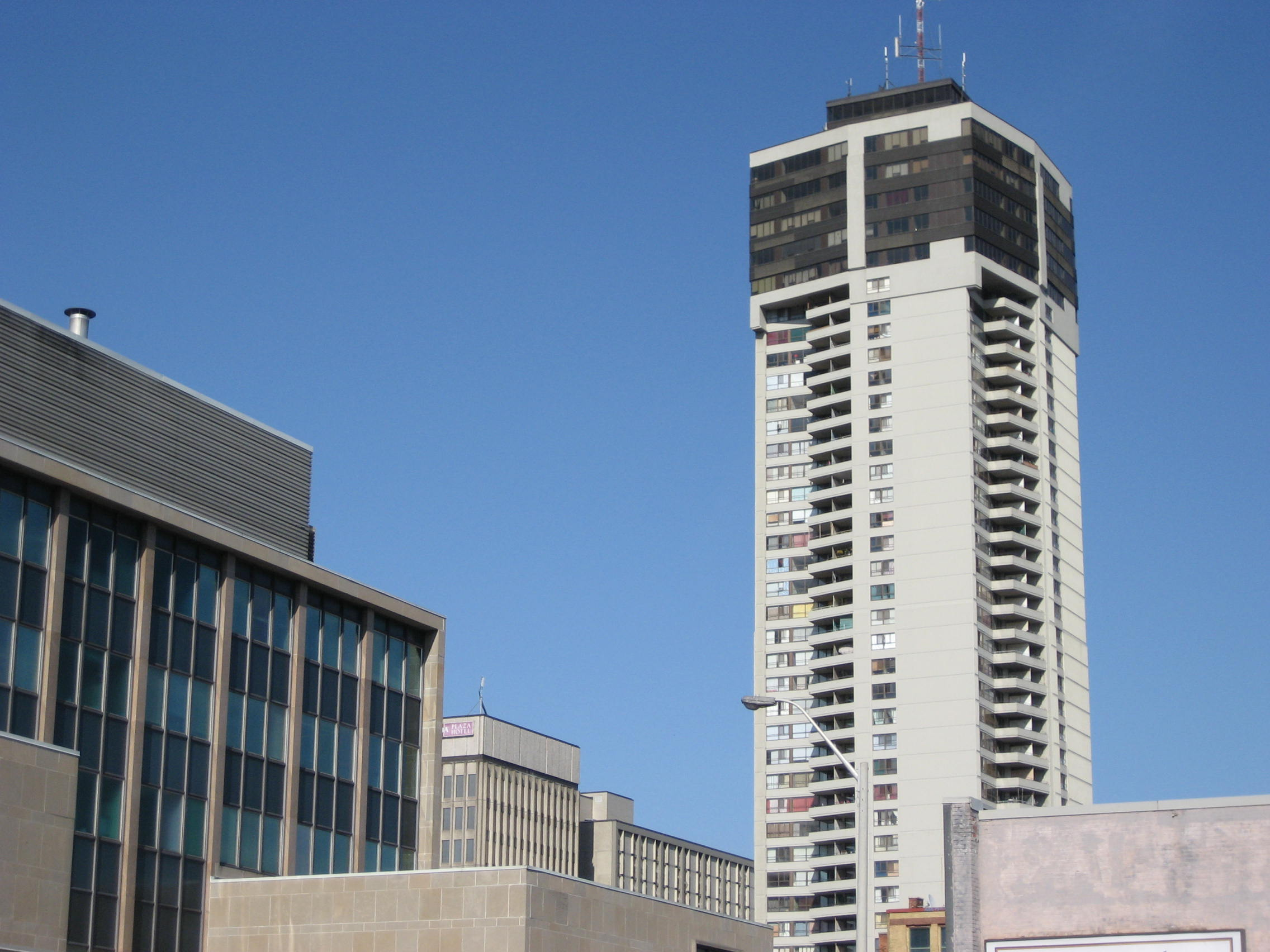
- Interactive map of the Landmark Place area

General information
- Type: Residential/ retail
- Architectural style: Brutalist / Modernist
- Location: Hamilton, Ontario, Canada
- Completed: 1974

Height
- Roof: 127 m (417 ft)

Technical details
- Floor count: 44 including observation deck
- Lifts/elevators: 6

Landmark Place is the tallest building in downtown Hamilton, Ontario, Canada, at the corner of Main Street East and Catharine Street South in the Corktown neighbourhood. This 43-storey building (130 metres/427 feet) was completed in 1974, and was originally known as the Century 21 building. It was built by Al Frisina as a mixed use building; commercial, residential and retail. Original plans included adding a heliport and a revolving rooftop restaurant but those plans were scrapped. Frisina also believes that no other building will be built in Hamilton taller than Landmark Place because as he puts it; 'the demand's not there and nobody's crazy enough to do it.' In the early 1960s, Frisina took on Hamilton's six-storey height limit. He brought in a consultant who told the city it could save money on services by building up instead of out. Frisina won and built the 18-storey Clarendon on Hunter near Bay. Today it is known as The Fontainebleu.

The top 5 floors of the building are now occupied by luxury suites.

== Images ==
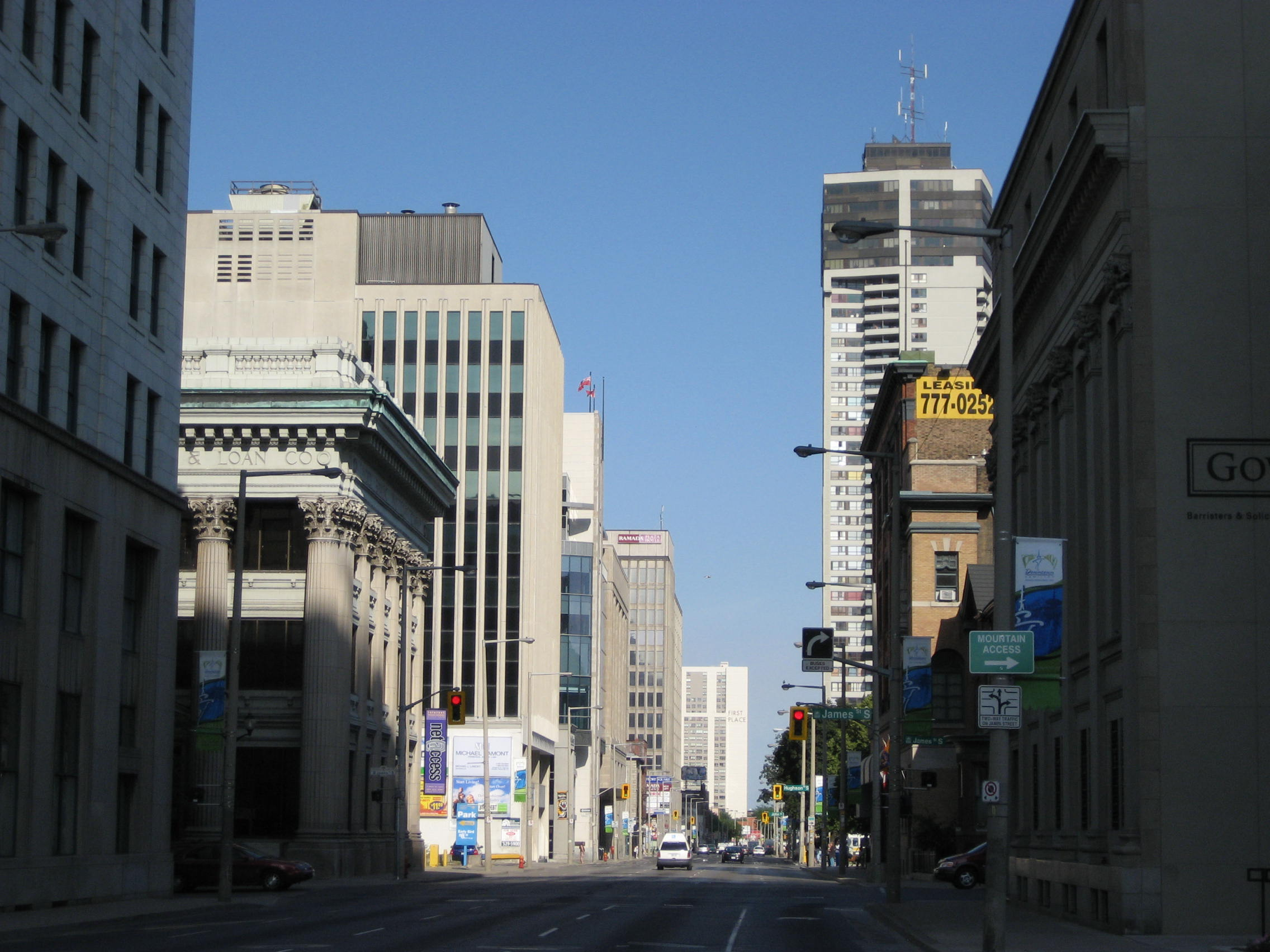
Main Street, looking East

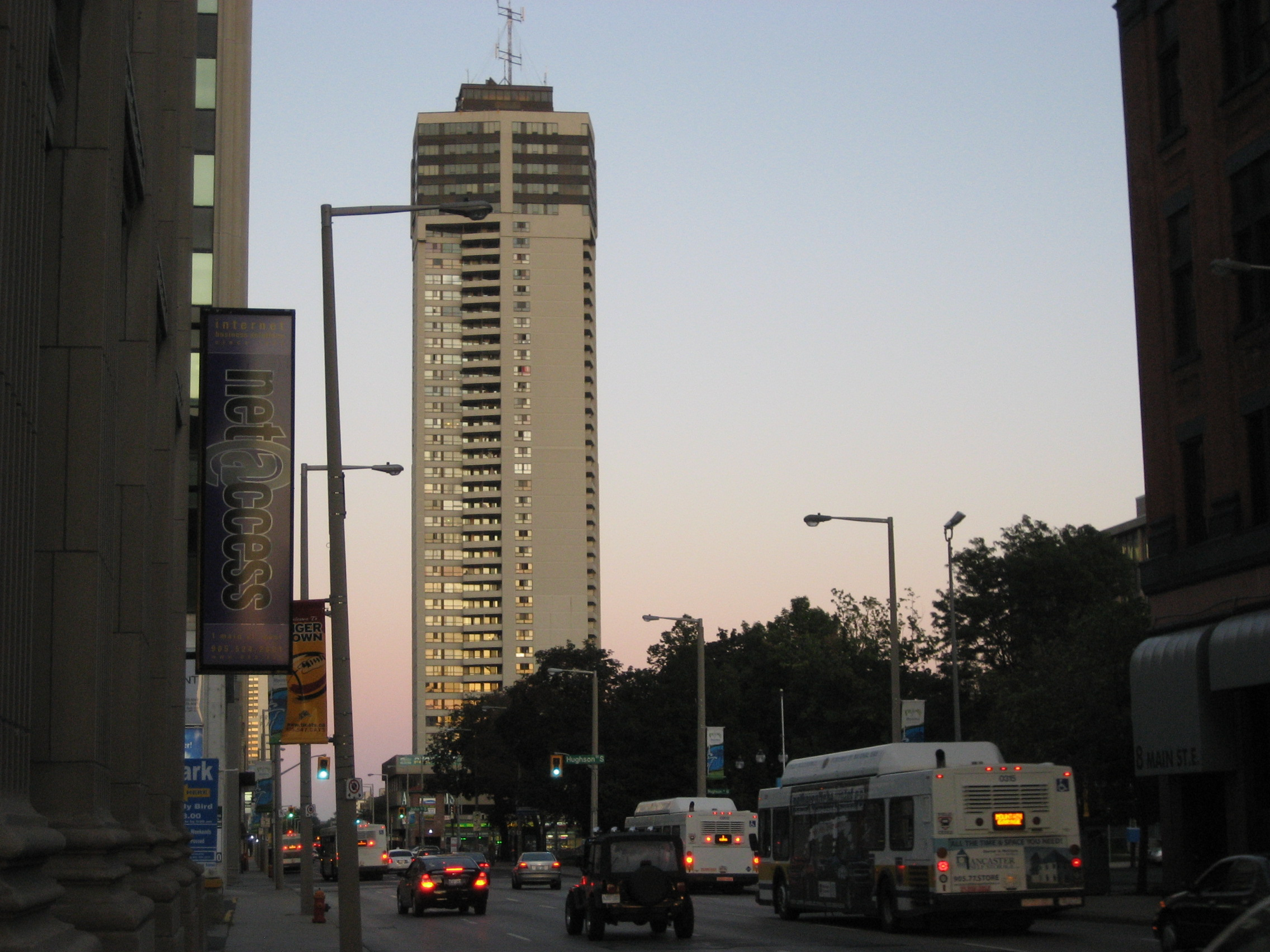
Landmark Place

== See also ==
- List of tallest buildings in Hamilton, Ontario
