= Olympia Apartments (Hamilton, Ontario) =

33-storey (98 metres) condo building is the 4th tallest building in Hamilton, Ontario

Olympia Condos
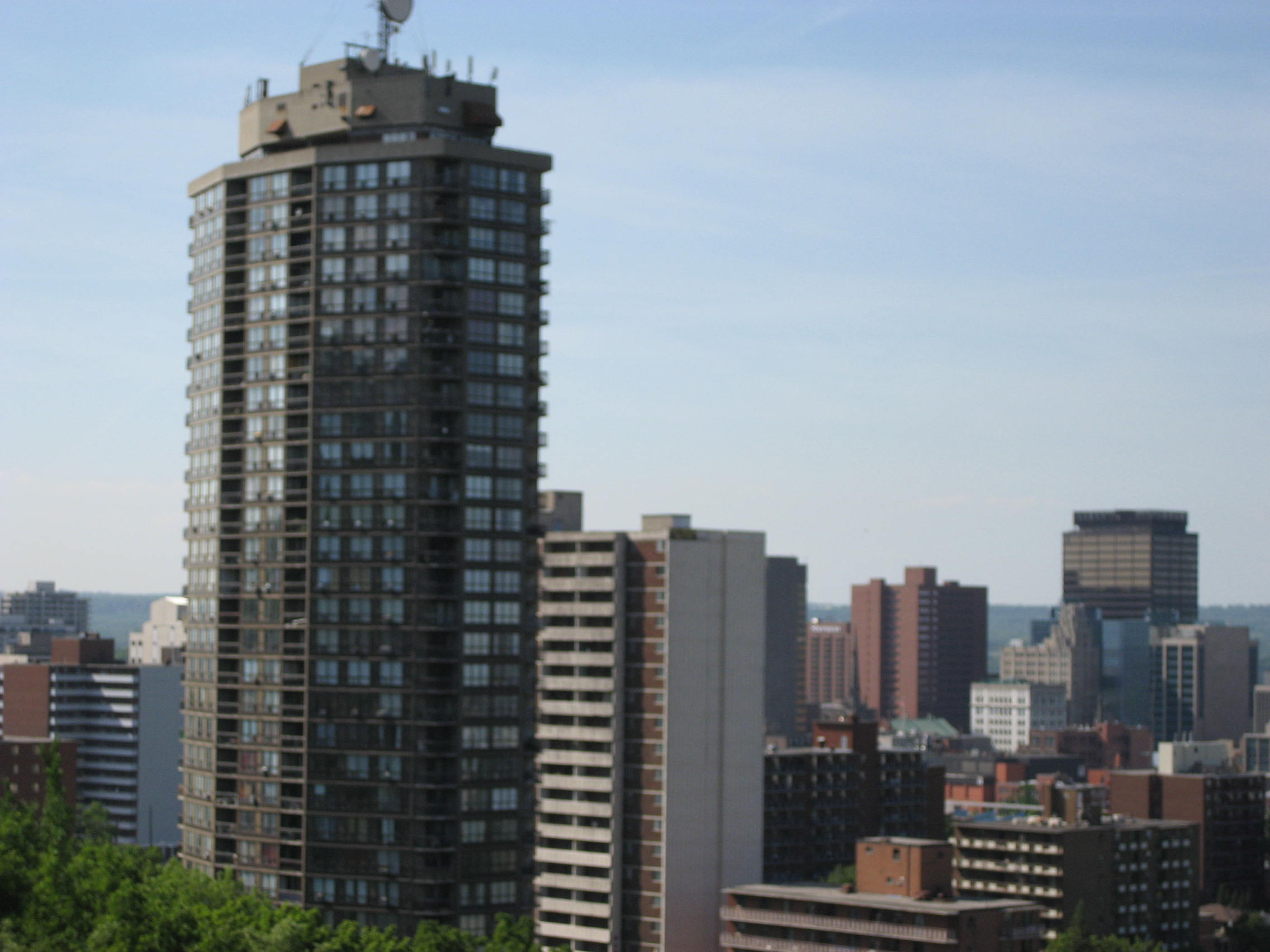
- Interactive map of the Olympia Condos area

General information
- Type: Residential
- Location: Hamilton, Ontario, Canada
- Coordinates: 43.24816°N 79.86684°W
- Completed: 1976

Height
- Roof: 98 m (322 ft)

Technical details
- Floor count: 33
- Lifts/elevators: 3

The Olympia Condos, a 33-storey (98 metres) condo building is the 6th tallest building in Hamilton, Ontario, Canada. Situated just east of John Street South on Charlton Avenue East in the Corktown neighbourhood, 2 blocks east of the St. Joseph's hospital and nearby is the mountain access known as Arkledun Avenue/Jolley Cut. It is also a 5-minute walk to the downtown Hamilton GO Transit station from this location.

The building features an indoor pool, squash courts, a fitness room and sauna. Every apartment has a balcony. On a clear day from the top floor balconies the Toronto skyline can be seen across Lake Ontario.

== See also ==
- List of tallest buildings in Hamilton, Ontario

== Images ==
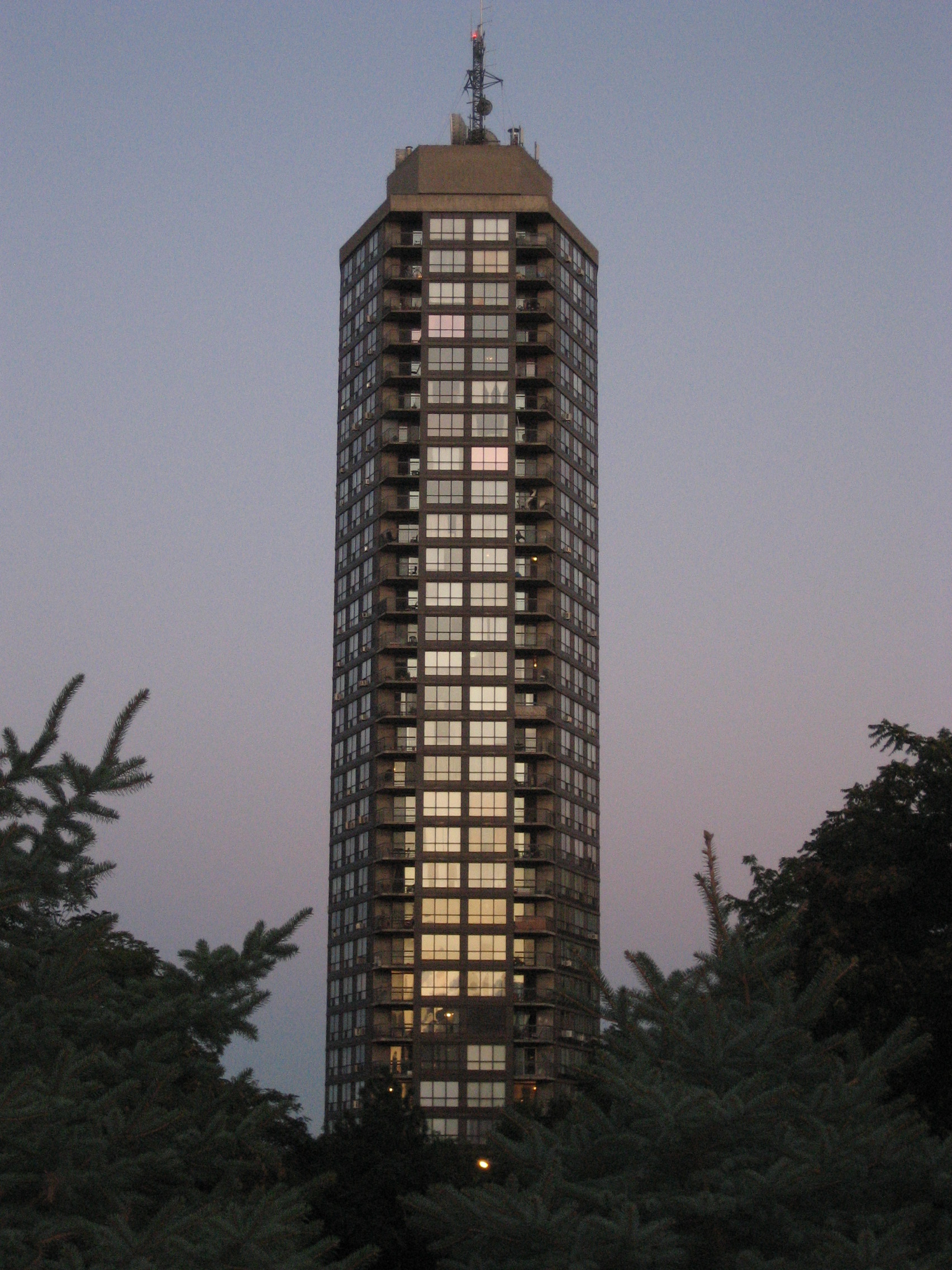
Olympia, view from John Street South
