= Hamilton City Hall =

Chief administrative building

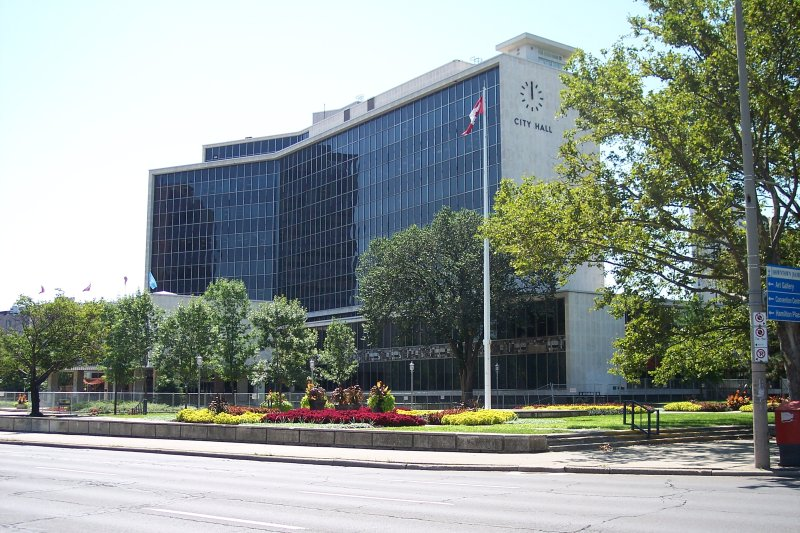
- City hall in 2006
- Interactive map of the Hamilton City Hall area

General information
- Type: City hall
- Architectural style: Internationalism
- Location: 71 Main Street West, Hamilton, Ontario, Canada
- Coordinates: 43.25550°N 79.87329°W
- Opened: November 21, 1960; 65 years ago
- Owner: City of Hamilton
- Governing body: Hamilton City Council

Height
- Height: 34 m (111 ft 6 1/2 in)

Technical details
- Floor count: 8

Design and construction
- Architect: Stanley M. Roscoe

Website
- www.hamilton.ca/city-hall

Hamilton City Hall is the chief administrative building for the city of Hamilton. Located in the downtown core, it is an 8-storey building (34.0 m) at the corner of Main Street West and Bay Street South, across the street from the FirstOntario Concert Hall and the Art Gallery of Hamilton. It was officially opened on November 21, 1960. This international style of architecture was designed by architect Stanley Roscoe. Construction was carried out by the Pigott Construction Company, at a cost of 9.4 million dollars.

== History ==
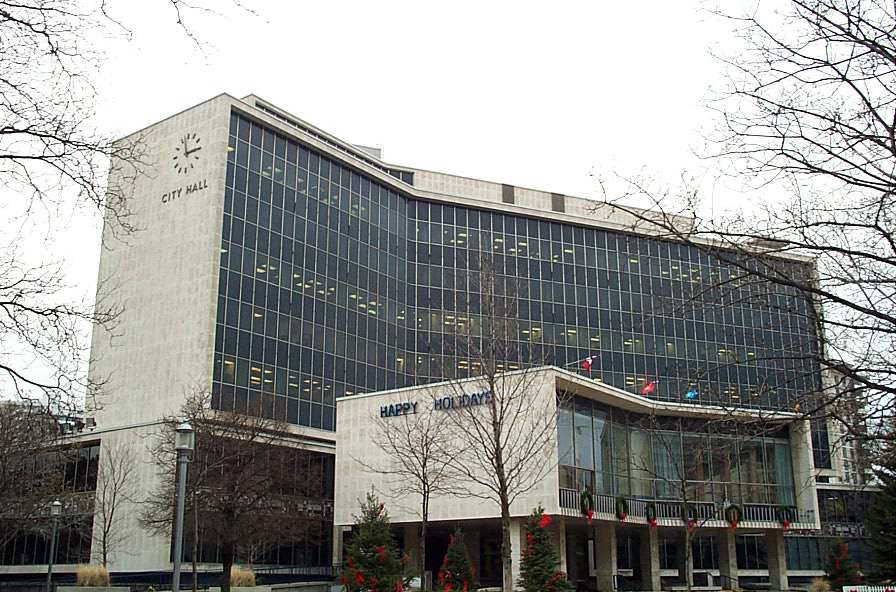
Hamilton City Hall (winter)

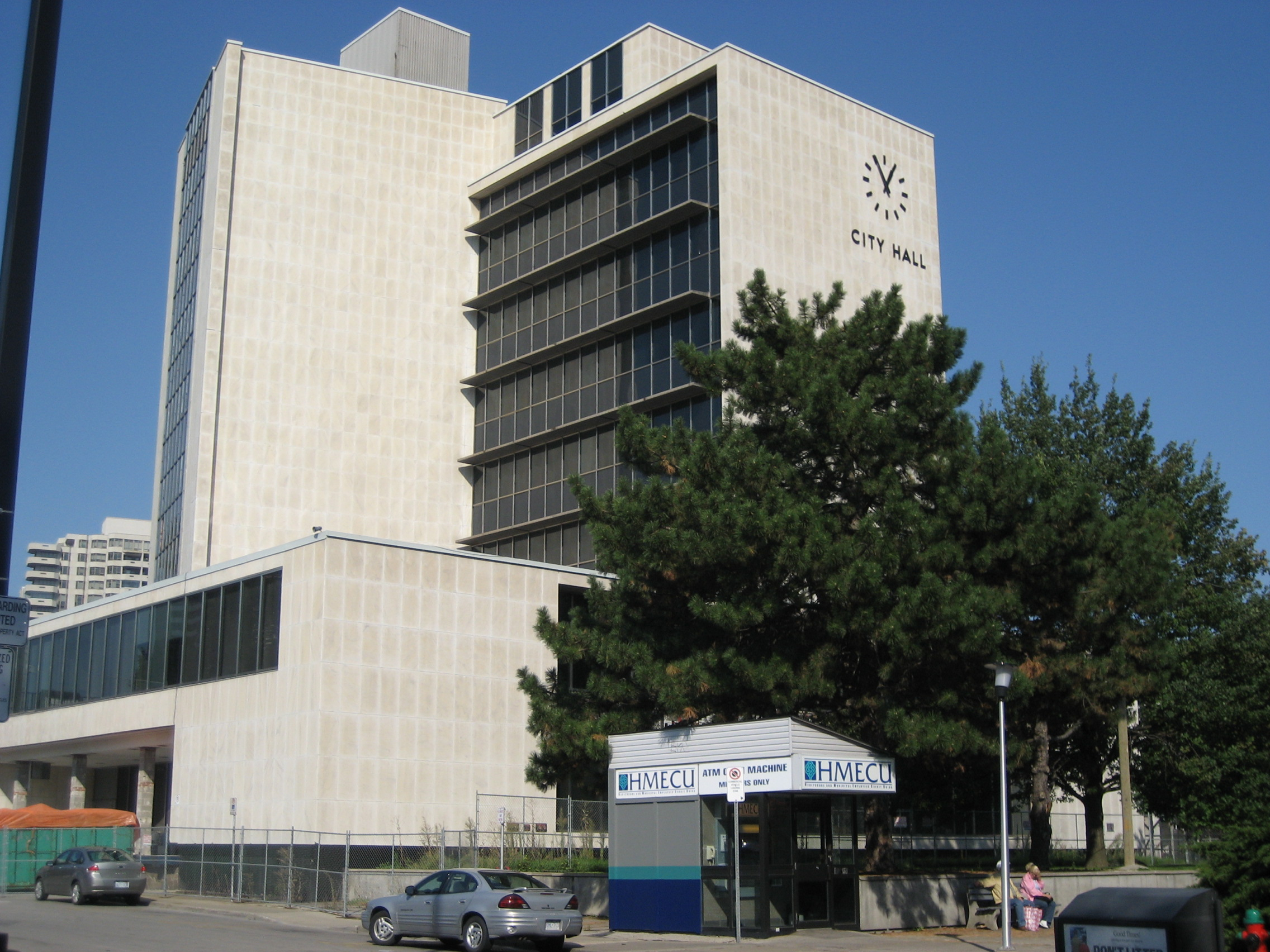
City Hall (west end)

The municipal address of the building is 71 Main Street West. The street number was chosen carefully. Several buildings had been torn down to make way for the new City Hall, so city politicians of the day could choose any odd number between 55 and 105 as the address for the new building. They chose 71 to commemorate the number of years that the old City Hall on James Street North had been in use.

Prior to making the decision to construct the new City Hall, council had considered annexing the Lister Block for offices and connecting it to the old City hall via an overhead, enclosed walkway spanning James Street North.

In 2005, Hamilton City Council designated the building as a heritage structure. Among the listed heritage elements on the exterior are the Italian glass tile mosaics.

== Renovation project ==
In May 2007, Hamilton City Council directed staff to proceed with the renovation of the building, and the launch phase of the project began in June 2008. Costs, designs and delivery of the project were approved by the council in October 2008, allowing pre-construction and initial renovation work to begin later that year. The project was expected to be complete by July 1, 2010. City Hall services began moving back to Hamilton City Hall in April, 2010.

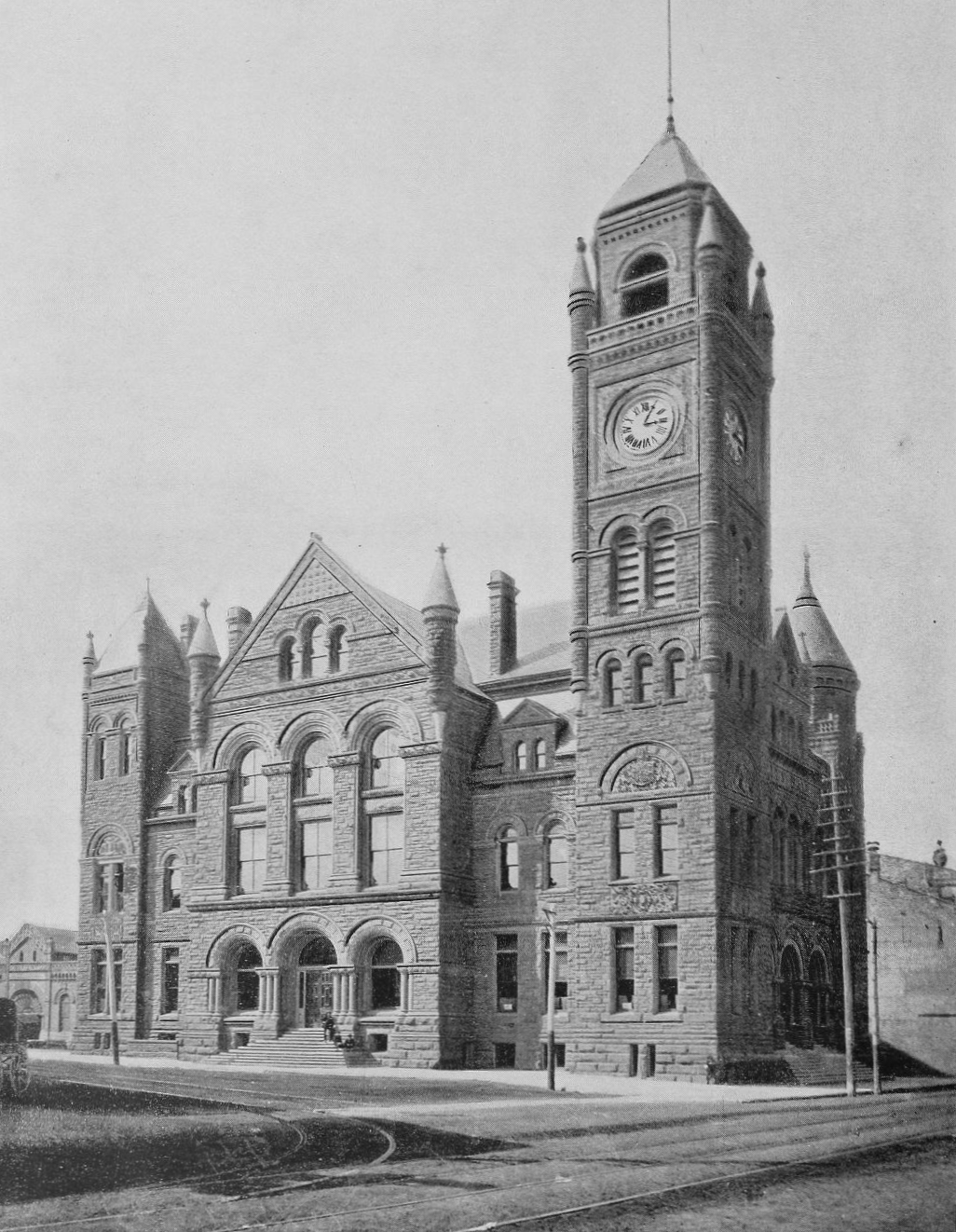
Old city hall was built in 1888 and was designed by James Balfour. It was demolished in 1961.

== See also ==
- List of tallest buildings in Hamilton
