= Thomas McQuesten =

Canadian politician (1882–1948)

Thomas McQuesten QC
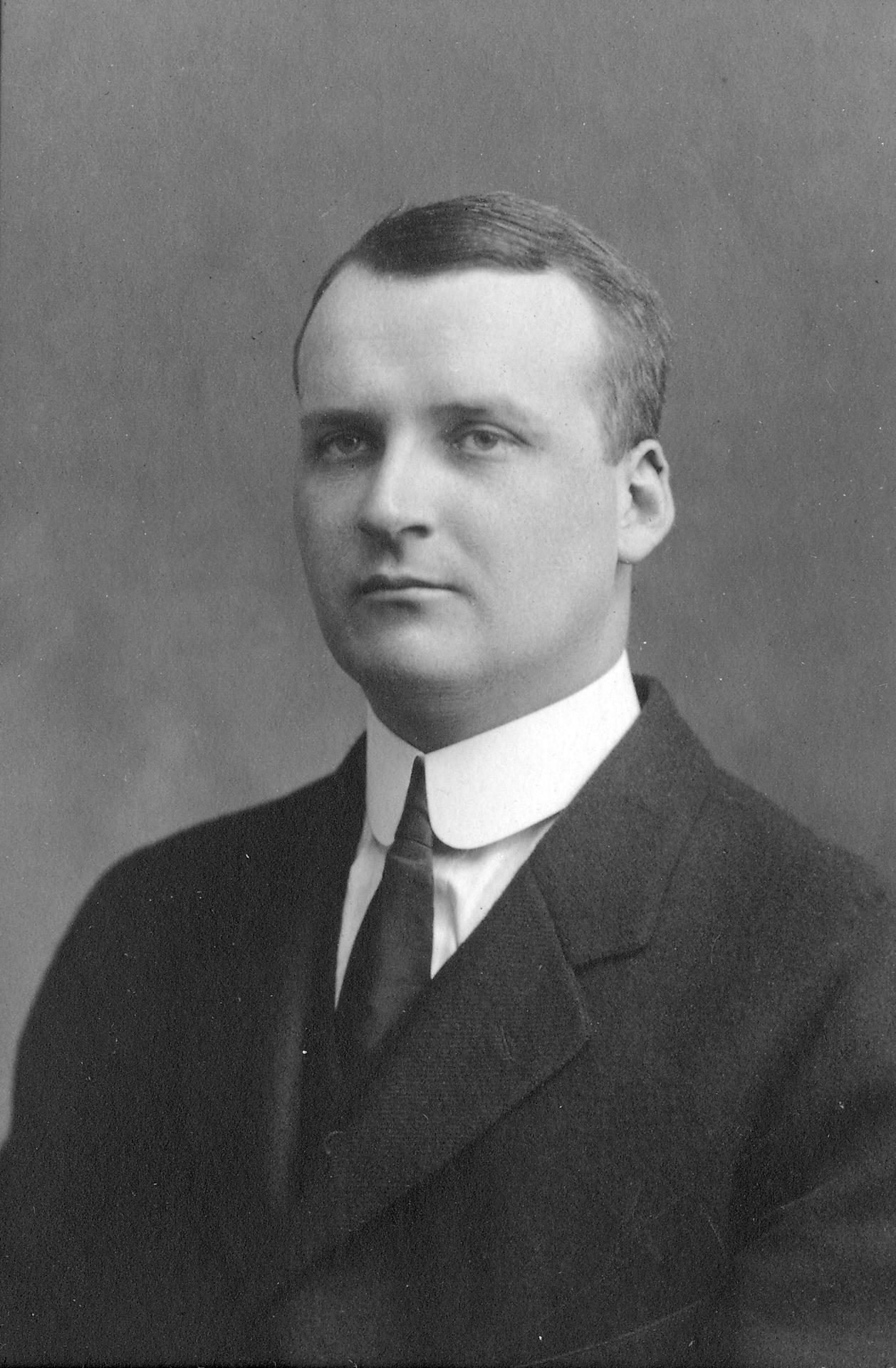
- McQueston in 1940

Ontario MPP
- In office 1934–1943
- Preceded by: Riding established
- Succeeded by: Frederick Wilson Warren
- Constituency: Hamilton—Wentworth

Personal details
- Born: Thomas Baker McQuesten; June 30, 1882 Hespeler, Ontario, Canada
- Died: January 13, 1948 (aged 65) Hamilton, Ontario, Canada
- Party: Ontario Liberal
- Parents: Isaac McQuesten (father); Mary Baker McQuesten (mother)
- Education: University of Toronto; Osgoode Hall
- Occupation: Politician; lawyer

Thomas Baker McQuesten QC (June 30, 1882 – January 13, 1948) was a Canadian politician in Ontario, Canada. He was a Liberal member of the Legislative Assembly of Ontario from 1934 to 1943 who represented the riding of Hamilton—Wentworth. He served as a cabinet minister in the governments of Mitchell Hepburn and Gordon Conant.

== Background ==
McQuesten was born in Hespeler (now Cambridge, Ontario) in nearby Waterloo County, the youngest son of the five children of Isaac McQuesten and Mary Baker McQuesten. His father died from overdosing on sleeping pills leaving the family almost bankrupt when Thomas was six years old, and the family homestead narrowly avoided being sold to cover these debts. His family remained staunch Presbyterians, except one (Rev. Calvin, Chaplain of the Hamilton Sanitarium) and rejected joining the United Church of Canada in 1925.

Thomas received his primary and secondary education in Hamilton at Central School, and the Hamilton Collegiate Institute. In his graduating year of 1900, the HCI football team won the Ontario Championship.

Since there was no university in Hamilton at the time, McQuesten had to leave the city for his post-secondary education. He earned a B.A. in English, history, and classics at the University of Toronto. Extracurricular activity included rowing for the Toronto Argonauts (which was also a football team), president of Zeta Psi fraternity and editor of The Varsity newspaper.

McQuesten's older sister, Ruby Baker McQuesten, played a vital role in Thomas' life and success, however there is no record of him acknowledging her sacrifices. Ruby took a job as a teacher and sent almost her entire salary home to pay for Thomas' education. In her time away, Ruby wrote home of her loneliness. She eventually contracted a cough and died of tuberculosis.

Although a fellow U of T student beat his application for a Rhodes scholarship, McQuesten continued his education at Osgoode Hall, also in Toronto. He received his LL.B. law degree and was admitted to the bar in 1907. He began practicing law as a prelude to a planned political career, serving in firms in Toronto, Elk Lake and Hamilton.

During his early adulthood, McQuesten served part-time in the militia. In 1902, he was in the Royal Canadian Artillery and in 1904 he was a military surveyor. When the First World War began, he wanted to enlist but his family pressured him not to.

Thomas McQuesten cuts the ceremonial ribbon to officially open the Queen Elizabeth Way on August 23, 1940

== Electoral politics ==
McQuesten served as an alderman between 1913 and 1920, and tirelessly promoted parks as chairman of the Works Committee. In 1917, he and others presented a well-written but ultimately unadopted report on town planning with emphasis on railway lands.

Since his electoral ambitions reached higher, he began his climb in the Liberal Party of Ontario. In the early 1920s, he was an executive of the Hamilton Liberal Association and by the early 1930s he rose to provincial president. Finally, in 1934, he was elected as an MLA (later styled MPP) for Hamilton (the Legislative Assembly site says the riding was Hamilton Wentworth, but other sources say Hamilton West).

The newly elected MLA entered the provincial cabinet, serving concurrently as minister of highways (a position he held until 1943) and minister of public works. Among the many construction projects he spearheaded across Ontario were:

- the Queen Elizabeth Way linking Toronto, Ontario with Niagara Falls and Fort Erie
- the Niagara Parkway along the Niagara River and the Rainbow Bridge over it in Niagara Falls
- the Blue Water Bridge in Sarnia
- the Highway 20 link along the top of Niagara Escarpment from Niagara Falls to Stoney Creek.
- the Highway 2A through Oshawa, Ontario, now Highway 401.

Due in part to the start Second World War, Liberal Premier Mitchell Hepburn decided to keep the legislature and its second term government going longer than was popular. McQuesten participated in this strategy, adding a shifting number of portfolios to highways: mines (1940, 1942–43), municipal affairs (1940–43), and public works again (1942–43).

McQuestion ran to succeed Hepburn in the 1943 Liberal leadership convention, placing third with 40 votes behind Harry Nixon and Arthur Roebuck.

McQuesten was defeated in the 1943 Ontario general election which saw the Liberal Party under Nixon defeated by the Conservatives led by George Drew. The Liberals would remain out of government for the next 42 years until David Peterson became premier in 1985.

=== Cabinet posts ===
Conant ministry, Province of Ontario (1942–1943)
Hepburn ministry, Province of Ontario (1934–1942)
Cabinet posts (3)
Predecessor	Office	Successor
Eric Cross	Minister of Municipal Affairs; 1940-1943	Bill Goodfellow
Paul Leduc	Minister of Mines; 1940 (September–October)	Robert Laurier
Leopold Macaulay	Minister of Public Works and Highways; 1934-1943	George Doucett

== Appointed politics ==
Throughout his life, McQuesten was able to parlay electoral success into permanent appointments to non-partisan agencies. This suited his technocratic (and sometimes autocratic) nature, allowing him to focus on necessary and useful but rarely politically interesting or rewarding activities.

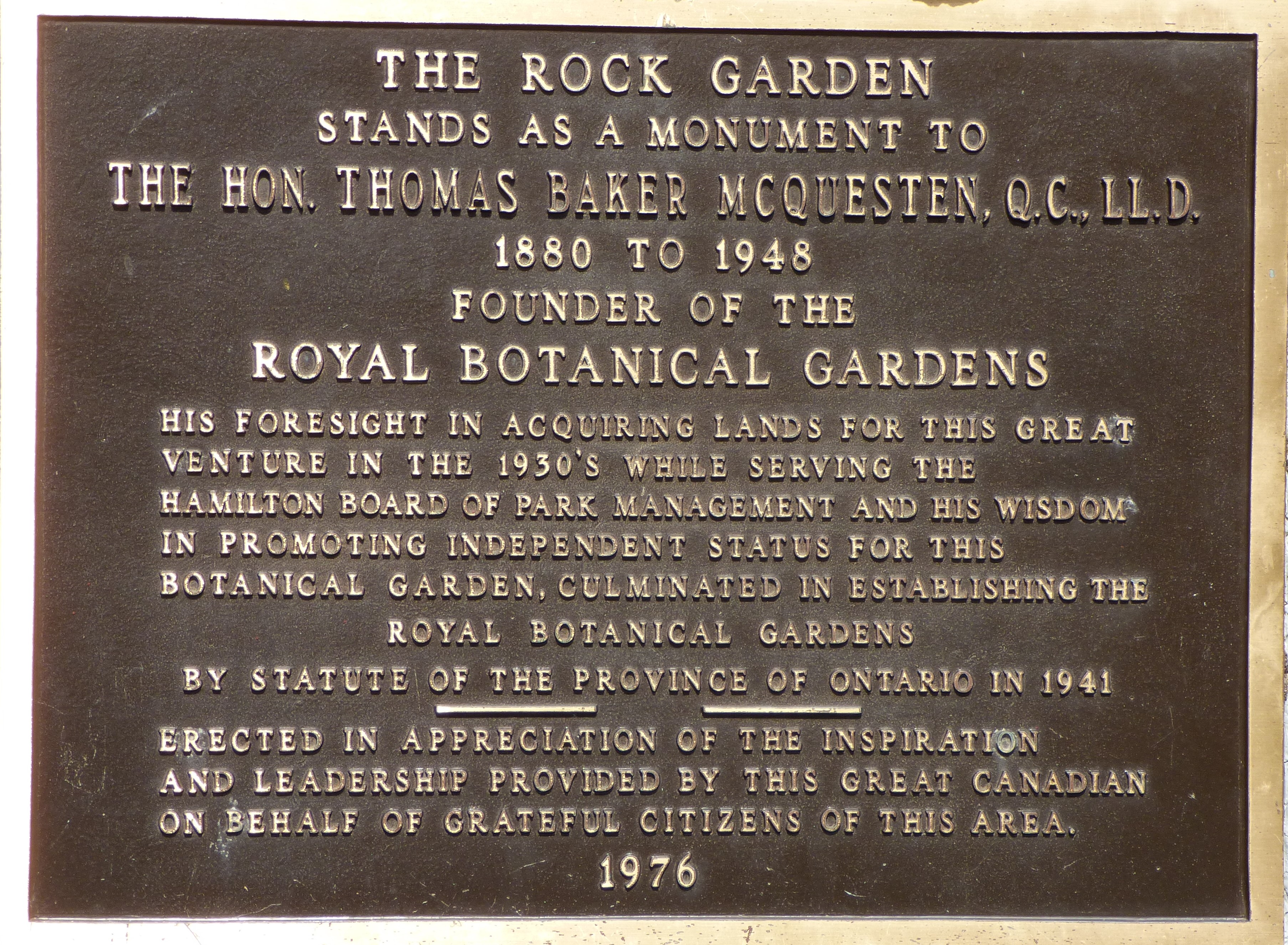
Plaque in Royal Botanical Gardens (Ontario) on Thomas McQuesten.

For instance, his advocacy for parks on Hamilton, Ontario City Council earned him an appointment to the permanent position on the Board of Park Management in 1922, where he remained until his death in 1948. In this position, he supported the construction of the Rock Garden and other landscaped areas on the Burlington Heights, which became part of Royal Botanical Gardens in 1932. After his retirement from electoral politics, McQuesten resumed his interest in RBG and became an executive member of that organization, active there until just before he died.

Among the many Hamilton civic leaders and boosters, McQuesten helped encourage McMaster University to relocate from downtown Toronto to west Hamilton in 1930. His motivations may have included the fact he had to move himself to attend university and that while there he lost the Rhodes Scholarship to a full-time Toronto resident in what was regarded as a slight against Hamilton.

After being elected an MLA in 1934, he served for a decade as the appointed chairman of the Niagara Parks Commission. Fort George at Niagara-on-the-Lake was rebuilt during his tenure.

He used his role as transportation minister to secure appointment as chairman of the Canada-U.S. Niagara Falls Bridge Commission in 1939. In addition to the more usual transportation aspects of the job, he used his position to engage in petty rivalry with wartime Prime Minister of Canada and fellow Liberal William Lyon Mackenzie King over an inscription on carillon bells at the Rainbow Bridge (Niagara Falls).

== Death and tributes ==
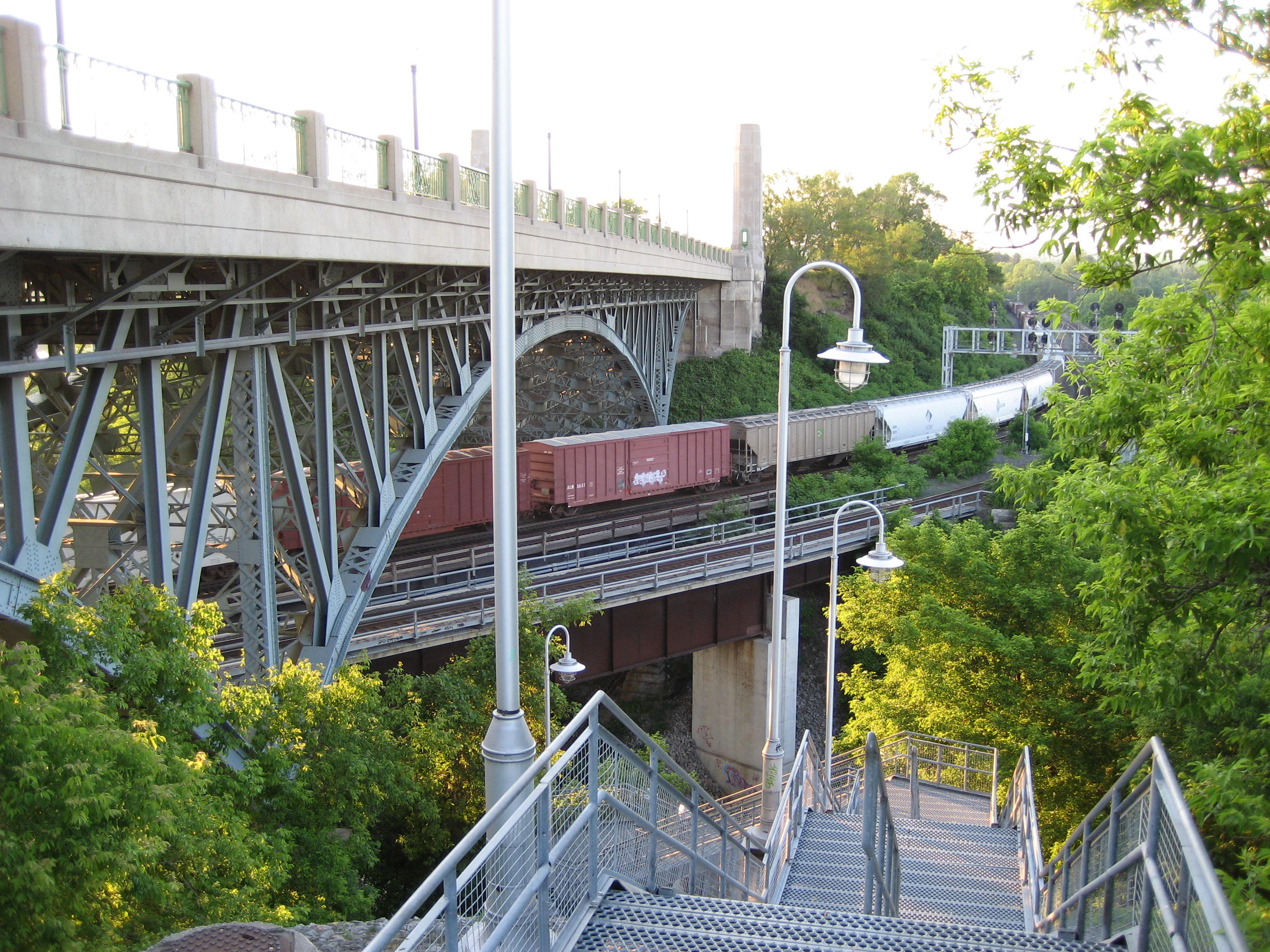
Stairway, T.B. McQuesten High Level Bridge, leading down to Waterfront Trail, Hamilton, Ontario.

In his last year of life, McQuesten suffered from intestinal cancer which had metastasized to his throat and he died on January 13, 1948. Shortly before dying, he was named Hamilton's Citizen of the Year.

After his death, the Hamilton High Level Bridge on York Boulevard was renamed Thomas B. McQuesten High Level Bridge. The structure was planned and built in the 1920s and '30s in conjunction with the North-Western Entrance to Hamilton program of the Board of Park Management, when he was most active on it. It spans the channel linking Cootes Paradise and the Desjardins Canal to Hamilton Harbour. The elegant bridge was designed by John M. Lyle.

His historic downtown family home was willed to the City of Hamilton after the death of the last of his five unmarried siblings in 1968. After its restoration was complete in 1971, Whitehern has been open as a civic museum and has occasionally served as a period film location. It was designated a National Historic Site of Canada in 1962.

The McQuesten neighbourhood in Hamilton is named after him. It is bounded by Barton Street East (north), Queenston Road (south), Parkdale Avenue North (west) and the Red Hill Valley Trail. Landmarks in this neighbourhood include the Red Hill Valley Parkway, Red Hill Valley Trail and Hillcrest Park.

McQuesten was awarded permanent, honorary membership at The Guild of Carillonneurs in North America in 1947, shortly before his death. The organization sought to recognize his work in overseeing the construction of the Rainbow Bridge, Rainbow Tower, and the tower's 55-bell carillon.

Thomas McQuesten is considered to be the founder of Royal Botanical Gardens (Ontario). Within RBG's headquarters building, RBG Centre, a large central foyer is named the T. B. McQuesten Theatre. A large plaque in the David Braley and Nancy Gordon Rock Garden also dedicates the garden to the memory of McQuesten. The formal Thomas Baker McQuesten Memorial is an elevated lookout platform along York Boulevard on RBG's Burlington Heights properties.
