= Hamilton-Wentworth =

Hamilton-Wentworth may refer to:

- Regional Municipality of Hamilton–Wentworth
- Hamilton—Wentworth (provincial electoral district)
- Hamilton—Wentworth (federal electoral district), Canadian federal electoral district (1968–1997)
