= List of tourist attractions in Hamilton, Ontario =

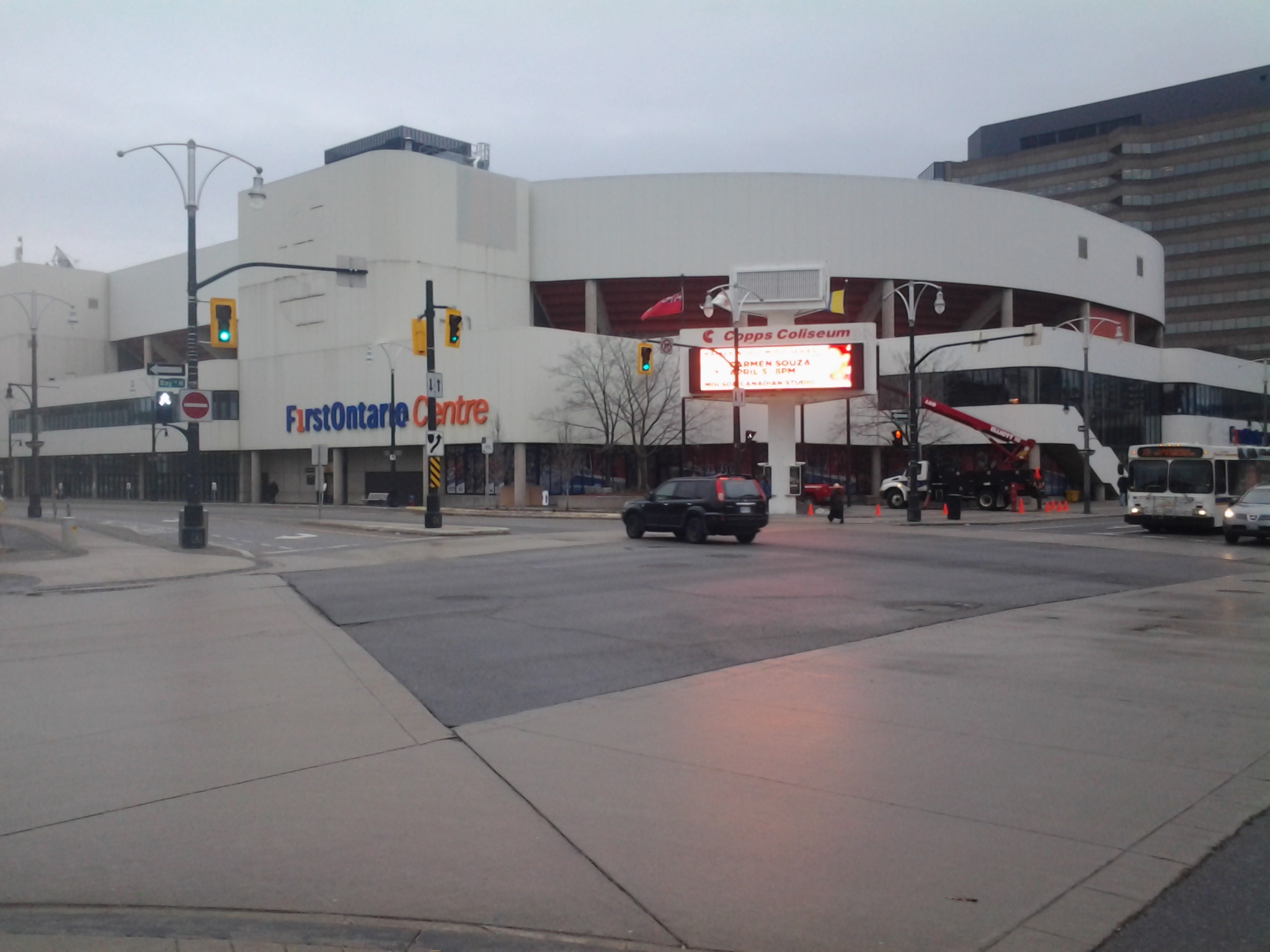
TD Coliseum

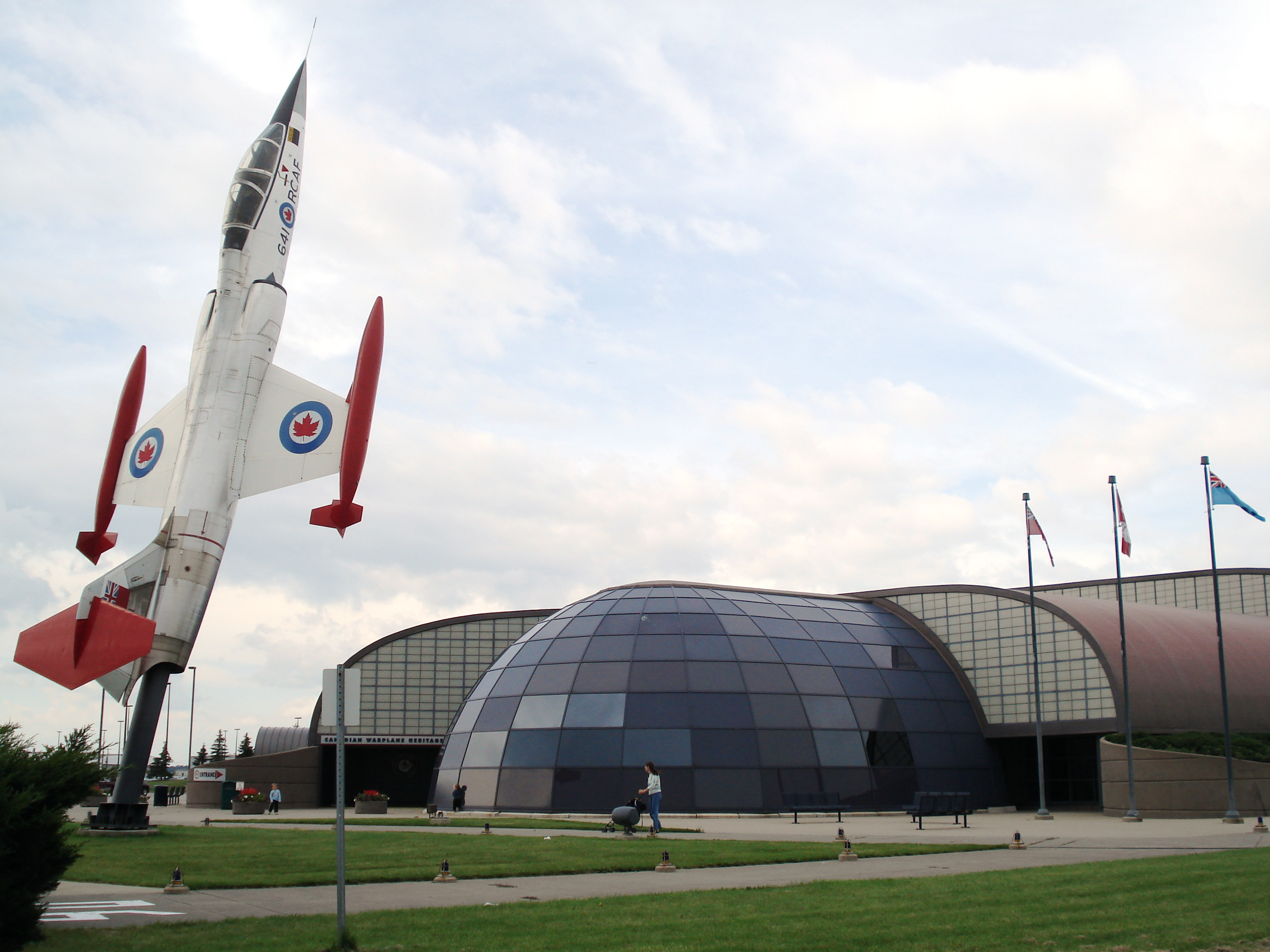
The Canadian Warplane Heritage Museum

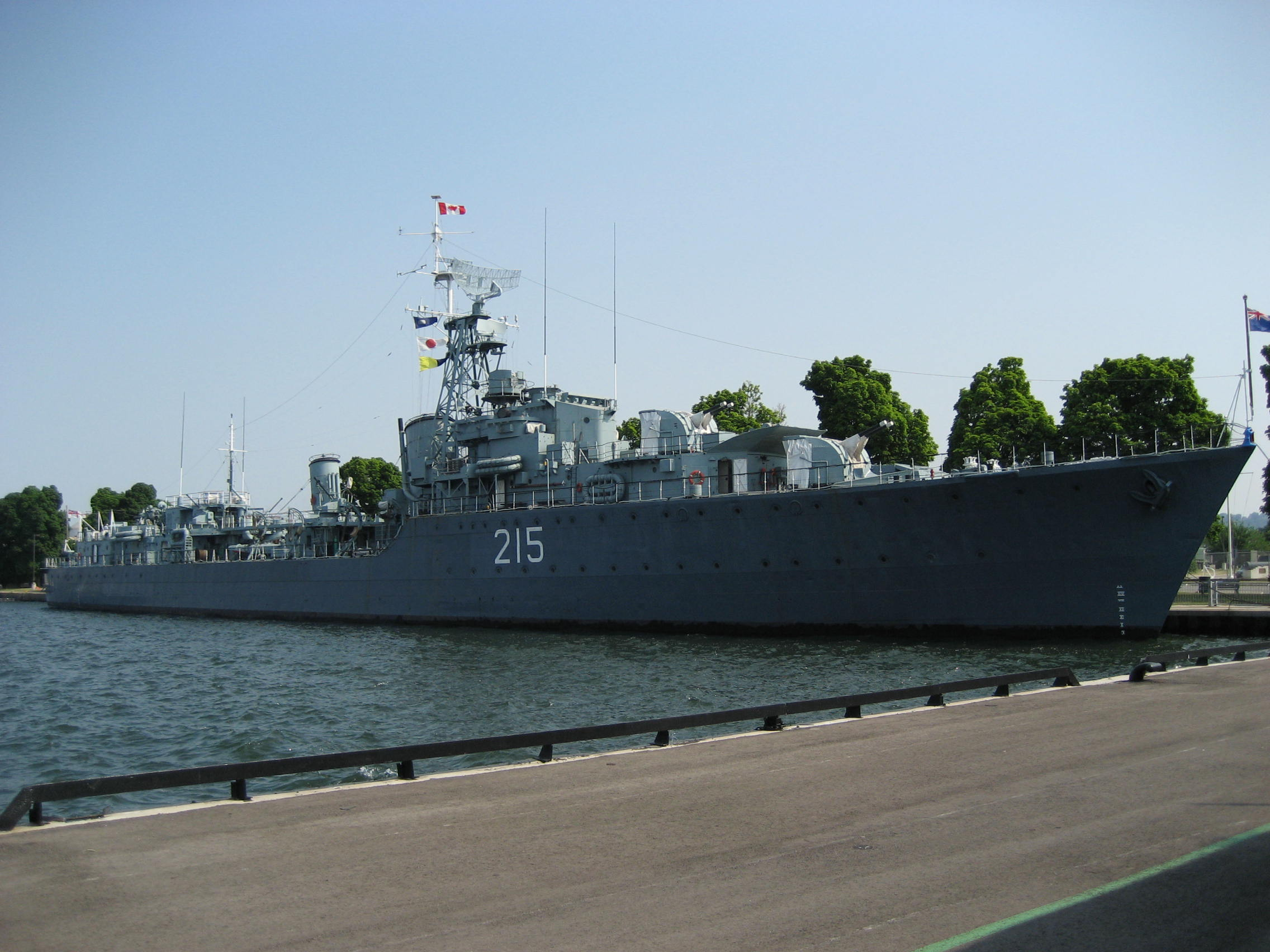
HMCS Haida, Pier 9, Hamilton, Ontario

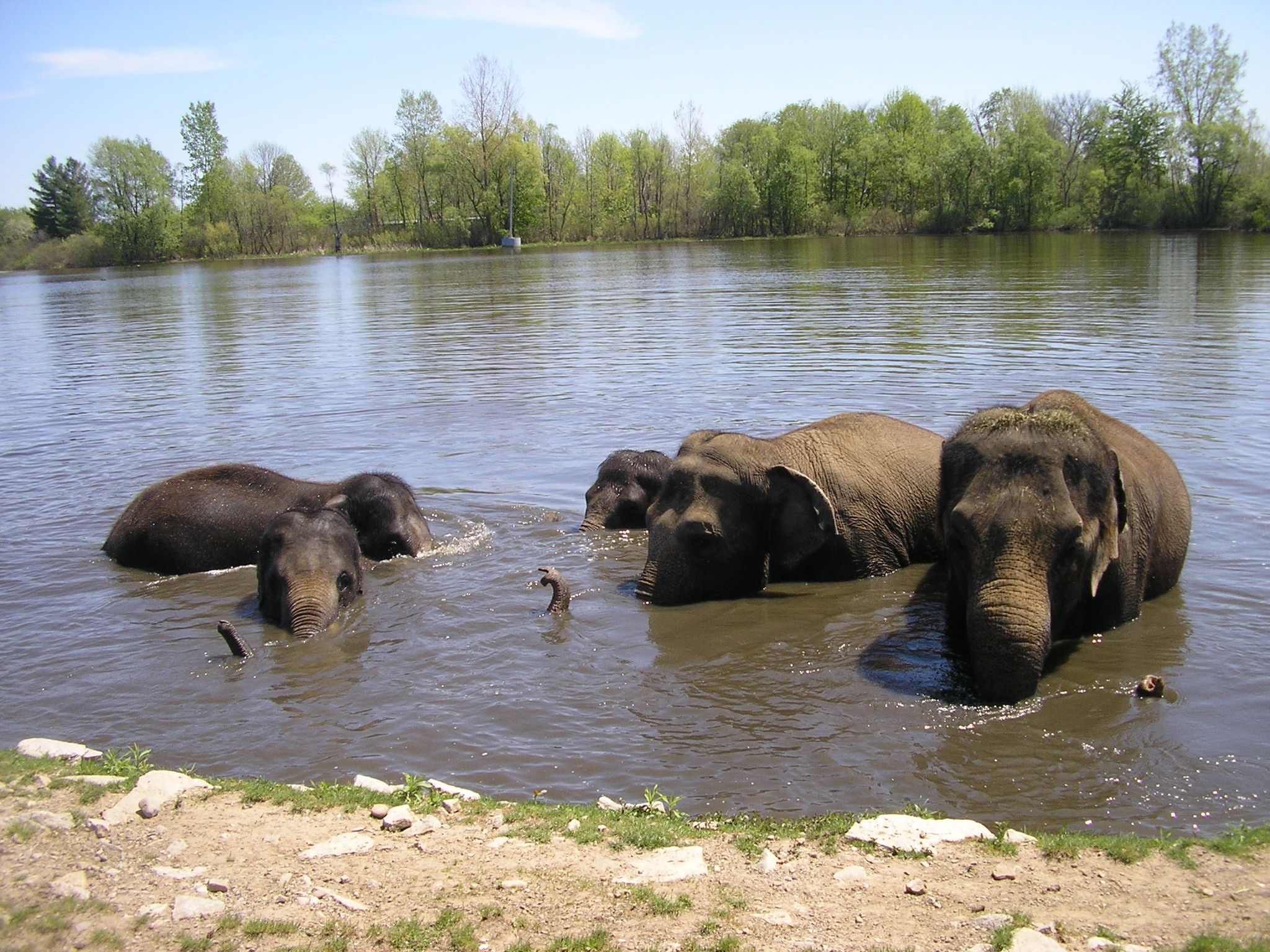
Elephants at African Lion Safari

Hamilton, Ontario has a large variety of historical sites, cultural and educational institutions, and an aviary for exotic birds.

== Historical sites and museums ==
- 31 Service Battalion Museum, accredited military museum, Heritage Museum; dedicated to documenting Combat Service Support in Hamilton; largest collection of the Canadian Women's Army Corps artifacts; located next to HMCS Haida
- Auchmar, historic estate of the Honourable Isaac Buchanan
- Battlefield House Museum, Stoney Creek
- Canadian Warplane Heritage Museum, home of one of the last two remaining operational Lancaster bombers; also in operation Spitfire, Hawker Hurricane, Bristol Bolingbroke
- Dundurn Castle, including the Hamilton Military Museum and Dundurn Park, west end; home of Sir Allan Napier MacNab, former Prime Minister of Upper Canada
- Erland Lee Museum, birthplace of Women's Institutes, Upper Stoney Creek
- Hamilton Children's Museum, east end
- Hamilton Farmer's Market, founded in 1837
- Hamilton Museum of Steam and Technology, east end
- HMCS Haida, National Historic Site, historic naval ship; Canada's most famous warship and the last remaining Tribal Class destroyer in the world
- Nash-Jackson House, at Stoney Creek Battlefield Park
- Ottawa Street North, textile district, voted one of Canada's favourite streets in the 2011 'Great Places in Canada' contest; ranked in Top 5 spots for antique shopping in Canada by CAA Magazine
- Royal Hamilton Light Infantry Heritage Museum, downtown
- Westfield Heritage Village, Flamborough
- Whitehern Historic House & Garden, downtown

== Cultural institutions ==
=== Art ===
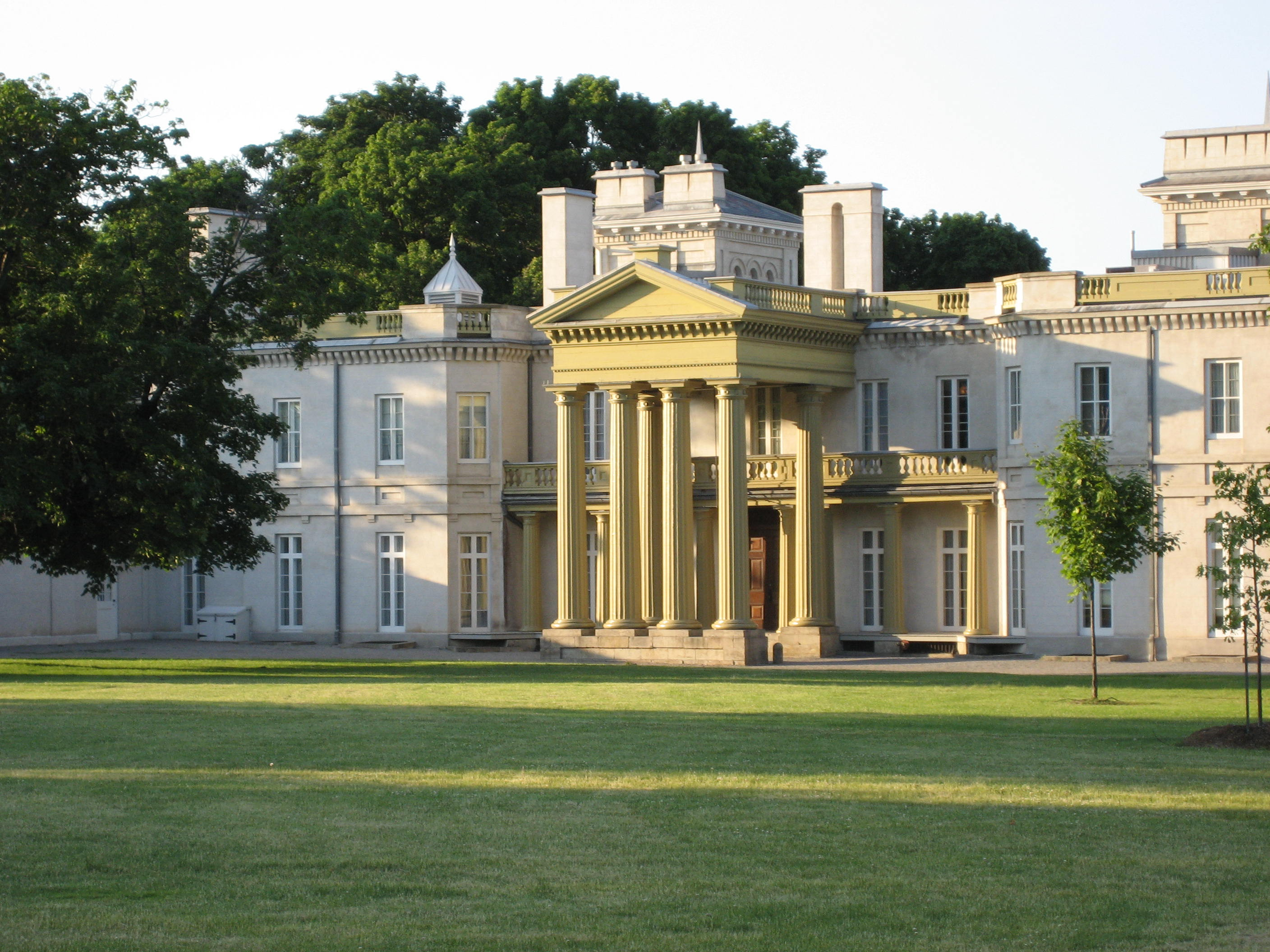
Dundurn Castle at Dundurn Park (summer)

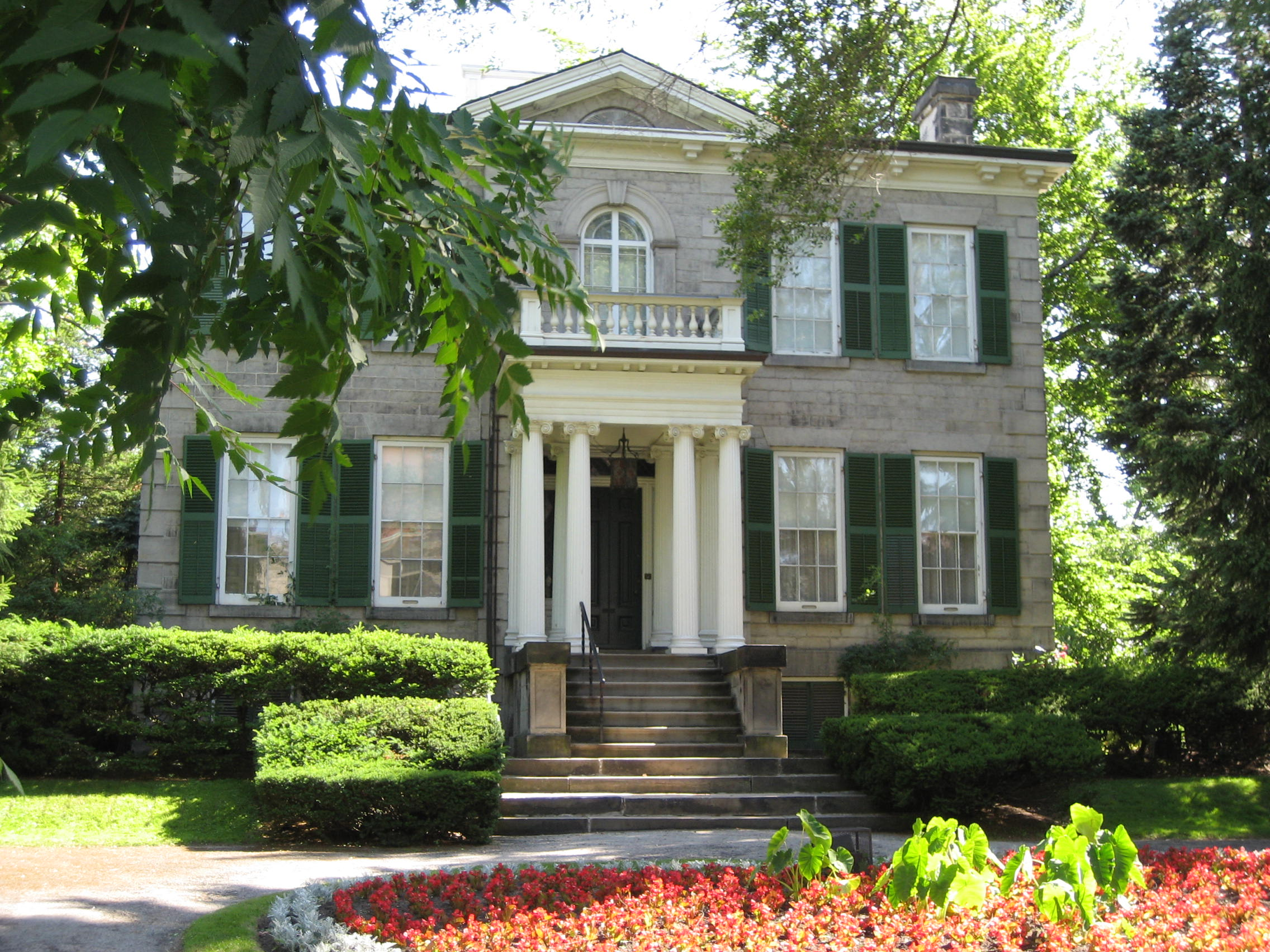
Whitehern Museum

- Cotton Factory
- Arctic Experience McNaught Gallery
- Art Gallery of Hamilton, downtown; second largest permanent collection in Ontario, and third largest in Canada
- James Street North Art District
- McMaster Museum of Art, west end

=== Music ===
- Bach Elgar Choir
- Hamilton Philharmonic Orchestra
- Hess Village, commercial and entertainment hub in historic buildings

=== Theatre ===
- Hamilton Theatre Inc., musical theatre

== Other popular attractions ==
=== Festivals ===
- Festival of Friends, founded in 1975, the largest annual free music event in Canada

=== Sports ===
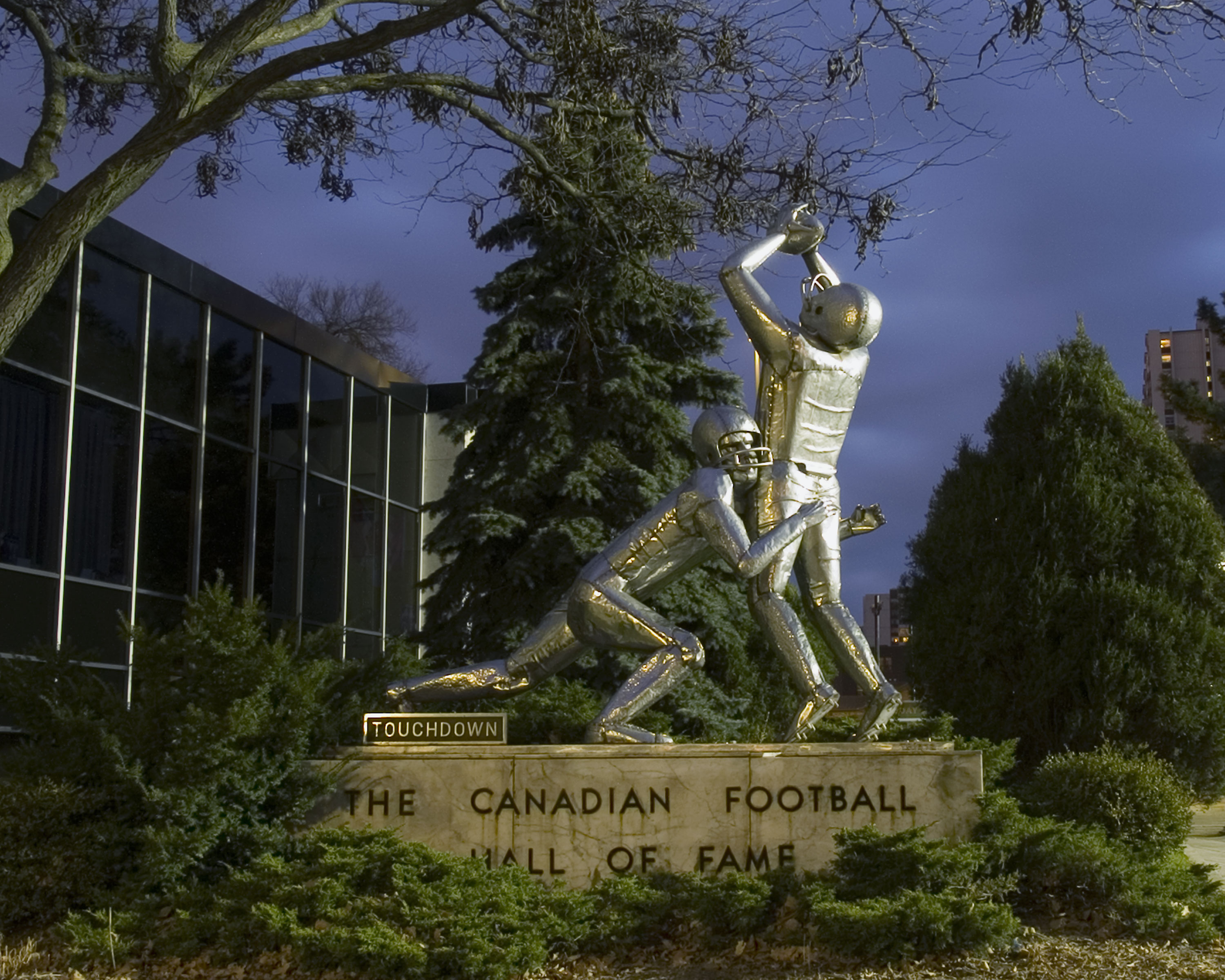
The Canadian Football Hall of Fame

- Around the Bay Road Race, the longest continuously held long-distance foot race in North America (since 1894)
- Canadian Football Hall of Fame, downtown
- CANUSA Games, Hamilton is twinned with Flint, Michigan, and its amateur athletes have competed in these games since 1958
- Jukasa Motor Speedway, a 5/8-mile oval auto racing track, Cayuga, Ontario
- Flamboro Downs and Flamboro Slots, horse racing as well as car racing

=== Parks, trails and waterfront ===
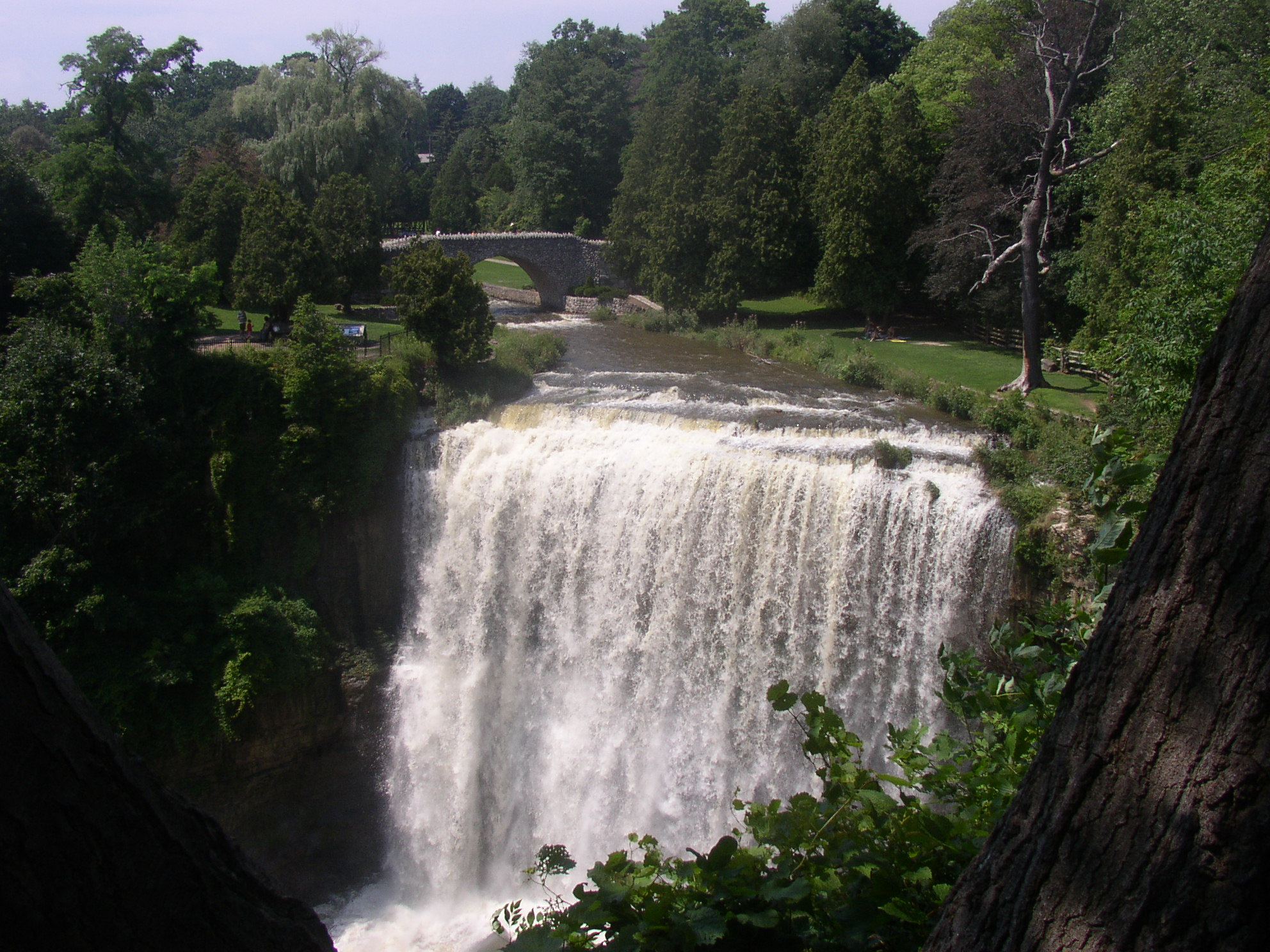
Webster's Falls

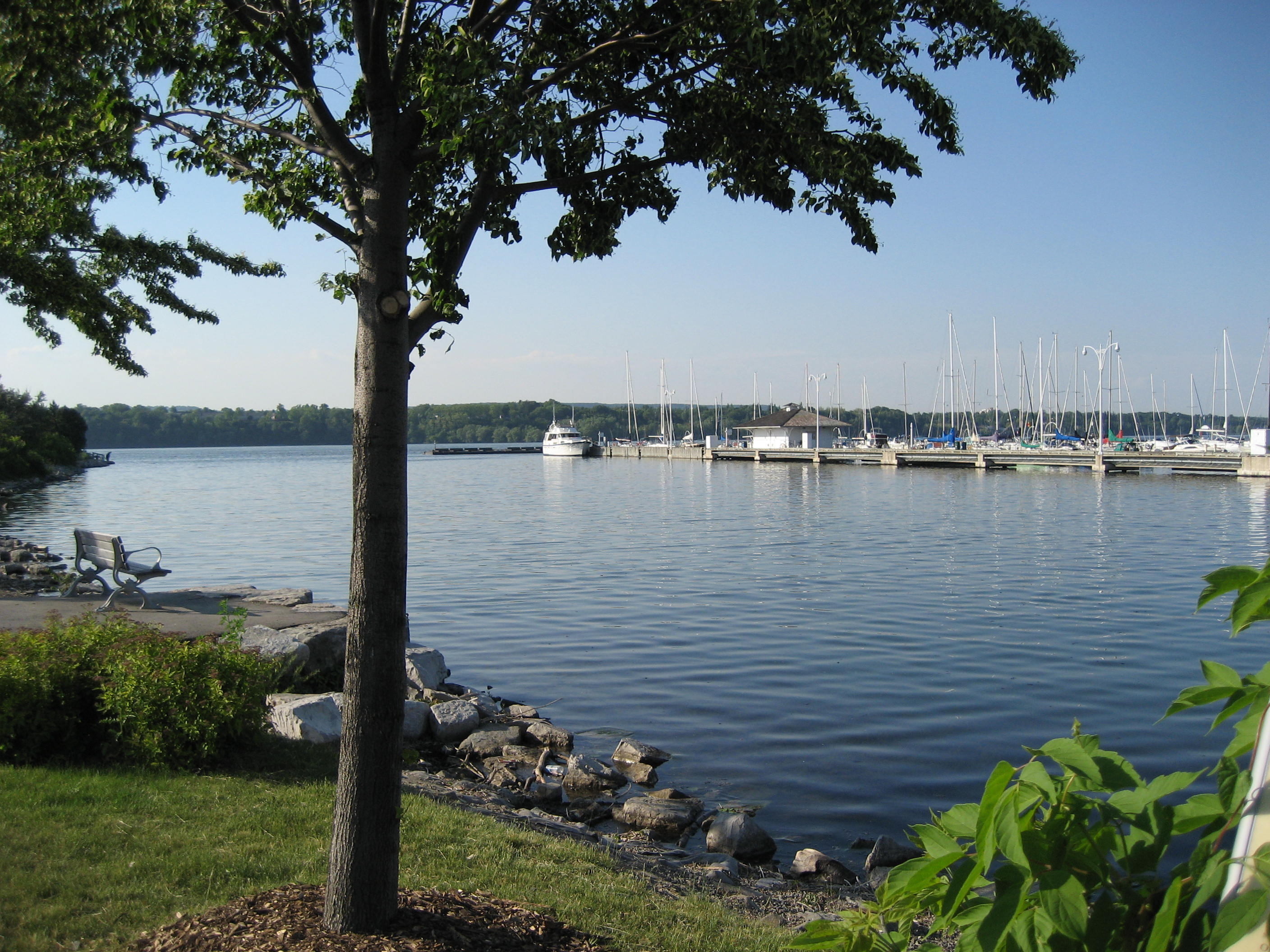
Pier 4 Park

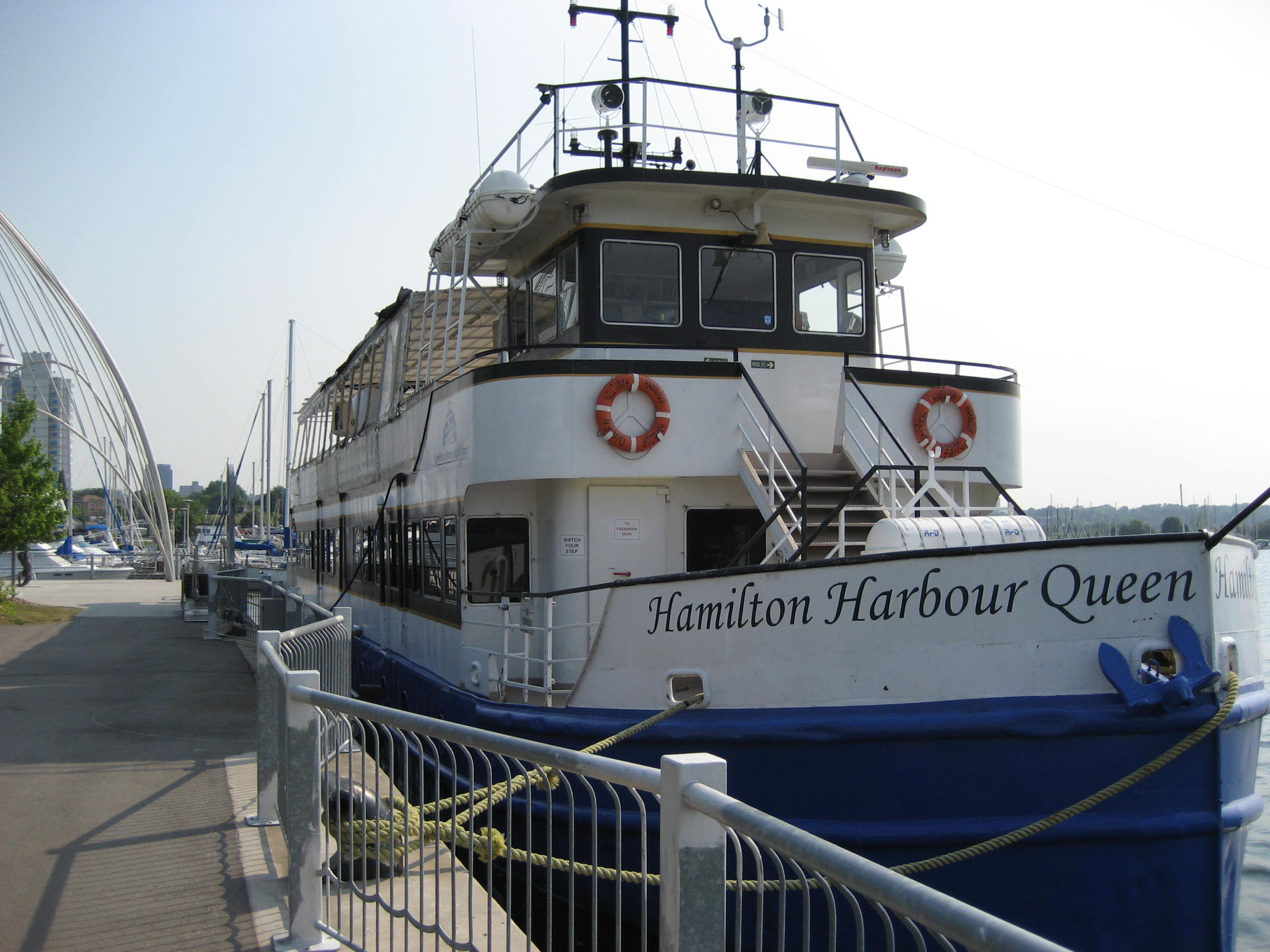
Hamilton Harbour Cruises via Hamilton Harbour Queen

- African Lion Safari, Flamborough
- Hamilton Aviary, Westdale, in Churchill Park along Cootes Paradise Sanctuary lookout trails
- Bayfront Park, Pier 4 Park, Harbour West, Cootes Paradise, waterfront trail
- Beach strip and lighthouse pier, beach trail
- Bruce Trail, Stoney Creek, Hamilton, Dundas, Flamborough
- Dundas Valley Conservation Area, Dundas
- Gage Park, large historical park in the middle of the city
- Hamilton Farmer's Market
- Pier 4 Park
- Royal Botanical Gardens, west end
- Westfield Heritage Village, Flamborough
