= Whitehern =

Coordinates: 43.2546°N 79.8721°W

Whitehern Historic House and Garden
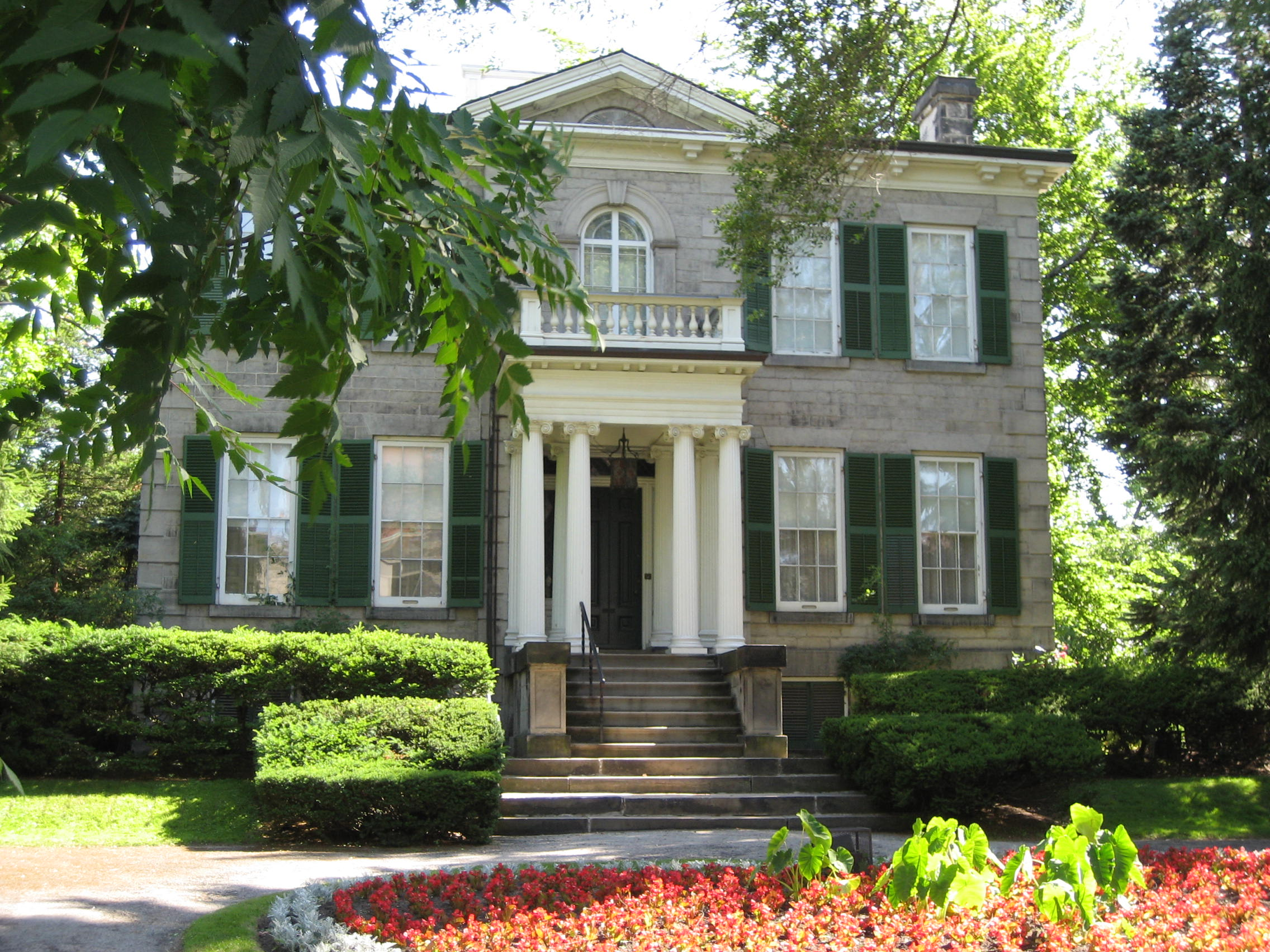
- Established: 1971
- Location: Hamilton, Ontario, Canada
- Type: historic house museum
- Website: www.hamilton.ca/whitehern

National Historic Site of Canada
- Designated: 1962

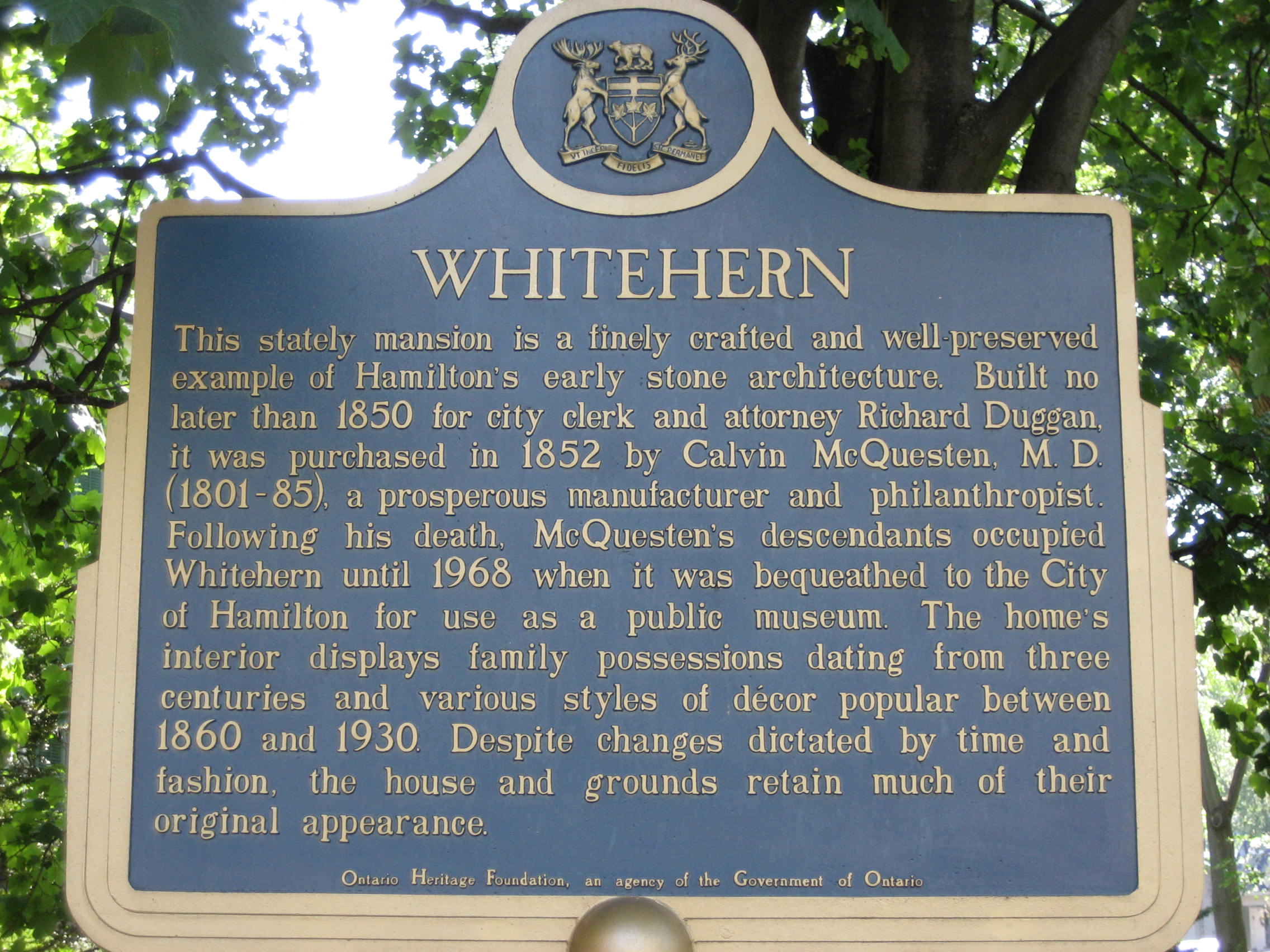
Whitehern museum plaque

Whitehern Historic House and Garden in Hamilton, Ontario, Canada, built shortly before 1850, is a Late Classical house that is now a historic house museum.

At one time, Whitehern was the home of the McQuesten family, including Mary Baker McQuesten and Thomas McQuesten. His historic downtown family home was willed to the City of Hamilton, after the death of the last of his five unmarried siblings in 1968. It is situated on the corner of Jackson Street West and MacNab Street South, just east of the Hamilton City Hall and behind the Canadian Football Hall of Fame museum. After its restoration was complete in 1971, Whitehern has been open as a civic museum owned and operated by the City of Hamilton, and has occasionally served as a period film location. It was designated a National Historic Site in 1962. A provincial historical marker was erected by the Ontario Heritage Trust to commemorate Whitehern.

Among the many Hamilton civic leaders and boosters, McQuesten helped encourage McMaster University to relocate from downtown Toronto to west Hamilton in 1930, and was instrumental in the creation of the Royal Botanical Gardens.

== Affiliations ==
The museum is affiliated with: CMA, CHIN, and Virtual Museum of Canada.

== See also ==
- List of attractions in Hamilton, Ontario
