= Westfield Heritage Village =

Open-air museum in Ontario, Canada

Coordinates: 43.320°N 80.1452°W

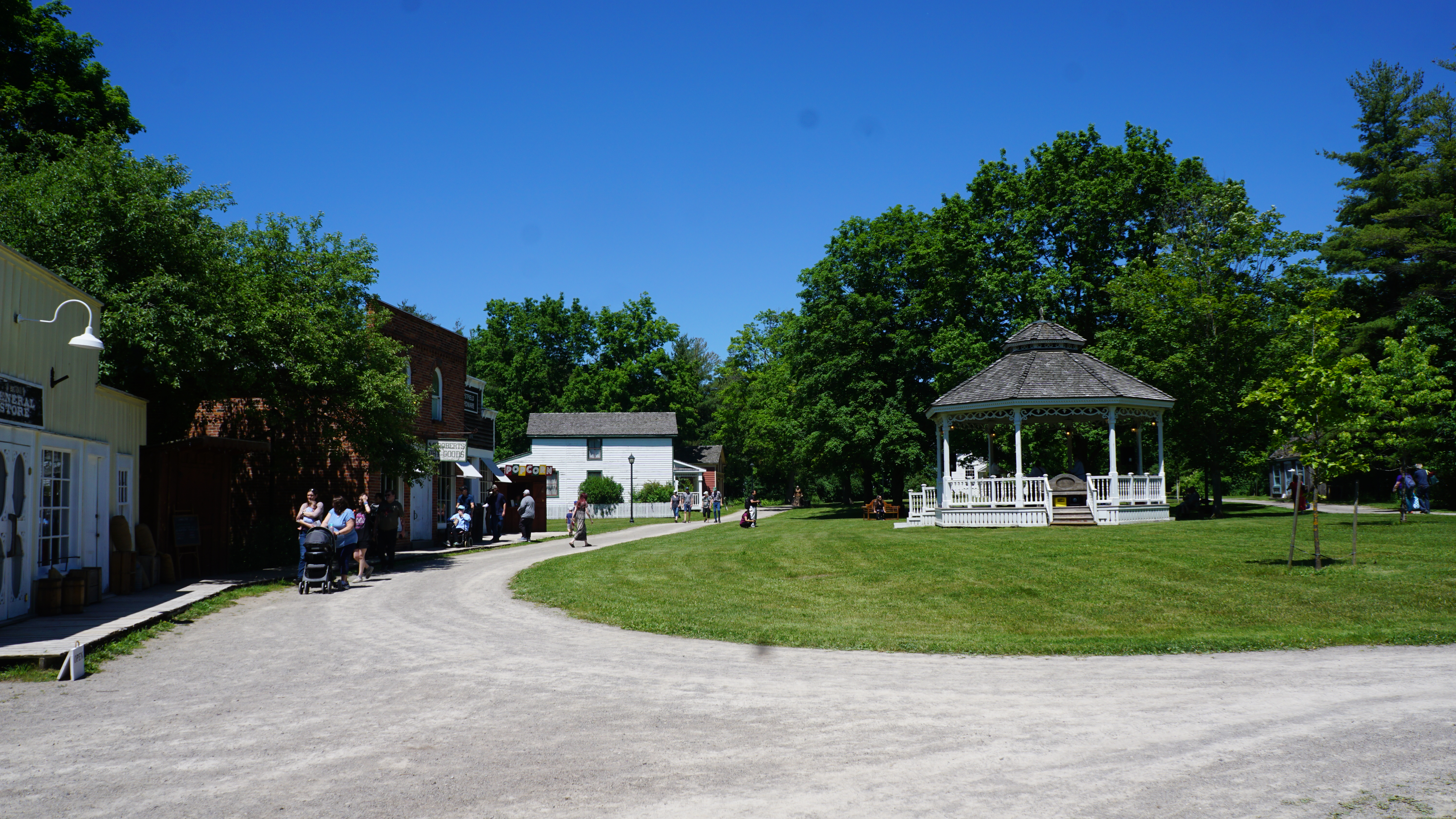
- Established: 1961
- Location: Rockton, Ontario, Canada.
- Type: open-air museum
- Website: www.westfieldheritage.ca/

The Westfield Heritage Village is a heritage centre located just west of Rockton, Ontario, Canada. The village contains over 30 historic buildings on a 3.4-square-kilometre (840-acre) site. It is operated by the Hamilton Conservation Authority.

== Brief history ==
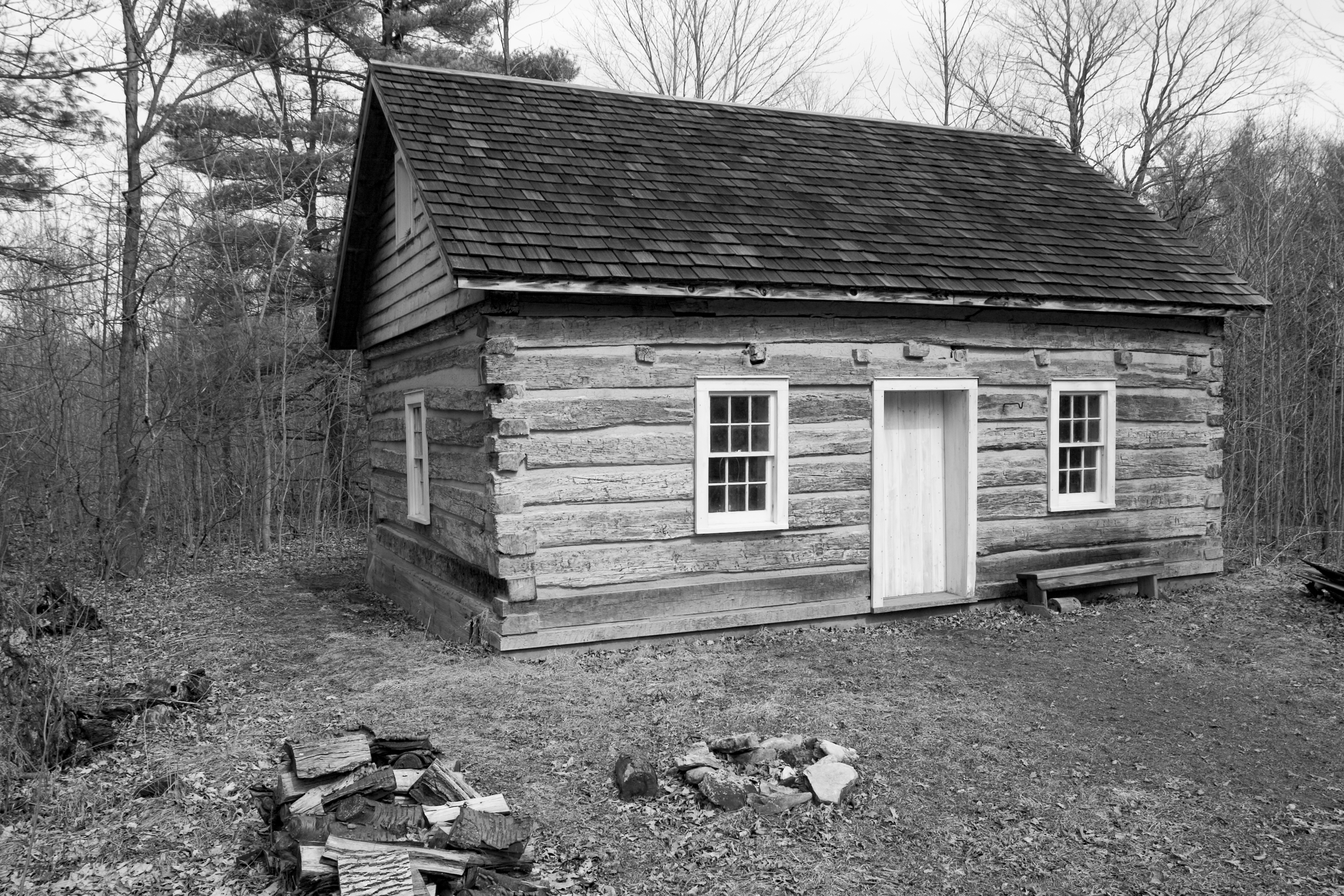
A log cabin in the Westfield Heritage Village.

In 1961, the Westfield Pioneer Village Association was established by two Brantford high school teachers, D. Glenn Kilmer and Golden Macdonnell, who purchased land near Rockton, Ontario, using their own money. Doreen Kilmer, a teacher and wife of Glenn Kilmer wasn't part of the Association. However, she participated equally in the development and management of Westfield. It acquired the original 30 acres (120,000 m^{2}) of land. Their goal was to save heritage buildings that were in danger of being destroyed and also to create a hands-on educational facility to teach pioneer life. Glenn Kilmer's father had been a builder and owner of Kilmer Lumber Company in Aylmer Ontario (subsequently sold to Beaver Lumber Co). Golden Macdonnell was a science teacher who had a keen interest in the history of Ontario. Both men were able to reconstruct the donated buildings which arrived at Westfield. Golden built the forges from fieldstone on the site and Doreen managed the General Store. The original name of the facility was the Westfield Pioneer Village. The Village unofficially opened in June 1963 and officially opened in 1964. Westfield Village was open to the public on weekends in June, September and October and during the summer holidays, seven days a week from 10:00 a.m to 5:00 pm. It provided jobs for students as well as ladies in the area who operated school tours. There were 12 buildings open at this time staffed by students.

In May 1968 the former Wentworth County purchased the village for CAD $32,700. Ownership transferred to the Wentworth County on November 1, 1968.

The name was changed to Wentworth Heritage Village in 1981 because much of the collection was not of the pioneer era.

The village ceased operation on September 3, 1984 due to a financial crisis. Over the next few years various ideas were discussed ranging from moving the facility to creating a theme park.

Starting in 1985, several scenes from the Anne of Green Gables movie series were shot in the village. Including buildings such as the saw mill, church, train station and general store.

A five-year redevelopment began in 1990. The goal was to create a "special events theme centre" and the facility was renamed the Westfield Heritage Centre.

In 2010 the village received a substantial grant from the TD (Toronto Dominion) bank to plant several groves of fruit trees and construct two beehives. As of May 2010 one was in operation and awaiting the arrival of more bees to enlarge the colony. A second beehive is being planned. The aim of the apiary program is to illustrate the importance of the European honey bee (Apius Mellifera ) to the settlers and to raise awareness for Colony Collapse Disorder (CCD) .

== Affiliations ==
The Museum is affiliated with: CMA, CHIN, and Virtual Museum of Canada.

== See also ==
- List of tourist attractions in Hamilton, Ontario
