= Mary Baker McQuesten =

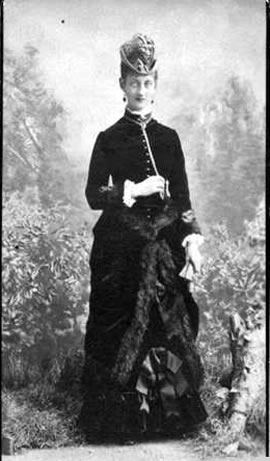
- Born: Mary Jane Baker; October 10, 1849; Brantford, Ontario
- Died: December 7, 1934 (aged 85); Hamilton, Ontario
- Other name: M. B. McQuesten
- Spouse: Isaac Baldwin McQuesten
- Children: 7 including Thomas Baker McQuesten

Mary Baker McQuesten (October 10, 1849 – December 7, 1934) was a Victorian-era Canadian letter writer and activist. She was the mother of politician Thomas McQuesten.

== Biography ==
McQuesten was born Mary Jane Baker on October 10, 1849 in Brantford in what was then Upper Canada to parents Reverend Thomas Baker and Mary Jane McIlwaine. She attended Newmarket County Grammar School and later Mrs. Burns' Ladies Collegiate Institute in Toronto. McQuesten never received a formal university education.

Mary met Isaac Baldwin McQuesten in 1869. The two married on June 18, 1873, though Mary broke off the engagement at least once. Their eldest child, Mary Baldwin McQuesten, was born in 1874. The couple had six more children between 1876 and 1885: Calvin, Hilda-Belle, Ruby Baker, Muriel Fletcher, Thomas Baker, and Margaret Edna. Muriel Fletcher only lived to 21 months, dying in 1882.

Following the death of his father in 1885, Isaac McQuesten inherited Willowbank House and the McQuesten family moved in. Mary McQuesten changed the name of the house to Whitehern.

In 1882, McQuesten was elected to the board of the Women's Foreign Missionary Society. She was elected president of the society in 1893. In 1898, McQuesten helped to form the Woman's Home Missionary Society which helped to minister to people, especially those involved in the gold rush, in the Canadian north and northwest. Despite McQuesten's opposition, the Women's Foreign Missionary Society and the Woman's Home Missionary Society merged in 1914 to become the Women's Missionary Society.

Isaac McQuesten died in 1888 leaving Mary McQuesten a single mother of six children between the ages of 2 and 14. Isaac was an alcoholic and his death was rumoured to have been a suicide. His death left the McQuesten family in severe debt.

In 1889, McQuesten proposed the founding of a chapter of the YWCA in Hamilton. The Hamilton YWCA Building opened on May 1, 1889. McQuesten was a member of several other religious women's institutions including the National Council of Women and the Victorian Order of Nurses. Despite these feminist leanings, McQuesten was never publicly associated with the women's suffrage movement.

McQuesten was a devout Presbyterian her entire life. In 1923, she spoke out against church union. Her Presbyterian church, Hamilton Presbytery, similarly resisted joining the United Church.

On December 7, 1934, McQuesten died of a cerebral hemorrhage.

== Legacy ==
McQuesten's letters have been influential in Canadian humanities and social studies. The letters demonstrate the ways in which letter writing could keep distant family members aware of each other's lives in the Victorian era. The letters also provide insight into the life of a single Victorian mother and into post-colonial Victorian attitudes. McQuesten's collected writings, including missionary texts and letters, have been compiled with a biography by Mary J. Anderson called The Life Writings of Mary Baker McQuesten: Victorian Matriarch.

McQuesten's former home is now preserved as a museum, the Whitehern Historic House and Garden, in Hamilton.
