= Frederick Wilson Warren =

Canadian architect and politician

Frederick Wilson Warren (October 8, 1887 – 1959) was a Canadian architect and politician in Hamilton, Ontario, Canada. He was a member of the Co-operative Commonwealth Federation, and served as the member of provincial parliament in the electoral district of Hamilton—Wentworth from August 1943 until March 1945.
