= Hamilton—Wentworth (provincial electoral district) =

Former provincial electoral district in Ontario, Canada

Ontario electoral district

Defunct provincial electoral district
- Legislature: Legislative Assembly of Ontario
- District created: 1934
- District abolished: 1999
- First contested: 1934
- Last contested: 1995

Hamilton—Wentworth was a provincial electoral district in Ontario, Canada. It was represented in the Legislative Assembly of Ontario from 1934 to 1971.

== Members of Provincial Parliament ==
Hamilton—Wentworth
Assembly	Years	Member	Party
19th	1934–1937	Thomas McQuesten	Liberal
20th	1937–1943	Thomas McQuesten	Liberal
21st	1943–1945	Frederick Wilson Warren	Co-operative Commonwealth
22nd	1945–1948	Russell Kelly	Liberal
23rd	1948–1951	Russell Kelly	Liberal
24th	1951–1955	Ray Connell	Progressive Conservative
25th	1955–1959	Ray Connell	Progressive Conservative
26th	1959–1963	Ray Connell	Progressive Conservative
27th	1963–1967	Ray Connell	Progressive Conservative
28th	1967–1971	Ray Connell	Progressive Conservative
Sourced from the Ontario Legislative Assembly

== Election results ==
1963 Ontario general election
Party	Candidate	Votes	%	±%
Progressive Conservative	Ray Connell	13,642	63.20	+6.65
Liberal	Jacob Goetz	4,431	20.53	–3.79
New Democratic	Harold W. Van Oene	3,511	16.27	–2.86
Total valid votes		21,584	99.23	
Total rejected ballots		168	0.77	–0.23
Turnout		21,752	61.37	+4.40
Eligible voters		35,442		
Progressive Conservative hold		Swing		+5.22
Source: Elections Ontario

1959 Ontario general election
Party	Candidate	Votes	%	±%
Progressive Conservative	Ray Connell	10,453	56.55	–2.13
Liberal	George Kemp	4,495	24.32	–0.05
Co-operative Commonwealth	Orville Kerr	3,535	19.13	+4.31
Total valid votes		18,483	99.00	
Total rejected ballots		187	1.00	–0.44
Turnout		18,670	56.98	–0.77
Eligible voters		32,767		
Progressive Conservative hold		Swing		–1.04
Source: Elections Ontario

1955 Ontario general election
Party	Candidate	Votes	%	±%
Progressive Conservative	Ray Connell	9,769	58.69	+3.11
Liberal	George Kemp	4,056	24.37	+0.64
Co-operative Commonwealth	Evan Mathias	2,467	14.82	–5.87
Labor–Progressive	James F. McDonald	354	2.13	–
Total valid votes		16,646	98.56	
Total rejected ballots		244	1.44	+0.53
Turnout		16,890	57.75	–5.33
Eligible voters		29,248		
Progressive Conservative hold		Swing		+1.23
Source: Elections Ontario

1951 Ontario general election
Party	Candidate	Votes	%	±%
Progressive Conservative	Ray Connell	11,865	55.58	+9.16
Liberal	Francis S. Weatherston	5,065	23.73	–1.52
Co-operative Commonwealth	Isaac Reginald Gardiner	4,417	20.69	–7.64
Total valid votes		21,347	99.08	
Total rejected ballots		198	0.92	+0.06
Turnout		21,545	63.07	–6.04
Eligible voters		34,158		
Progressive Conservative hold		Swing		+5.34
Source: Elections Ontario

1948 Ontario general election
Party	Candidate	Votes	%	±%
Progressive Conservative	Russell Temple Kelley	10,542	46.42	+2.42
Co-operative Commonwealth	Frederick Wilson Warren	6,434	28.33	+1.99
Liberal	David Percy Cliff	5,734	25.25	–1.98
Total valid votes		22,710	99.14	
Total rejected ballots		197	0.86	+0.12
Turnout		22,907	69.12	–8.79
Eligible voters		33,142		
Progressive Conservative hold		Swing		+0.21
Source: Elections Ontario

1945 Ontario general election
Party	Candidate	Votes	%	±%
Progressive Conservative	Russell Temple Kelley	10,102	44.00	+11.02
Liberal	Thomas McQuesten	6,252	27.23	–3.51
Co-operative Commonwealth	Frederick Wilson Warren	6,047	26.34	–9.93
Labor–Progressive	Robert J. McClure	556	2.42	–
Total valid votes		22,957	99.26	
Total rejected ballots		172	0.74	+0.06
Turnout		23,129	77.91	+13.72
Eligible voters		29,686		
Progressive Conservative gain from Co-operative Commonwealth		Swing		+10.48
Source: Elections Ontario

1943 Ontario general election
Party	Candidate	Votes	%	±%
Co-operative Commonwealth	Frederick Wilson Warren	6,433	36.27	+28.72
Progressive Conservative	Russell Temple Kelley	5,850	32.98	+1.36
Liberal	Thomas McQuesten	5,453	30.75	–30.09
Total valid votes		17,736	99.32	
Total rejected ballots		122	0.68	–0.20
Turnout		17,858	64.19	–8.82
Eligible voters		27,820		
Co-operative Commonwealth gain from Liberal		Swing		+29.41
Source: Elections Ontario

1937 Ontario general election
Party	Candidate	Votes	%	±%
Liberal	Thomas McQuesten	11,559	60.83	+3.65
Conservative	Herbert Lansdowne Smye	6,009	31.62	–3.54
Co-operative Commonwealth	Leslie Brown Couldrey	1,434	7.55	–0.11
Total valid votes		19,002	99.12	
Total rejected ballots		169	0.88	–0.13
Turnout		19,171	73.01	–4.44
Eligible voters		26,257		
Liberal hold		Swing		+3.60
Source: Elections Ontario

1934 Ontario general election
Party	Candidate	Votes	%
Liberal	Thomas McQuesten	11,127	57.18
Conservative	Alex Laurence Shaver	6,843	35.16
Co-operative Commonwealth	Jane Barclay Evans	1,491	7.66
Total valid votes		19,461	98.99
Total rejected ballots		198	1.01
Turnout		19,659	77.45
Eligible voters		25,382	
Liberal pickup new district.			
Source: Elections Ontario

== See also ==
- List of Ontario provincial electoral districts
- Canadian provincial electoral districts
