= Hamilton Farmer's Market =

Coordinates: 43.25895°N 79.8700°W

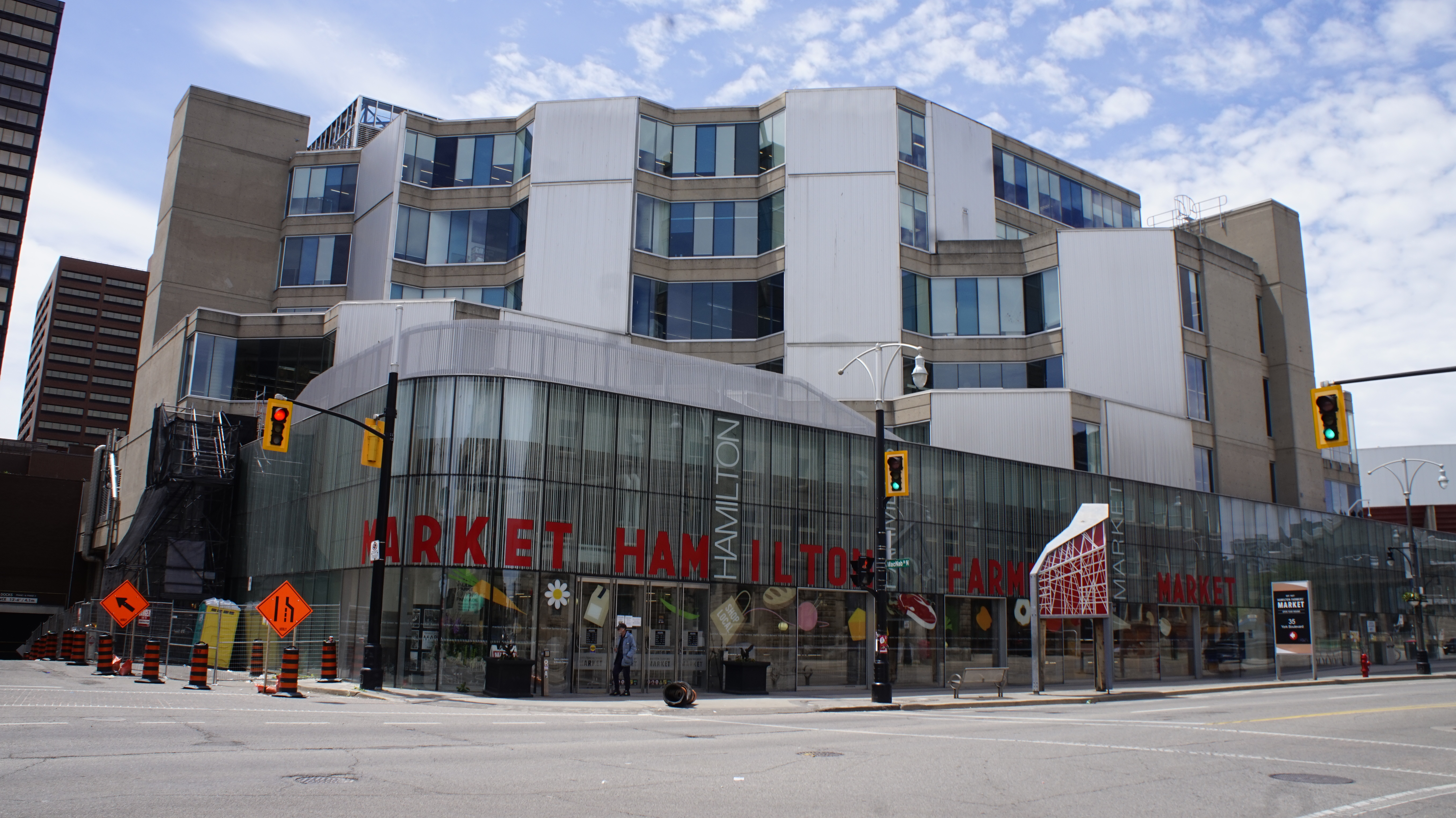

The Hamilton Farmers' Market was founded in 1837 is located within a large multi-faceted complex in downtown Hamilton, Ontario called Lloyd D. Jackson Square on the corner of James Street & York Boulevard. It is an indoor market known well by locals for its variety of foods and products, produced both locally and from around the world. In 2007 a proposal of $5.1-million for renovation was made.

== History ==
The Hamilton Farmers' Market is a heritage institution founded in 1837, at the corner of York & James Streets. Andrew and Mary Miller transferred a small parcel of land to the President and Board of Police of the Town of Hamilton, to be utilized specifically for a market.

The details of the land transfer are murky. The history of the Hamilton Farmers' Market, Michael Quigley's On the Market published by the Head of the Lake Historical Society in 1987 says, "The origins of the market lie in a tangled swamp of land speculation deals, political rivalries, sharp practices and legal chicanery among the principals, many of them revered founding fathers of Hamilton."

The market has been in its current location next to the Hamilton Public Library since August 1980.

In 2011, the market was completely renovated and now has:

- Wide mix of quality, affordable local produce and culturally diverse products from nearly 70 vendors.
- Selection of fresh foods prepared onsite.
- A community kitchen for cooking demonstrations and events
- Improved energy efficiency and accessibility
- Fully restored Birks Clock Of The Charging Horsemen hanging proudly in the centre of the market.

== Birks "Clock of the Charging Horsemen" ==
The historic 1930 clock formerly at Birks Building was located at the corner of James Street North and King Street West from 1986 to 2010. It has since been fully restored and relocated indoors at Farmers' Market. Every 15 minutes, the miniature knights joust as they rotate around the clock's base. The clock also chimes and plays music. The clock sounds very similar to a carillon.

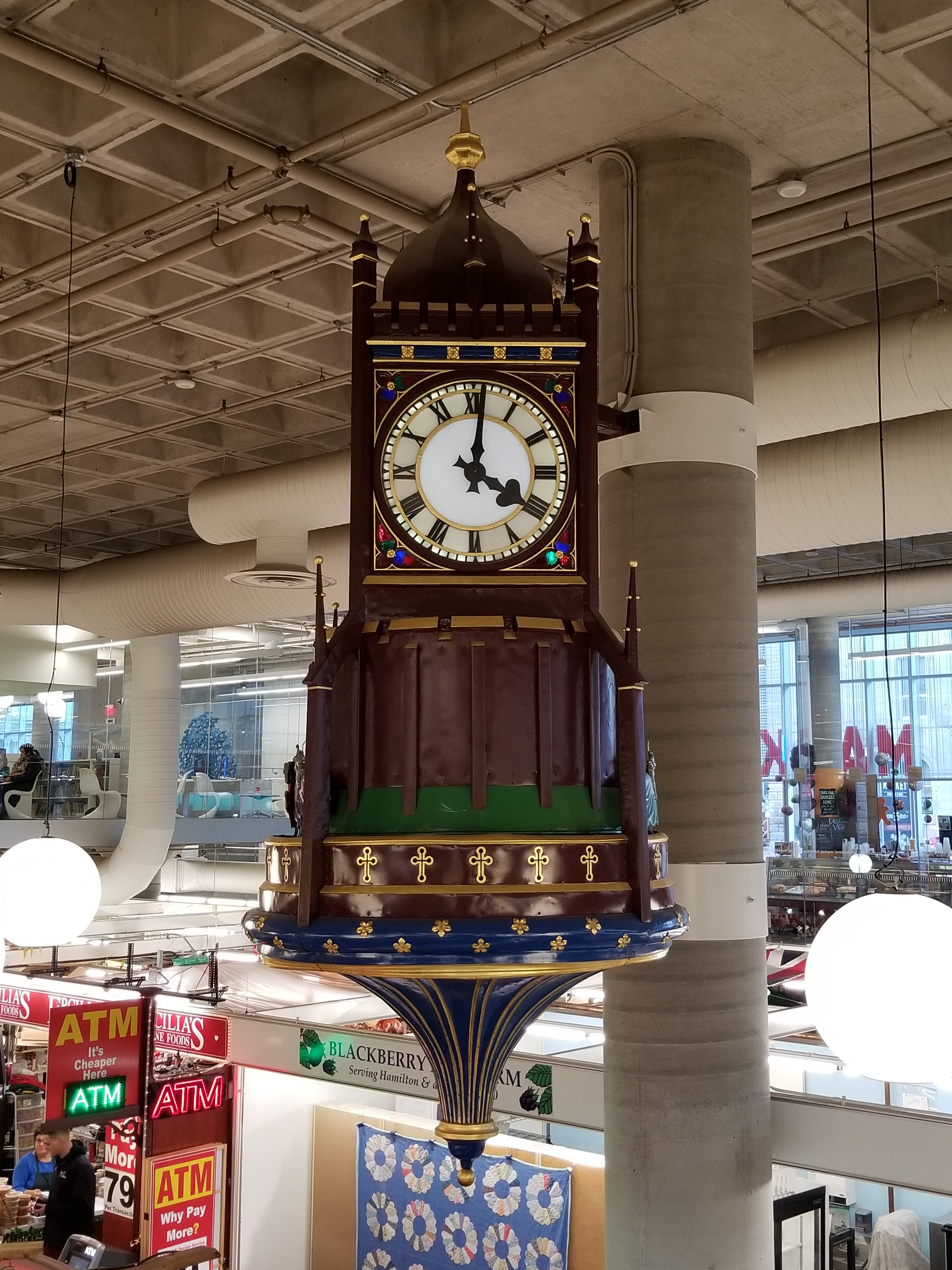
The Clock Of The Charging Horsemen, also known as the Birks Clock, located at the Hamilton Farmers' Market in Hamilton, Ontario, Canada.

== Images ==
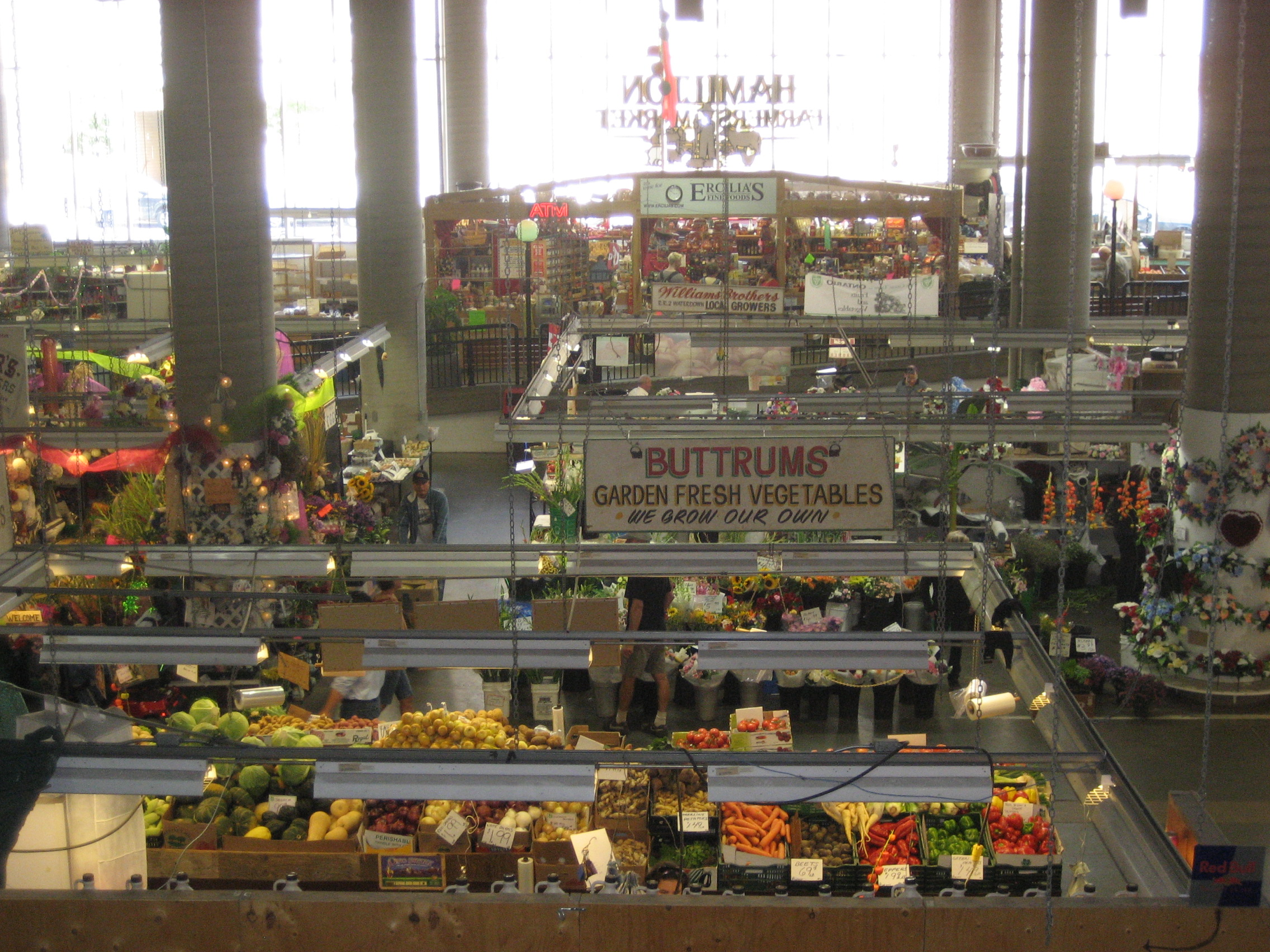

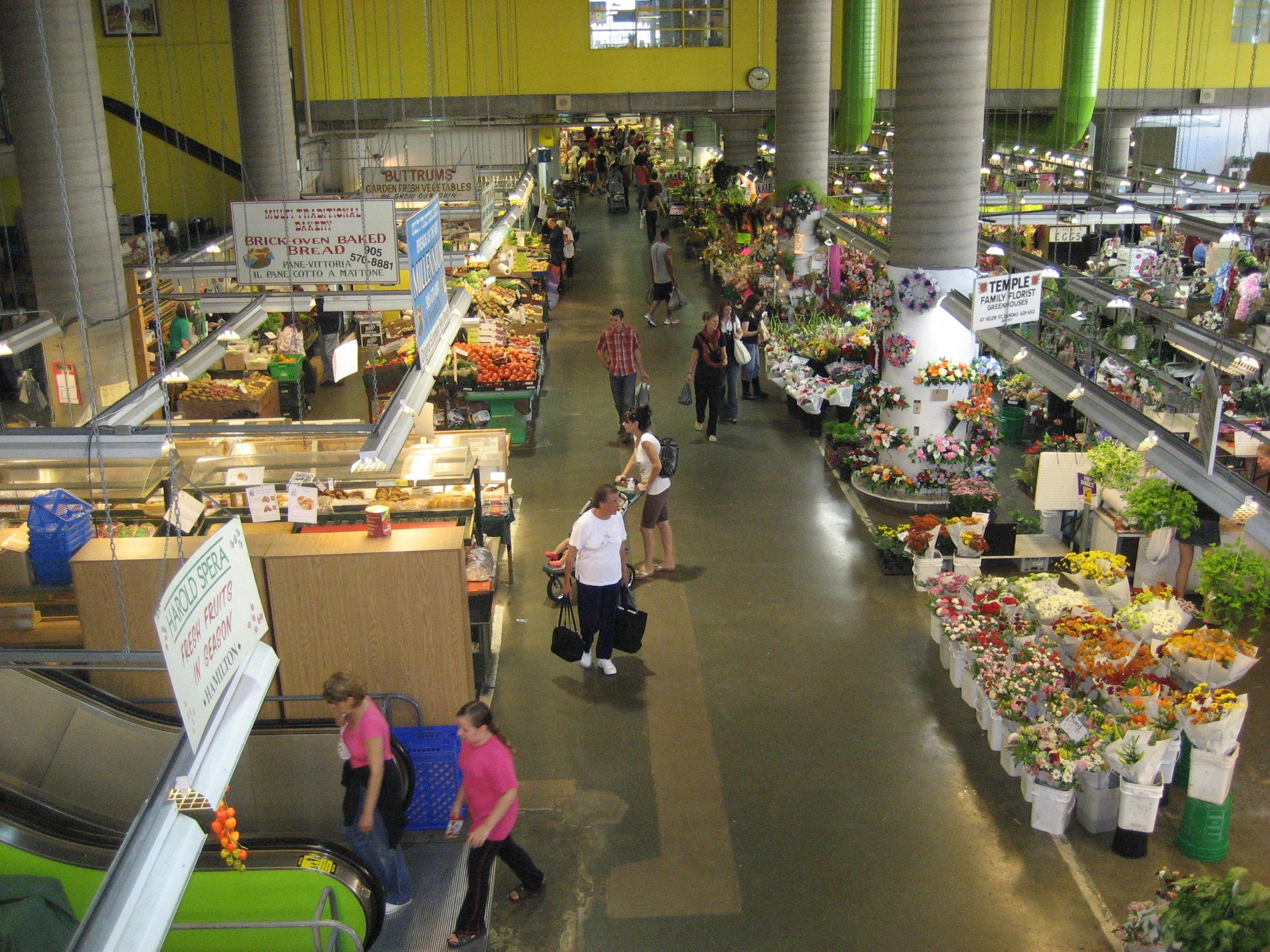

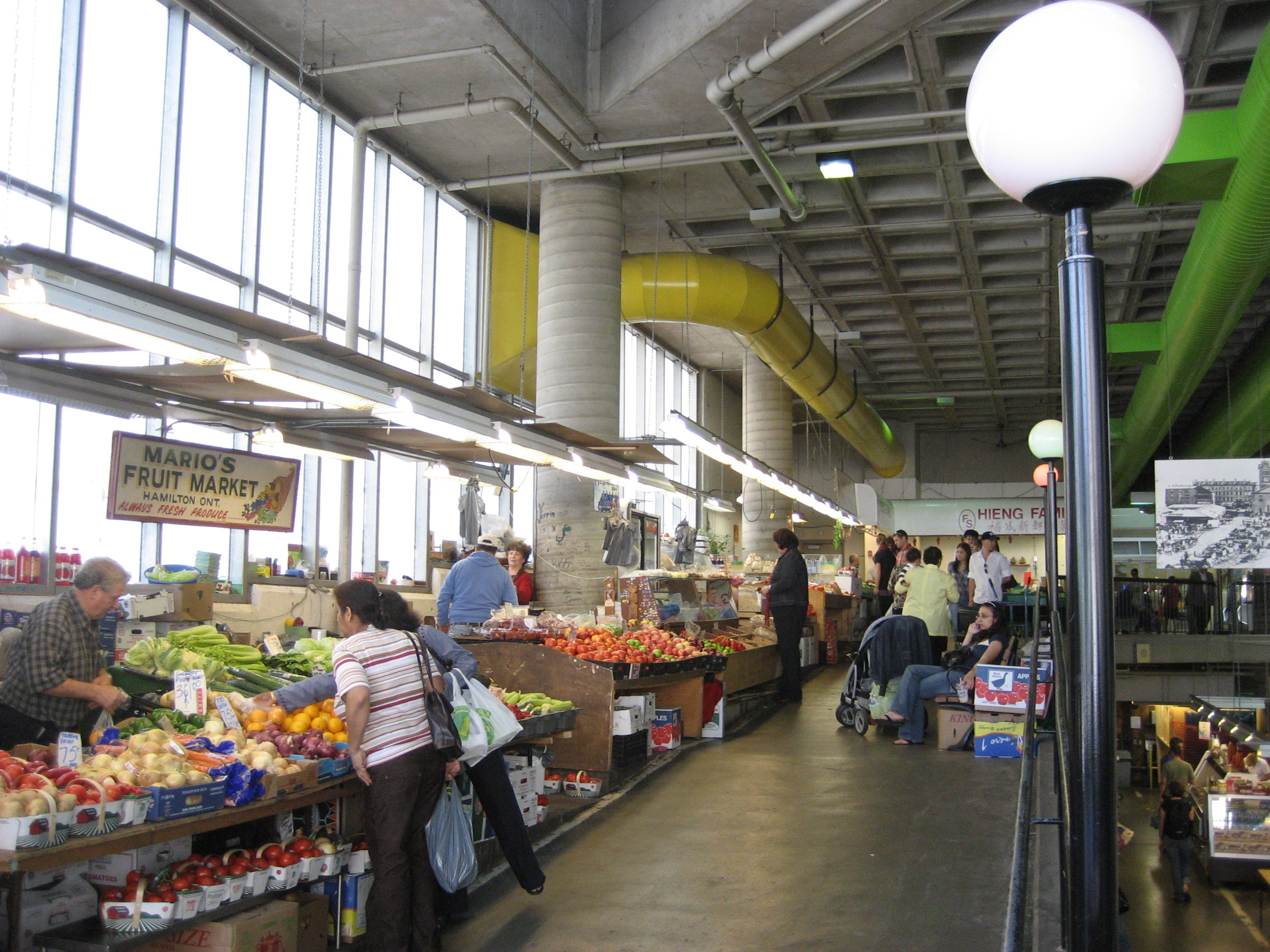

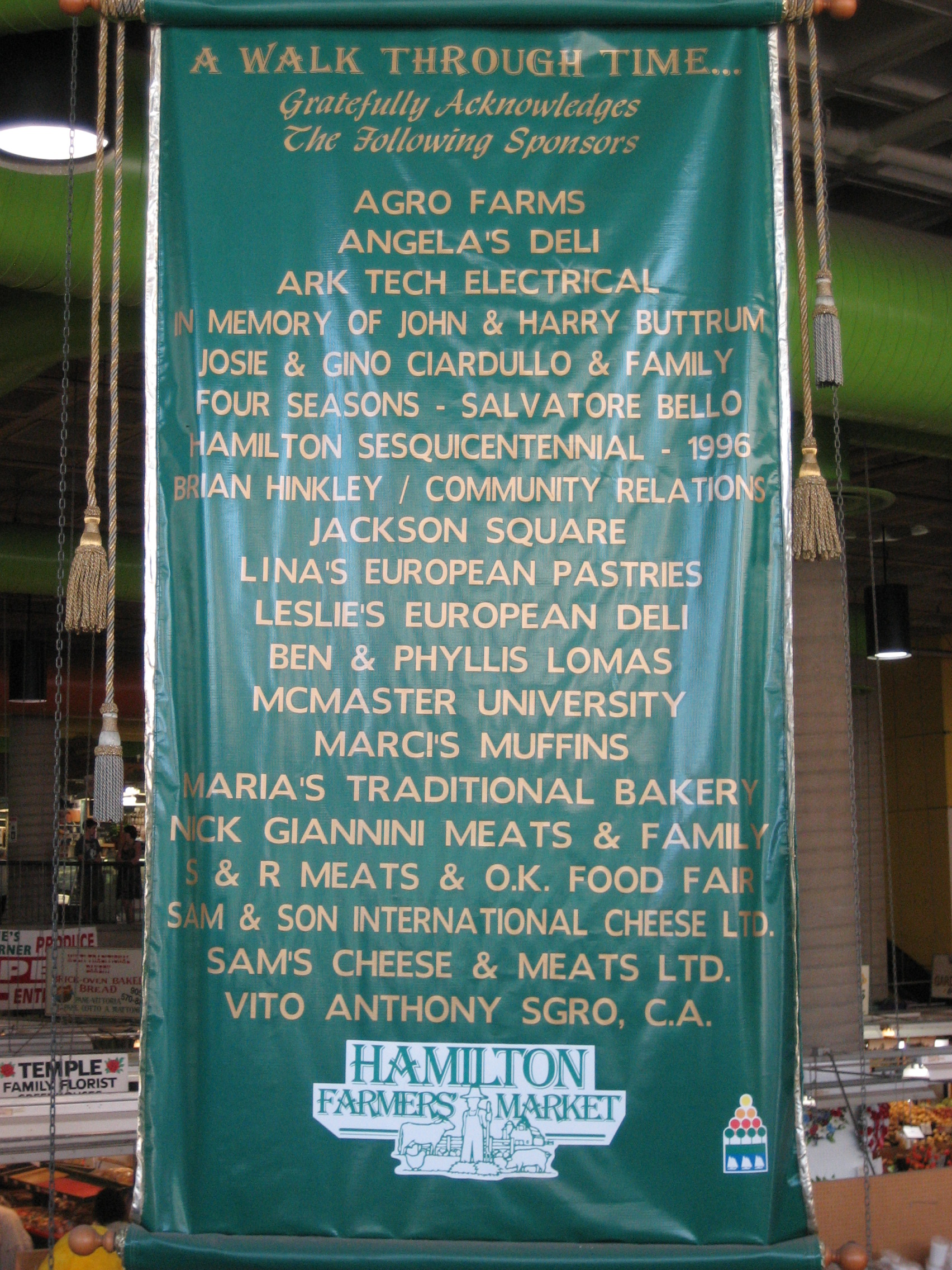
