= Chateau Royale (Hamilton, Ontario) =

Place in Hamilton, Ontario, Canada

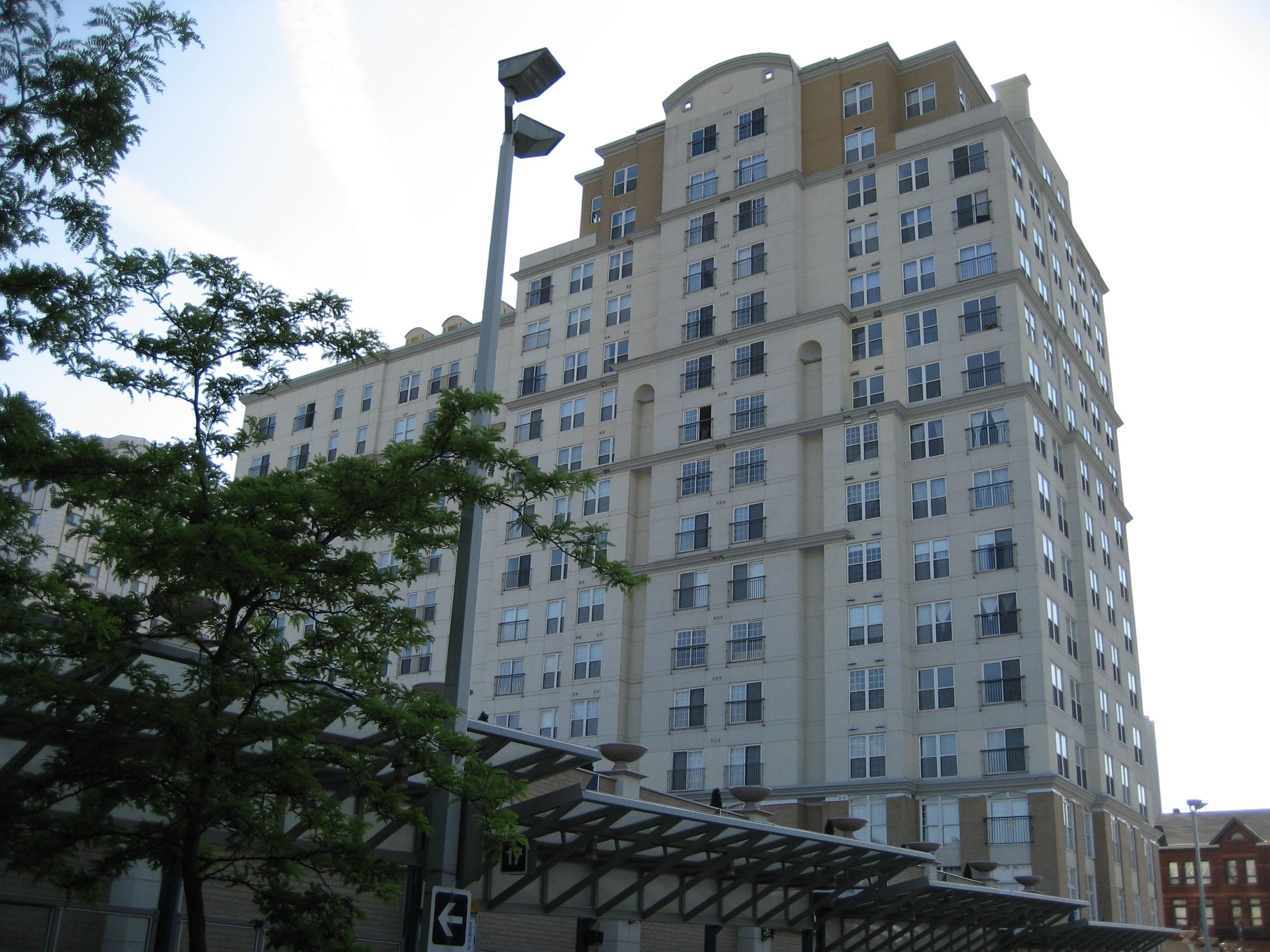
- Interactive map of the Chateau Royale area

General information
- Location: Hamilton, Ontario, Canada
- Coordinates: 43°15′09″N 79°52′13″W

Chateau Royale (formerly the Undermount Offices at Alexandra Square) is a mixed-use residential condominium and commercial complex located at 135 James Street South in Hamilton, Ontario, Canada. The property is situated adjacent to the Hamilton GO Centre in the city's downtown core.

The complex originally opened in 1966 as a modernist office development and was converted into residential condominium units in 2006. The site has a longer history as a commercial and entertainment hub known as "Alexandra Square", including the former Alexandra Roller Skating Rink.

== Site history ==
The block on which Chateau Royale stands developed gradually in the late 19th century as a working-class commercial area. Despite its proximity to major institutions such as St. Joseph's Hospital and the TH&B Railway Station, the site remained occupied by small-scale uses including a lumber yard, trades offices, and workers' cottages.

In 1906, part of the block was redeveloped into the Alexandra Roller Skating Rink, which became a popular venue for entertainment, music, and social gatherings. By the early 20th century, the surrounding block had evolved into a modest commercial hub, and the name "Alexandra Square" became informally associated with the area.

== Office development ==
Following the demolition of earlier structures on the site, the Undermount Office Complex at Alexandra Square opened in 1966. The development consisted of two modernist office towers clad in dark glass, constructed atop a parking podium with a rooftop plaza.

The complex represented a shift in land use in the area, replacing earlier entertainment and low-rise commercial buildings with mid-century office development adjacent to the TH&B station.

== Commercial activity ==
The Undermount Office Complex became an active social and commercial hub during its peak years, with ground-floor retail and hospitality uses serving office workers, hospital staff, and students.

Rose Symak, who began waitressing at age sixteen, joined the Undermount Bar & Grill in 1966 and remained there for nearly three decades. Initially expected to be a small, quiet restaurant, the establishment expanded significantly over time, growing from a single room into a large and popular venue occupying much of the building’s ground floor and rooftop plaza. It became a well-known gathering place for office workers, hospital staff, and students associated with nearby McMaster University and St. Joseph's Hospital, reflecting not only the city's sole downtown patio bars at the time but the building’s role as a lively social hub during its peak years.

== Decline ==
By the late 20th century, the Undermount Office Complex experienced declining occupancy as Hamilton's downtown office market weakened. Broader economic changes, including deindustrialization, shifting employment patterns, and increased suburban commercial development, contributed to reduced demand for office space in the downtown core.

In September 1993, long-time waitress Rose Symak retired from the Undermount Bar & Grill after nearly three decades of service. Her departure was noted by patrons as marking a shift in the establishment; one long-time customer remarked that "it will certainly be different" without her presence.

Throughout the 1990s, the complex suffered from high vacancy rates and declining maintenance. A series of fires further contributed to concerns about the building's condition, including incidents in 1995, 1996, and 1998, some of which were suspected to be caused by arson.

By the end of the decade, much of the complex was underutilized, with only a small number of tenants remaining. The combination of economic decline, safety concerns, and sustained vacancy led to the eventual sale of the property and its consideration for redevelopment.

== Conversion to residential use ==
In 2000, the property was acquired by a developer with plans to convert the office complex into residential units. The project was part of a broader trend of adaptive reuse in downtown Hamilton, where underutilized office buildings such as the historic Pigott Building were repurposed for residential use.

Following delays related to financing and project approvals, the building reopened in 2006 as Chateau Royale, a condominium development. The conversion included significant exterior alterations and interior renovations to accommodate residential units.

The project has been cited as part of early 21st-century efforts to revitalize downtown Hamilton through residential intensification and proximity to transit infrastructure.

== Amenities ==
The building includes a range of resident amenities and shared facilities. These include a party room with a pool table, a rooftop sun deck with panoramic views, and approximately 20,000 square feet of landscaped outdoor space atop the parking structure, as well as an outdoor barbecue patio.

Health and fitness amenities include an on-site fitness centre equipped with weights and exercise machines.

The building also features controlled access systems, video surveillance, and concierge services.

Currently, the Chateau Royale commercial space is host to a full service dental clinic.
