= James Street (Hamilton, Ontario) =

Arterial road in Hamilton, Ontario, Canada

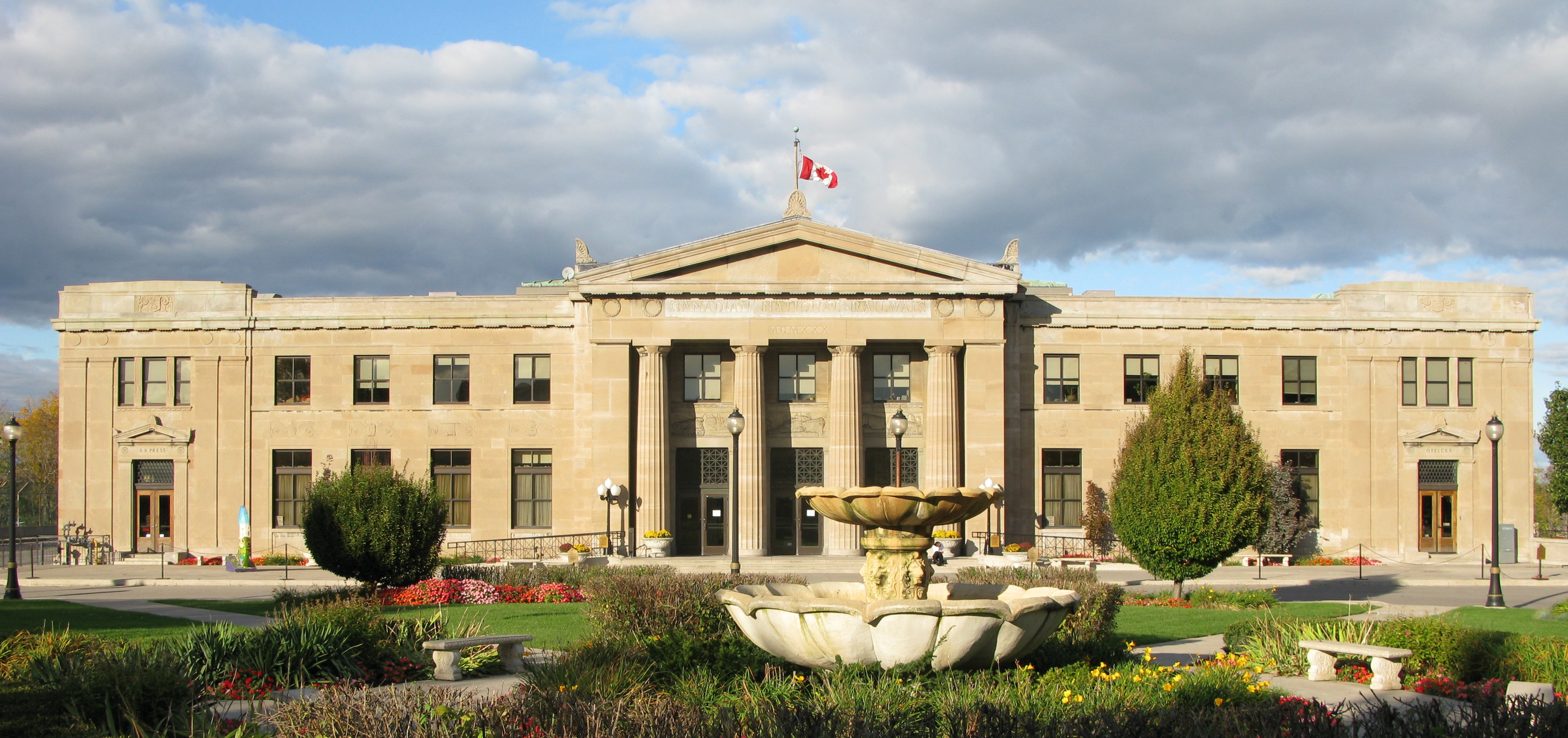
LIUNA Station (former Canadian National Railways Station), as seen from Immigration Square

James Street is a Lower City arterial road in Hamilton, Ontario, Canada. It starts off at the base of the Niagara Escarpment from James Mountain Road, a mountain-access road in the city. It was one of many arterials in the central business district converted to one-way operation in 1956 when the city retained Wilbur Smith and Associates to develop a Traffic and Transportation Plan. Parts of it were restored to two-way operation in 2002. It extends north to the city's waterfront at the North End where it ends at Guise Street West right in front of the Harbour West Marina Complex and the Royal Hamilton Yacht Club.

One can reach the Bruce Trail via James Street South. The trail cuts through the city along the Niagara Escarpment (mountain) and is used by locals and visitors alike.

== History ==
James Street was named after one of Nathaniel Hughson's sons. Hughson was one of the city founders of Hamilton along with George Hamilton and James Durand. Originally, James Street was called Lake Road because it was the road that led to Lake Ontario to the north. Then it was renamed to Jarvis Street after city founder George Hamilton's wife (Maria Jarvis) and then finally changed to its present-day James.

George Hamilton, a settler and local politician, established a town site in the northern portion of Barton Township after the war in 1815. He kept several east–west roads which were originally Indian trails, but the north–south streets were on a regular grid pattern. Streets were designated "East" or "West" if they crossed James Street or Highway 6. Streets were designated "North" or "South" if they crossed King Street or Highway 8.

James Street was the Lake Road and in 1835, James Street was extended south, but was interrupted by a bog at Hunter Street which eventually (1844) was drained out and graded.

Hugh Cossart Baker Sr. established the first life insurance company in Canada 21 August 1847; the Canada Life Assurance Company. The firm was incorporated in 1849. The first head office was in Hamilton, Ontario on the top floor of the Mechanics' Institute on James Street near Merrick, where Hamilton City Centre now stands. The head office remained in Hamilton until 1900, when the new president George Cox moved it to Toronto.

In 1872, the Bank of Hamilton was established. It had its head offices at the corner of King and James Streets and lasted until 1924. The Bank of Hamilton merged with The Commerce (later to become the Canadian Imperial Bank of Commerce, or CIBC) on January 2, 1924. It was one of the last surviving banks in Canada that was not headquartered in Toronto or Montreal.

On June 20, 1877, the first commercial telephone service in Canada began in Hamilton, Ontario. Hugh Cossart Baker Jr. learned of Alexander Graham Bell's invention in 1877 at the Philadelphia International Exposition and from there decided to test the communication tool in Hamilton. Hugh Cossart Baker Jr. is credited with making the first telephone exchange in the British Empire from an office building at the corner of James and Main Street East which still stands there today (March 2007).

In 1890, the first Bowling alley in the City opens at back of the J.W. MacDonald Tobacco shop, (66 James Street North).

In 1905, Orange Hall was built in James Street North as a meeting place for Irish Protestants. In 1969 the building became Vasco da Gama Hall, reflecting the increasing number of Portuguese immigrants to the city.

== Architecture ==
=== James Street South Architecture ===
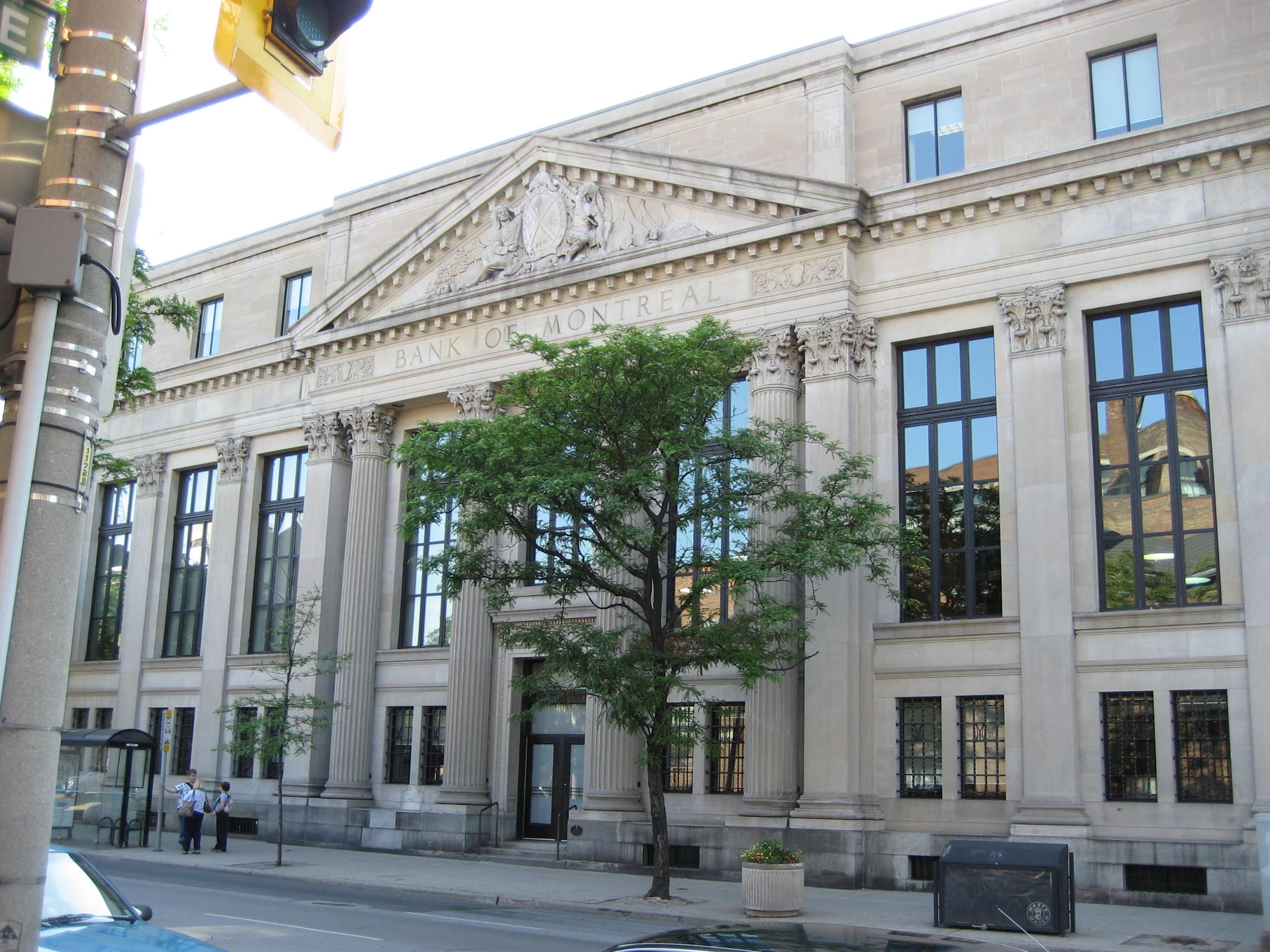
Former Bank of Montreal Building, now a branch of global law firm Gowlings WLG

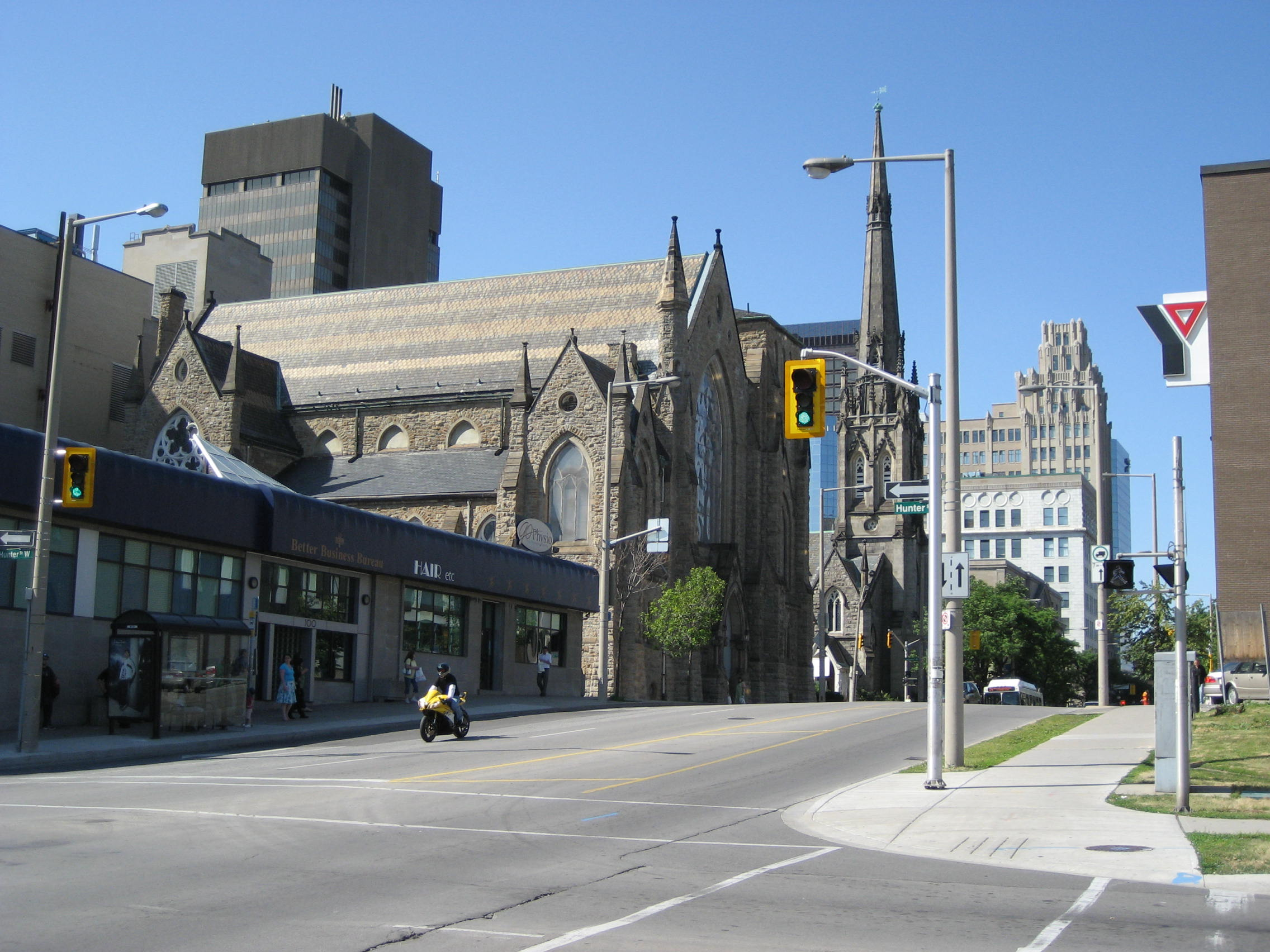
James Street Baptist Church, St. Paul's Presbyterian Church, and the Pigott Building in profile on James Street South

==== The Birks Building ====
The Birks Building (1 James St. S.), designed by architect Richard A. Waite (who also designed the Ontario Legislature building), was a striking five-storey Gothic building built in 1883 from Connecticut brown stone. Originally home to the head office of Canada Life Assurance until 1900 when the firm relocated to Toronto, its profile increased when the building was sold to jeweler Henry Birks & Sons in 1929 after being severely damaged by fire. Henry Birks & Sons restored the building, adding a copper roof and the namesake Birks Clock, an 18-foot tall, four-sided, one-tonne bronze clock with mechanical jousting knights. Once described by Oscar Wilde as "the most beautiful building in all of North America," The Birks Building was demolished in 1972, and replaced in 1974 by an office tower designed by architect Stanley Roscoe and constructed by Jackson Square developers Yale Properties.

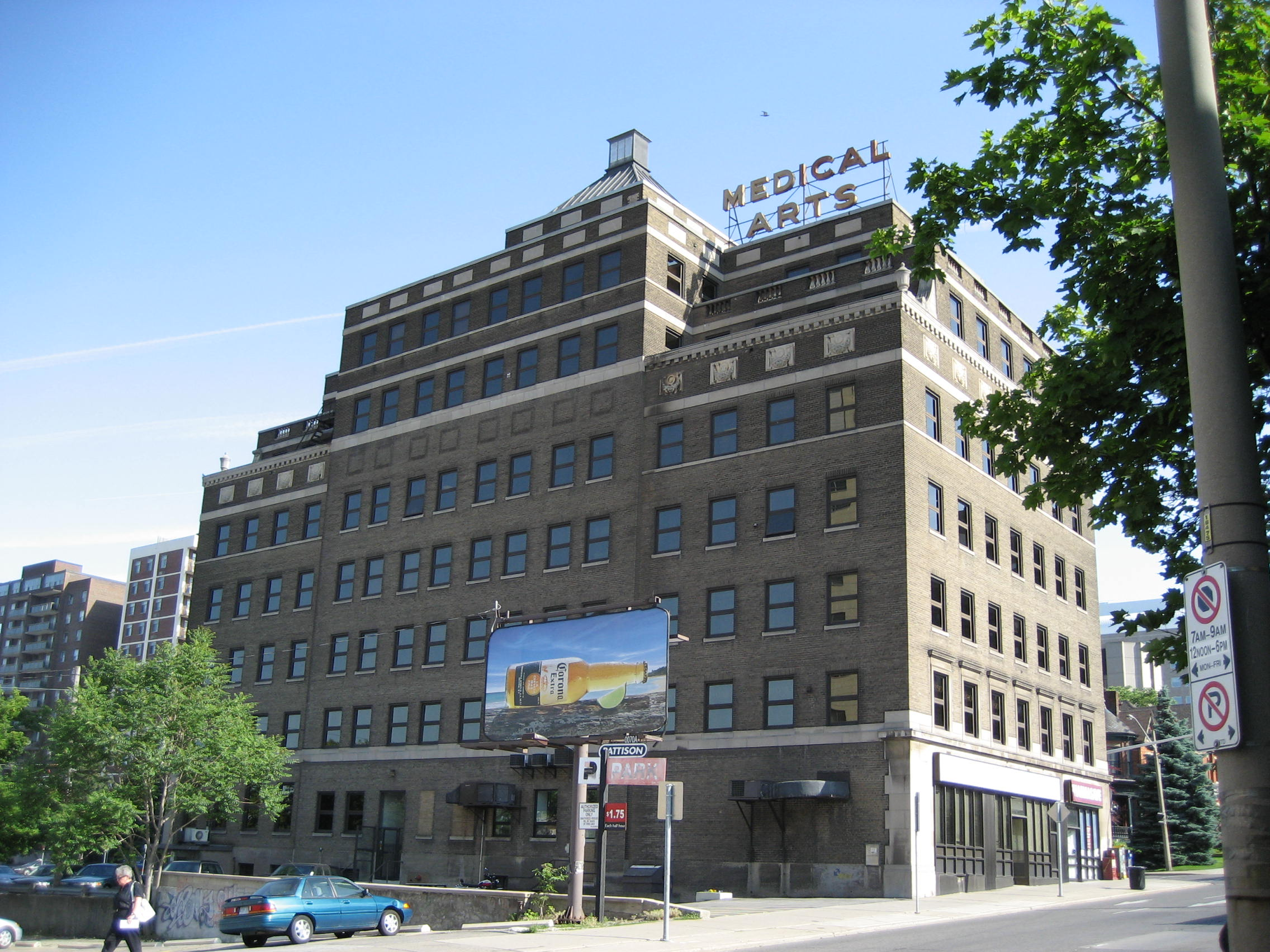
Medical Arts building, 179 James St. S.

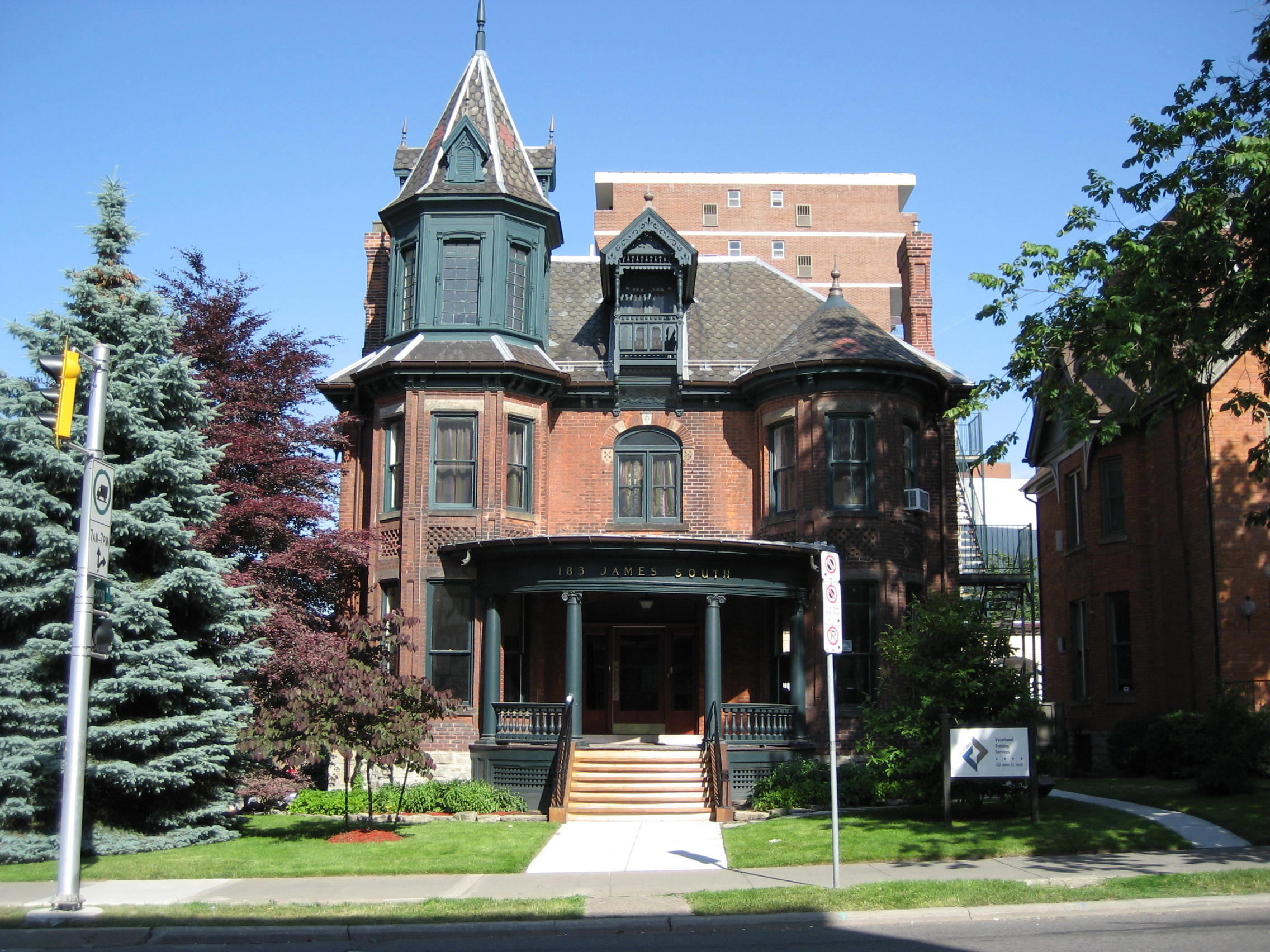
Paterson House, at 183 James St. S.

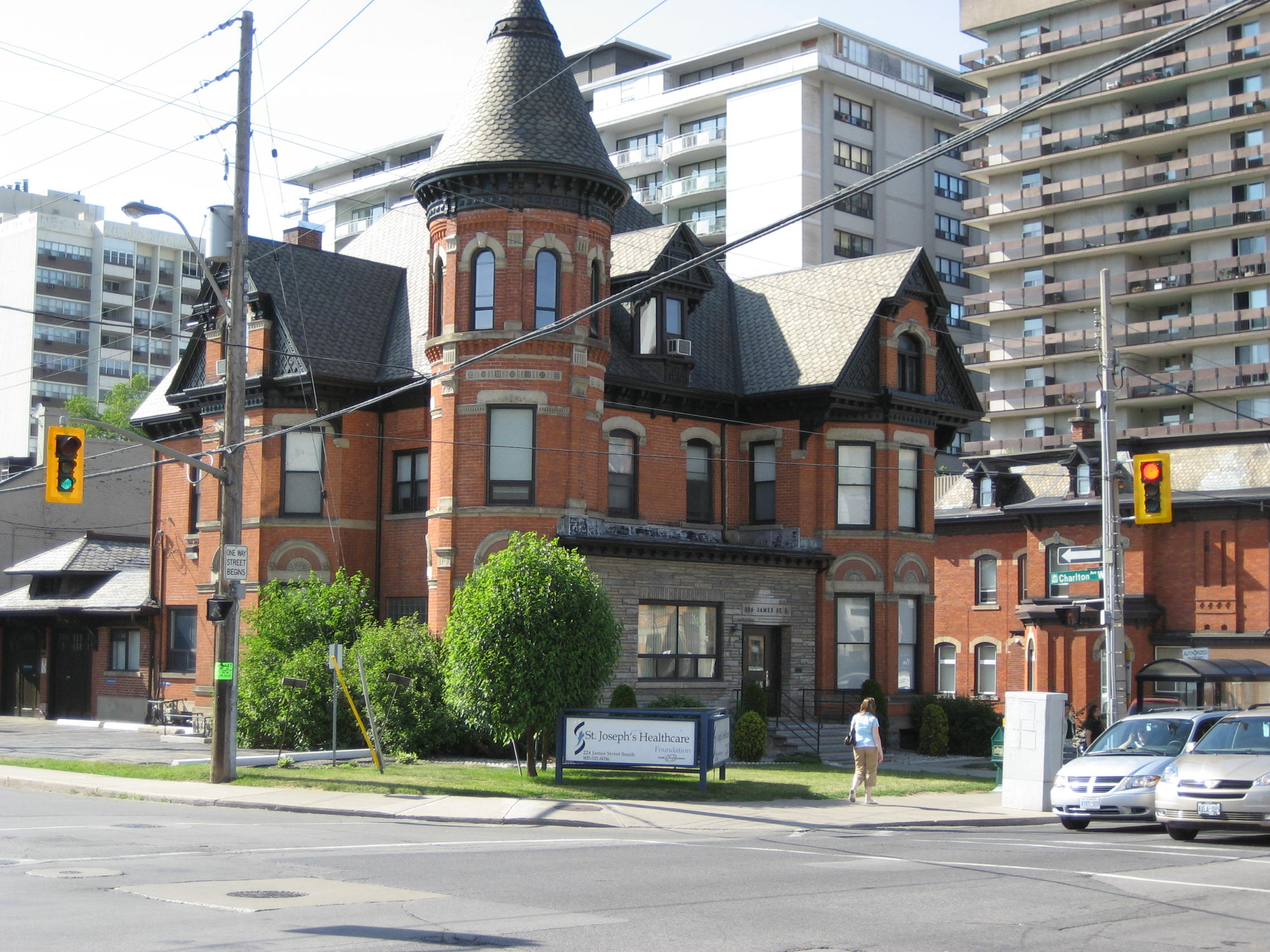
Lawry House, at 224 James St. S.

==== The Pigott Building ====
In 1928, the Pigott Building was built for $1,000,000 by the Pigott Construction Company. Known as Hamilton's first skyscraper, it has 18 floors and stands at 210 feet (64 m). The Gothic Revival style building, designed by Hamilton architects Bernard and Fred Prack, is designated under the Ontario Heritage Act. Originally an office building, the Pigott Building was converted to 110 residential condominium units in 1998.

==== The Bank of Montreal Building ====
A sturdy two-storey structure structure with a cathedral-like interior, the Bank of Montreal building (corner of James & Main Streets) was constructed by the Pigott Construction Company in 1928, to the designs of Montreal architect Kenneth G. Rea. The building had its cornerstone laid on 8 August 1928 and was completed 18 June 1929. At the time, the bank's directors were quoted in the local papers as saying, "This building is evidence of the Bank of Montreal's faith in Hamilton's future and Hamilton's growing importance as one of the leading commercial and industrial centres in Canada." In 1972, the Bank of Montreal vacated the building when they moved to the then-new Bank of Montreal Pavilion (now known as 1 James Street North), but the following year the Hamilton Public Library used it as a reference library. In September 1980, the building was vacated again and was used occasionally in the 1990s as a nightclub (Monopoli, Puzzle, The Syndicate). It was later renovated and today it is home to the Hamilton offices of law firm Gowlings WLG.

==== Balfour House ====
The three-storey detached Victorian at 250 James Street South was built in 1880 and designed by local architect James Balfour (who was most notably responsible for the design of Hamilton’s 1889 City Hall). Formally designated under the Ontario Heritage Act, the home is one of Hamilton’s finest examples of Second Empire architecture.

==== Griffith Palatial Home ====
A late Victorian mansion constructed in 1891 as the home of business magnate Tunis B. Griffith and designed by noted local architect W. A. Edwards, 252 James Street South is an outstanding example of the Richardsonian Romanesque style of architecture. For nearly half a century, the building was home to notable Hamiltonians — first Griffith, then businessman and politician Sir John S. Hendrie (who owned the home during his term as Lieutenant-Governor of Ontario), who willed the home to his son Major William Ian S. Hendrie (president of the Hamilton Bridge Works Company). In 1937, the building was sold to Sam Henson and converted into apartments, later accommodating various personal care businesses on its main level.

=== James Street North Architecture ===
==== The Lister Block ====
The Lister Block building, on the corner of James and King William Street, was the first indoor commercial mall in Canada. First built in 1886, it is named for Joseph Lister, the original owner, who was a merchant, clothier, member of the city's Board of Water Commissioners and school trustee. His goal was to build a "most modern and central accommodation" for small merchants at modest rent. The Lister Block was destroyed by fire in 1923 and the second building was erected in 1924. This classic Renaissance building is 32,000 square feet (3,000 m^{2}) with six floors and sits on the corner of James and King William Street. The original building built in 1886 only had four floors. It was the first indoor commercial mall in Canada. One of the few buildings of its type in Ontario west of Toronto, its style is more frequently seen in American Great Lakes cities. In 2004, the then-abandoned Lister Block was used as a filming site for a music video for the song Home by Canadian rock band Three Days Grace. The then-derelict building was also a significant shooting location for 2006 film Silent Hill, in which it served as the Grand Hotel.

==== Old City Hall ====
Constructed on the footprint of predecessor Market Hall (1839-1887), Old City Hall was designed by architect James Balfour, and its cornerstone laid on July 19, 1888. Municipal staff moved into the building six months later. Within four years, the building was fitted with electric lights; within 30, the Hamilton Spectator was suggesting that a new City Hall was sorely needed. Old City Hall closed officially on October 28, 1960, with its ownership transferred to Eatons. Demolition began in January 1961 and concluded when the cornerstone was hauled away in June of that year (its contents were incorporated in the cornerstone of the new City Hall). The clock and bell from Old City Hall's 38-metre clock tower went into the tower of the 1990 Eaton Centre (later rebranded as Hamilton City Centre). Most rubble from Old City Hall was used as fill for the Pier 8 extension at the base of Catherine Street North.

==== The Federal Building ====
The Federal Building on James Street North was built in 1856. It was first home to a post office which eventually moved to the corner of King and John Streets. It was then the temporary site of the Hamilton City Hall between 1888 and 1890 while the new structure on the corner of James and Market Streets was being built. In 1897, the Sun-Life Assurance Company totally renovated it for their own district offices. In 1920, it went through another major renovation which saw the addition of two more storeys. Currently, the building serves as residential apartments.

==== LIUNA Station ====
In 2000, LIUNA Station reopened the James Street North Canadian National rail station as a banquet hall. In 1996 the station was used for the most expensive film ever made in Canada to that time, The Long Kiss Goodnight, which cost $95 million USD to make. In 2000, X-Men shot some of its scenes at LIUNA Station.

== James Street North ==
=== James North Art Crawl ===
Growth in the arts and culture sector garnered media attention for Hamilton at the dawn of the 21st century. A 2006 article in The Globe and Mail, "Go West, Young Artist," focused on the city's growing art scene. On the second Friday of every month (except September), the neighbourhood hosts the James North Art Crawl, where visitors can experience art galleries, shop in independent businesses, and visit neighbourhood cafes and restaurants. Founded in September 2005 as an evening of synchronized art exhibition openings, the James North Art Crawl was, at its peak, a self-directed walking tour of more than 20 art galleries on the street. In 2007, the James North Art Crawl was awarded an Award of Merit as a Visionary Project by the City of Hamilton Urban Design and Architecture Awards.

Despite those origins, the James North Art Crawl has long been synonymous with anarchic sidewalk vendors, leading to escalating tensions and declining quality over the last decade, with some saying that it "feels more like a big garage sale” “oversaturated with random vintage clothes.”

At the same time, most galleries have closed and artists have largely been priced out of the neighbourhood. More than 50 art galleries and artist studios along James Street North have closed since the fall of 2005. Very few now exist on the street. Only three galleries from the Art Crawl's 2005 launch are still in operation 20 years later: Hamilton Artists Inc., Centre[3] (originally The Print Studio, rebranded in 2012), and You Me Gallery.

This “bleached reef” effect was predicted by gentrification critics at least as early as 2010, when Mayday Magazine’s article “To The Footsoldiers of Gentrification” was met with reflexive objections from the city’s creative class. In late 2011, Hamilton's arts and culture department, formerly operated under the umbrella of community services, was folded into the City's economic development division. A widely circulated 2015 broadside, “Now That It’s Undeniable,” updated the "Footsoldiers" critique. By 2018, there was remorseful acknowledgement that arts workers had facilitated dynamics that would, in a bitter irony, make the neighbourhood increasingly inhospitable to creative spaces and working artists.

=== Time Capsule ===
A time capsule was buried beneath a marker on the north-east corner of James & Wilson Streets on November 16, 1988 by the Jamesville Business Community under the aegis of the city's Business Improvement Area (BIA) programme. It commemorates the completion of the James Street North streetscape project (1986–1988).

== Transit ==
Two GO Transit stations are located on James Street: Hamilton GO Centre at James South and Hunter and West Harbour GO on James North.

Trains once blocked north-south traffic on James Street, an inconvenience that ended when the James Street underpass was completed in December 1931.

=== Waterfront Shuttle ===
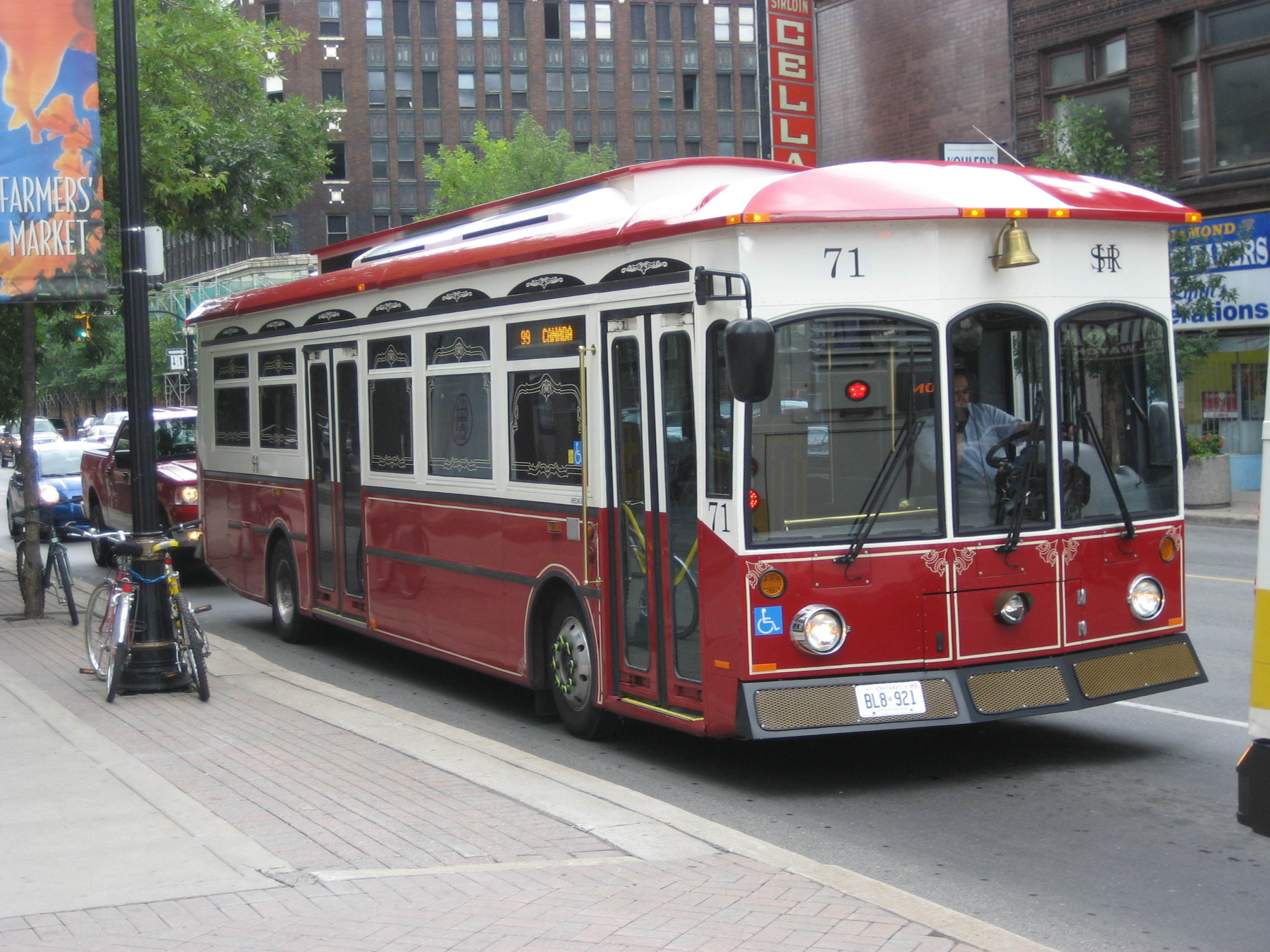
Route 99 - Waterfront Shuttle (seasonal)

The Waterfront Shuttle is a free service offered by the Hamilton Street Railway. It has a seasonal schedule that runs weekends from May-to-October connecting Hamilton's downtown core to the waterfront and attractions that can be found there like HMCS Haida and the Parks Canada Discovery Centre. The route circles Hamilton's downtown core around York Boulevard (north), Bay Street South (west), King Street West (south) and James Street North (east). Then it travels north along James Street and the Art District until it reaches the waterfront at Guise Street past the Royal Hamilton Yacht Club and the Harbour West Marina Complex.

=== Waterfront Trolley ===
The Hamilton Waterfront Trolley is a narrated tour along the 12 kilometre Hamilton Waterfront Trail. The main stop and departure spot is at the Hamilton Waterfront SCOOPS Ice Cream parlour. There are a dozen stops along the way between Princess Point at the western-end of the route to the eastern-end, the site of HMCS Haida (also nearby is the site of the Hamiltonian Tour Boat, a 12-passenger tour boat that offers leisurely guided tours of Hamilton's west harbour).

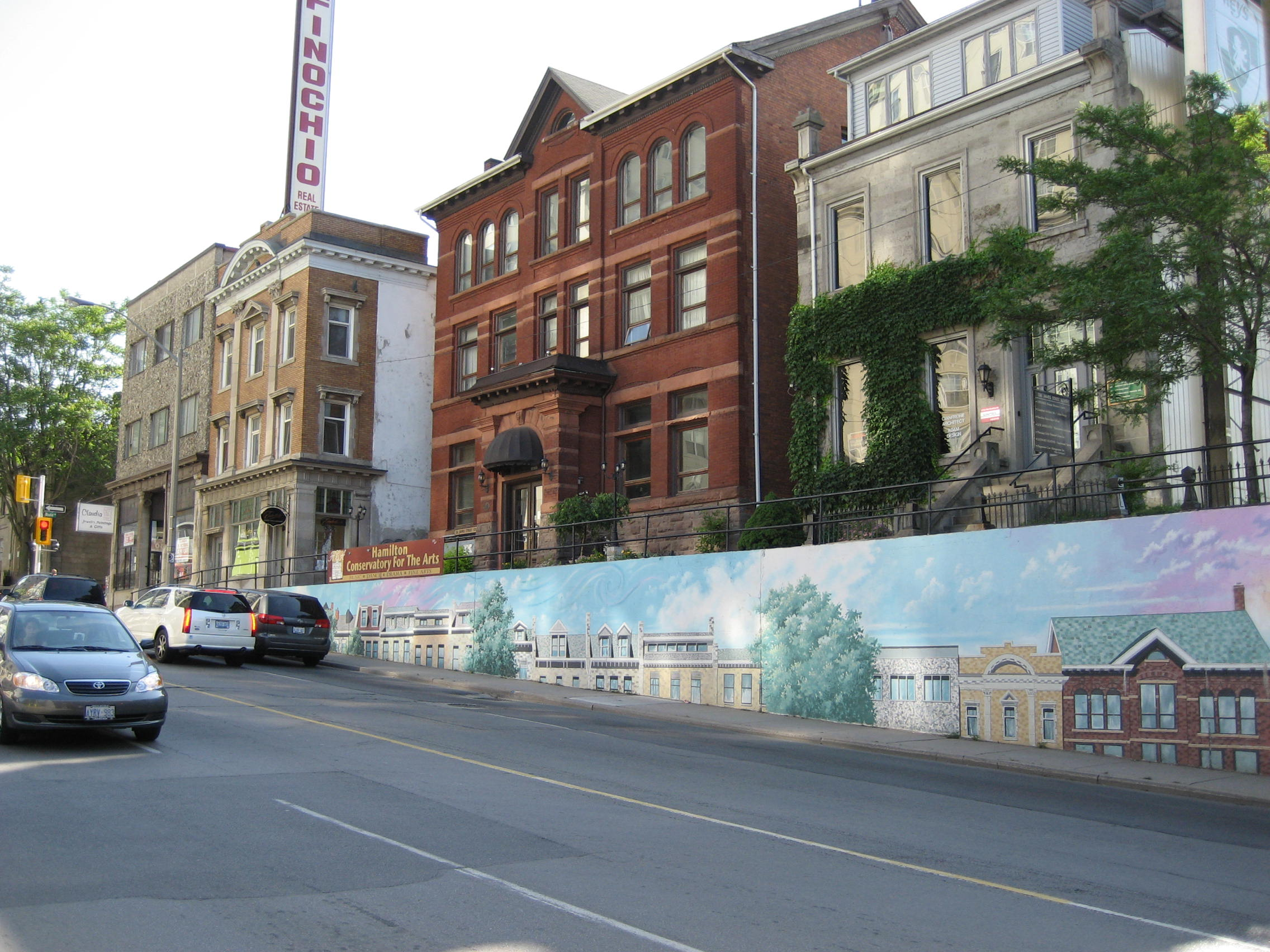
South of the T. H. & B. Railway Bridge

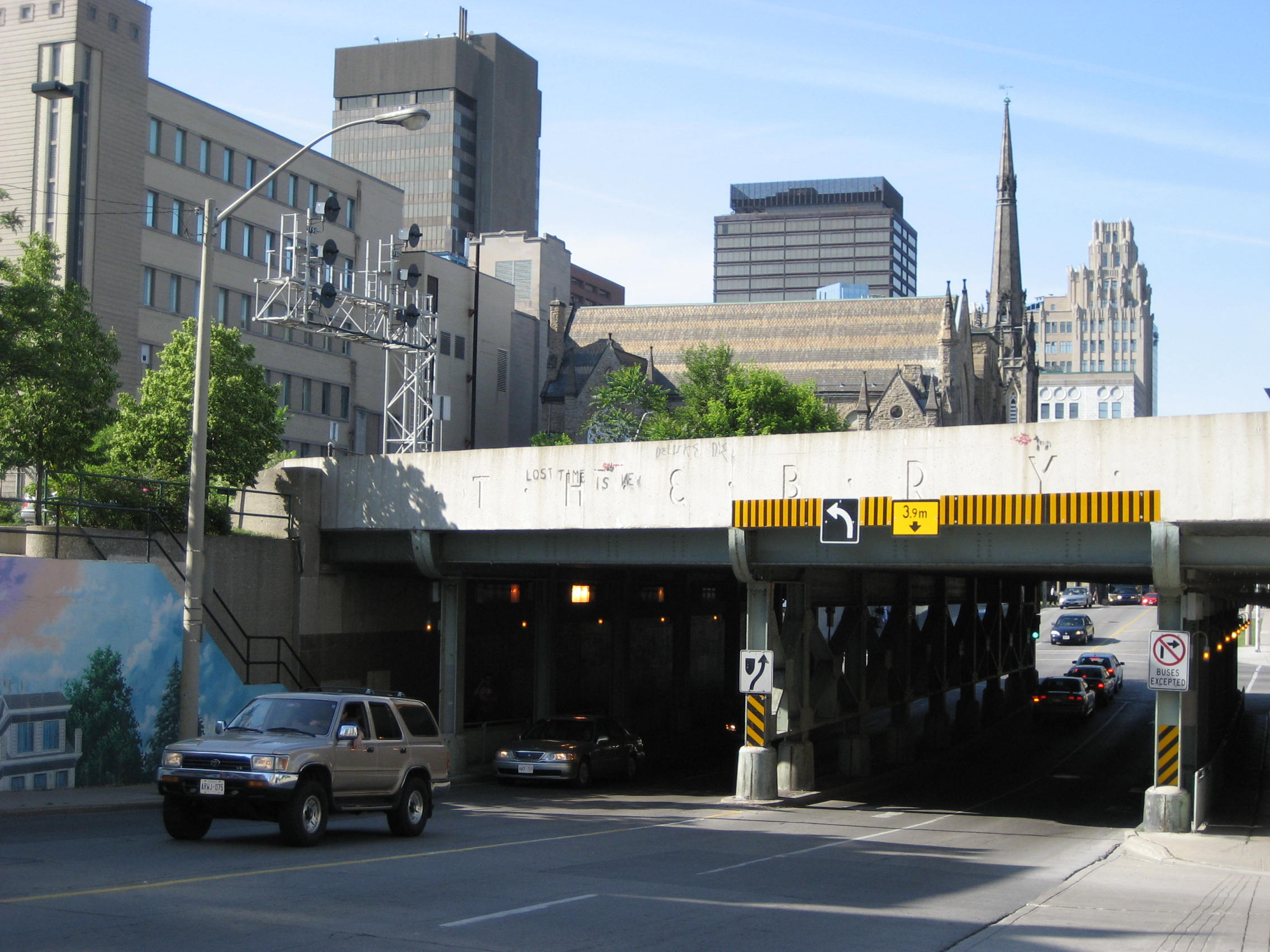
T.H.& B. Railway Bridge, James Street South

=== West End Incline Railway ===
James Street, at the base of the Niagara Escarpment (mountain) was the site of the city's first Incline railway (1892–1932). Back then, the Incline railway on James Street was known as the Hamilton & Barton Incline Railway. It connected to present day Upper James Street. The city's second Incline railway on Wentworth Street South, (1895–1936), was known as the Eastend Incline Railway but was often called, The Mount Hamilton Incline Railway. The Eastend Incline on Wentworth Street was electrically operated and the Westend Incline on James Street depended on steam for its power. The west end lincline closed in 1932 and tracks removed and all that remains is a trail of the old railway.

In 1924, following the city's booming development in the east, there was some serious discussion regarding the addition of a third incline railway. The 2 locations be considered at the time were Sherman Avenue or Ottawa Street South. The population of Hamilton Mountain at the time was 6,000.

In 1929, the city's brochures were using the motto, "The City Beautiful and Hub of Canadian Highways" as well as "The City of Opportunity". In regards to the Incline railways, the brochures go on to boast, "There is no finer view anywhere on the North American continent than the panorama to be seen from the Hamilton mountain. The city below, the blue waters of Hamilton harbour and Lake Ontario. In the background, flanked on the east by the famous Niagara Fruit District and on the west by the beautiful Dundas Valley and a range of hills, combine to make a picture no artist could paint. There are several roads leading up to the summit and you can drive upon "high", but if you want to enjoy a unique experience and give the family a thrill, drive your car onto one of the Incline Railways and you will have something to tell the folks about when you go back home."

== Images ==
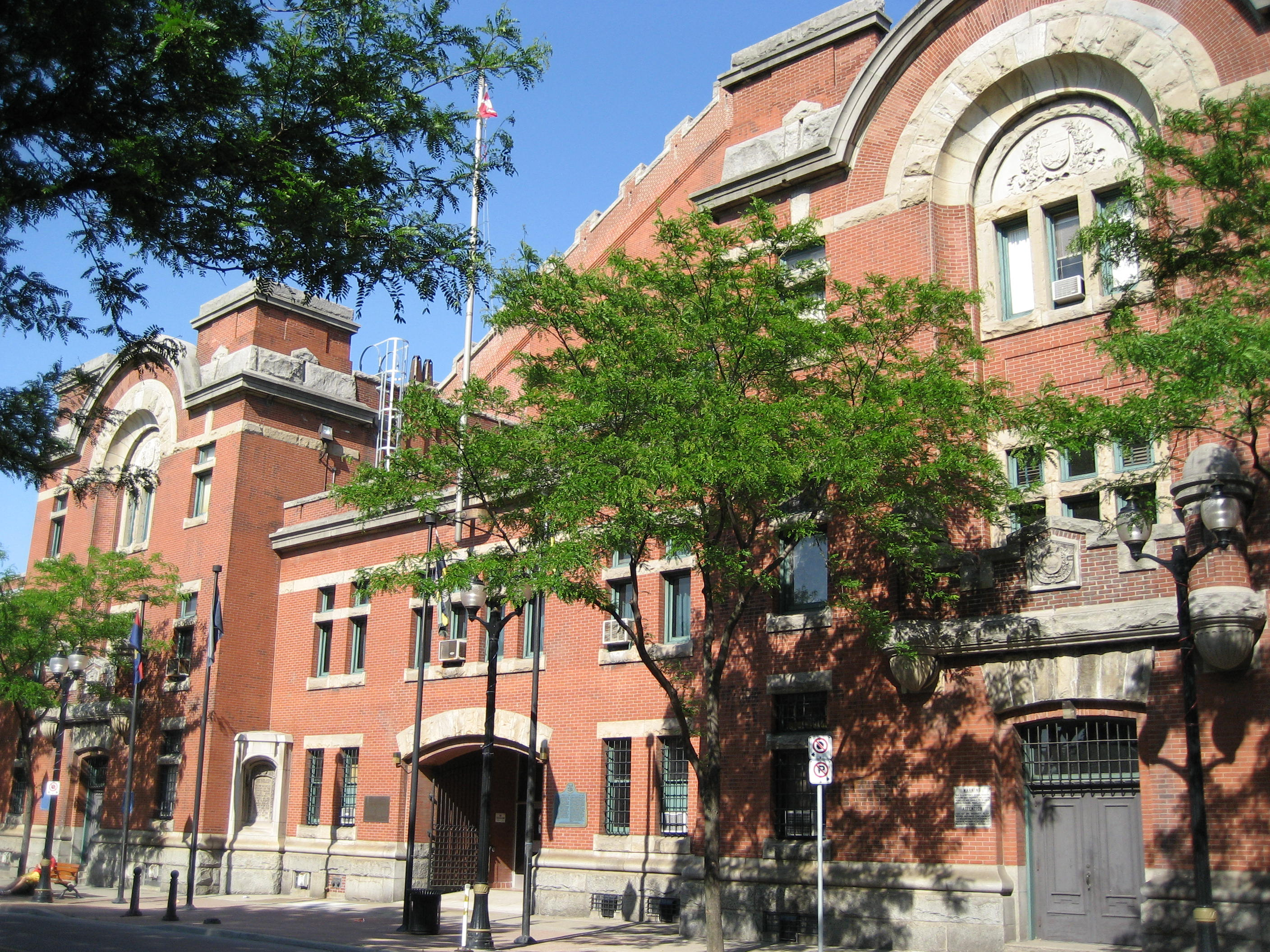
John Weir Foote V.C. Armouries is a Classified Federal Heritage Building 1986 on the Register of the Government of Canada Heritage Buildings.

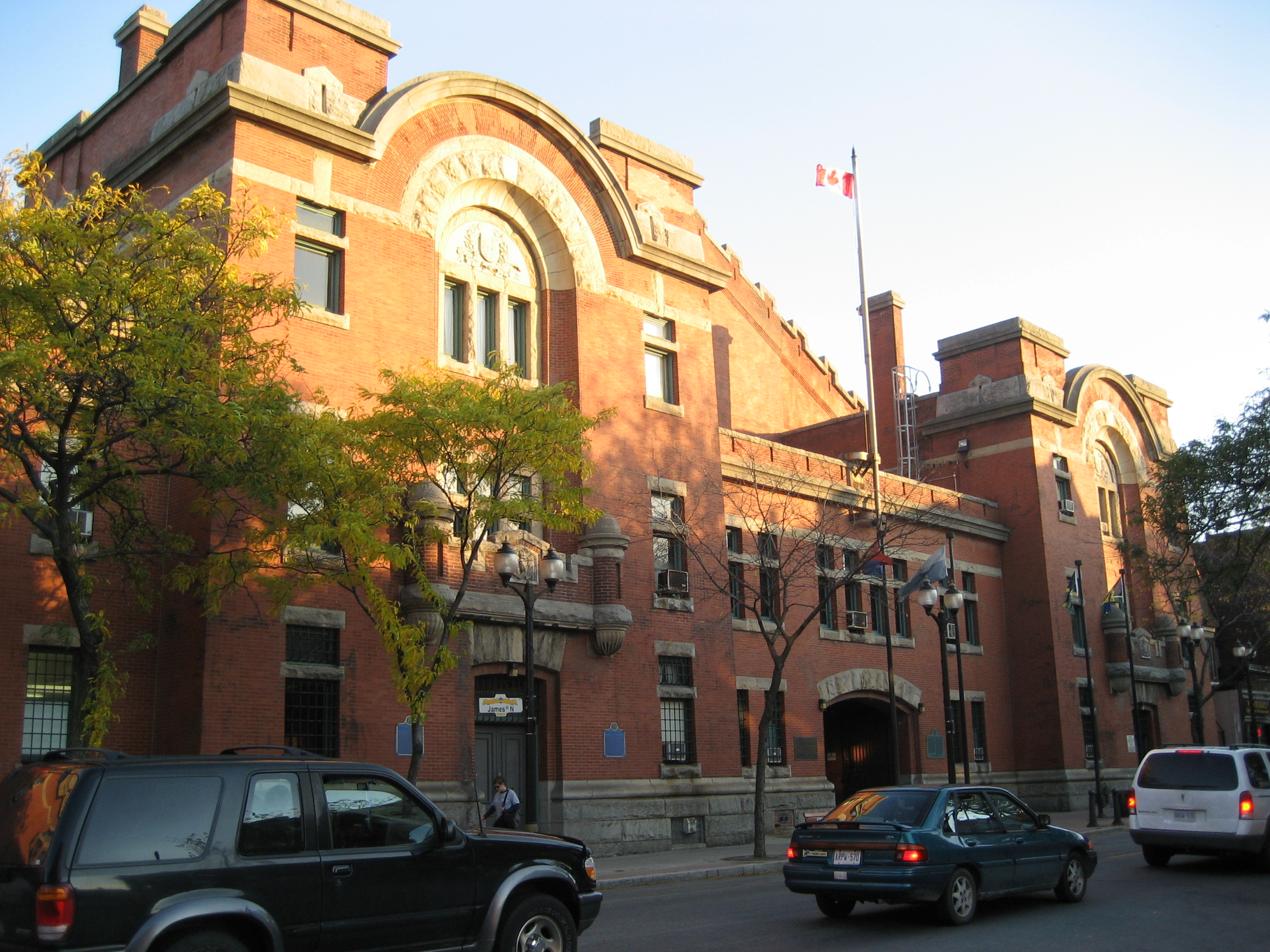
John Weir Foote V.C. Armouries

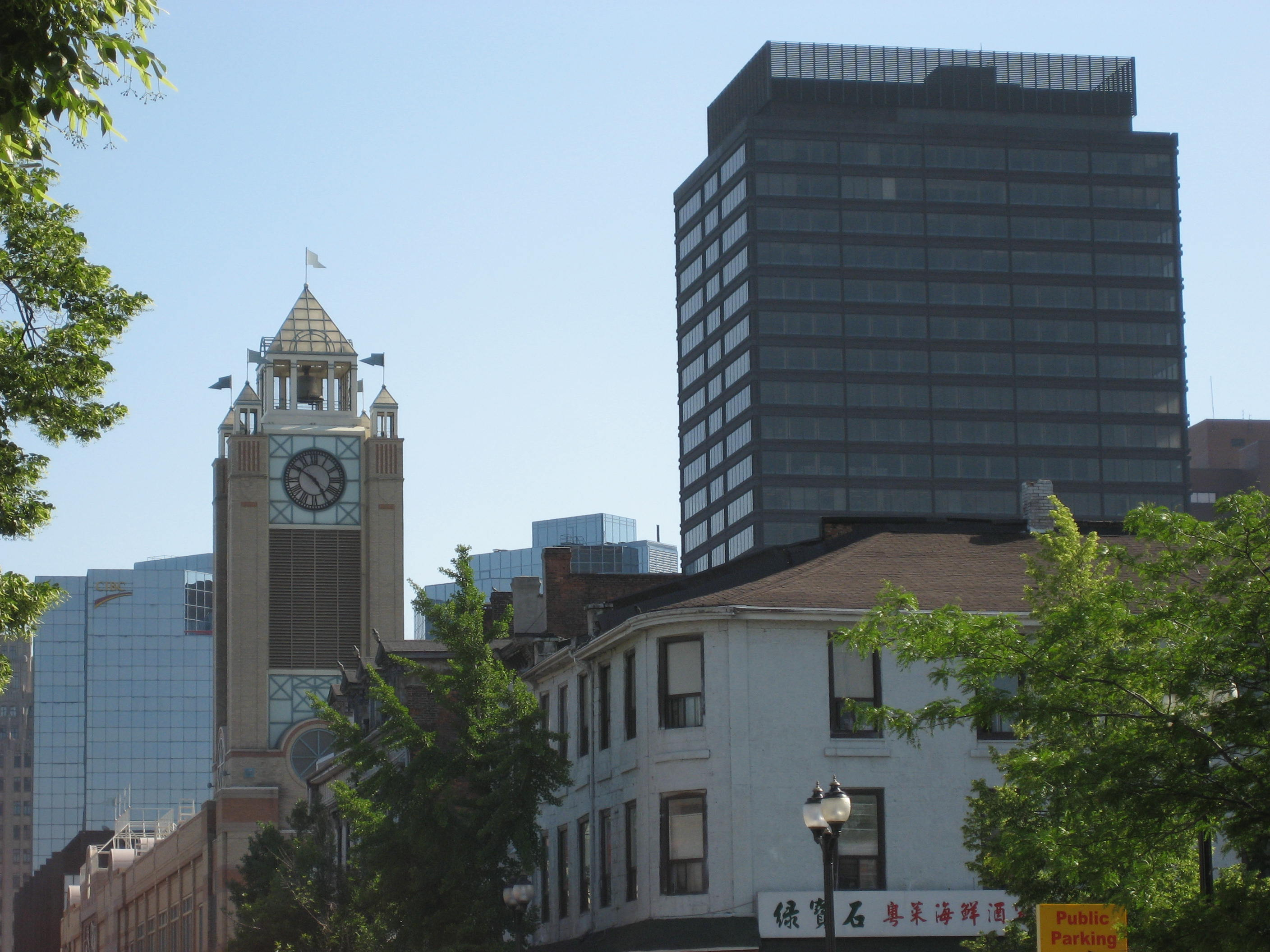
Hamilton City Centre clock tower & Stelco Tower

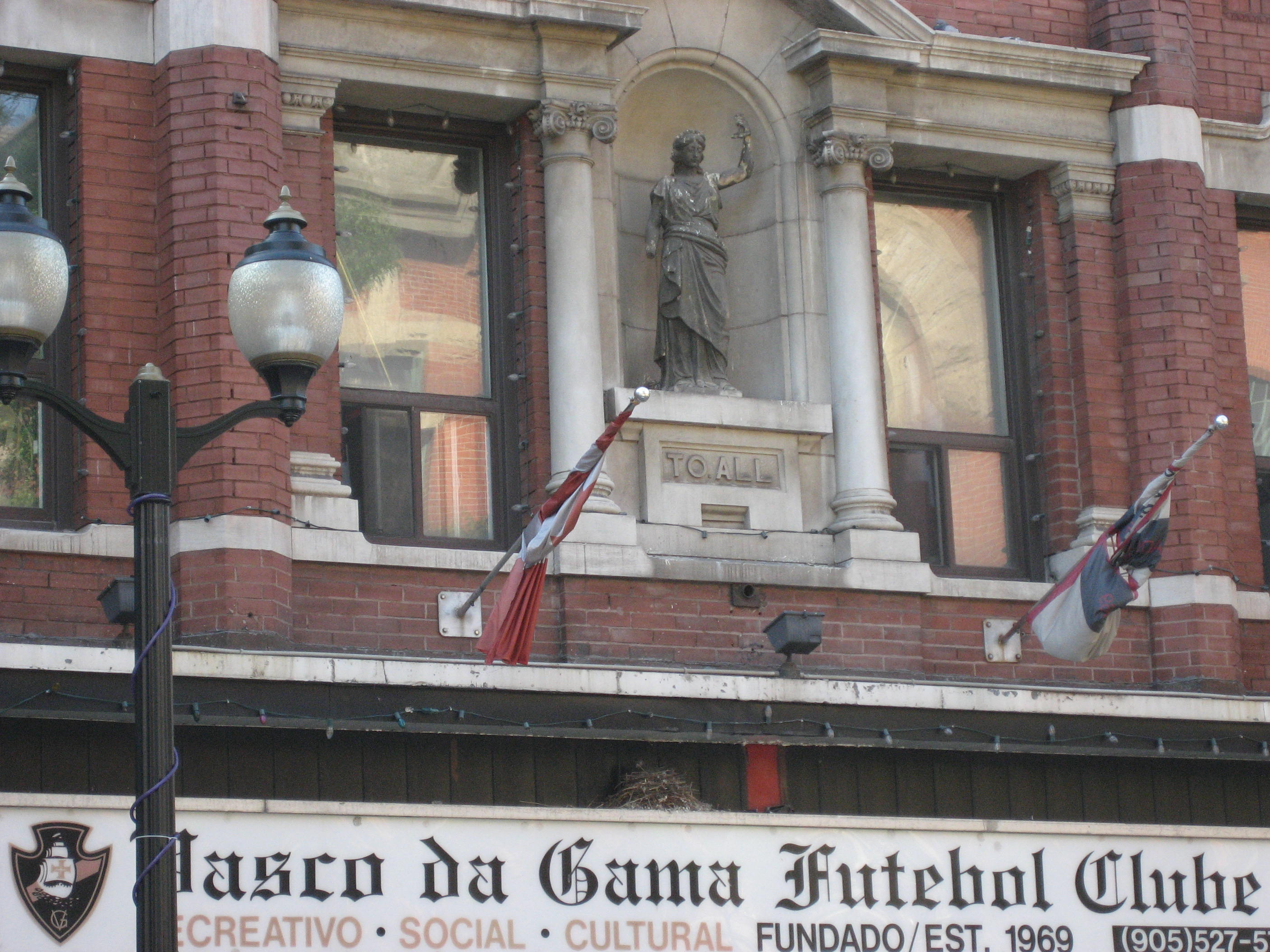
Former Orange Hall on James Street

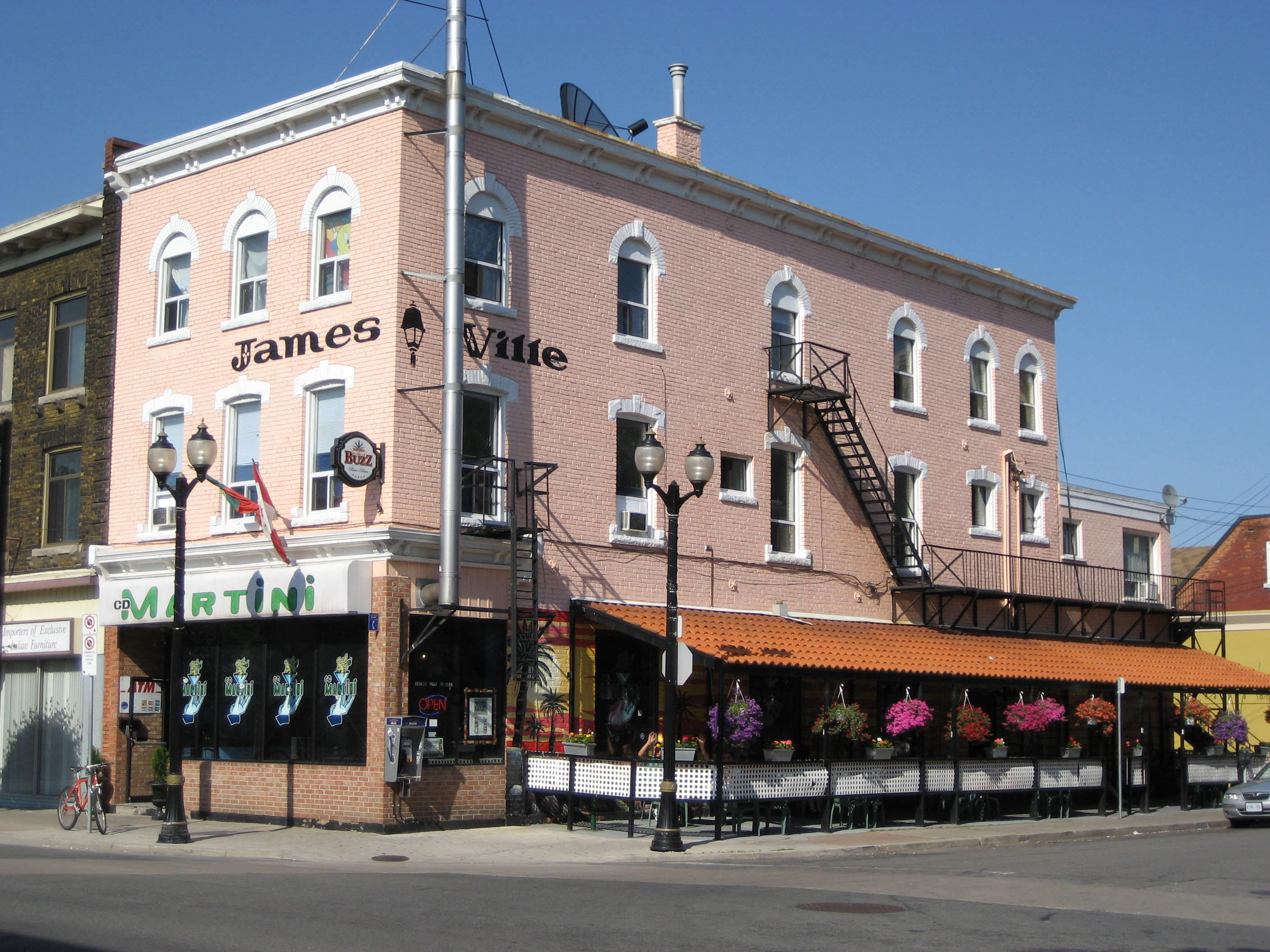
A typical James Street North European-style restaurant/ cafe

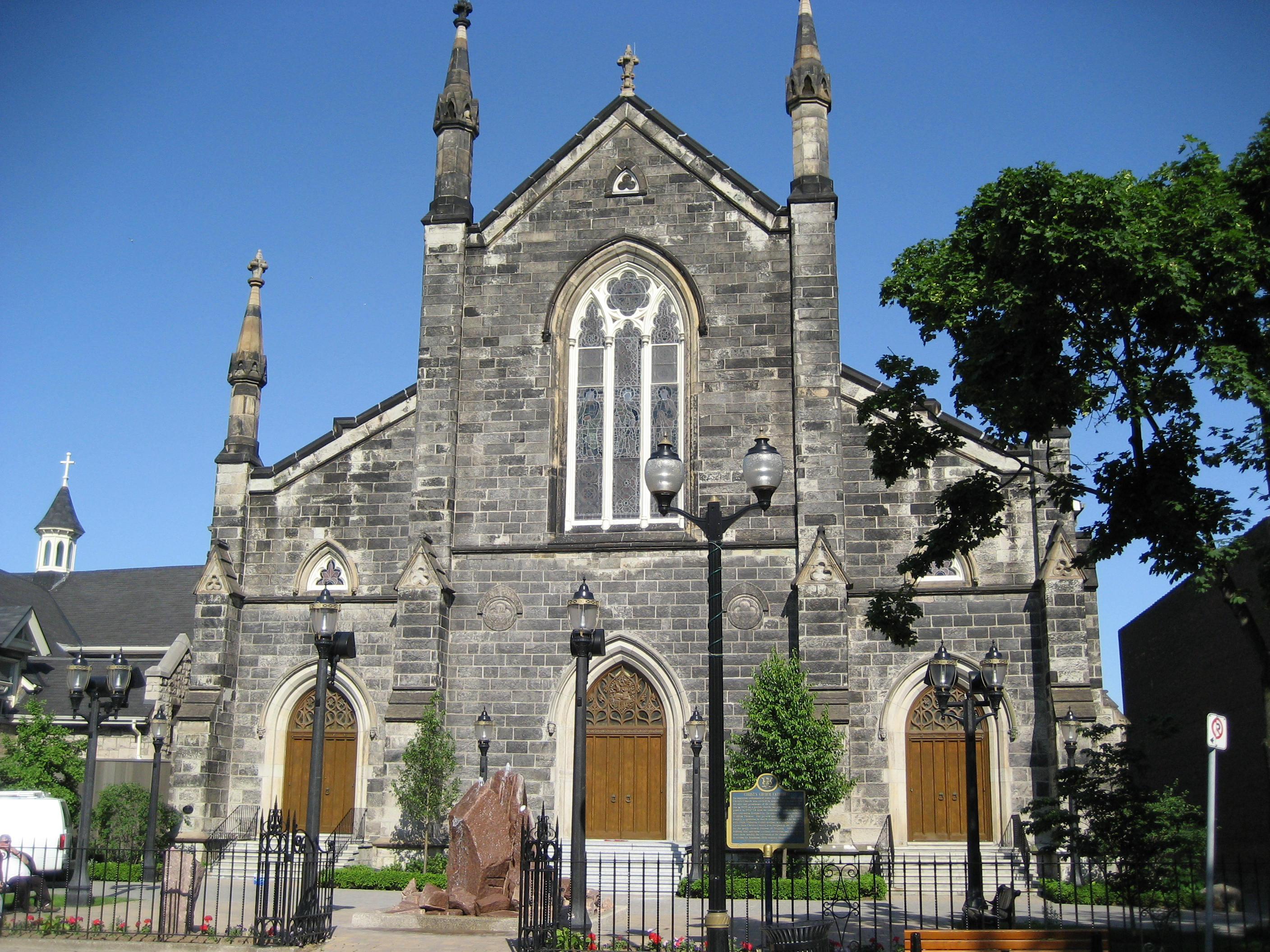
Christ's Church Cathedral, Anglican Diocese of Niagara, Hamilton, Ontario, Canada

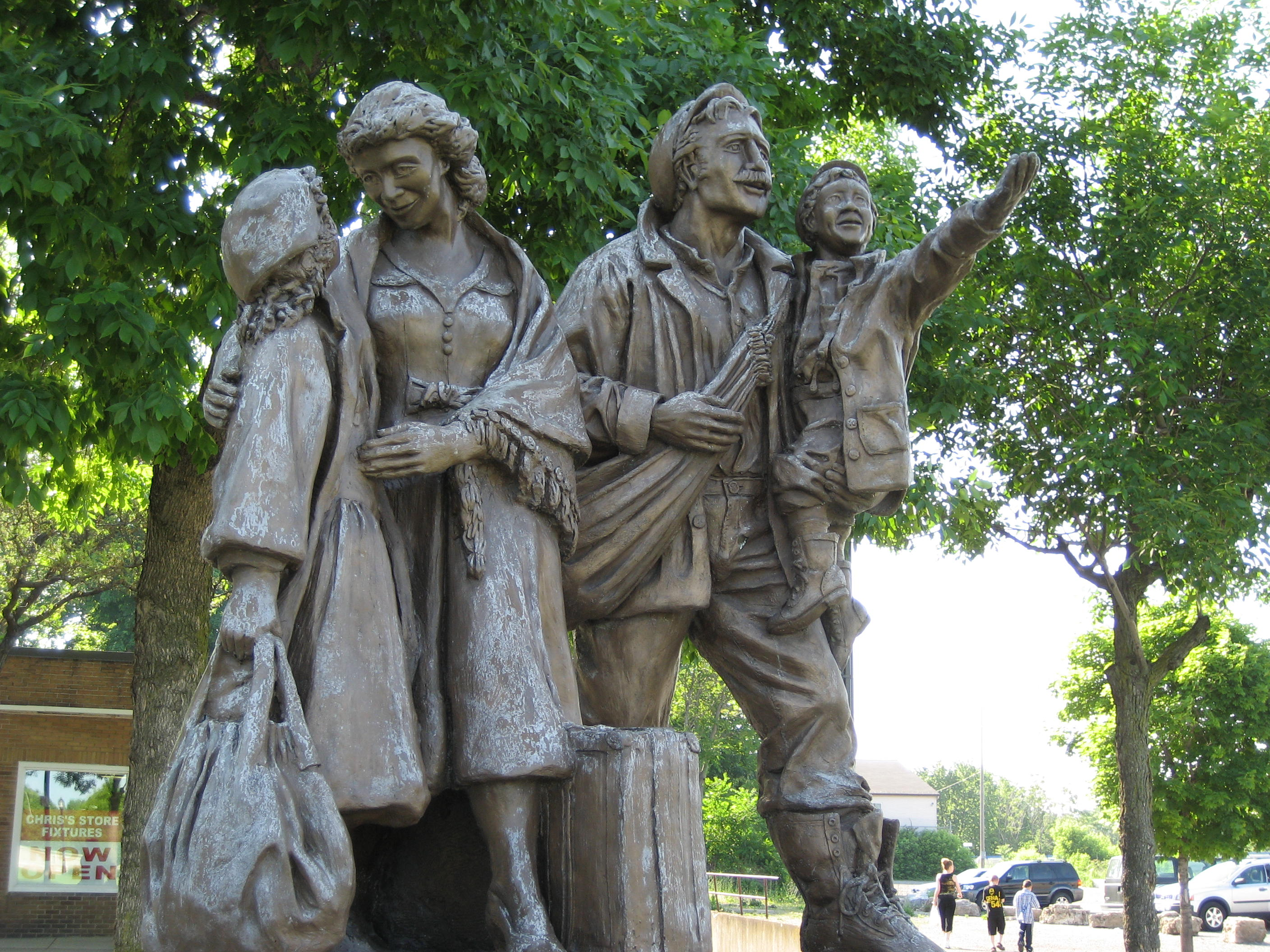
Courage, Hopes & Dreams statue @ Immigration Square, LIUNA Station

== See also ==
- Chateau Royale (Hamilton, Ontario)
- Niagara Escarpment Commission
