= Pigott Building =

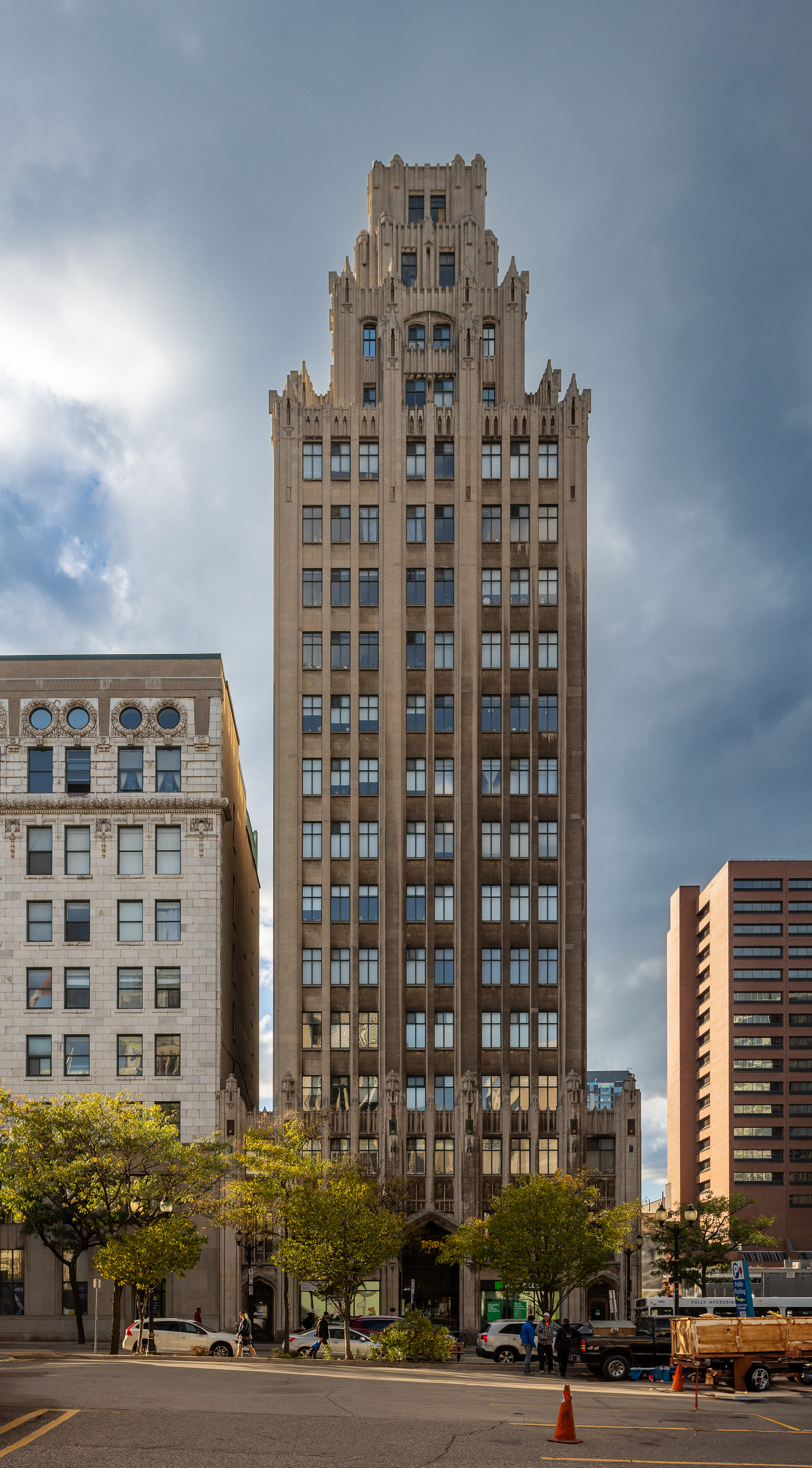

General information
- Type: Residential/ Condo
- Location: Hamilton, Ontario, Canada
- Coordinates: 43.2558°N 79.8699°W
- Completed: 1929

Height
- Roof: 64 m (210 ft)

Technical details
- Floor count: 18
- Lifts/elevators: 2

Design and construction
- Architects: Prack & Prack
- Main contractor: Pigott Construction Company
Designations
Ontario Heritage Act

The Pigott Building is an 18-storey (210 feet or 64 metres) condominium building located at 36 James Street South in downtown Hamilton, Ontario, Canada. This Art Deco/Gothic Revival style building was designed by Hamilton architects Bernard and Fred Prack and is designated under the Ontario Heritage Act.

Built for CA$1,000,000 (equivalent to $18,043,956 in 2025), the Pigott Building was opened in 1929 and was originally an office building that was Hamilton's first skyscraper. Named after the construction company that built it, the Pigott Construction Company, many of Hamilton's landmarks were built by the company. Some of these include the Canadian Westinghouse offices, the Bank of Montreal Building (1928) on James Street North, McMaster University (1930), Westdale Secondary School (1931), Cathedral of Christ the King (1933), the Burlington Bay James N. Allan Skyway bridge (1958), Hamilton City Hall (1960) and Copps Coliseum (1985) on York & Bay Streets.

Pigott also built some of Canada's largest industrial plants and buildings: the Royal Ontario Museum, Toronto; Skylon Tower at Niagara Falls, Crown Life Insurance Company head office, Toronto; Bank of Canada, Ottawa; a plant for General Motors, Oshawa, and buildings for A. V. Roe Company in Malton.

It was at this location that the Canadian Club Movement had its beginning on December 6, 1892.

== Images ==
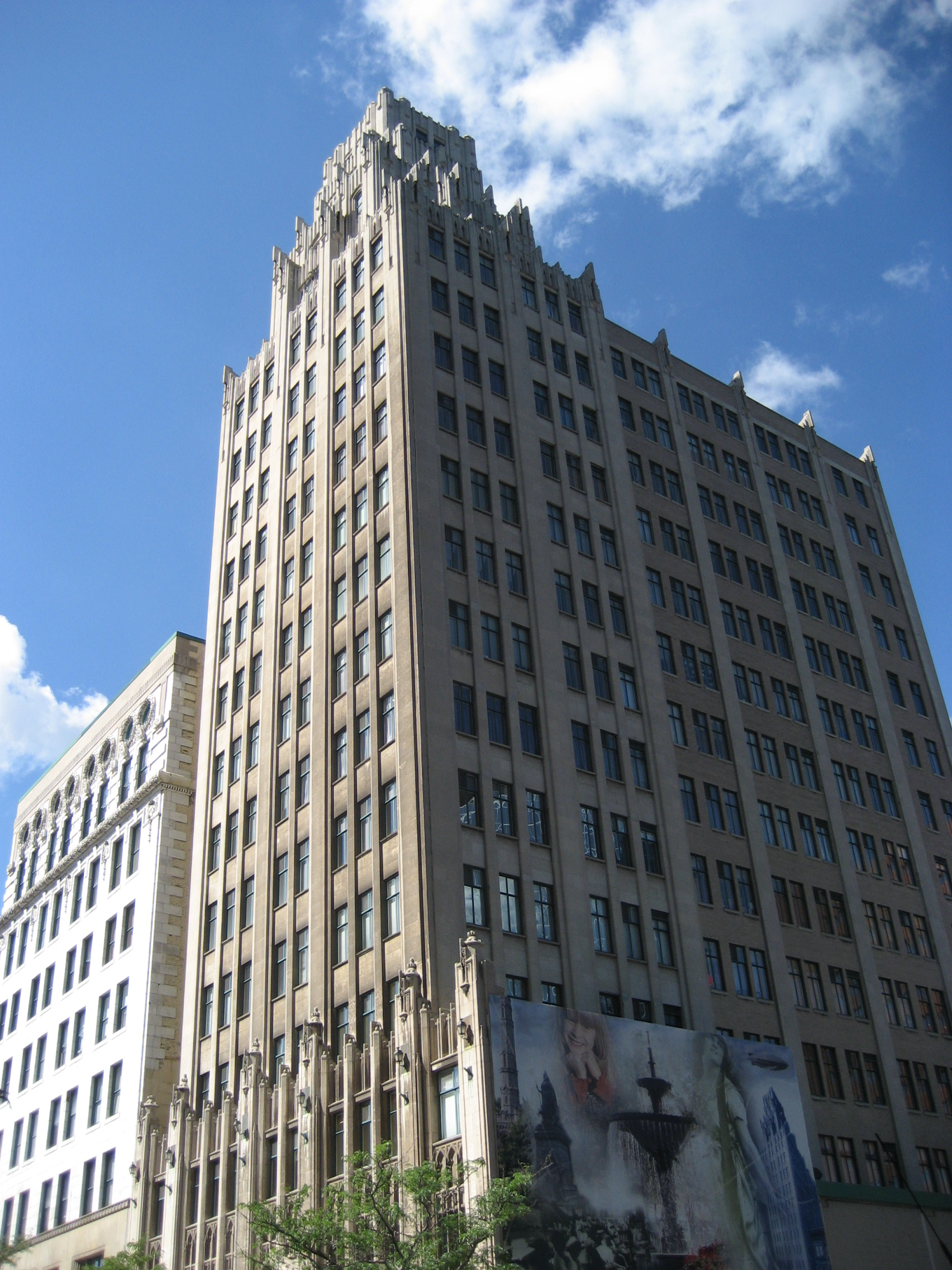
Pigott Building

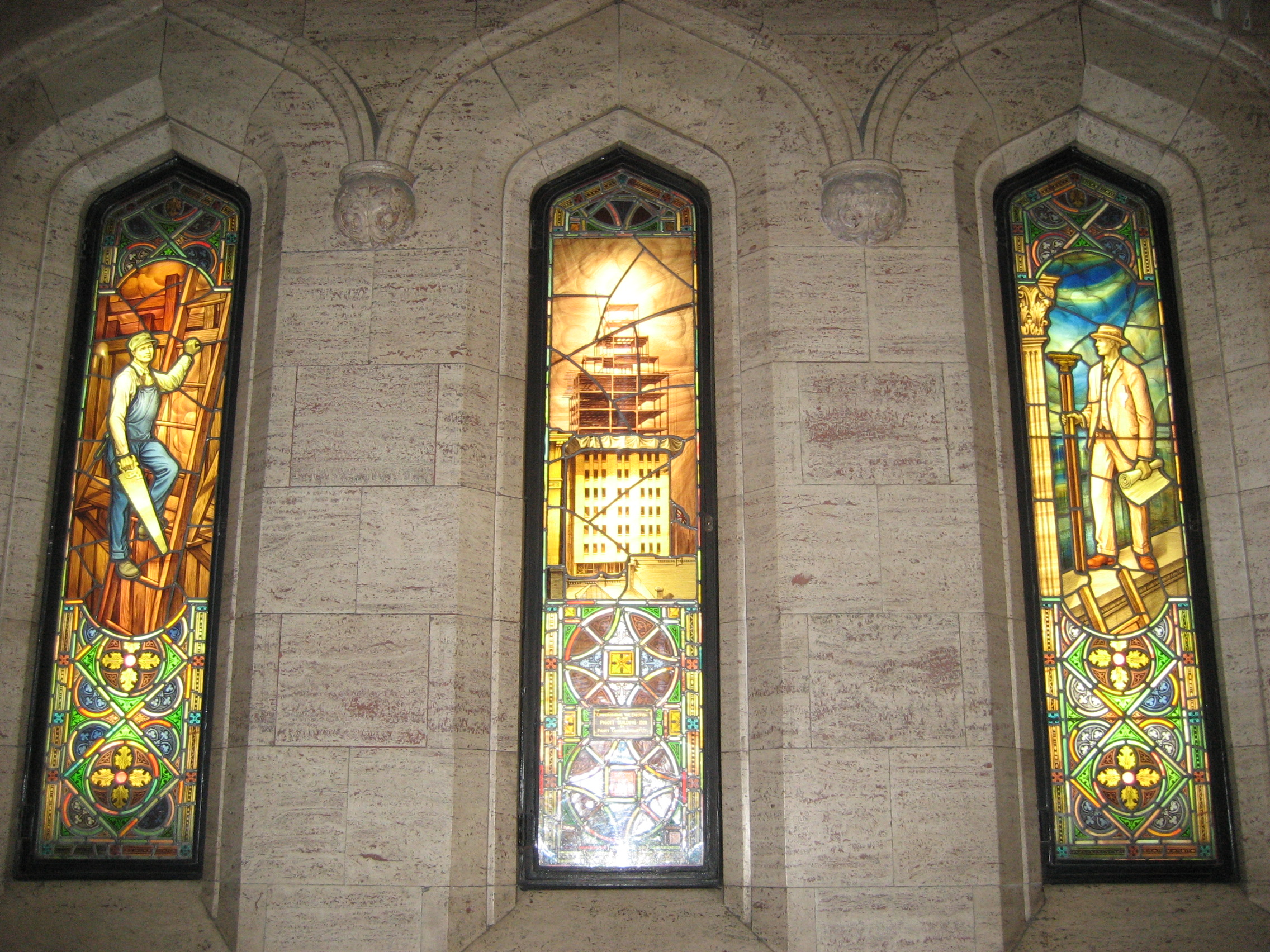
Lobby area, stained glass windows

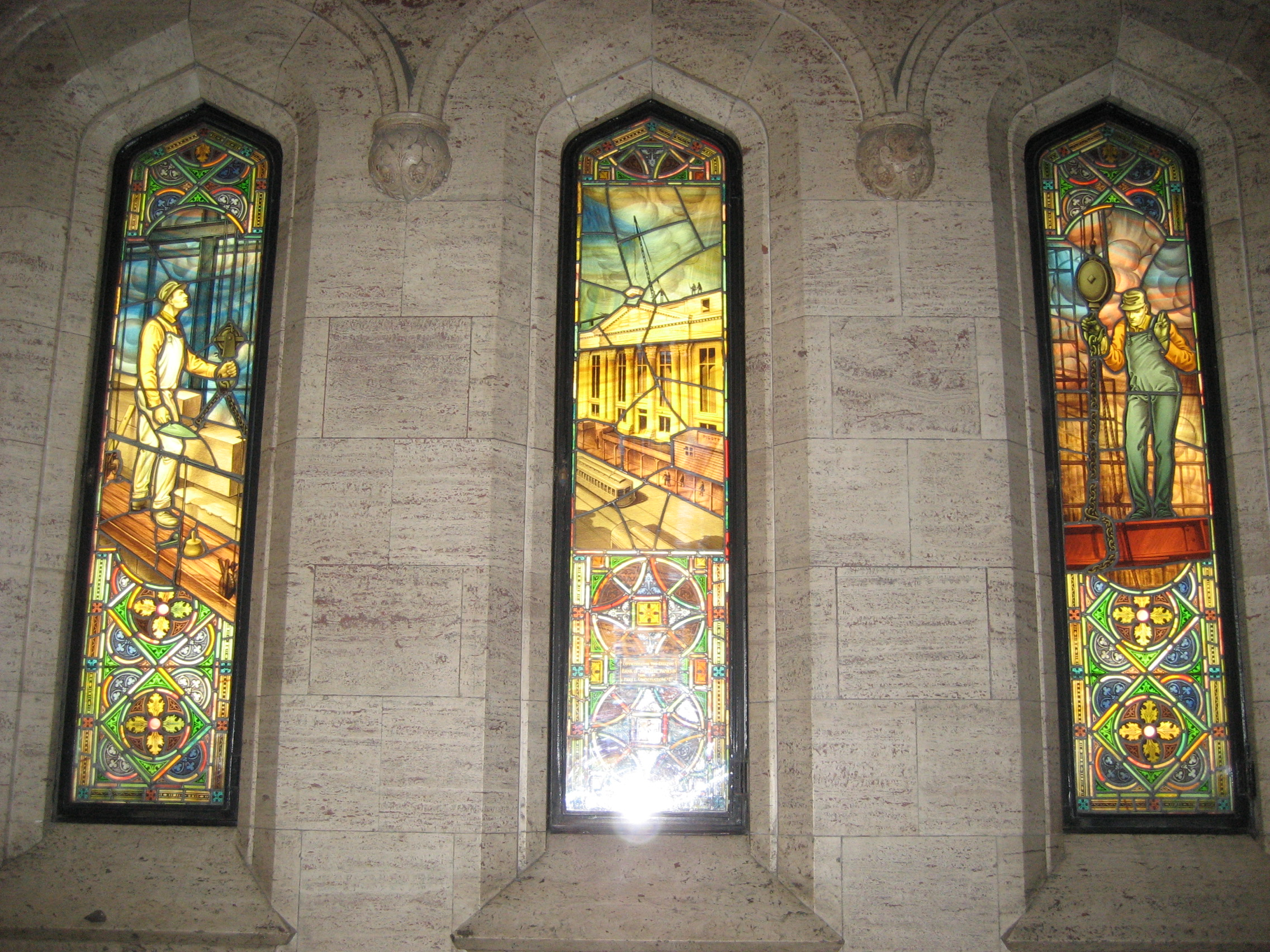
Lobby area, stained glass windows

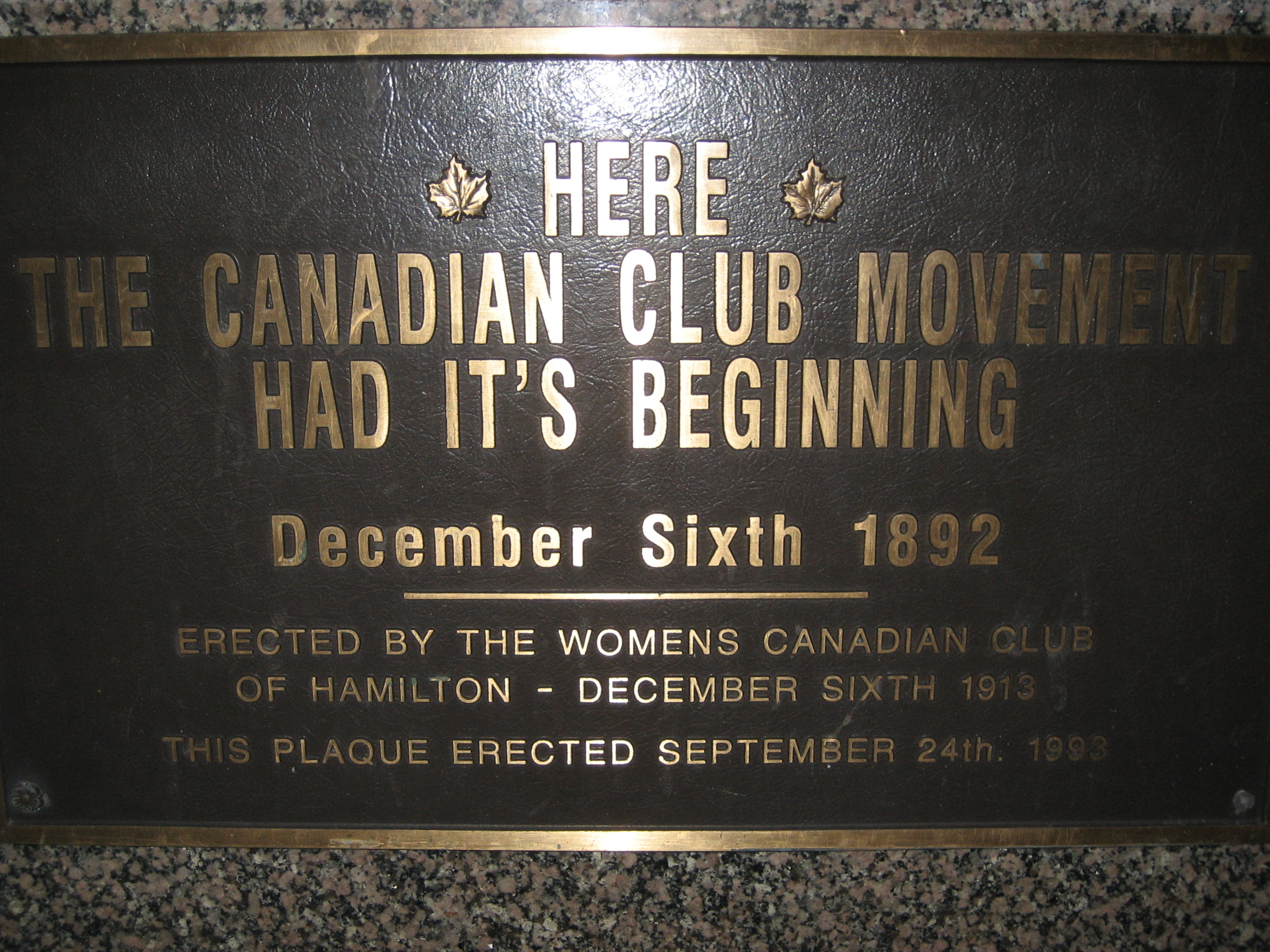
Canadian Club formation

== See also ==
- List of tallest buildings in Hamilton, Ontario
- Hamilton GO Centre
- Chateau Royale (Hamilton, Ontario)
