= Blueprint (disambiguation) =

A blueprint is a reproduction of a technical drawing or engineering drawing.

Blueprint may also refer to:

== Arts, entertainment and media ==
=== Literature ===
- Blueprint (Plomin book), a 2018 book on human genetics by Robert Plomin
- Blueprint (magazine), a former British architecture and design magazine
- Blueprint: Design Your Life, a defunct Martha Stewart magazine
- Blueprint (newspaper), a Nigerian daily newspaper
- Blueprint (novel), by Charlotte Kerner, 1999
- Blueprint (yearbook), of the Georgia Institute of Technology

=== Music ===
- Blueprint Records, record label, subsidiary of Voiceprint Records

==== Albums ====
- Blueprint (808 State album), 2011
- Blueprint (Alice Bag album), 2018
- Blueprint (Ferry Corsten album), 2017
- Blueprint (Natalie MacMaster album), 2003
- Blueprint (Rory Gallagher album), 1973
- The Blueprint, an album by Jay-Z, 2001
  - The Blueprint 2: The Gift & The Curse, by Jay-Z, 2002
  - The Blueprint 3, by Jay-Z, 2009
- Blueprints (album), by Wage War, 2015

==== Songs ====
- "blue print", a song by P-Model from the 1981 album Potpourri
- "Blueprint", a 1987 song by Rainbirds
- "Blueprint", a 2021 song by Slowly Slowly

=== Other uses in arts, entertainment and media ===
- Blueprint (film), a 2003 German drama
- Blue Print (video game), 1982
- Blueprint 3D, a 2011 puzzle video game

== People ==
- Blueprint (rapper) (Albert Andrew Shepard, born July 11, 1974)
- The Blueprint, wrestling ringname of Matt Morgan (born 1976)

== Science and technology ==
- Blueprint (CSS framework)
- Blueprint (engine), tuned to original specification
- Blueprints, a visual scripting system in Unreal Engine

== Other uses ==
- Blueprint Skateboards, a former British skateboard company
- Christchurch Central Recovery Plan, or the Blueprint, in New Zealand

== See also ==
- Blueprinting (disambiguation)
- Shweshwe, printed cotton fabric, known as blaudruck (German, 'blue print')
