= Charlotte Kerner =

German writer (born 1950)

- Born: 12 November 1950 (age 75); Speyer, West Germany
- Occupations: Journalist; writer
- Notable work: Blueprint
- Awards: Deutscher Jugendliteraturpreis

Charlotte Kerner (born 12 November 1950 in Speyer) is a German writer and journalist.

== Early life and education ==
Charlotte Kerner was born in Speyer, Rhineland-Palatinate, West Germany, where she spent her childhood. After studying economics and sociology in Mannheim, she initially worked on an urban sociology research project; this was followed by one-year study visits to Canada and the People's Republic of China.

== Career ==
Her experiences in Canada and China led her to write her first book in 1980 about the position of women and girls in China. As a journalist, she worked for GEO-Wissen, Die Zeit and Emma, among others, and as a press officer for the science competition Jugend forscht.

In her novels she deals with scientific topics, especially biomedicine, genetic engineering and anthropology. In these books, as well as in her biographies, she primarily explores women's lives psychologically, often focusing on natural scientists.

In 1987, she received the Deutscher Jugendliteraturpreis (German Youth Literature Prize) (non-fiction category) for the first time for her biography of Lise Meitner, Lise, Atomphysikerin. Die Lebensgeschichte der Lise Meitner, and then 13 years later, in 2000, in the youth book category, she received the same prize for the science fiction novel Blueprint, which was made into a film in 2004 with Franka Potente in the lead role. The novel, which was published in thirteen languages, accompanied Kerner on many reading tours, including at the invitation of the Goethe Institute, to Denmark, France and Israel, Kyrgyzstan and Uzbekistan as well as the USA and Israel.

In 2012, Kerner spent three months in the People's Republic of China and taught Chinese German students at various universities as a short-term lecturer for the German Academic Exchange Service.

Kerner lives with her family in Lübeck and sometimes in Pollença on Mallorca. In 2016, she collaborated with photographer Anja Doehring to produce the exhibition Sehnsuchtfels Mallorca in Lübeck.

== Selected publications ==
=== Novels ===
- Geboren 1999. Eine Zukunftsgeschichte [Born in 1999. A history of the future], Belz, Weinheim 1989, ISBN 3-407-80685-X.
- Blueprint. Roman, Weinheim 1999, ISBN 978-3-407-74102-8.
- Kopflos. Roman um ein wissenschaftliches Experiment [Headless. Novel about a scientific experiment] , Piper, München 2008, ISBN 978-3-492-27146-2.
- Jane reloaded, Beltz & Gelberg, Weinheim 2011, 214 S. ISBN 978-3-407-81092-2

=== Non-fiction and biography ===
- with Ann-Kathrin Scheerer: Jadeperle und Großer Mut. Chinesinnen zwischen gestern und morgen [Jade Pearl and Great Courage. Chinese Women Between Yesterday and Tomorrow], Maier, Ravensburg 1980, ISBN 3-473-35221-7.
- Lise, Atomphysikerin. Die Lebensgeschichte der Lise Meitner [Lise, atomic physicist. The life story of Lise Meitner], Beltz & Gelberg, Weinheim / Basel 1986, ISBN 3-407-80664-7.
- Seidenraupe, Dschungelblüte. Die Lebensgeschichte der Maria Sibylla Merian [Silkworm, jungle flower. The life story of Maria Sibylla Merian], Beltz und Gelberg, Weinheim 1988, ISBN 3-407-80675-2.
- Alle Schönheit des Himmels. Die Lebensgeschichte der Hildegard von Bingen [All the beauty of heaven. The life story of Hildegard of Bingen ], Beltz und Gelberg, Weinheim 1993
- Die Nonkonformistin. Die Lebensgeschichte der Designerin und Architektin Eileen Gray [The Nonconformist. The life story of the designer and architect Eileen Gray ], Beltz und Gelberg, Weinheim 2002, ISBN 978-3-492-27146-2.
- Rote Sonne, Roter Tiger – Rebell und Tyrann. Die Lebensgeschichte des Mao Zedong [Red Sun, Red Tiger – Rebel and Tyrant. The Life Story of Mao Zedong], Beltz und Gelberg, Weinheim 2015, ISBN 978-3-407-81196-7

=== Travel and photography ===
- with photographer Anna Doehring: Sehnsuchtsfels Mallorca – Porträt einer Insel [Sehnsuchtsfels Mallorca - Portrait of an Island], Wasmuth Verlag, Tübingen 2016, ISBN 978-3-8030-3379-6

=== Edited works ===
- Kinderkriegen. Ein Nachdenkbuch. [Having children. A book of reflection]Belz, Weinheim / Basel 1985, ISBN 3-407-80654-X.
- Nicht nur Madame Curie... Frauen, die den Nobelpreis bekamen [Not only Madame Curie... Women who received the Nobel Prize], Beltz und Gelberg, Weinheim 1990, ISBN 3-407-80691-4.
- Madame Curie und ihre Schwestern. Frauen, die den Nobelpreis bekamen [Madame Curie and her sisters. Women who received the Nobel Prize.], Belz, Weinheim / Basel 1997, ISBN 3-407-80845-3.
- Sternenflug und Sonnenfeuer. Porträts der Astronominnen Maria Cunitz, Caroline Herschel und Maria Mitchell. [Star flight and solar fire. Portraits of the astronomers ...], Weinheim 2004
- Die nächste GENeration. Science + Fiction [The next Generation], Belz, Weinheim 2009, ISBN 978-3-407-75346-5.
- Die Fantastischen 6. Die Lebensgeschichten von Mary Shelley, Bram Stoker, J. R. R. Tolkien, Stanislaw Lem, Philip K. Dick, Stephen King [The Fantastic 6. The life stories of ...] Beltz, Weinheim / Basel 2010, ISBN 978-3-407-81070-0.

== Film adaptations ==
- 1992: Geboren 1999 (Television film), director: Kai Wessel, screenplay: Beate Langmaack
- 2004: Blueprint, director: Rolf Schübel, screenplay: Claus Cornelius Fischer

== Awards ==
- 1979: 1st prize "Reporter der Wissenschaft"
- 1987: Deutscher Jugendliteraturpreis for Lise, Atomphysikerin. Die Lebensgeschichte der Lise Meitner
- 1997: GEDOK-Literaturpreis
- 2000: Deutscher Jugendliteraturpreis for Blueprint
