= Blueprinting =

Blueprinting may refer to:

- creating a blueprint, a reproduction of a technical drawing or engineering drawing
- a method of engine tuning to restore original design specifications

== See also ==
- Blueprint (disambiguation)
