= Artur Pontek =

Polish actor (born 1975)

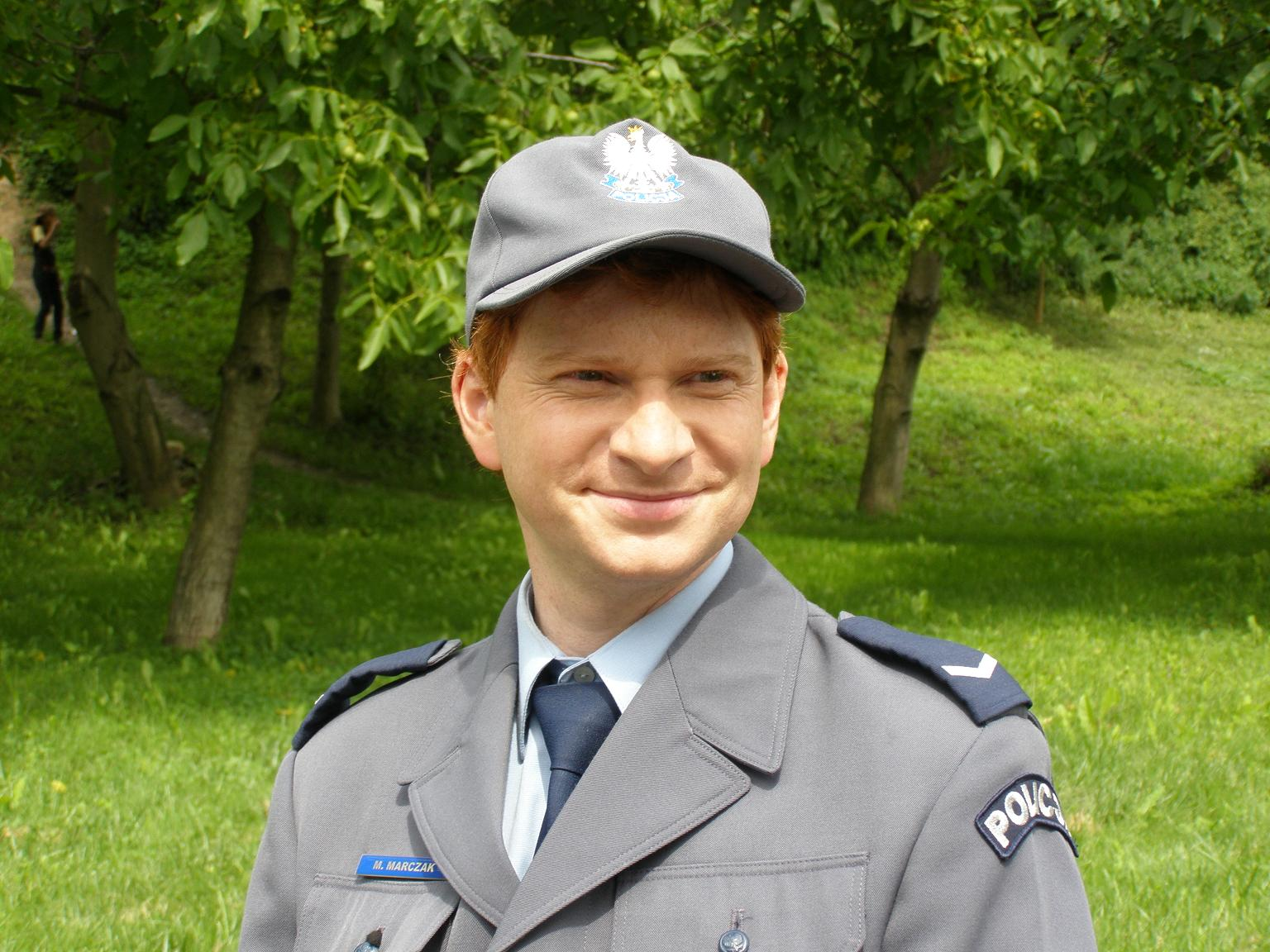
- Born: 10 May 1975 (age 51); Warsaw, Poland
- Occupations: Film, television, voice actor
- Years active: 1987 – present

Artur Pontek (en. Arthur Pontek) is a Polish actor, born in Warsaw on 10 May 1975.

== Biography ==
He studied in Warsaw, where he made his theatrical debut as Mephisto in "Holenderze Tułaczu" in the Zone 2 theatre. He has won multiple Wild Rose awards for best actor, granted by the Polish media, in 2001, 2003 and 2004.

== Filmography ==
- 1987: Misja Specjalna
- 1987: Sami dla siebie
- 1988: Skrzypce Rotszylda
- 1988: Banda Rudego Pająka – Pająk (en. Spider)
- 1988: Zmowa – Stasio Sitek
- 1989: Rififi po sześćdziesiątce
- 1989: Po własnym pogrzebie – the boy, who asking about stamps on Post Office
- 1990: Mów mi Rockefeller – Michał "Misio" Malinowski
- 1992: Das Heimweh des Walerjan Wrobel – Walerian Wróbel
- 1993 - Pajęczarki – Andrzej's friend
- 1994 - 1995: Spółka rodzinnna – Krzysiek (en. Chris)
- 1999: Skok
- 2001: Buła i spóła – Artek, Waldek's friend
- 2002-2003: Szpital na perypetiach – male nurse "Wiewiór" (en. "Squirrel")
- 2004-2007: Kryminalni – member of the police crew
- 2004: Rodzinka – Karol, Kinga's friend
- 2006: U fryzjera – Dyzio
- 2008: Ojciec Mateusz – policeman Marczak

== Polish dubbing ==
- 2005: Fillmore! – Fillmore
- 2005: American Dragon Jake Long – Jake
- 2005: The Buzz on Maggie – Aldrin
- 2007: High School Musical
- 2007: Alvin and the Chipmunks
- 2008: Sam & Max Season One
- 2009: Power Rangers Jungle Fury – Casey/ Red Ranger
- 2010: The Avengers: Earth's Mightiest Heroes – Bucky
- 2011: Scaredy Squirrel – Scaredy
