= Christchurch Central Recovery Plan =

Plan for rebuilding Christchurch after the 2011 earthquake

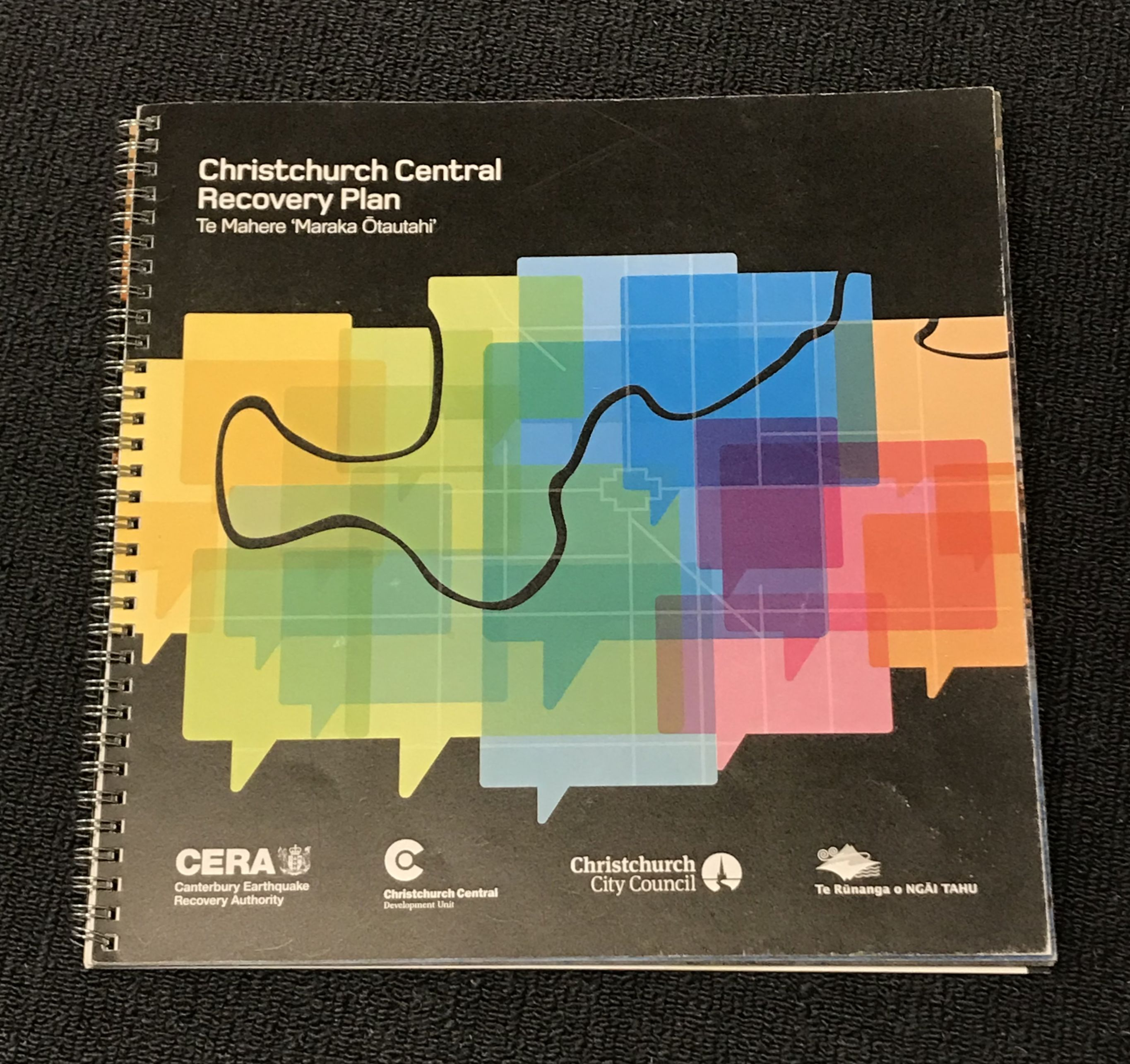
Hard copy of the July 2012 Christchurch Central Recovery Plan

The Christchurch Central Recovery Plan, often referred to as the Blueprint, is the plan developed by the Fifth National Government of New Zealand for the recovery of the Christchurch Central City from a series of earthquakes, in particular the February 2011 Christchurch earthquake. The Canterbury Earthquake Response and Recovery Act 2010 required the Christchurch City Council to develop a recovery plan for the central city. The plan, known as Share an Idea, was presented to the Minister for Canterbury Earthquake Recovery, Gerry Brownlee, in December 2011. Brownlee rejected the city council's plan, established the Canterbury Earthquake Recovery Authority (CERA), and tasked that organisation with developing a plan based on the city council's draft. The Christchurch Central Recovery Plan was published in July 2012 and defined 17 anchor projects. All projects where a timeline was specified were to have been finished by 2017; none of the 17 projects have been delivered on time and some have not even been started yet.

== Anchor projects ==
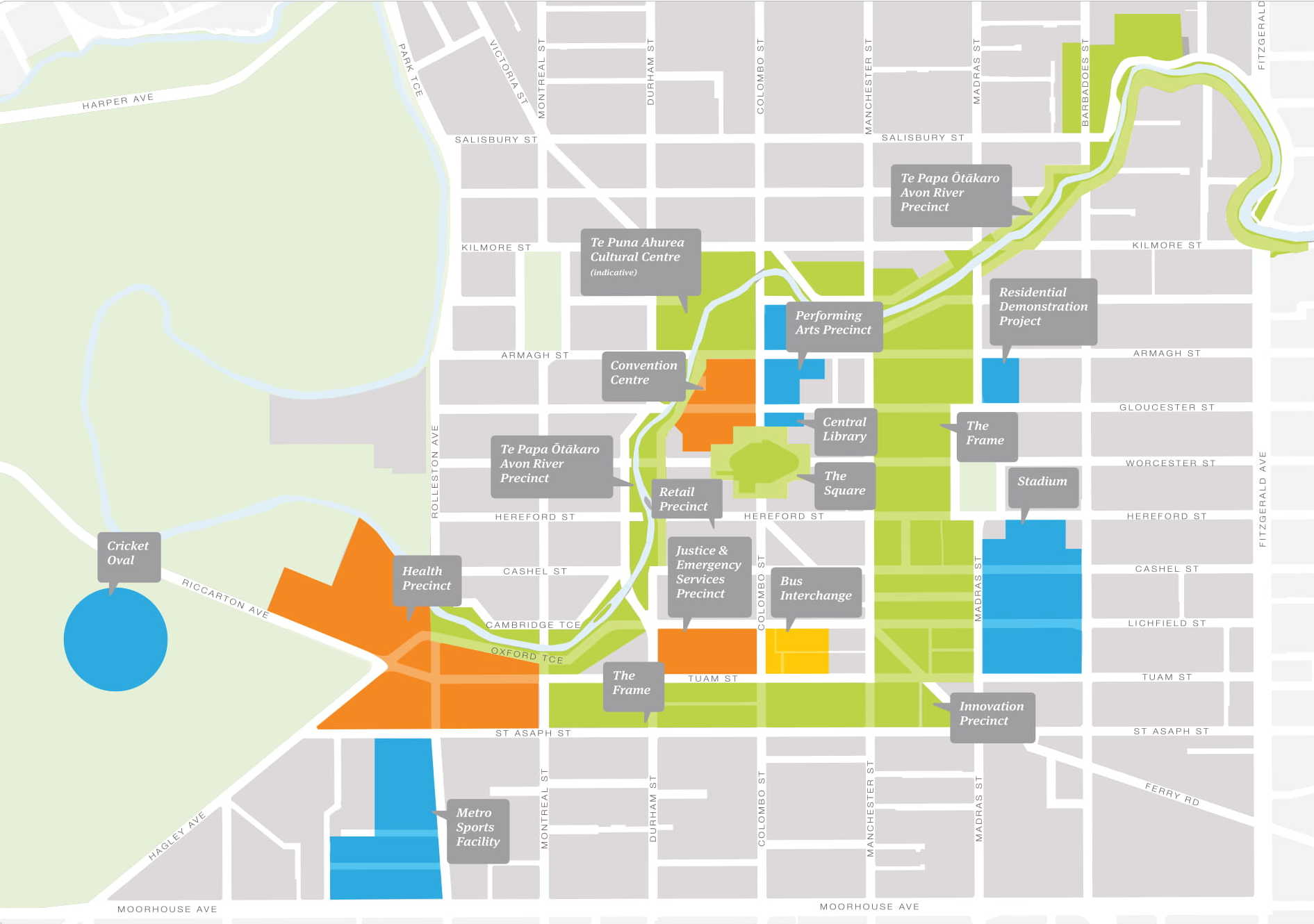
Map identifying the 17 anchor projects

The plan defined 17 anchor projects. There was tension between central government and the city council, the latter having had its Share an Idea plan rejected and the former imposing a very different plan. This tension culminated in Brownlee calling the mayor of Christchurch, Bob Parker, "a clown" in February 2012. Parker later revealed that receiving an apology from Brownlee stopped him from resigning his office. In August 2013, the city council then openly defied Brownlee's wish to have the Christchurch Town Hall demolished and a new venue built as part of the Performing Arts Precinct.

=== The Frame ===
A frame was created to help define a central area known as "the Core", which was to be of a scale appropriate to current demand. The Frame (Māori: Te Tāparepare) was to be in three parts (north, east, and south) (Note: The Frame is shown as number 6 on the designation plan.) and was to allow for short to medium term expansion and development of central Christchurch. The development of the Frame was led by CERA.

=== Earthquake Memorial ===
The national Earthquake Memorial is the Crown's official memorial for those killed or seriously injured in the 22 February 2011 Christchurch earthquake. The memorial was envisaged as a place of local, national and international significance where individuals could reflect and large groups can gather. The recovery plan did not indicate a location for the memorial. (Note: The Earthquake Memorial is therefore not shown on the designation plan.) The project was led by the Ministry for Culture and Heritage and the memorial was opened for the February 2017 earthquake anniversary.

=== Te Puna Ahurea Cultural Centre ===
A world class cultural centre was proposed for the north-west corner of Victoria Square on the site of the former Crowne Plaza. (Note: Although the site had been occupied by a private hotel, the land was owned by Christchurch City Council; a land designation was therefore not needed.) This centre was planned as a focal point for cultural celebration and diversity, and was to be led by Te Rūnanga o Ngāi Tahu. Ngāi Tahu abandoned this project in April 2016.

The Frame, Earthquake Memorial, and Te Puna Ahurea Cultural Centre
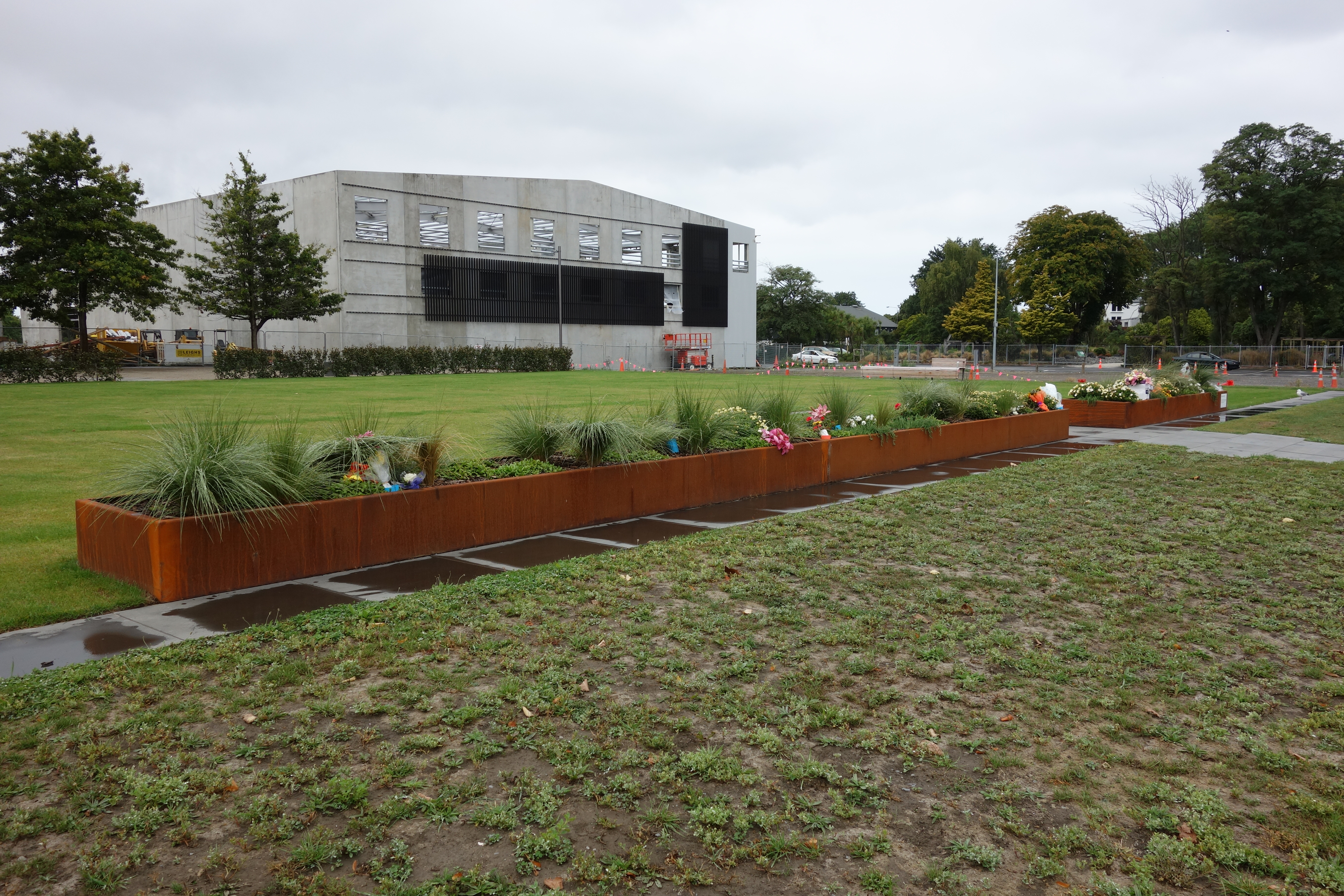
North Frame: commemorative site where the Pyne Gould Corporation building collapsed

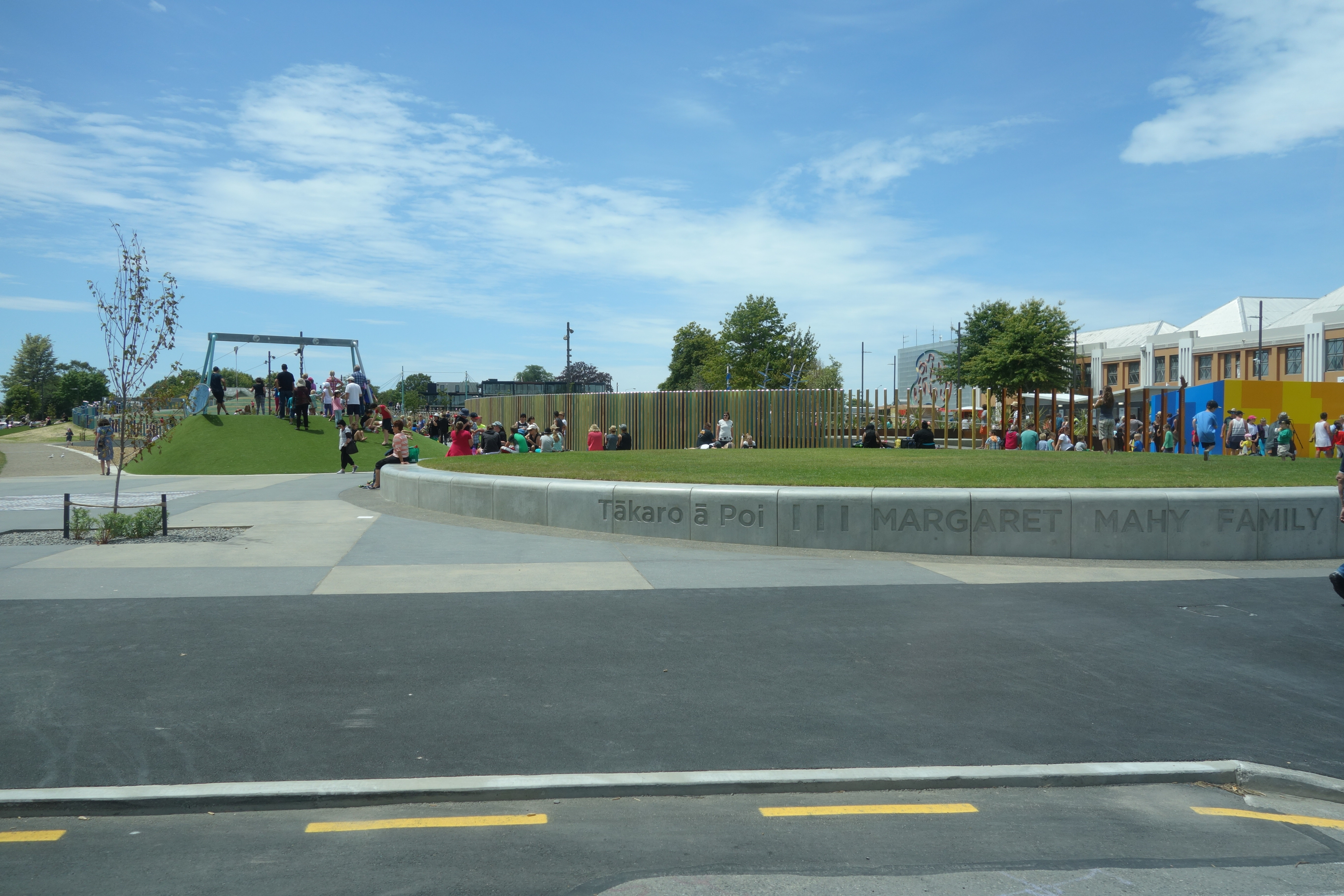
East frame: Margaret Mahy Playground

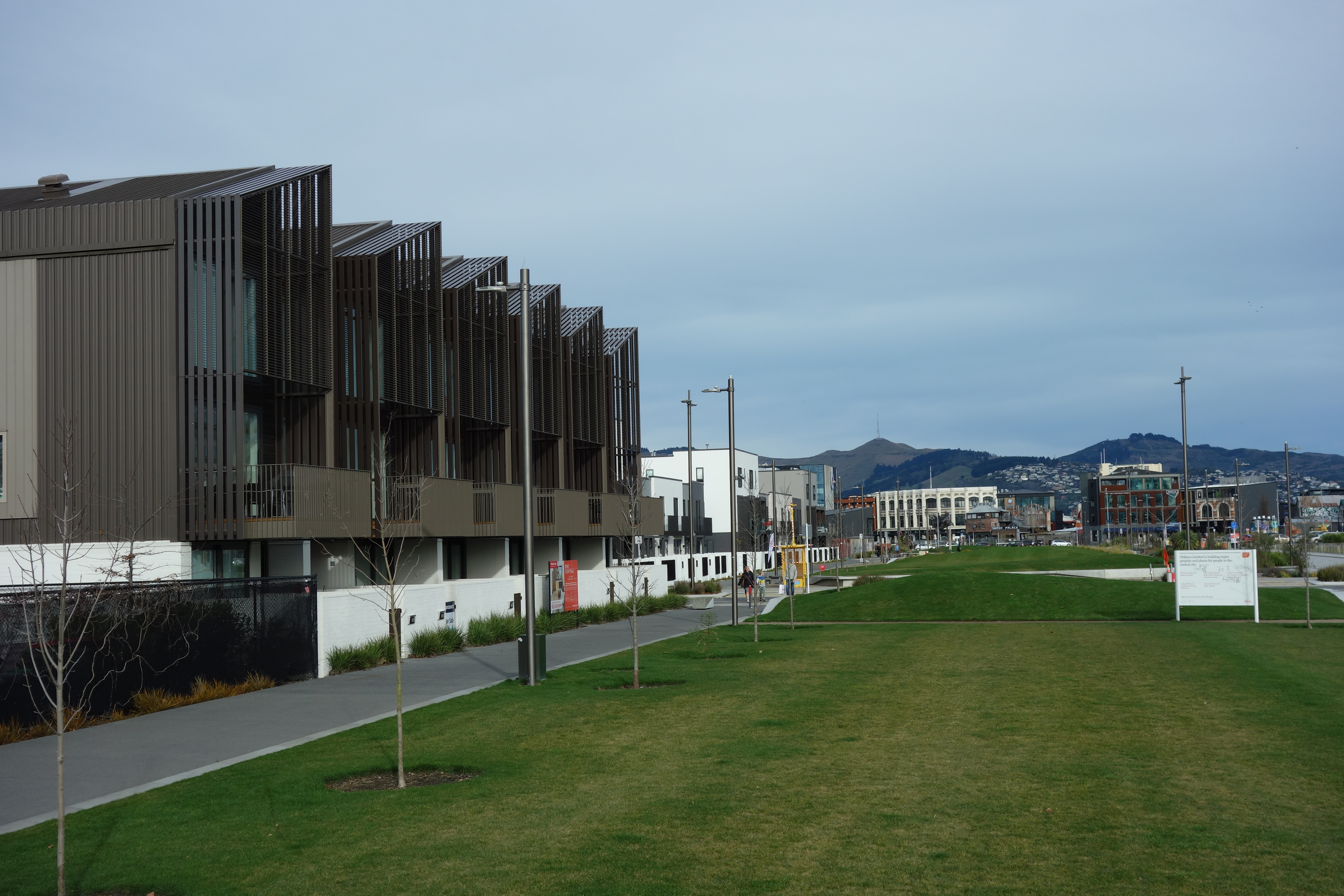
East frame: apartment buildings and a linear park

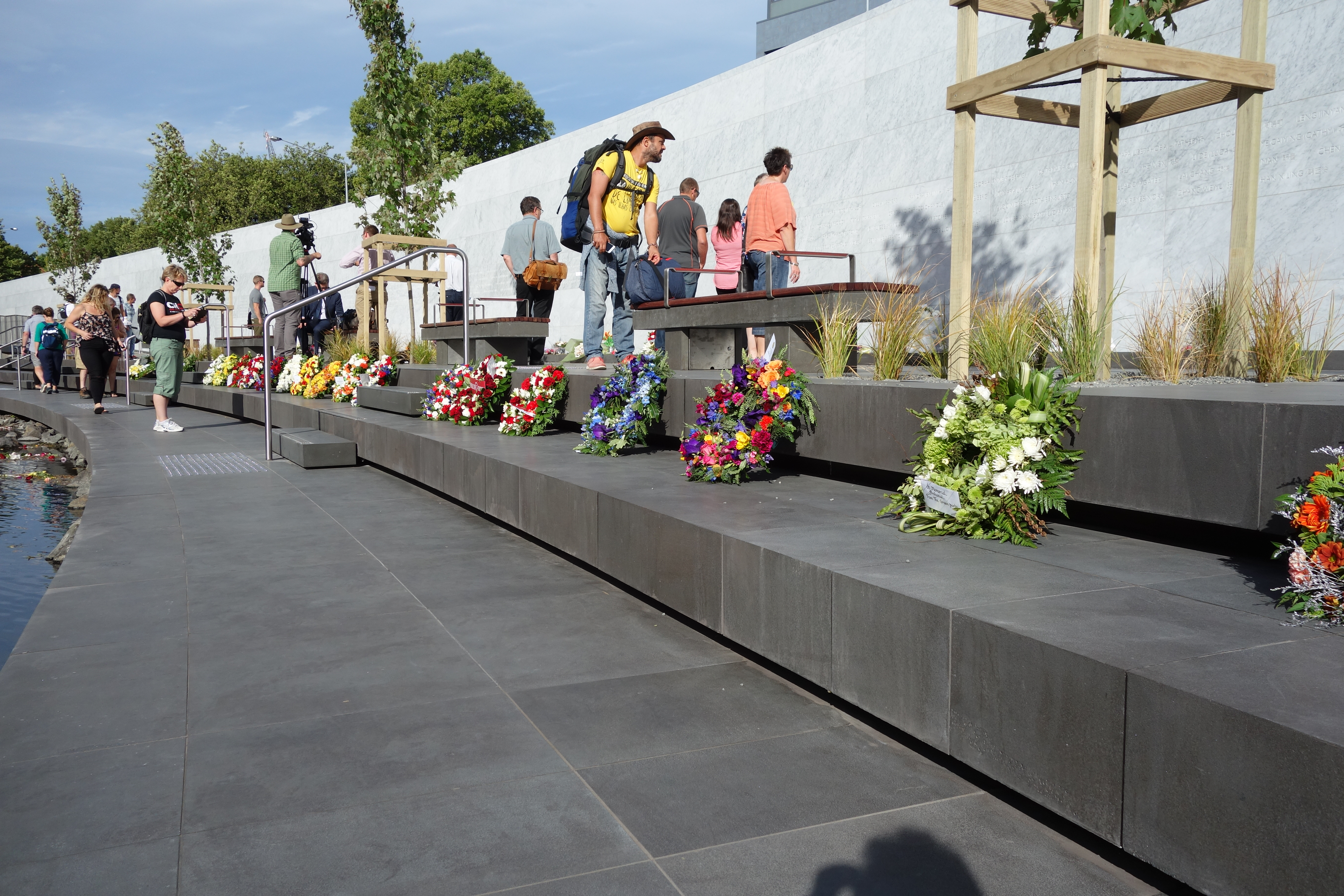
Canterbury earthquake memorial on its opening day

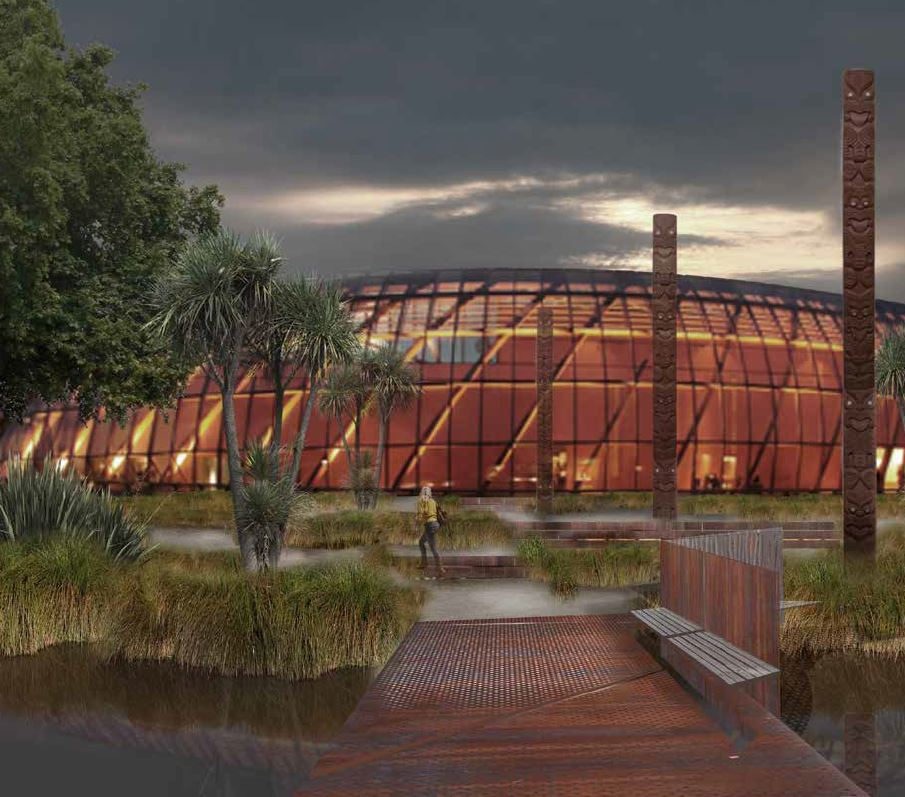
Concept drawing for Te Puna Ahurea Cultural Centre

=== Avon River Precinct ===
The Avon River Precinct (Māori: Te Papa Ōtākaro and Te Papa o Ōtākaro in the initial version of the recovery plan) was the redevelopment of the Avon River corridor through the central city, from the Antigua Street bridge at Christchurch Hospital to the Fitzgerald Avenue bridge at the eastern border of the central city. The park zoning extended 30 metres (98 ft) from either side of the river and included a proposed redevelopment of Victoria Square. (Note: No land was designated for the proposed work in the Avon River Precinct.) The project was jointly led by CERA and Christchurch City Council.

=== The Square ===
In a project led by Christchurch City Council, Cathedral Square was to be restored as the civic heart of the central city. CERA's regeneration plan proposed lower buildings on the north side to prevent shading (although when Christchurch City Council requested in 2019 that the Crown's rebuild agency take into consideration shading that would be caused by a proposed nine-storey hotel that is part of the convention centre, the request was denied) with little detail provided. (Note: No land was designated for the Square project.) The plan did mention the proposed central library and the convention centre, both planned as anchor projects for the north side of The Square, as well as space being "kept for a new cathedral", but was otherwise short on detail. The new library (Tūranga) opened in 2018; as of 2020, the convention centre is under construction, and the repair of the existing cathedral commenced in May 2020.

=== Retail Precinct ===
The development of the Retail Precinct was left to the private sector. (Note: No land was designated for the Retail Precinct.) By October 2011, private interests had combined and opened a temporary container mall known as Re:START, with Ballantynes, Christchurch's remaining department store, as the retail anchor. The project was a huge success and gained international attention for its quirkiness. In June 2014, about half the container mall moved to a different site to make way for a construction project. Re:START closed in January 2018.

The development of permanent buildings in the Retail Precinct proceeded much more slowly than expected. The delay was caused by the planning rule imposed by CERA that each development project must have at least 5,000 square metres (54,000 sq ft) of land. As land was in multiple ownerships, with each title significantly smaller than the stipulated minimum, developers struggled to amalgamate enough land before they could seek planning permission. To break the deadlock, the Christchurch Central Development Unit (CCDU, a subsidiary of CERA) bought up much of the land to overcome the disjointed ownership.

Avon River Precinct, The Square, and Retail Precinct
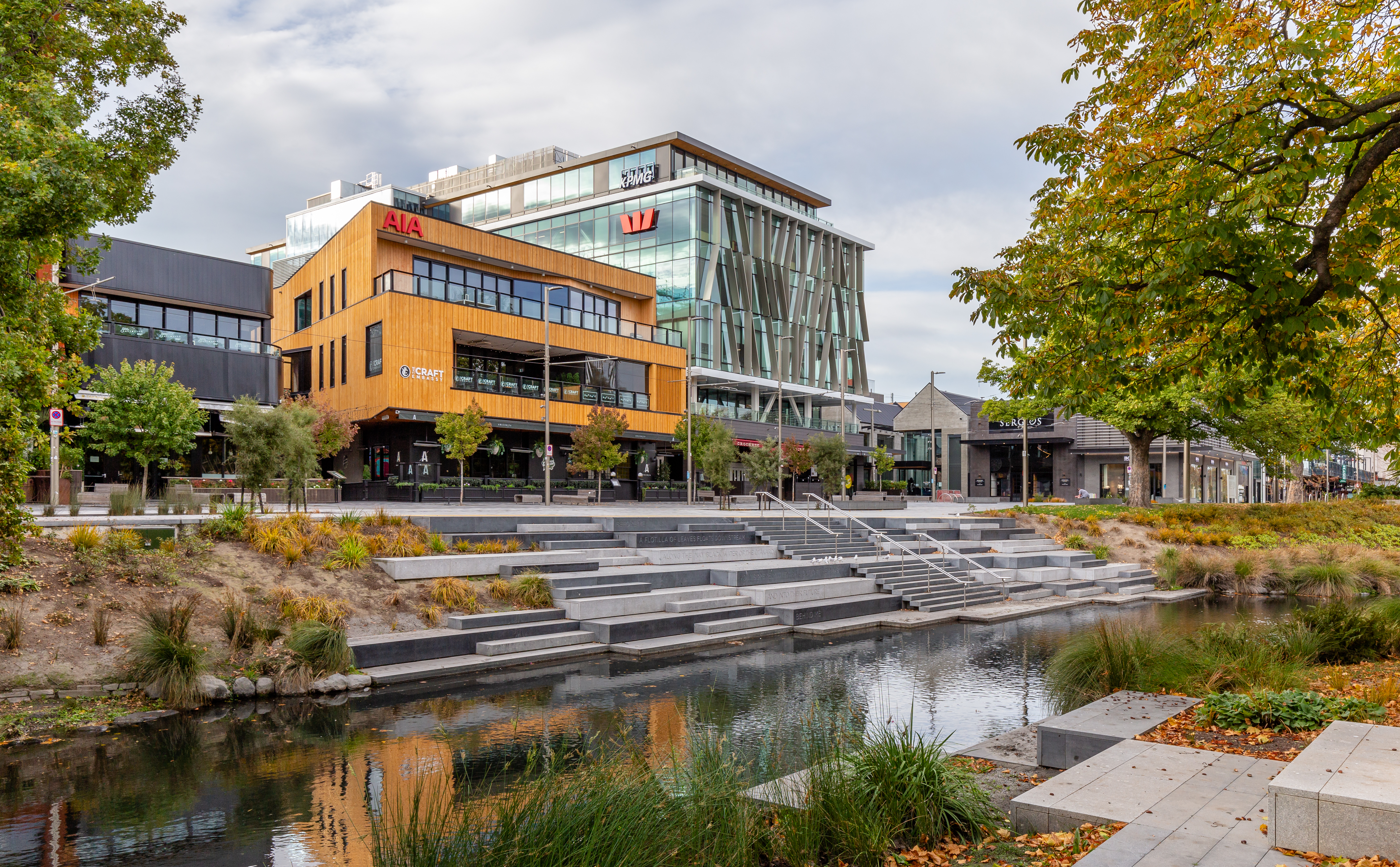
Avon River Precinct: steps down to the river, with The Terrace project as a backdrop

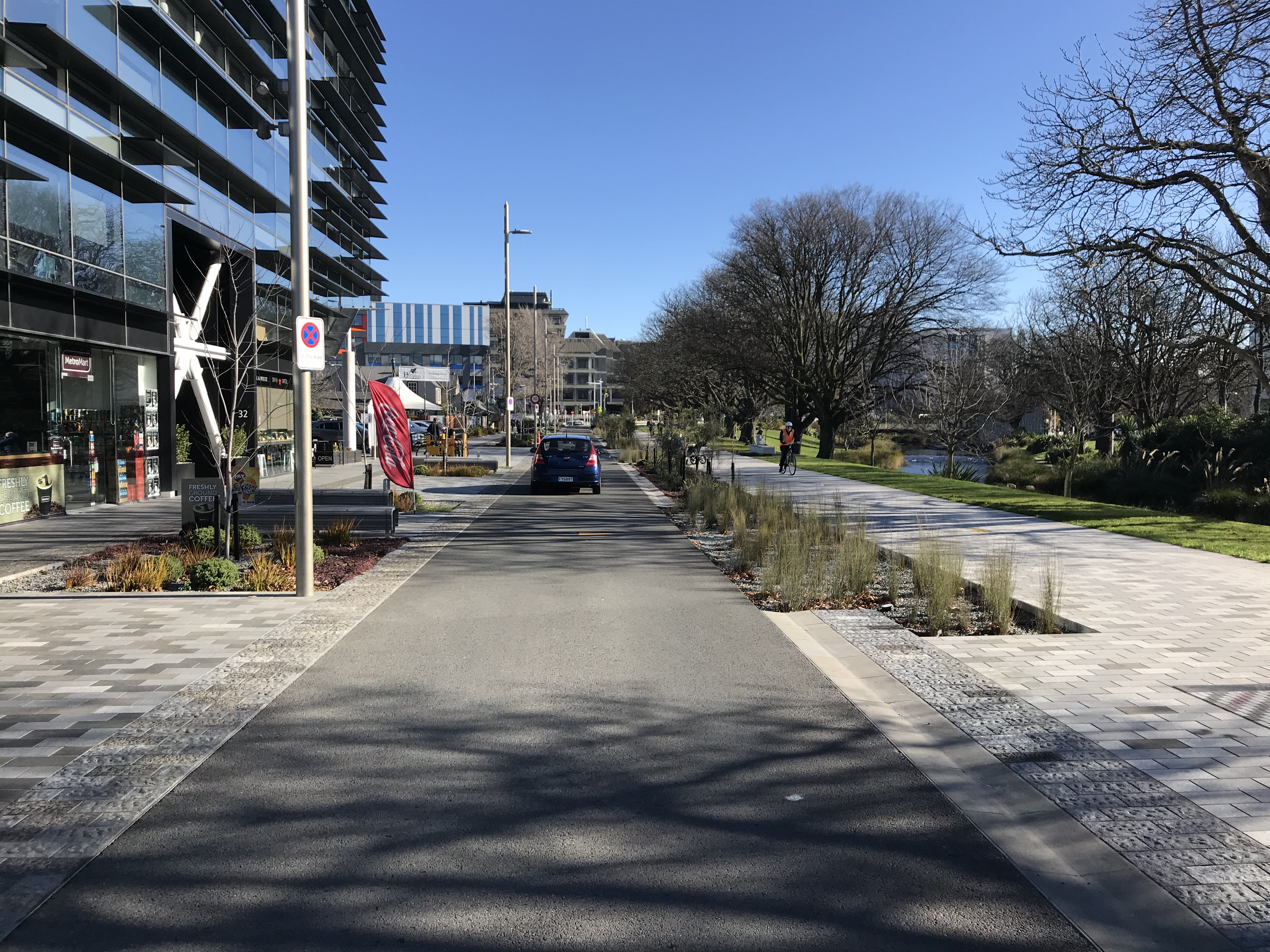
Avon River Precinct: Oxford Terrace, with a Health Precinct building on the left

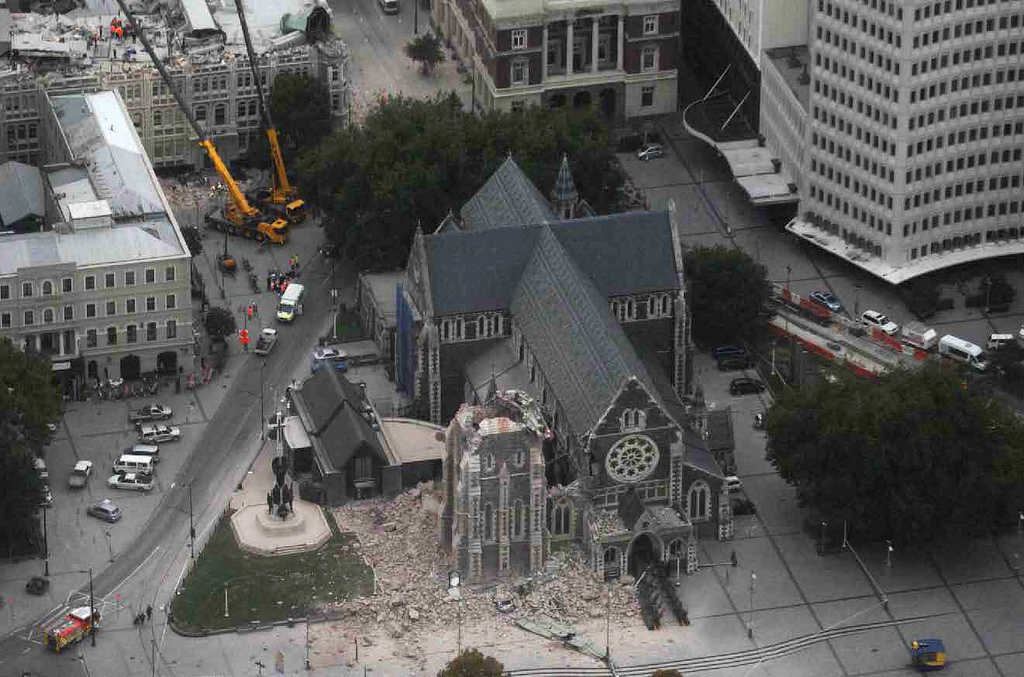
The Square: aerial photo from February 2011

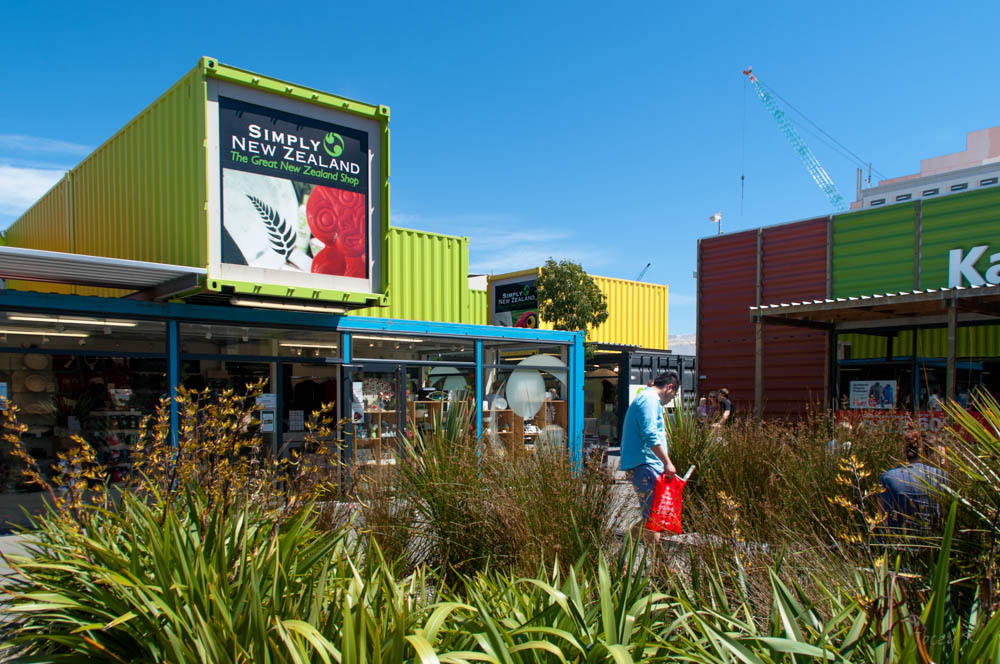
Retail Precinct: temporary use for a container mall

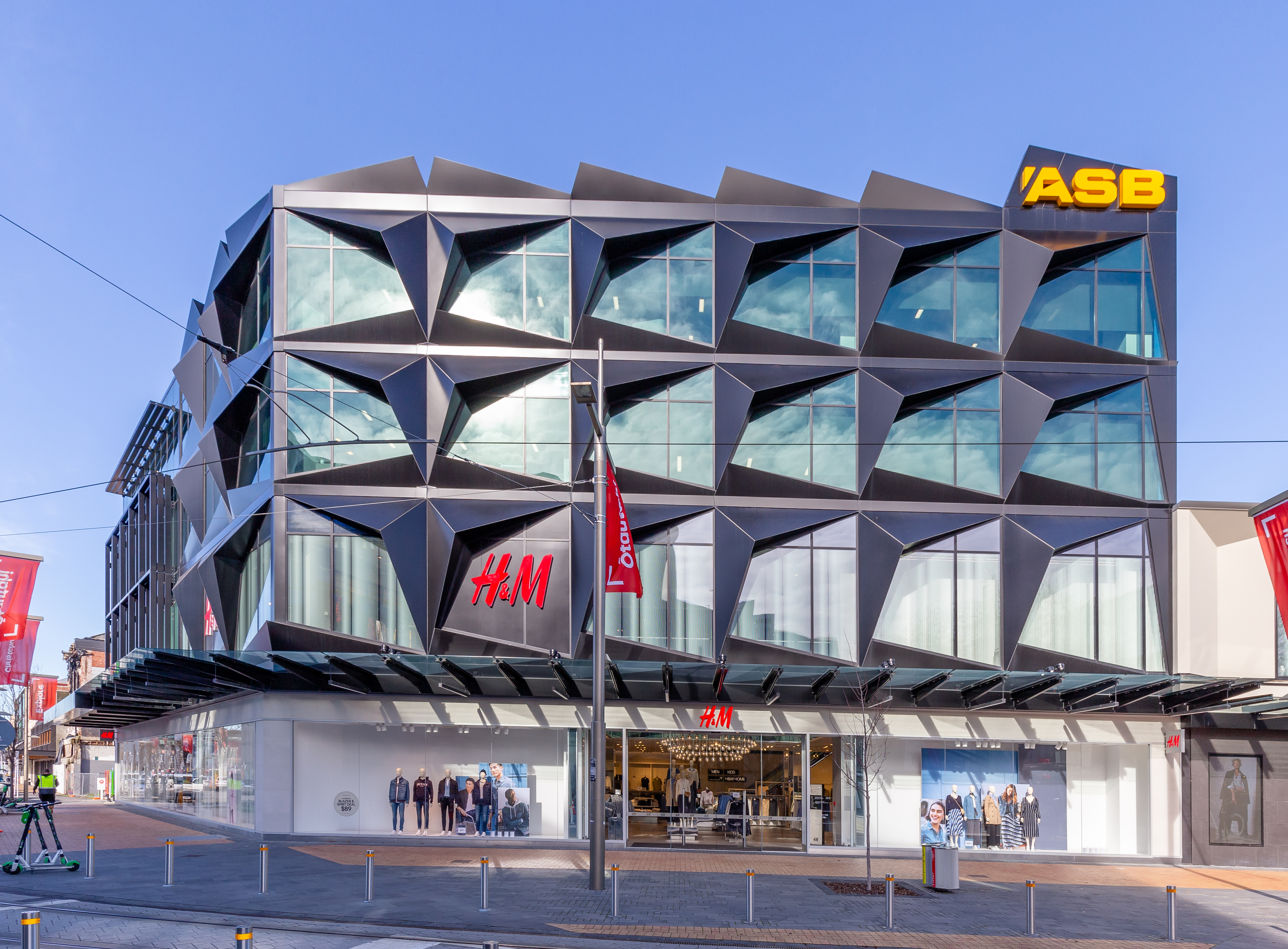
Retail Precinct: New retail and office building at the corner of Cashel and High streets

=== Convention Centre Precinct ===
The Convention Centre Precinct was led by CERA. Apart from the convention centre itself, given the name Te Pae in 2018, it comprises a number of buildings (mainly hotels). The Crown purchased most buildings on two city blocks (with the exception of Rydges Hotel, the car parking building behind it, the building known as Caffe Roma – none of those on designated land, and Isaac House, which was on designated land but was allowed to remain) and closed Gloucester Street. (Note: The Convention Centre Precinct is shown as number 1 on the designation plan.) After many delays, Te Pae was to have opened in October 2020 but due to the COVID-19 pandemic, it opened in December 2021. The original plan was for the Crown to partner with private companies, e.g. hotel developers, to build a complete precinct. This was later scaled back to the convention centre itself, with the Crown the sole developer. One of the planned hotels, a five-star outfit, was announced for the corner of Colombo Street and Cathedral Square (facing Gloucester Street) in 2017, with the Crown looking for a developer. All hotel sites at Te Pae, plus the block of land designated for the Performing Arts Precinct located north of Gloucester Street, was bought by the Carter Group. Philip Carter hopes to have the five-star hotel open by April 2023, and will then build one or two more hotels on the remaining Te Pae land.

=== Health Precinct ===
The Health Precinct (Māori: Te Papa Hauora) is a project to be delivered by the private sector adjacent to Christchurch Hospital, incorporating part of the South Frame. (Note: The Health Precinct was proposed to be located in part of the South Frame, which is shown as number 6 on the designation plan.) The idea was to concentrate those facilities that are health and research-related in close proximity to the existing hospital. The first major private investment into healthcare, Forté Health, opened in February 2014 far away from the Health Precinct.

=== Justice and Emergency Services Precinct ===
The Justice and Emergency Services Precinct houses government and emergency services on three-quarters of a city block surrounded by Durham Street, Lichfield Street, Colombo Street, and Tuam Street. (Note: The Justice and Emergency Services Precinct is shown as number 4 on the designation plan. The whole block got designated but the Crown sold the land facing Colombo Street to a private developer; Hoyts EntX was built on that site.) The development was undertaken by the relevant government agencies (Justice, Police, Corrections, Courts, and Fire Service). The building officially opened on 12 September 2017 (just days prior to the 2017 general election) but staff did not move in for another month. It has been too small for the 1100 staff from the beginning.

Convention Centre, Health, and Justice and Emergency Services precincts
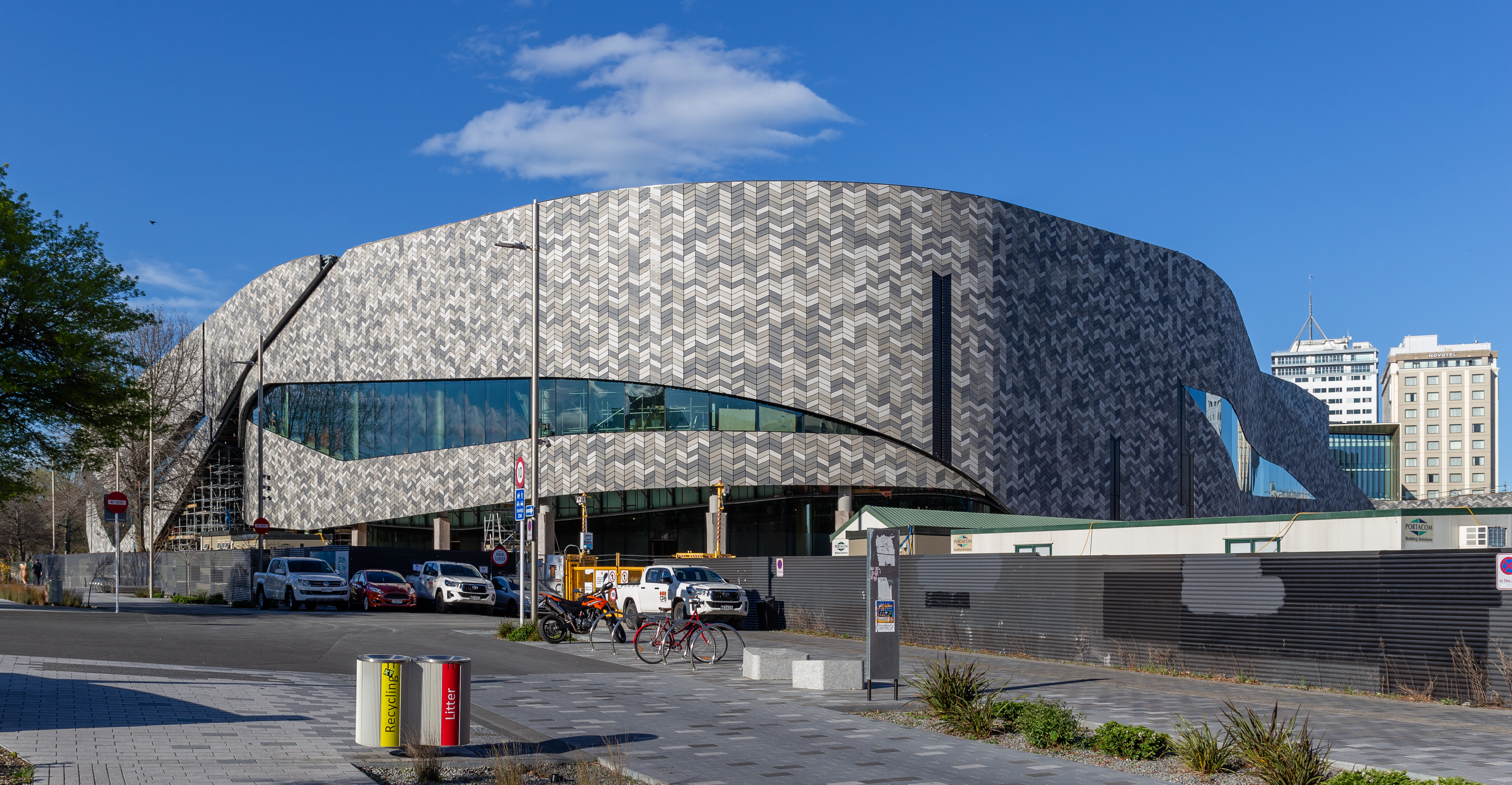
Convention Centre: Te Pae (the convention centre) seen from the south-west

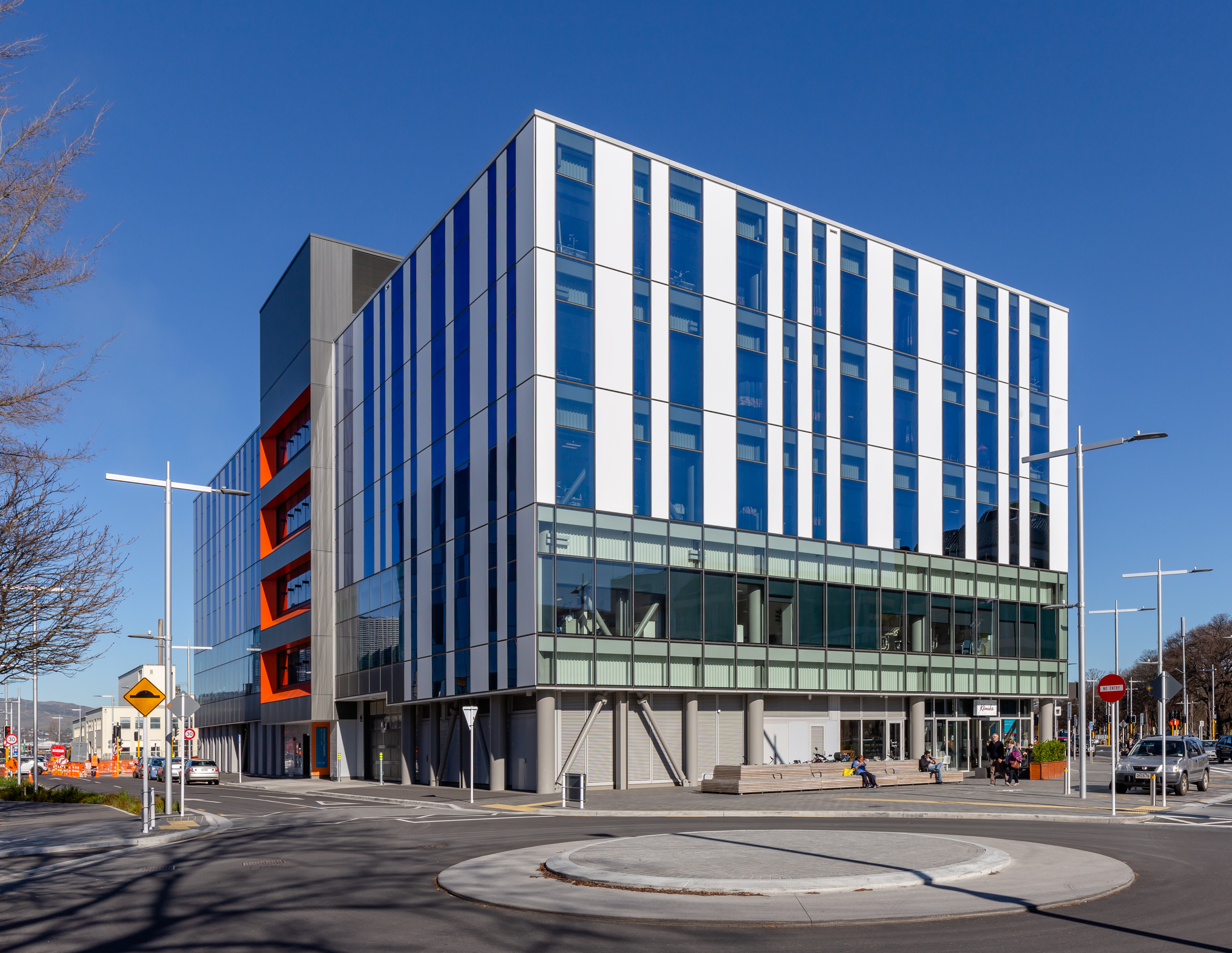
Health Precinct: Christchurch Outpatients Building adjacent to the hospital

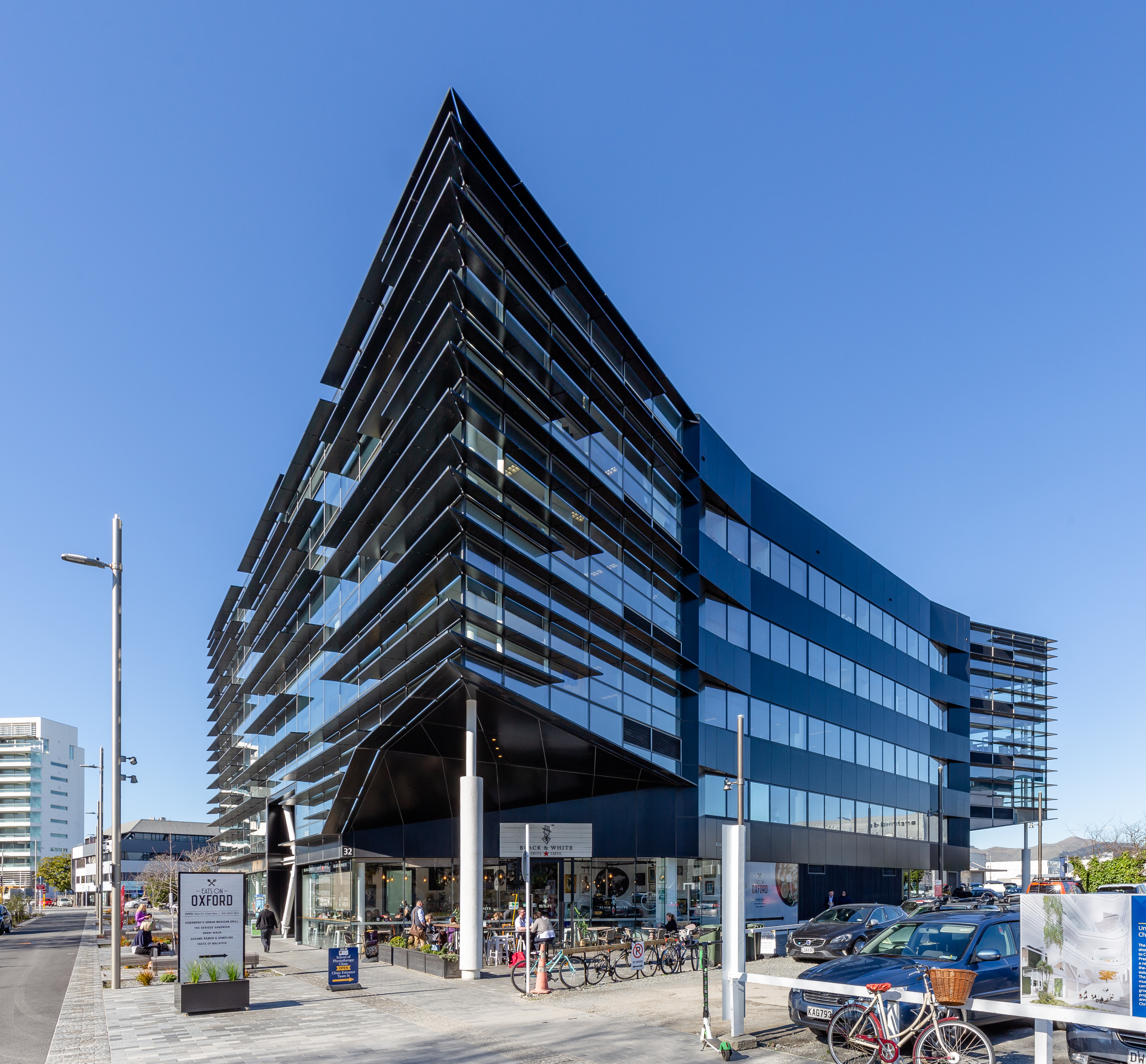
Health Precinct: School of Physiotherapy Clinics Christchurch of the University of Otago

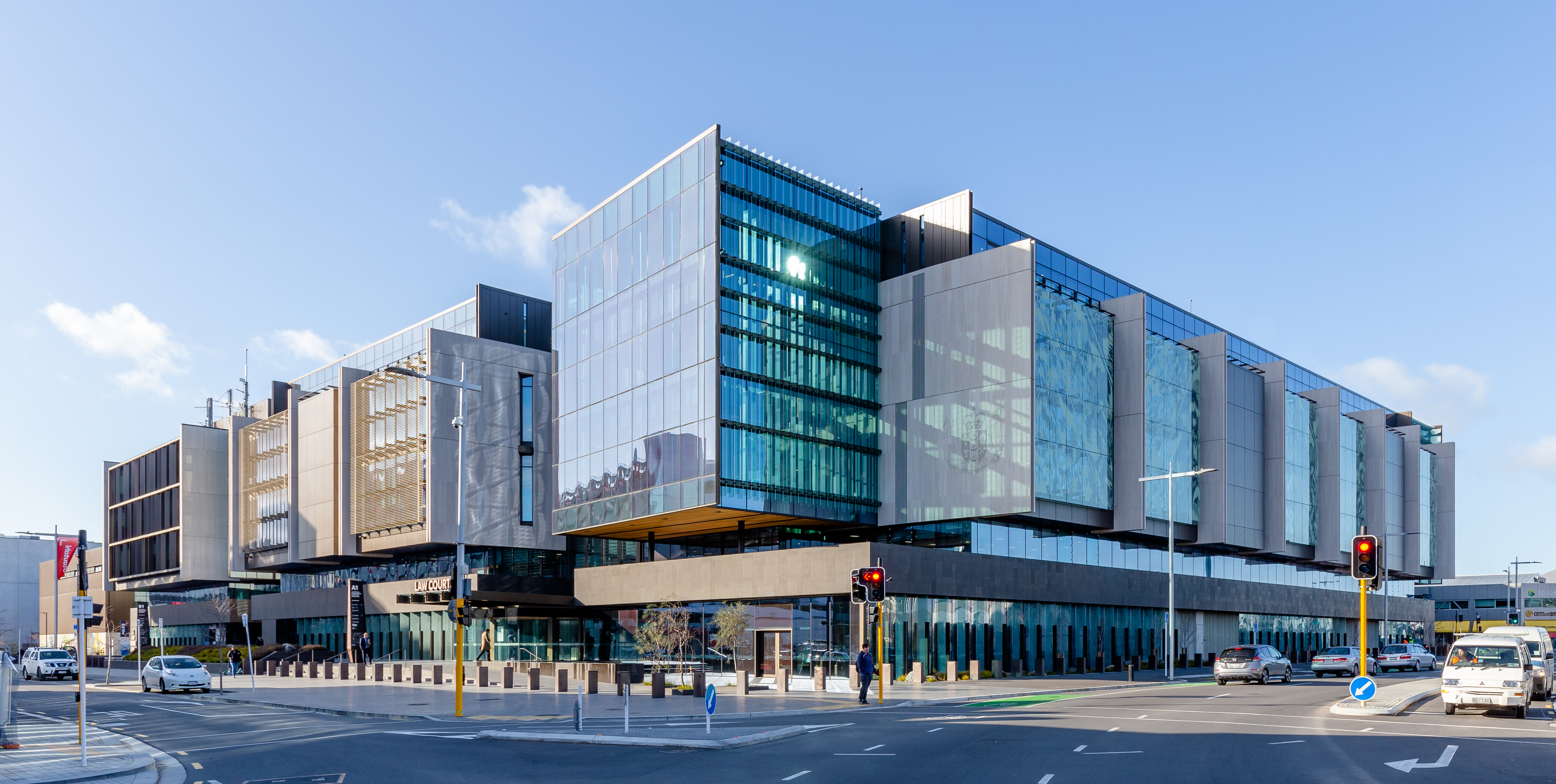
Justice and Emergency Services Precinct: view of the complex

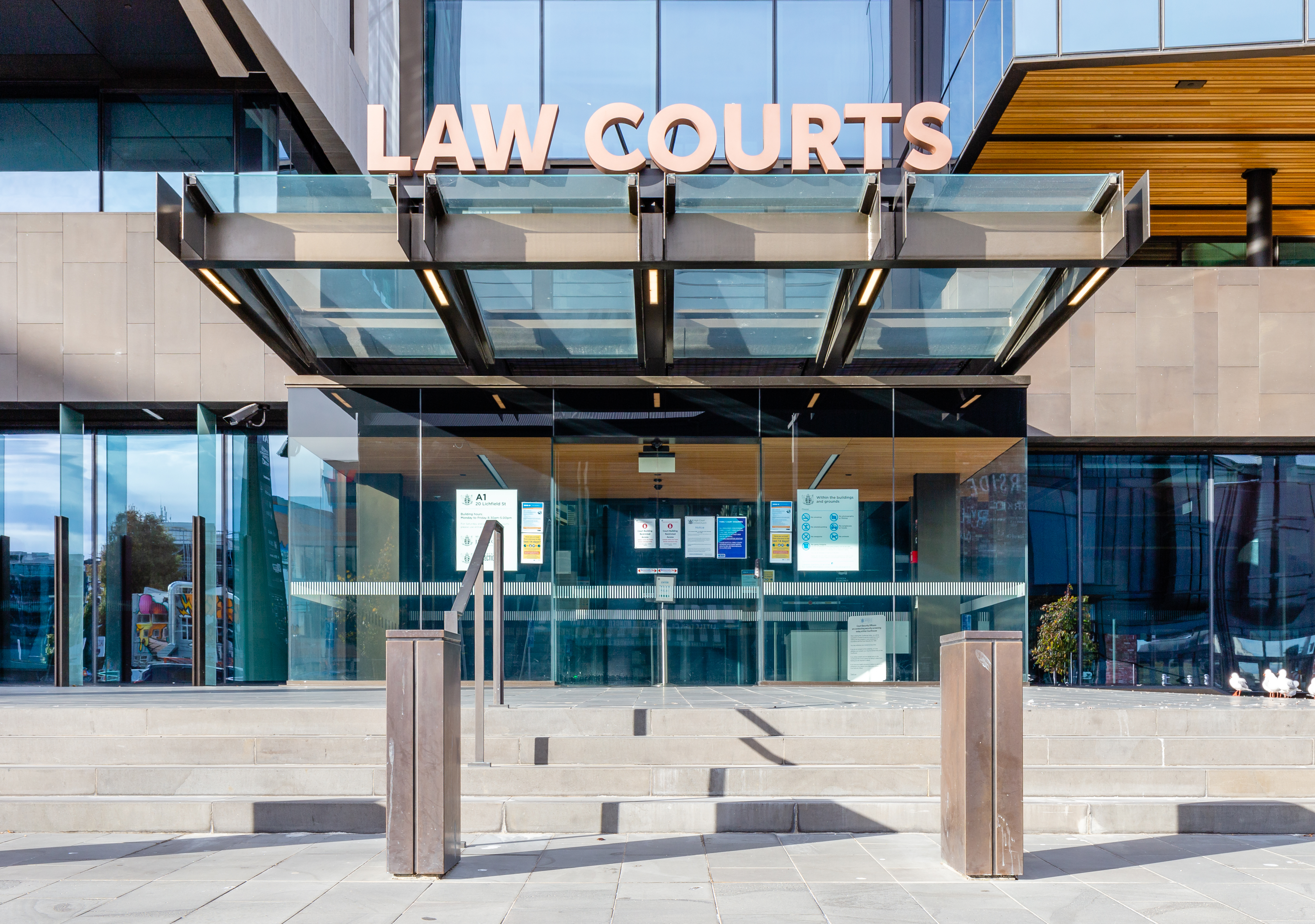
Justice and Emergency Services Precinct: entrance of the law courts

=== Performing Arts Precinct ===
The Performing Arts Precinct was a development led by CERA, covering parts of two city blocks. (Note: The Performing Arts Precinct is shown as number 2 on the designation plan.) The designated land allowed for the Christchurch Town Hall to be rebuilt on the site, and was to possibly include a performing arts centre with two auditoria, to host the Court Theatre, the Christchurch Symphony Orchestra, the Music Centre of Christchurch, and it acknowledged the Isaac Theatre Royal that is located within this designation. In a vote by the city council to restore the town hall in contradiction to the Blueprint, a vote that many regarded as a sign for the city council wanting to take back control, the Performing Arts Precinct was derailed. By 2020, only two projects have proceeded (restoration of the Isaac Theatre Royal and construction of the performance venue The Piano); both delivered by the private sector. The Court Theatre is expected to move into the Performing Arts Precinct in 2023. The northern half of the designated land was acquired by the Carter Group and the Roman Catholic Diocese of Christchurch in 2019 for church and education purposes. The land in the southern block occupied by the Forsyth Barr Building was also taken out of the designation upon the decision to convert the office building to a hotel; it is now occupied by the Crowne Plaza Christchurch.

=== Central Library ===
The project lead for the central library, named Te Whare Pukapuka Matua in the Blueprint, was Christchurch City Council. Located at the north side of Cathedral Square, (Note: The Central Library is shown as number 3 on the designation plan.) it opened in October 2018. Named Tūranga, the building is regarded as iconic and has won a number of awards.

=== Residential Demonstration Project ===
The Residential Demonstration Project (Māori: Whakaaturanga Kāinga) is a private development, enabled through the Crown providing 8,000 square metres (86,000 sq ft) of land north of Latimer Square. (Note: The Residential Demonstration Project is shown as number 9 on the designation plan.) The developer was chosen through a design competition in 2013 but in November 2015, CCDU confirmed that the project would not go ahead; it was the first anchor project that had failed to proceed. In an analysis published in the Lincoln Planning Review, the author described the Crown's approach to the project as displaying a "level of naïve neoliberal faith that the markets could deliver urban regeneration to a badly damaged city [that] was not seen even in Margaret Thatcher’s Britain".

Performing Arts Precinct, Central Library, and Residential Demonstration Project
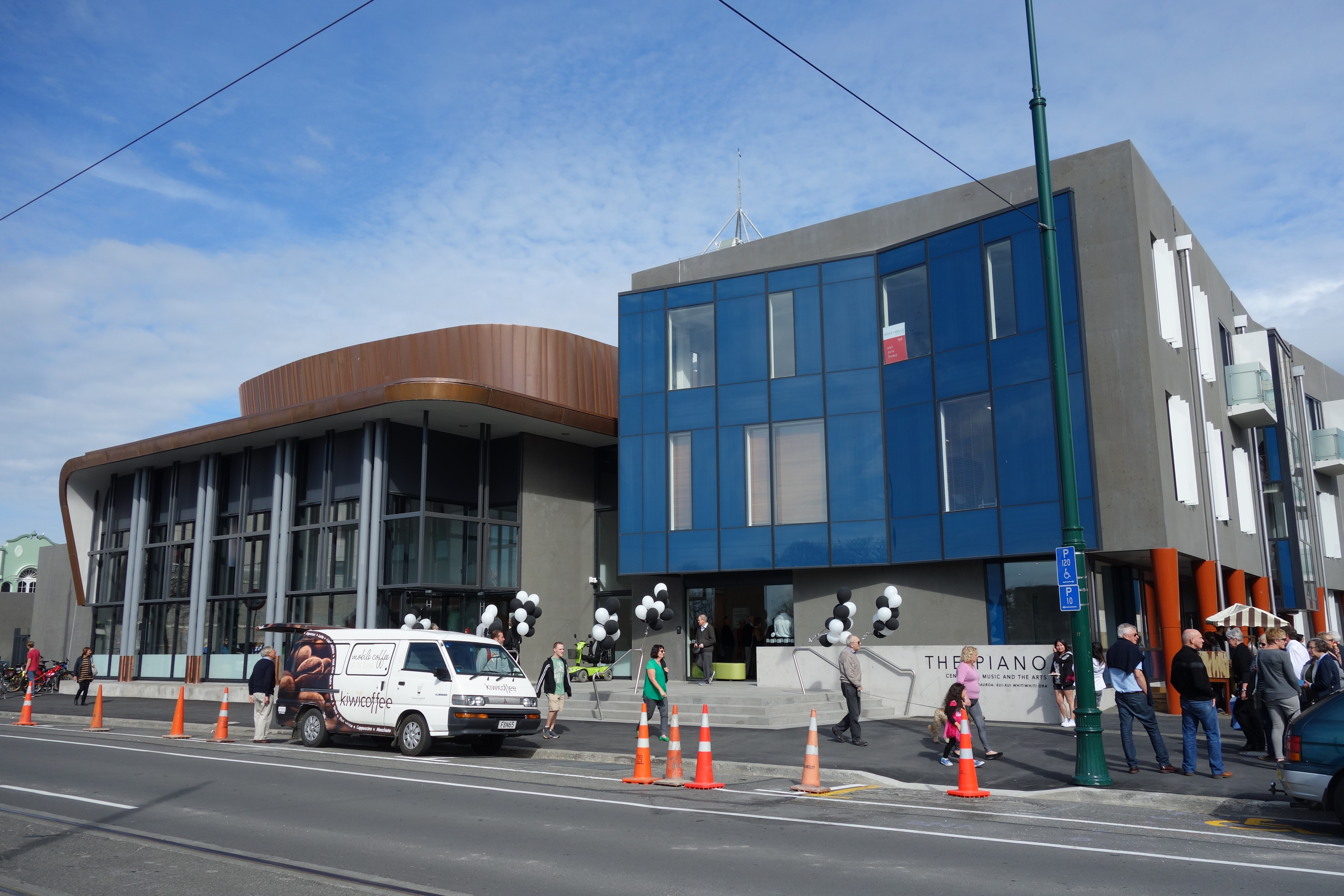
Performing Arts Precinct: The Piano was a private sector initiative

Performing Arts Precinct: The land north of Armagh Street has been taken out of the designation and is still empty

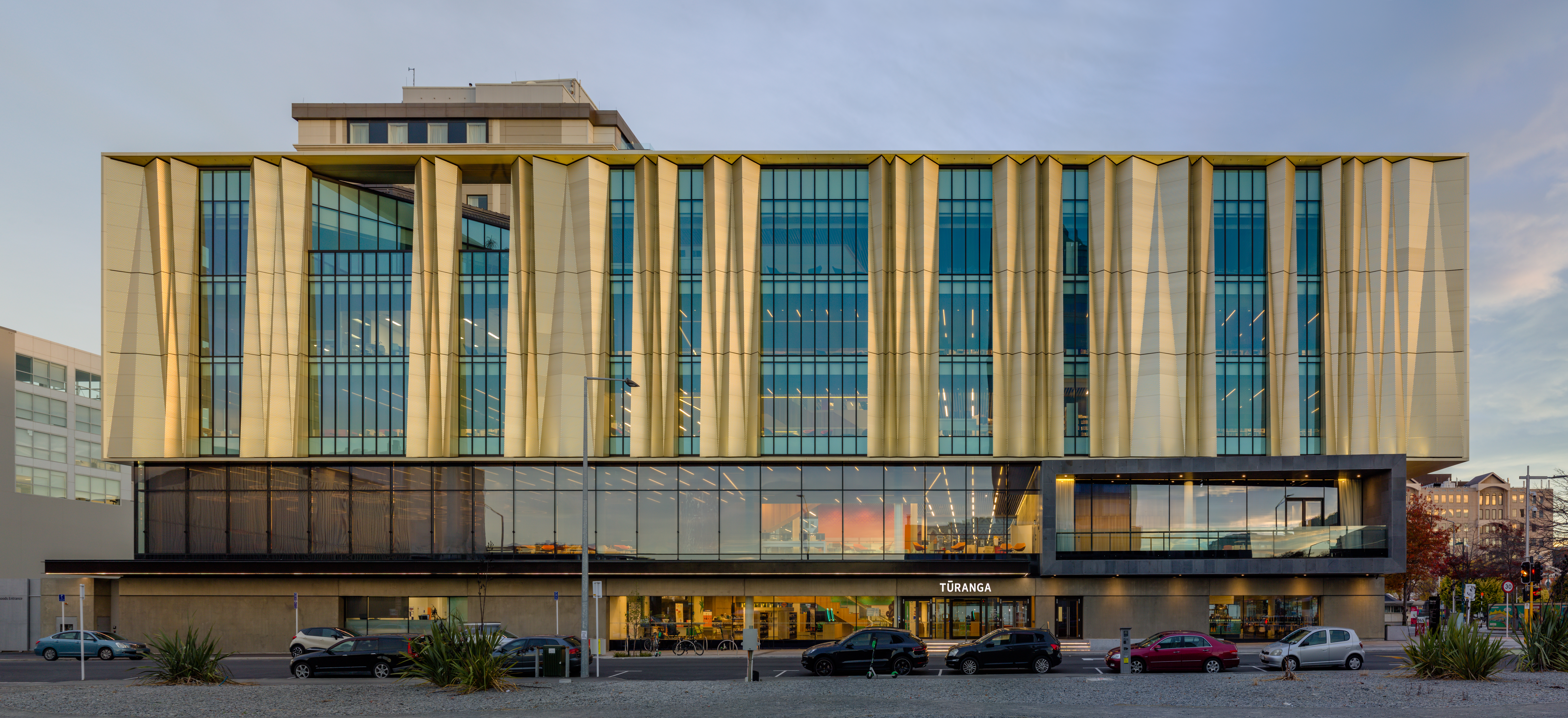
Central Library: Exterior of the central library known as Tūranga

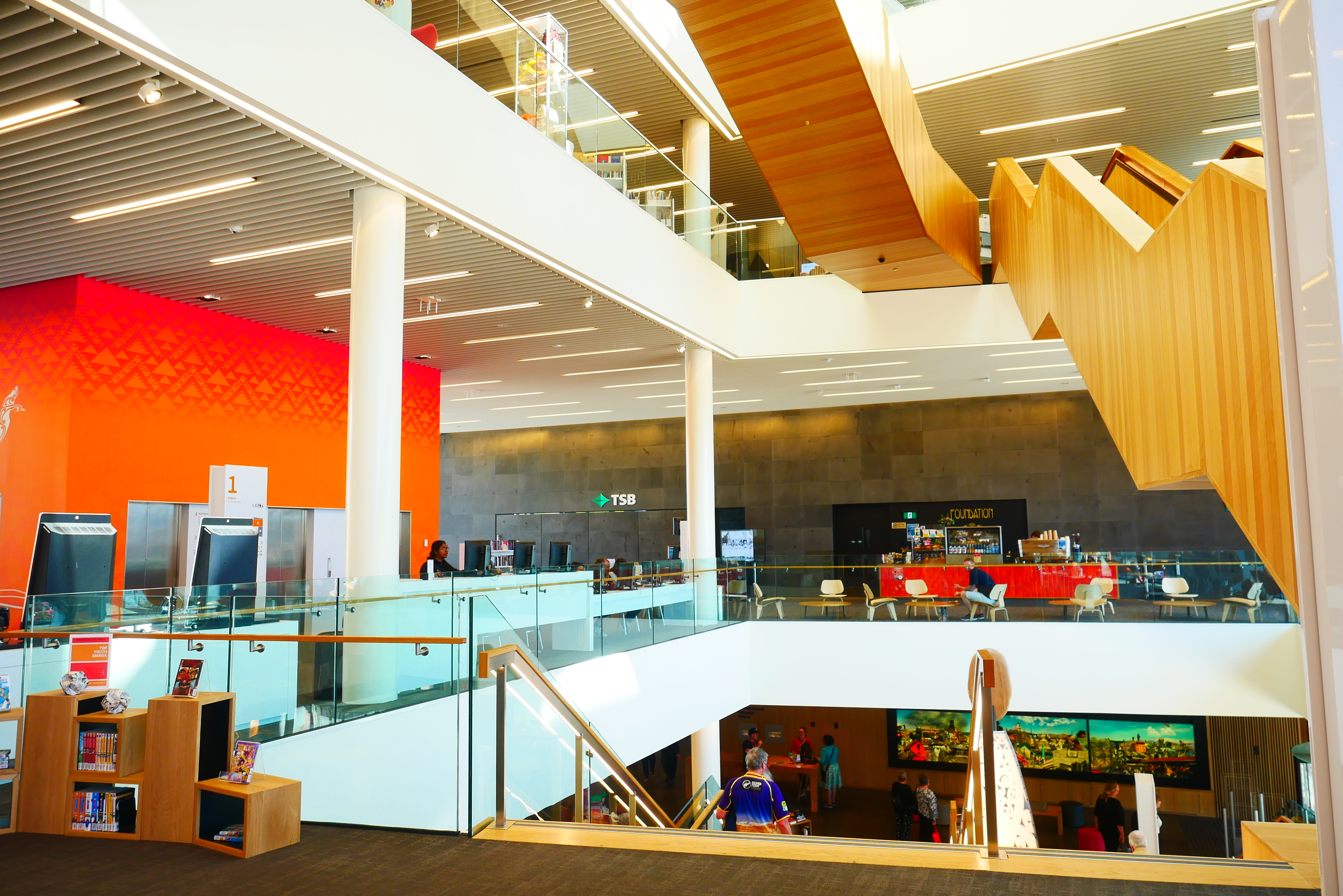
Central Library: interior view of Tūranga

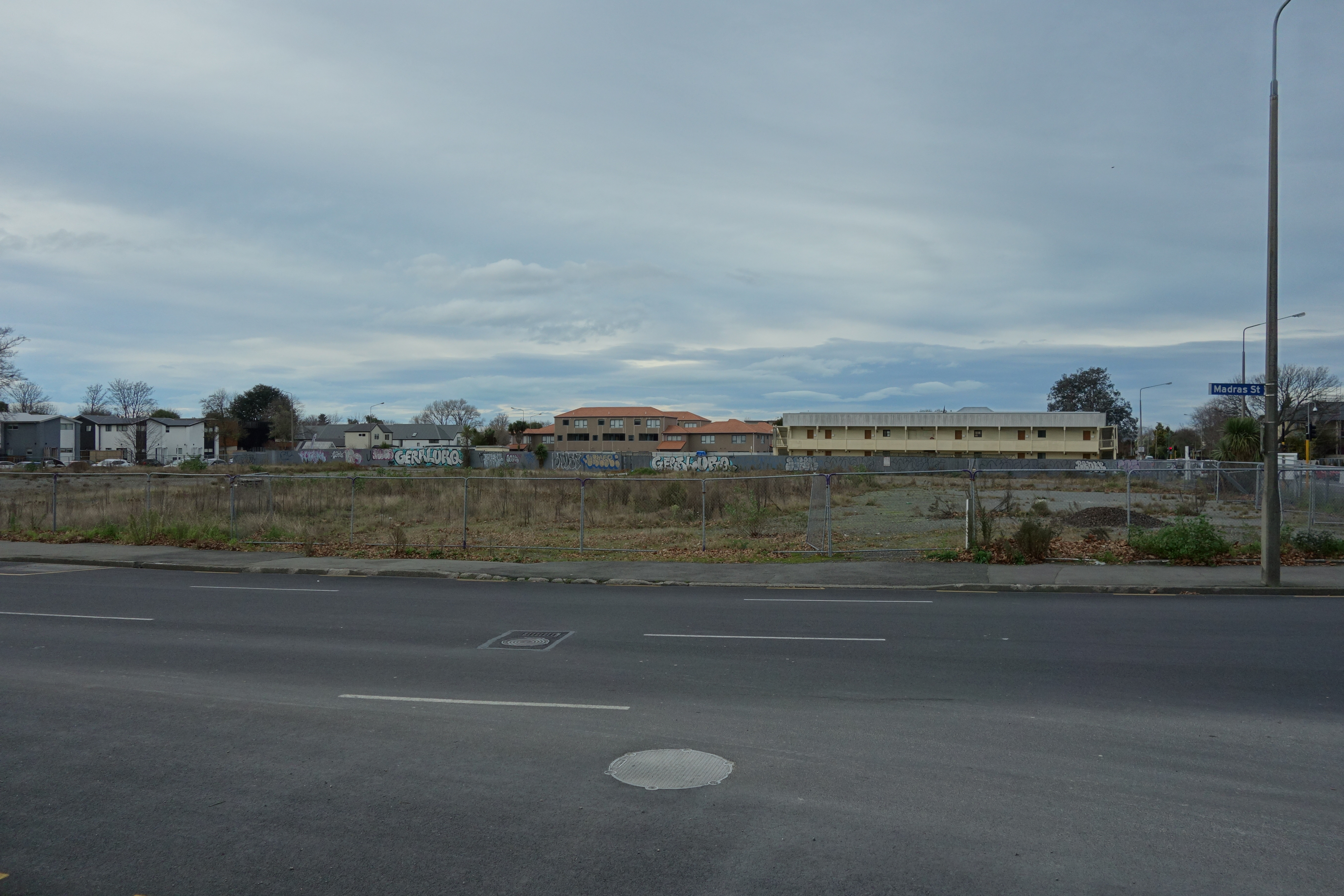
Residential Demonstration Project: bare land in July 2020

=== Metro Sports Facility ===
The Metro Sports Facility (Māori: Taiwhanga Rēhia) is proposed to be a large venue for aquatic sports, an indoor stadium, a high performance centre, recreation and performance space on a 70,000 square metres (750,000 sq ft) site. (Note: The Metro Sports Facility is shown as number 8 on the designation plan.) The project was to be delivered by Christchurch City Council, the private sector and non-governmental organisations. The delivery of this project has since been taken over by Ōtākaro Limited (an organisation owned by the Crown) and jointly funded by the city council and the Crown. After years of delays caused by cost overruns, construction started in August 2019. As of 2024, the facility is predicted to open in late 2025.

=== Stadium ===
The stadium (Māori: Taiwhanga Hākinakina) is proposed as a large multi-purpose indoor facility, covering most of three city blocks (the bordering roads are Madras Street, Hereford Street, Barbadoes Street, and Tuam Street). The stadium would thus occupy Cashel and Lichfield streets. (Note: The stadium is shown as number 7 on the designation plan.) The stadium is a joint initiative by Christchurch City Council and the Crown, with several other partners including the Ministry of Business, Innovation and Employment (MBIE). After many years of discussion, the city council confirmed a stadium investment case in December 2019 and cabinet approved its funding contribution in March 2020. It formally opened on 27 March 2026.

=== Cricket Oval ===
The cricket oval in Hagley Park (Note: No additional land was needed for this project; hence it is not shown on the designation plan.) (Māori: Papa Kirikiti) was to be enhanced so that it could host domestic and international tests. It was a joint project between CERA, the city council, and New Zealand Cricket. As any development within Hagley Park is controversial, the consent application was directly sent to the Environment Court, as any normal consent decision was expected to be appealed to the court anyway. The Environment Court approved the application in August 2013 and the new Hadlee Pavilion opened on 15 September 2014, in time for the 2015 Cricket World Cup; three games were played at the Hagley Oval. The redevelopment cost three times as much as the NZ$1.5m that had initially been approved by the city council. It was the first anchor project to be completed.

=== Bus Interchange ===
The Bus Interchange (Māori: Whakawhitinga Pahi) was proposed as an effective system for public transport, and as a replacement for the damaged Bus Exchange. The proposed Bus Interchange was to be located opposite the Bus Exchange, on the south side of Lichfield Street. (Note: The Bus Interchange is shown as number 5 on the designation plan.) The project was to be led by Environment Canterbury (the Canterbury Regional Council), Christchurch City Council, CERA, and the NZ Transport Agency. In the end, the Crown built the Bus Interchange and it opened on 25 May 2015. The cost to the Crown was NZ$53m and as part of the global settlement between the Crown and the city council, the building was transferred to the city council for $23m in October 2019.

=== Innovation Precinct ===
The aim of the Innovation Precinct (Māori: Te Puna Rerekētanga) was to encourage collaboration between innovative businesses and research organisations, thus improving productivity for Christchurch and New Zealand. The general location of the Innovation Precinct was the area around High Street, where the South Frame and the East Frame meet. (Note: The south-east corner of the Frame, envisaged for the Innovation Precinct, is shown as number 6 on the designation plan.) At the time of the Blueprint's release, the EPIC (Enterprise Precinct and Innovation Campus) project was already underway and proximity to the Christchurch Polytech (now known as Ara Institute of Canterbury) was seen as a benefit. The largest tech business that has moved into the area is Vodafone, which established its South Island headquarters in the InnoV8 building in 2016. Another building that houses a tech company is Orbica on Lichfield Street. As of 2020, about half of the land between Lichfield Street, Poplar Street, Tuam Street, and Manchester Street remains as gravel car parks.

Metro Sports Facility, Stadium
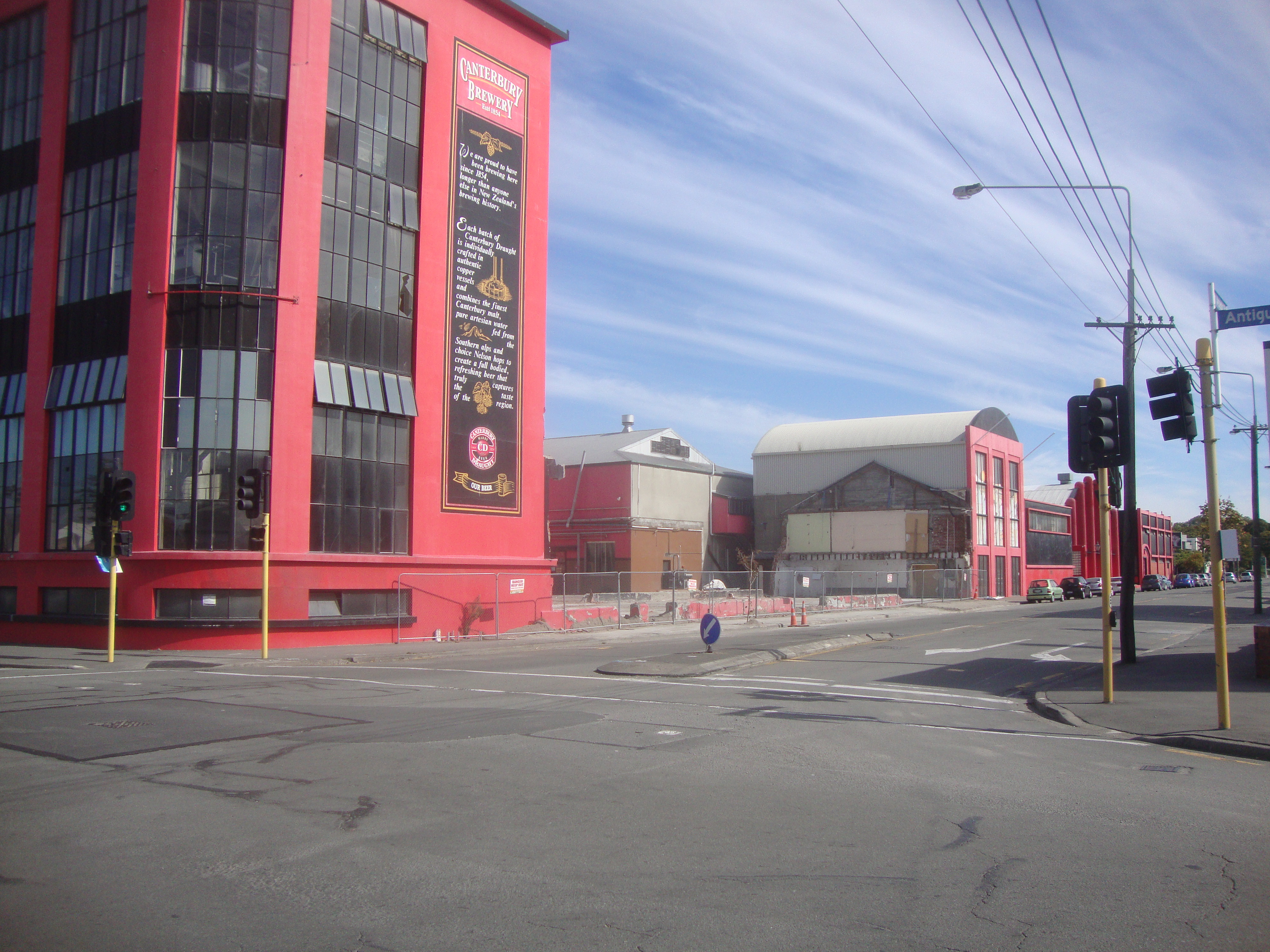
Metro Sports Facility: Canterbury Brewery was located on the northern end of the proposed Metro Sports Facility.

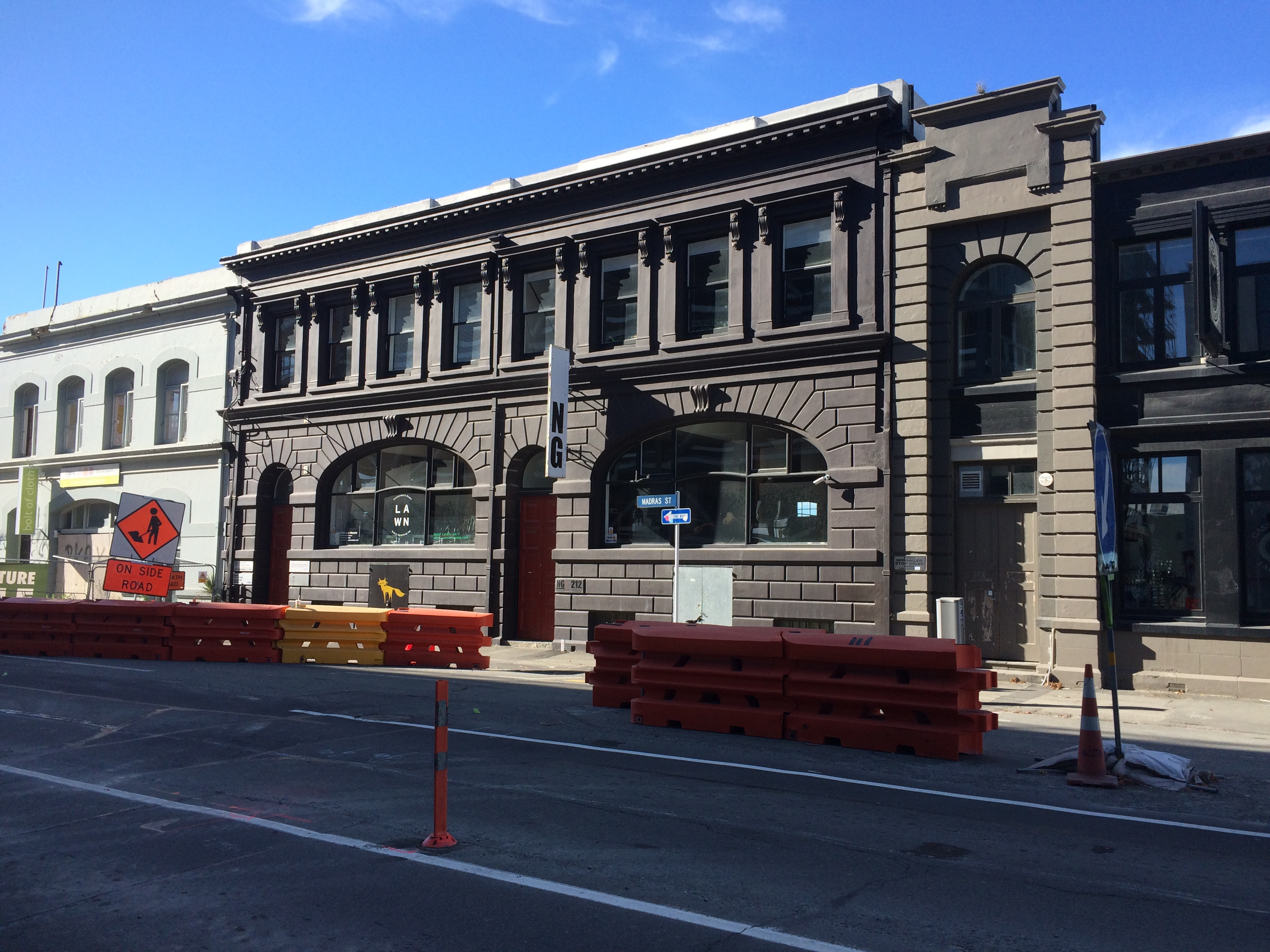
Stadium: The Bains Building (centre) is the last remaining building on the three city blocks that form the stadium site.

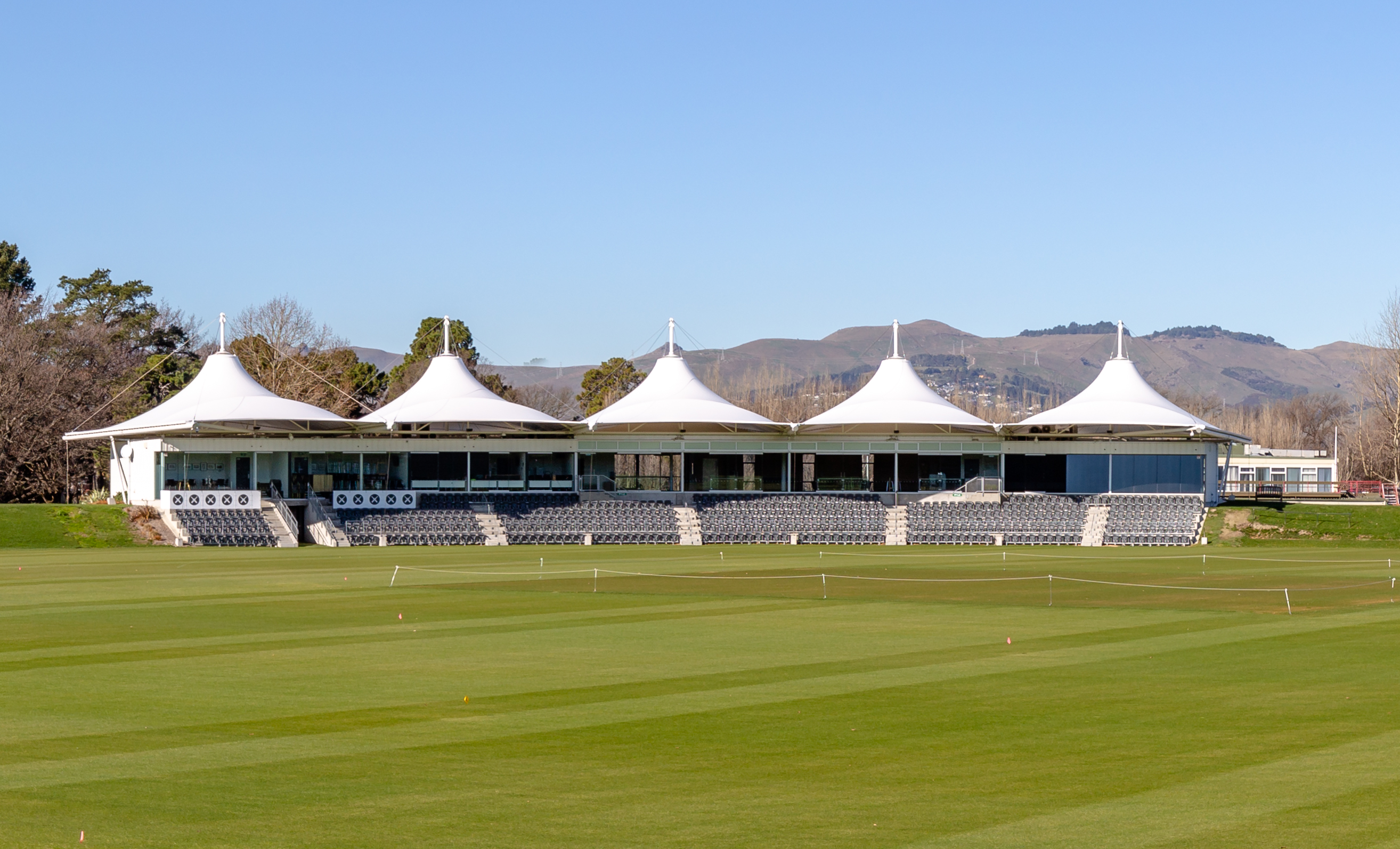
Cricket Oval: Pavilion at Hagley Oval

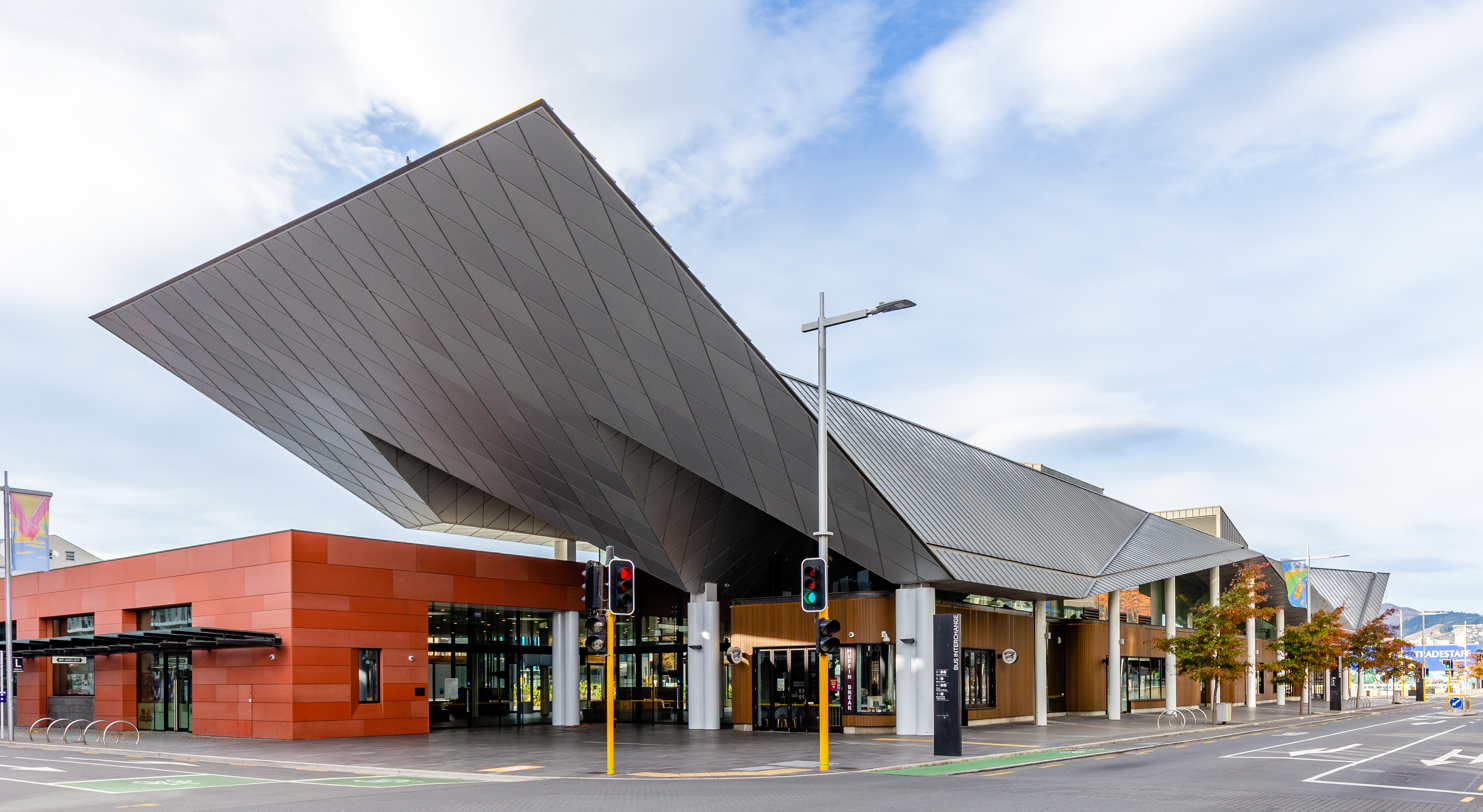
Bus Interchange: the building opened in 2015

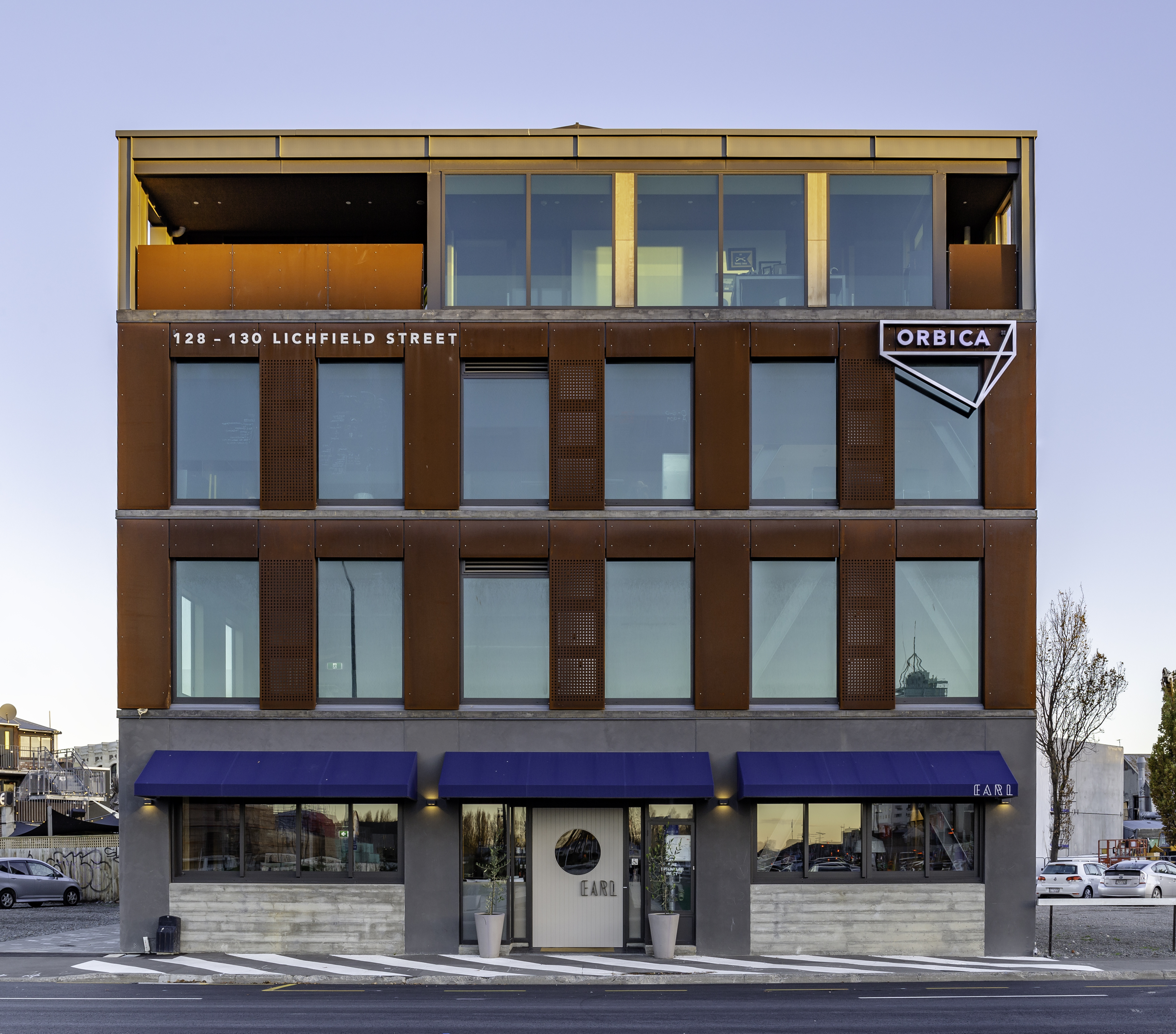
Innovation Precinct: the stylish Orbica Building is surrounded by a sea of gravel car parks.

== Timeline ==
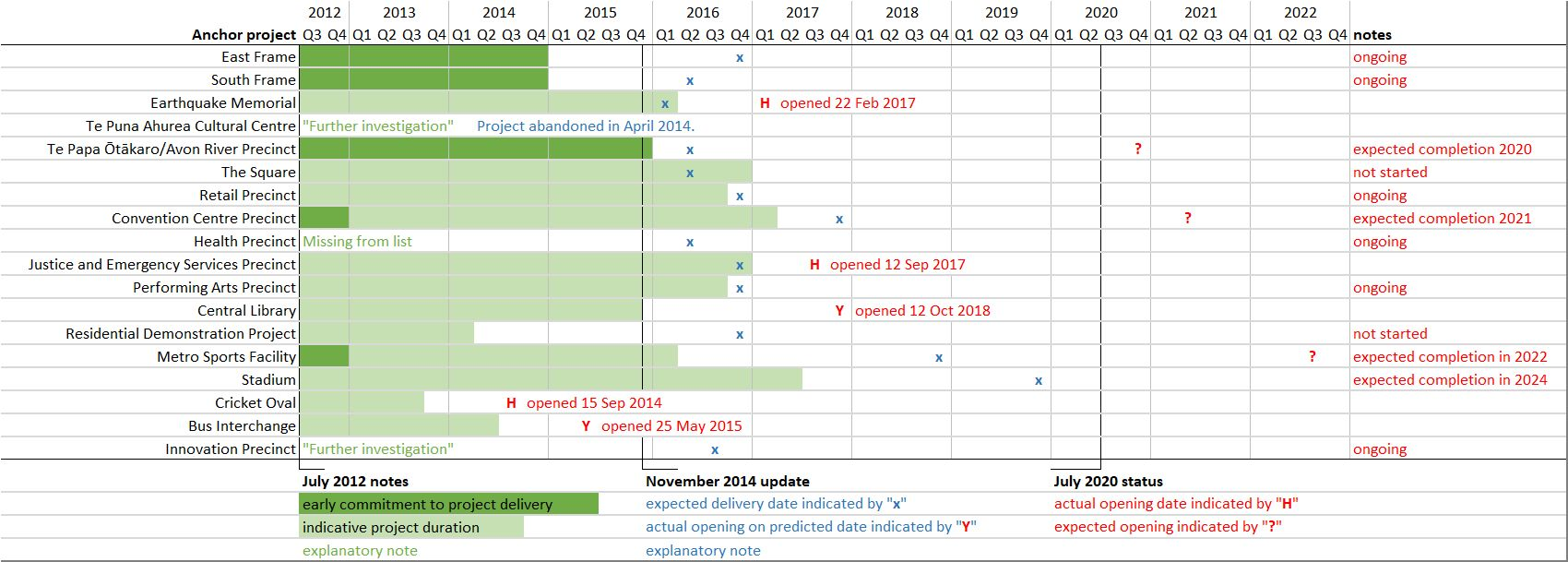
Anchor project timeline as of July 2020

The timeline graphic is based on the indicative project delivery schedule contained in the Blueprint published in July 2012, a pamphlet published in November 2014 plus the status as of July 2020. None of the projects were delivered as per the originally published indicative project delivery schedule. The first project to be completed was Hagley Oval (September 2014). The original schedule saw all projects where a delivery date had been specified completed by March 2017; at that point in time just three of the seventeen projects had been completed (the Bus Interchange was the second project (May 2015) to be finished, and the Earthquake Memorial the third project in February 2017). Ngāi Tahu abandoned its anchor project—Te Puna Ahurea Cultural Centre—in April 2014. As of July 2020, neither the Square, the Residential Demonstration Project, nor the stadium had been started, and only the stadium had a confirmed project status.

== Footnotes ==
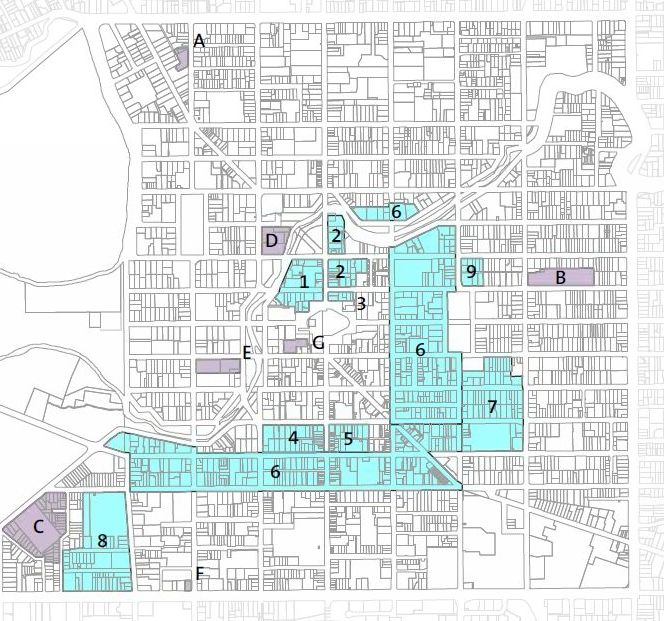
Land designated for the anchor projects is shown in blue
