= Christchurch Bus Interchange =

Bus station in Christchurch, New Zealand

Coordinates: 43.534539°S 172.637103°E

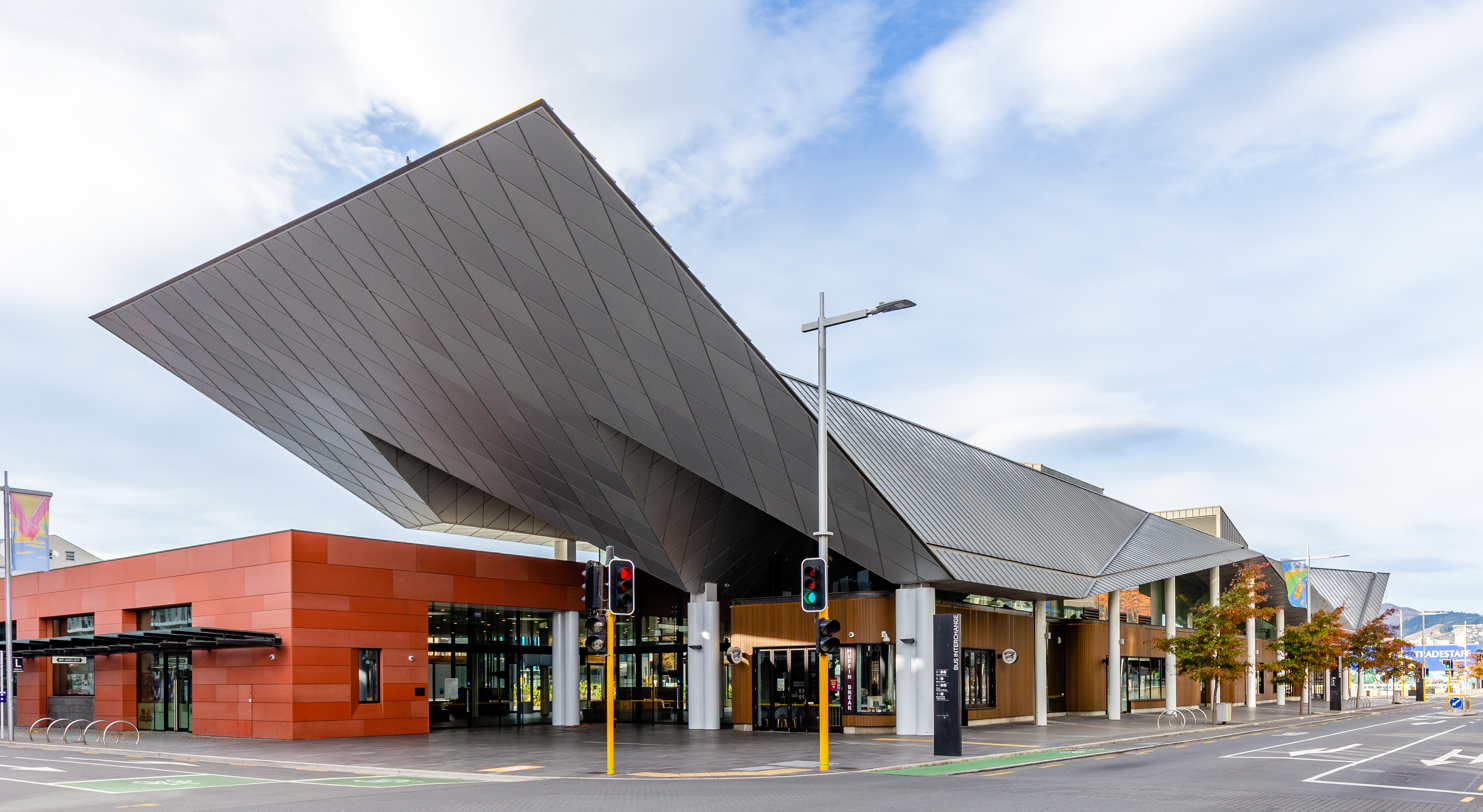
Bus Interchange in Christchurch, New Zealand

The Christchurch Bus Interchange is a bus station in the Christchurch Central City in New Zealand. Built as one of the 17 anchor projects identified in the Christchurch Central Recovery Plan, it opened in May 2015 after the previous Bus Exchange had been damaged in the 2011 Christchurch earthquake.

== History ==
Historically, Cathedral Square was the main facility for public transport users in central Christchurch. That changed when the Bus Exchange opened in November 2000 in Lichfield Street, with most bus routes using an indoor facility off Lichfield Street with direct pedestrian access in City Mall. The building that housed the Bus Exchange was damaged in the 2011 Christchurch earthquake and was later demolished. From October 2011, a temporary station—Central Station—was established in a block further west. This block was surrounded by Lichfield, Colombo, Tuam, and Durham streets, and the facility was expected to be in use for "up to two years".

The Bus Interchange was one of 17 anchor projects for the central city's earthquake recovery, outlined in the Christchurch Central Recovery Plan, published in July 2012. It set an indicative start date of 2012 and completion by June 2014. Christchurch City Council's District Plan was amended and two-thirds of the block surrounded by Lichfield, Manchester, Tuam, and Colombo streets designated for the Bus Interchange. The most significant building that had to be demolished to make way for the proposed Bus Interchange was Miller's Department Store, better known for its subsequent use from 1980 to 2010 as the head office of Christchurch City Council.

== Construction ==
Construction of the Bus Interchange started in July 2014, after the projected completion date for the building. The recovery plan identified ECan (Environment Canterbury, the regional council), CCC (Christchurch City Council), CERA (Canterbury Earthquake Recovery Authority), NZTA (NZ Transport Agency), and the private sector as project partners, but the project was carried out by CERA. Central Station was in use until 25 May 2015, when Christchurch's new $53 million Bus Interchange building opened, with half of the 16 bays operational. On 20 August, the building was physically completed and further opened to the public, including bike parking and more seating. On 8 October, the remaining bays opened. Later retailers took spaces.

Bus Interchange in Christchurch
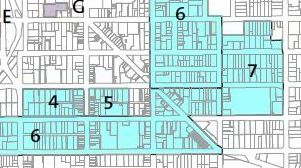
Christchurch District Plan recovery planning map showing designations in the southern part of the central city, with land for the Bus Interchange marked as number 5

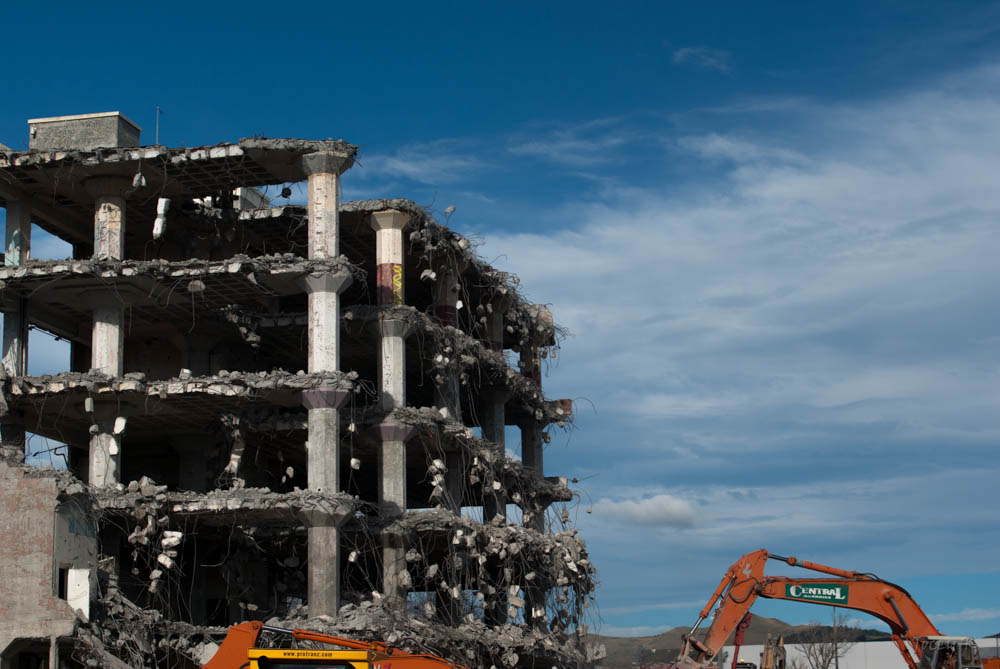
Demolition of the former civic offices in May 2014

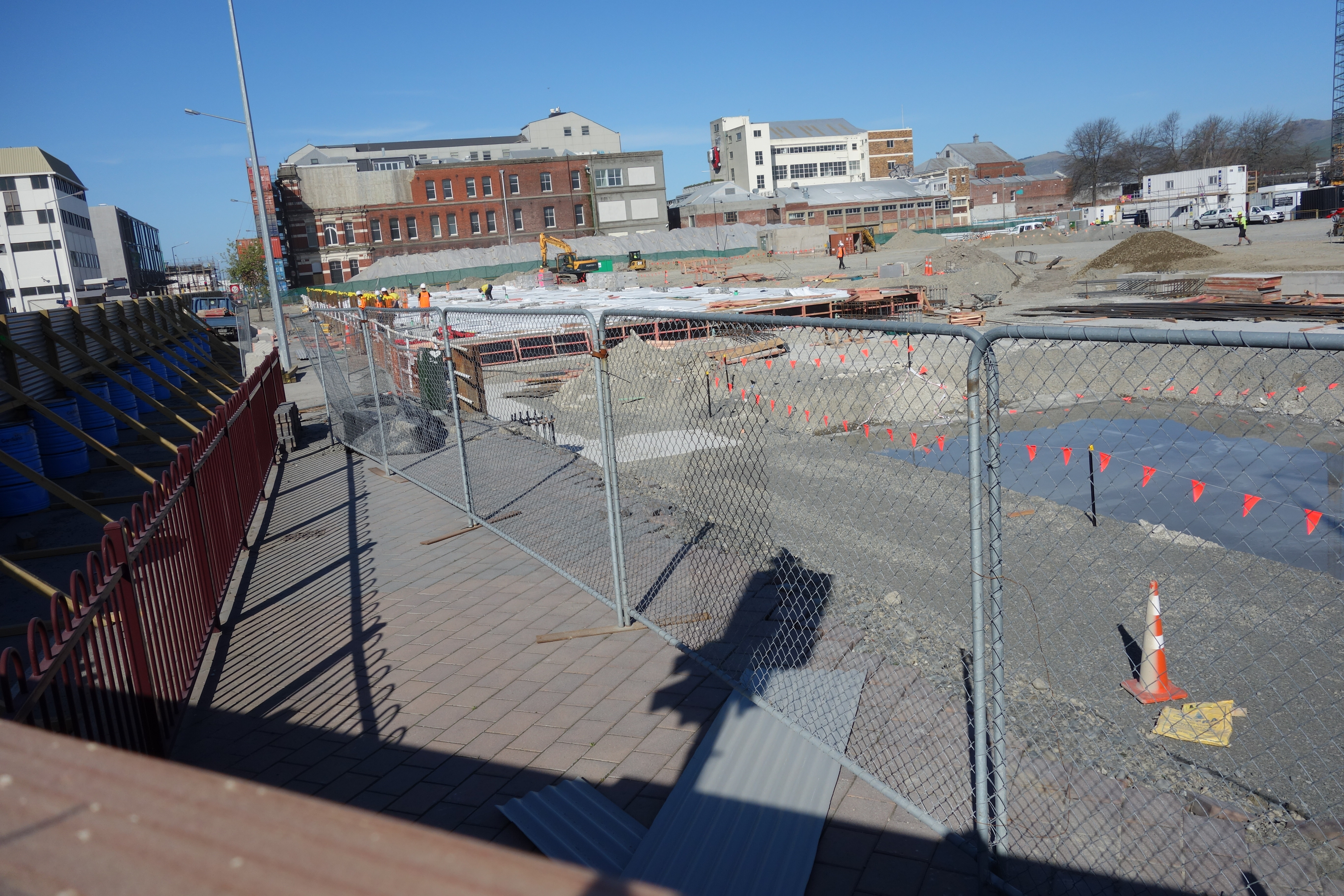
Work on the foundation in September 2014

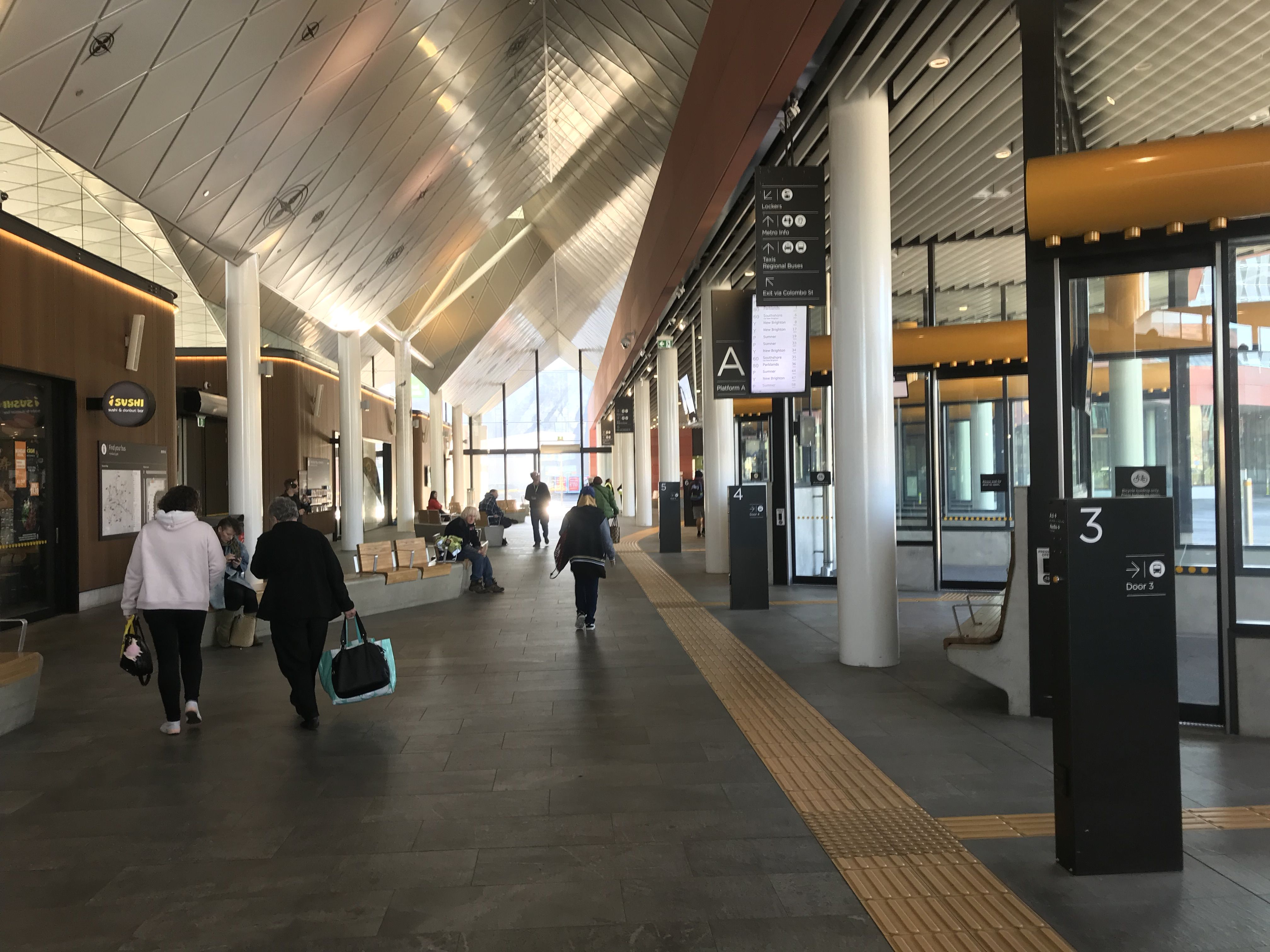
Interior
