= Walerjan Wrobel's Homesickness =

1991 film

- Directed by: Rolf Schübel
- Written by: Rolf Schübel
- Starring: Artur Pontek
- Cinematography: Rudolf Körösi
- Release date: July 1991
- Running time: 95 minutes
- Country: Germany
- Language: German

Walerjan Wrobel's Homesickness (German: Das Heimweh des Walerjan Wróbel) is a 1991 German drama film directed by Rolf Schübel. It was entered into the 17th Moscow International Film Festival where it won a Special Mention.

== Cast ==
- Artur Pontek as Walerian Wróbel
- Andrzej Mastalerz as Michal Piotrowski
- Michal Staszczak as Czeslaw
- Michael Gwisdek as Defense lawyer
- Peter Striebeck as Judge
- Ferdinand Dux as Knecht
- Kyra Mladeck as Bäuerin
- Claudia Schermutzki as Tochter
- Miroslawa Marcheluk as Mutter Wróbel
- Jakub Jablonski as Bruder
- Magda Marcinkowska as Schwester
