= Rolf Schübel =

German film director and screenwriter (born 1942)

- Born: 11 November 1942 (age 83); Stuttgart, Germany
- Occupations: Film director, screenwriter
- Years active: 1964–present

Rolf Schübel (born 11 November 1942 in Stuttgart, Germany) is a German film director and screenwriter.

Schübel studied literature and sociology during the 1960s, first in Tübingen, and later in Hamburg. There he met filmmaker Theo Gallehr and assisted at his documentary Landfriedensbruch (1967). However, the film was not shown in television but went directly to the film archives; the NDR (North German Broadcasting Studios) as employer refused to broadcast the film because it was viewed as too radical.

Nevertheless, Gallehr and Schübel produced a number of films for the NDR and WDR afterwards. For their documentary Der deutsche Kleinstädter (1968) they received the Adolf Grimme Award, as well as for Rote Fahnen sieht man besser (1971) concerning the closure of a chemical plant in Krefeld.

In 1972 Schübel founded his own production company. In the following years he created the film portraits Nachruf auf eine Bestie (1983) concerning the child murderer Jürgen Bartsch and Der Indianer (1987) about a man with laryngeal cancer. The film was based on the autobiographical tale of Leonhard Lenz. Both films received various awards.

His first feature film directed Schübel in 1990 with Das Heimweh des Walerjan Wróbel. The film tells the story of a Polish teenager under the regime of forced labor in Germany during World War II in northern Germany and who was later sentenced to death by the Nazi regime for a minor misdemeanor.

In 1992/93 Schübel made a two-part TV documentary about the battle of Stalingrad Todfeinde. Vom Sterben und Überleben in Stalingrad in which his Russian co-director Grigori Chukhrai as well as other Russian and German survivors told about their experiences during the battle. The film was a German-Russian co-production.

Schübel's international breakthrough came with the 1999 film Ein Lied von Liebe und Tod (Gloomy Sunday — A Song of Love and Death; it is set in Budapest of the 1930s and tells the story of a woman (Erika Marozsán) between three men (Joachim Król, Ben Becker and Stefano Dionisi). Background is the popular title melody, which was kind of an anthem for suicides during its time. The film won various awards among others the Deutscher Filmpreis, the Bayerischer Filmpreis (Best Feature Film), an honorable mention from the international 2000 Jerusalem Film Festival, the 2000 Audience Award at the São Paulo International Film Festival, and the Audience Choice Award at the St. Louis International Film Festival.

In 2001 he wrote and directed the psychodrama Collapse with Sebastian Koch as a journalist who questioned his job critically. In 2002 he directed the drama Blueprint with Franka Potente. In 2004 he made the drama Zeit der Wünsche. In 2006 and 2007 he made episodes for Tatort.

== Filmography ==
Year	Film	Awards
1967	Landfriedensbruch	
1968	Der Deutsche Kleinstädter	Adolf Grimme Award
1971	Rote Fahnen sieht man besser	German Film Critics Award (VdFk)
1983	Nachruf auf eine Bestie	German Film Critics Award (VdFk)
1987	Der Indianer	Interfilm Award, Deutscher Filmpreis (Silver), Leipzig DOK Festival (Special Jury Prize), Marseille Festival of Documentary Film (Grand Prix)
1990	Walerjan Wrobel's Homesickness	Entered into the 17th Moscow International Film Festival.
1999	Gloomy Sunday	Bayerischer Filmpreis (Best Cinematography, Best Direction), Guild of German Art House Cinemas (Guild Film Award — Gold), Satellite Award (Golden Satellite Award)
2001	Kollaps	
2002	Blueprint	
2005	Zeit der Wünsche (TV film)	
