= Blueprint (film) =

2003 film by Rolf Schübel

- Theatrical release poster
- Directed by: Rolf Schübel
- Written by: Claus Cornelius Fischer; Charlotte Kerner (novel)
- Produced by: Nikola Bock; Andrea Terres
- Starring: Franka Potente; Ulrich Thomsen; Hilmir Snær Guðnason
- Distributed by: United International Pictures
- Release date: 8 December 2003
- Running time: 108 minutes
- Country: Germany
- Language: German

Blueprint is a 2003 German drama film directed by Rolf Schübel. It is based on the 1999 novel by Charlotte Kerner. The film raises the ethical issue of human cloning.

== Plot ==
Iris Sellin (Potente) is a world-famous pianist and composer who finds out that she is suffering from multiple sclerosis, a degenerative nerve disorder that will gradually stop her being able to perform. She asks a friend, Dr. Martin Fischer (Thomsen), a revolutionary reproductive researcher, to assist her in creating her clone so that she can pass her music onto her daughter. Even though cloning of humans is illegal, Dr. Fischer agrees so that he will forever be known as the first. The procedure is a success and Iris gives birth to Siri (Potente). Siri closely resembles her mother in both facial features and musical talent.

When Siri finds out at the age of thirteen that she is her mother's clone, her whole world falls apart. The once very close and sweet relationship between mother and daughter turns into an emotional struggle. They fight for the same man, compete with their musical careers, and nearly pay with their lives.

In order to escape the disappointment of her own existence, Siri later moves to Canada where she starts a lonely life away from civilization in the woods photographing deer. But fate grants her the possibility of release from her self-imposed isolation when she meets Greg (Hilmir Snær Guðnason), a charming architect who brings love back into Siri's life and even paves the way toward reconciliation between mother and daughter.

== Cast ==
- Franka Potente as Iris Sellin / Siri Sellin (adult)
- Ulrich Thomsen as Dr. Martin Fisher
- Hilmir Snær Guðnason as Greg
- Katja Studt as Daniela Hausmann
- Justus von Dohnanyi as Thomas Weberja

== Soundtrack ==
The opening and the closing credits of the movie feature the song "The Truth Lies" by Dana Glover.
