= Blueprint (novel) =

1998 novel by Charlotte Kerner

- Cover
- Author: Charlotte Kerner
- Original title: Blaupause
- Language: German
- Genre: Science fiction
- Publisher: Beltz & Gelberg
- Publication date: 1998
- Publication place: Germany
- Pages: 185
- ISBN: 3407808372
- OCLC: 742586254

Blueprint: Blaupause is a German novel written by Charlotte Kerner and first published in 1998. The story involves a woman who clones herself in order to pass on her musical genius, only to find her clone-daughter turning against her when she learns the truth. It won the Deutscher Jugendliteraturpreis.

== Film, TV or theatrical adaptations ==
The novel was adapted to film as Blueprint in 2003.

== Publication ==
Beltz & Gelberg, 1999, ISBN 3-407-80837-2 (in German)
