= Christchurch Bus Exchange =

Bus station in Christchurch, New Zealand

Bus Exchange
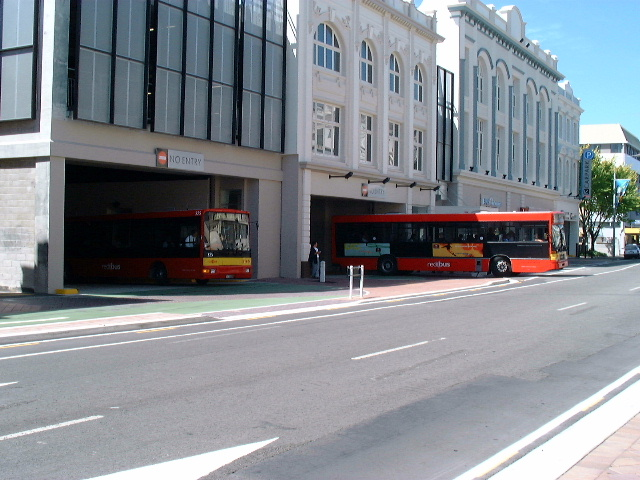
- The Lichfield Street frontage of the Bus Exchange

General information
- Location: corner Lichfield and Colombo Streets, Lichfield Street, Christchurch
- Inaugurated: 20 November 2000; 25 years ago
- Destroyed: 22 February 2011; 15 years ago
- Client: Carter Group Ltd
- Owner: Christchurch City Council (CCC)

Height
- Height: 15 m (49 ft)

Technical details
- Floor area: 9,500 square metres (102,000 sq ft)

Design and construction
- Architecture firm: Buchan Group; Christchurch City Council
- Main contractor: Mainzeal

The Bus Exchange was the main public transport facility in the central city of Christchurch, New Zealand. Part of it was indoor and featured airport-style lounges. The Bus Exchange opened in November 2000 and closed due to the February 2011 Christchurch earthquake, which damaged the building beyond repair. The replacement facility, the Bus Interchange, opened across the other side of Lichfield Street in May 2015.

== History ==
Previously, Cathedral Square was used as the central city terminus for buses, and all trams passed through it until the 1950s. Christchurch City Council (CCC) was looking for an alternative central city location when approached by the Carter Group in relation to a substantial development of a good portion of the block surrounded by Lichfield, Colombo and Cashel streets. Within weeks, CCC committed itself to the project. The public consultation process had an emphasis on informing, rather than seeking feedback, as the public transport part of the Carter Group's redevelopment was carried out during a late stage of the overall development. Retail spaces in the development were already being fitted out when agreement was reached to build the Bus Exchange. The Bus Exchange opened on 20 November 2000.

=== Bus network changes ===
As the Bus Exchange would not have the capacity of a terminus, where vehicles lay over for a length of time until their next run starts, an extensive restructuring of bus routes was required. Two techniques were used that allowed the Bus Exchange to be used as a normal bus stop:

- The terminus for a route ending in the central city was relocated to the edge of the central city, opposite to where the route came from. That greatly increased coverage of the central city, but also significantly increased bus volumes on central city streets. It also required the establishment of new termini, some of which near residential land use proved to be quite controversial.
- Where routes came from opposite ends of the city, they were combined to form through routes.

The former technique was the main one to be employed initially. Over time, routes have increasingly been through-routed as bus contracts came up for renewal.

== Layout ==
=== Bus stop infrastructure ===
The Bus Exchange was made up of two main components for buses:

- The off-street section – nine bus stops were located around the two indoor passenger lounges accessed from Lichfield Street
- The on-street section – an initial six (eight since 2009) bus stops were located on Colombo Street
- In addition, there is an outside bus stop on Lichfield Street that is used by the airport bus (route 29).
- There is also a pair of stops for The Shuttle on Colombo Street; those stops are in addition to those used by other buses.

The original layout had 15 bus stops (nine inside and six on Colombo Street). Initially, the stops for The Shuttle used to be physically separated from the Colombo Street stops; the Shuttle stops were north of Cashel Street, whilst the Bus Exchange stops were south of it. When the number of Bus Exchange stops on Colombo Street was increased from six to eight, the northbound Shuttle stop moved to south of Cashel Street and was then immediately adjacent to the other stops.

== 2011 earthquake ==
Following the 22 February 2011 Christchurch earthquake, the central city was closed off due to the heavy damage that it sustained. The Bus Exchange itself was also damaged beyond repair and in August 2011, it was added to the list of buildings to be demolished.
