= Red Bus (New Zealand) =

Bus operator in Christchurch, New Zealand

- Parent: Ritchies Transport
- Founded: 1991
- Ceased operation: December 2020
- Headquarters: Christchurch, New Zealand
- Locale: New Zealand
- Service area: Christchurch
- Service type: Bus services
- Fleet: 52 (December 2020)
- Annual ridership: 3.87 million (2017/18)
- Fuel type: Diesel; Electric
- Chief executive: N/A
- Website: www.redbus.co.nz

Red Bus was a bus operator in Christchurch, New Zealand. Red Bus operated public transport bus services around Christchurch on behalf of the Canterbury Regional Council, and it operated the free inner city Shuttle on behalf of the city council until the 2011 Christchurch earthquake.

On 4 November 2020 it was announced Ritchies Transport Holdings Limited had purchased the assets of Red Bus, with 63 job losses. The sale was completed on 7 December 2020.

== History ==
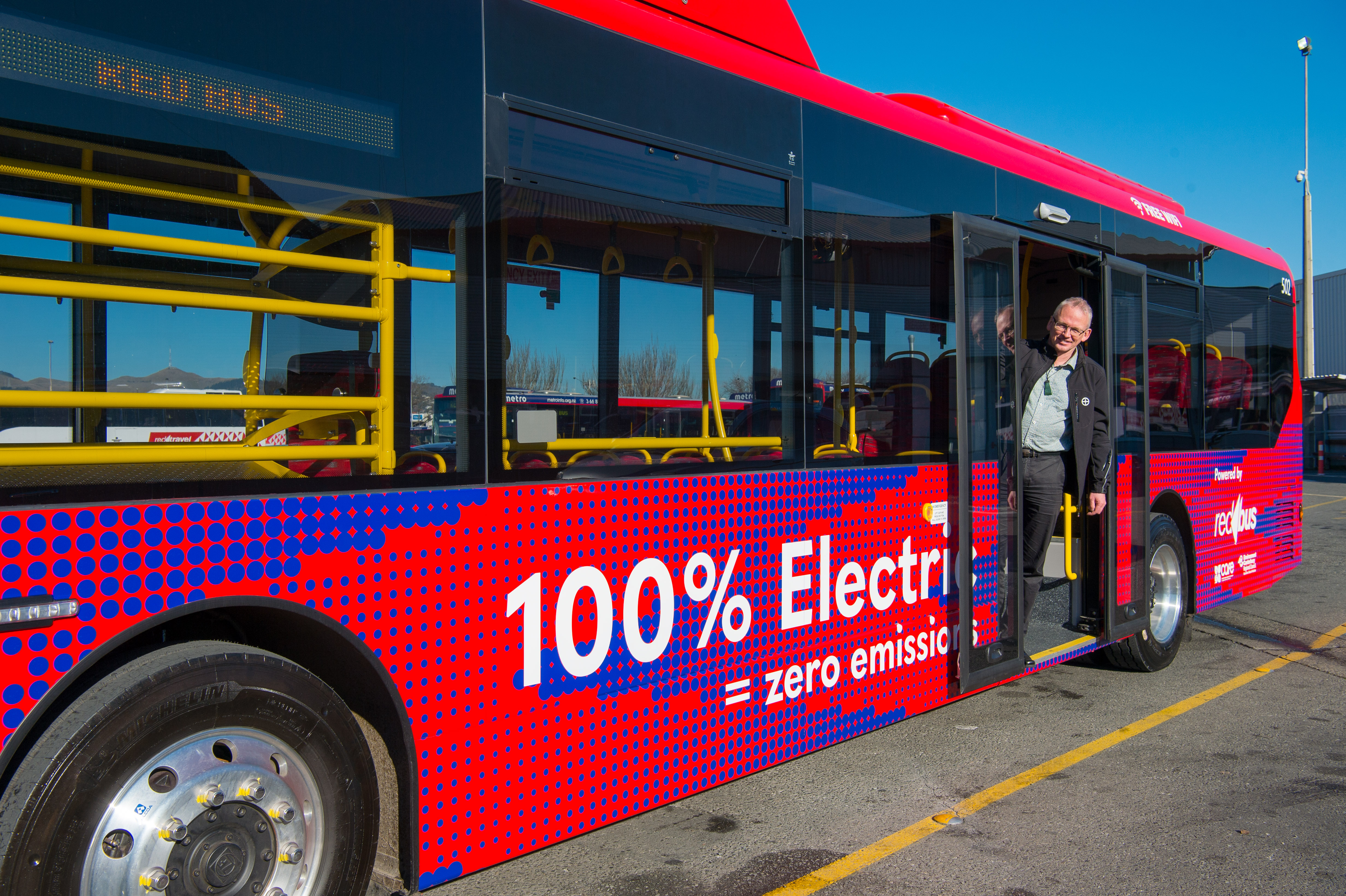
An electric Red Bus in Christchurch (2019).

Red Bus evolved from the Christchurch Transport Board which for several decades had run all urban bus services with its distinctive red buses. It was then owned by Christchurch City Holdings, a holding company of the Christchurch City Council. Red Bus operated the free central city bus, The Shuttle, on behalf of Christchurch City Council from 1998 to 2011. In November 2016 the business of Aaron Travel was purchased.

The company lost routes in the 2019 tender for Public Transport services conducted by the Canterbury Regional Council (ECAN), the agency that runs public transport in Christchurch – reducing it to running just 20 per cent of the urban network.

In June 2019 three Alexander Dennis Enviro200 bodied BYD K9 electric buses were introduced. In December 2014, a charter division commenced under the Red Travel brand. Red Travel was closed down in May 2020 as a result of the actual and forecast reduction in demand due to Covid-19.

On 7 May 2020, the Christchurch City Council held a public-excluded meeting to discuss the future of the company. On 8 May 2020, former City Councillor Deon Swiggs revealed that the Council gave approval for Christchurch City Holdings to explore selling the Red Bus business. Red Bus CEO Paul McNoe resigned as CEO of Red Bus effective immediately on 8 May 2020. The company lost routes in the 2019 tender for public transport services conducted by the Canterbury Regional Council, the agency that runs public transport in Christchurch.

On 4 November 2020, it was announced Ritchies Transport Holdings Limited had purchased the assets of Red Bus.

== Fleet ==
As at August 2018, Red Bus operated 151 vehicles, predominantly Designline bodied MANs. This dropped to 52 vehicles in December 2020.
