= Christchurch Central City =

Central area of Christchurch, New Zealand

- Suburb
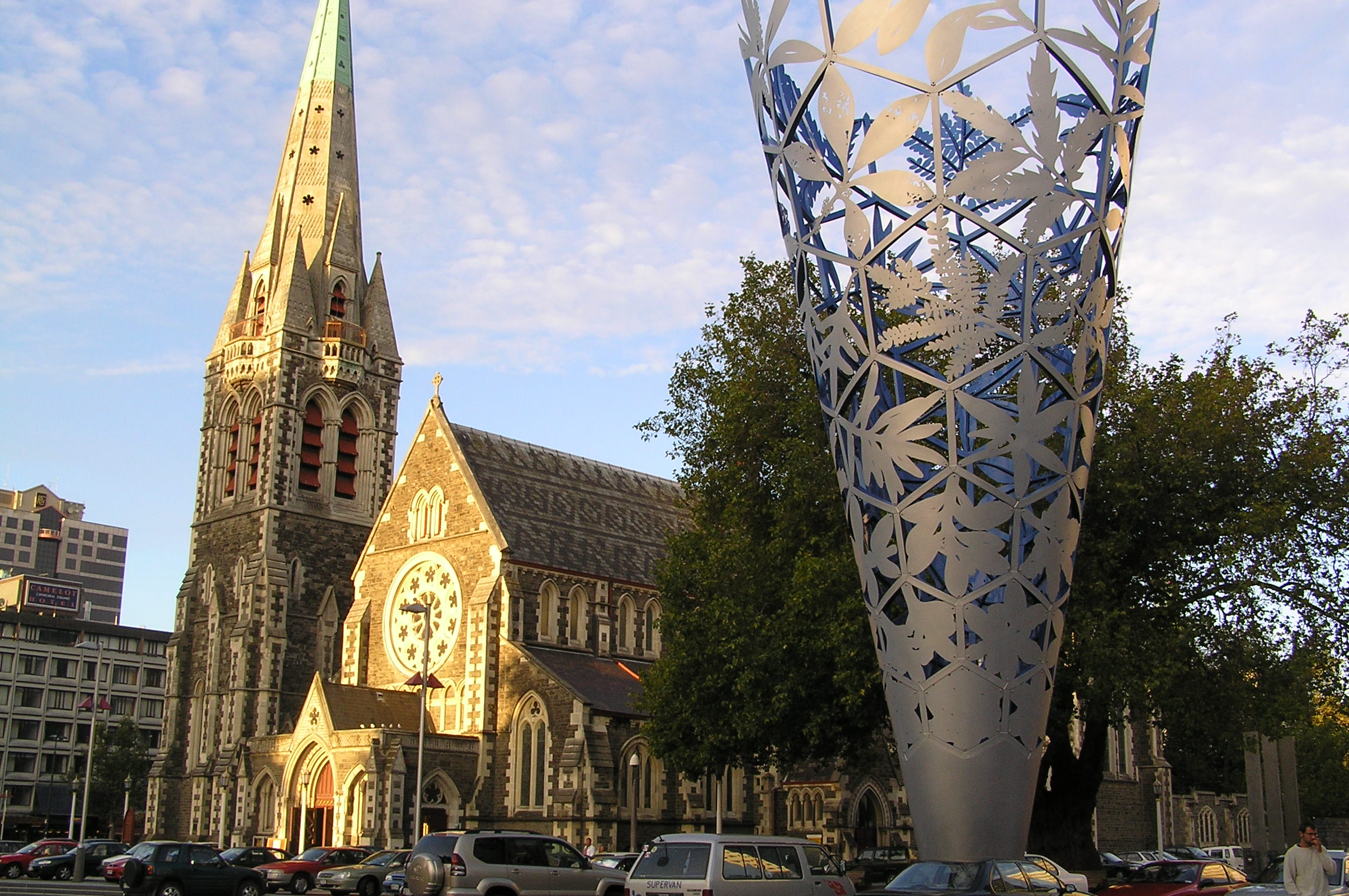
- Cathedral Square (2005) – the heart of the central city. The Cathedral suffered heavy damage in the 2011 earthquake, with its tower and part of the main building collapsing. It was announced in September 2017 that the building would be reinstated.
- Interactive map of Christchurch Central City
- Coordinates: 43.531°S 172.6365°E
- Country: New Zealand
- City: Christchurch
- Local authority: Christchurch City Council
- Electoral ward: Central
- Community board: Waipapa Papanui-Innes-Central
- Established: 1850

Area
  - Land: 634 ha (1,570 acres)

Population (June 2025)
  - Total: 9,180
  - Density: 1,450/km^{2} (3,750/sq mi)
- Hospitals: Christchurch Hospital

| Fendalton | St Albans | Richmond |
| Riccarton | Christchurch Central City | Linwood |
| Addington | Sydenham | Phillipstown |

Christchurch Central City or Christchurch City Centre is the geographical centre and the heart of Christchurch, New Zealand. It is defined as the area within the Four Avenues (Bealey Avenue, Fitzgerald Avenue, Moorhouse Avenue and Deans Avenue) and thus includes the densely built up central city, some less dense surrounding areas of residential, educational and industrial usage, and green space including Hagley Park, the Christchurch Botanic Gardens and the Barbadoes Street Cemetery.

It suffered heavy damage in the September 2010 Canterbury earthquake and was devastated five months later, in the February 2011 Christchurch earthquake. Following this second earthquake, the Central City Red Zone was set up and, with a gradually shrinking area, remained inaccessible except to authorised contractors until June 2013. However, proposals to relocate the city centre elsewhere, to avoid future damage, were considered both uneconomical (as much of the infrastructure was still mainly intact) and unnecessary, as the rebuilt city centre would be to modern building standards so as to be able to withstand similar quakes and the associated liquefaction in the future.

== Geography ==
Christchurch Central City is built on land that has been formed by gravel and other sediment within the last 7,000 years or thereabouts.

At the centre of the city is Cathedral Square, surrounding the Anglican cathedral, Christ Church. The area around this square and within the four avenues of Christchurch is considered the central business district of the city.

The city centre is laid out in a grid pattern, interrupted only by the curvilinear alignment of the Avon River / Ōtākaro, and the two diagonals High Street and Victoria Street. Christchurch has four pairs of one-way streets. The grid pattern within the outermost one-way streets is very regular, as this is the area that was laid out in the original survey. The surrounding area, i.e. the belt between the outer one-way streets and the avenues, was developed later in a progressive fashion and does not have the regularity of the core area.

Like most of the city, the centre is relatively flat. Before the earthquakes, Christchurch was home to many high rise buildings, but many of these were demolished following the 2011 Christchurch earthquake. Tall buildings left include Pacific Tower and Forsyth Barr Building, which dominate the skyline and can be seen throughout the city.

== History ==
=== Prehistory ===
Māori were the first occupants on the area covering modern-day Christchurch. There were permanent or semi-permanent settlements on the margins of the estuary (notably at the mouth of the Otakaro/Avon) and on the first areas of higher, drier ground up the Avon and Heathcote Rivers. There were two kāinga on the site of Central Christchurch: Puāri near Victoria Square, an important food-gathering place for Māori and Tautahi Pā, located further east of the Puāri kāinga.

=== European settlement ===
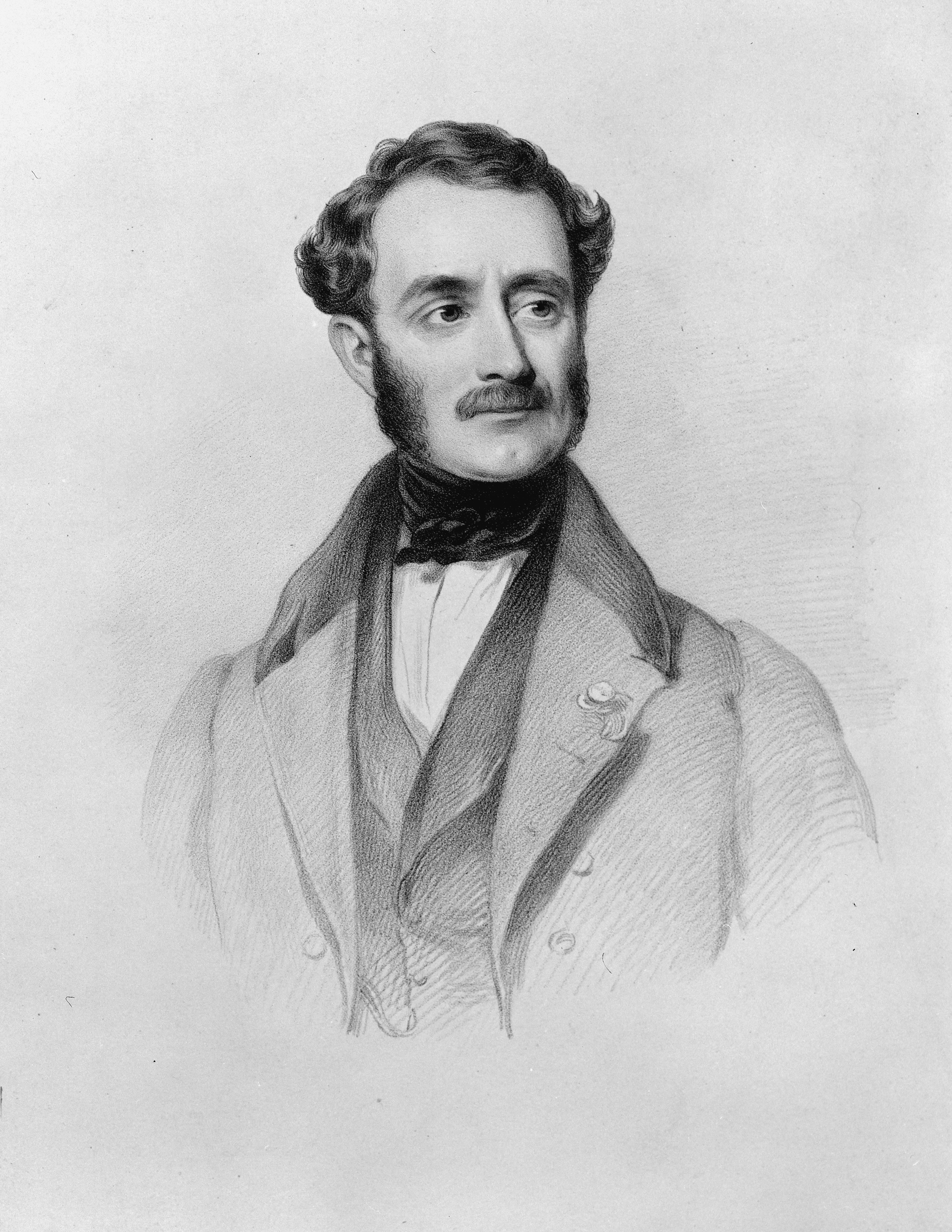
1840 portrait of Captain Joseph Thomas, who oversaw the surveys of Lyttelton, Sumner and Christchurch

The European settlement of Christchurch was undertaken by the Canterbury Association, which was founded in London in 1848. That year, the Canterbury Association sent out Captain Joseph Thomas, accompanied by surveyors, to select and prepare a site for settlement. Thomas originally placed the principal town of the proposed settlement at the head of Lyttelton Harbour / Whakaraupō, but when he realised there was insufficient flat land there to meet the Canterbury Association's requirements, he relocated Christchurch to where he had previously placed a town called 'Stratford' at a point on the Avon where those coming up the river first encountered slightly higher, drier ground. Back then, the Avon River / Ōtākaro was navigable as far as 'The Bricks' just upstream of the Barbadoes Street bridge. The site is these days marked by a riverbank cairn. The site got its name when the Deans Brothers in the 1840s had shipped bricks for their Riccarton homestead, located further up the river, which they unloaded in this location.

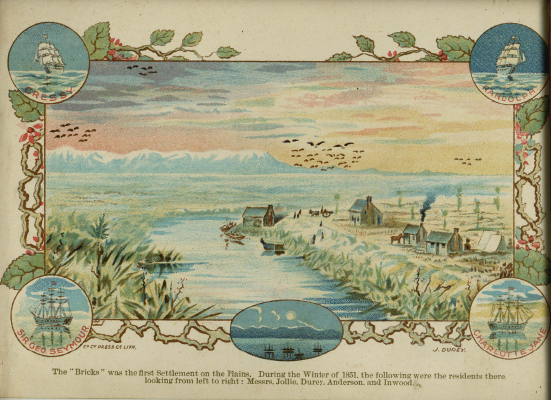
The Bricks on the southern bank of the Avon River / Ōtākaro. One of the huts is believed to have belonged to Joseph Thomas. The inserts show the First Four Ships that landed the colonists in 1850. Painted by John Dury in 1851.

=== Survey layout ===
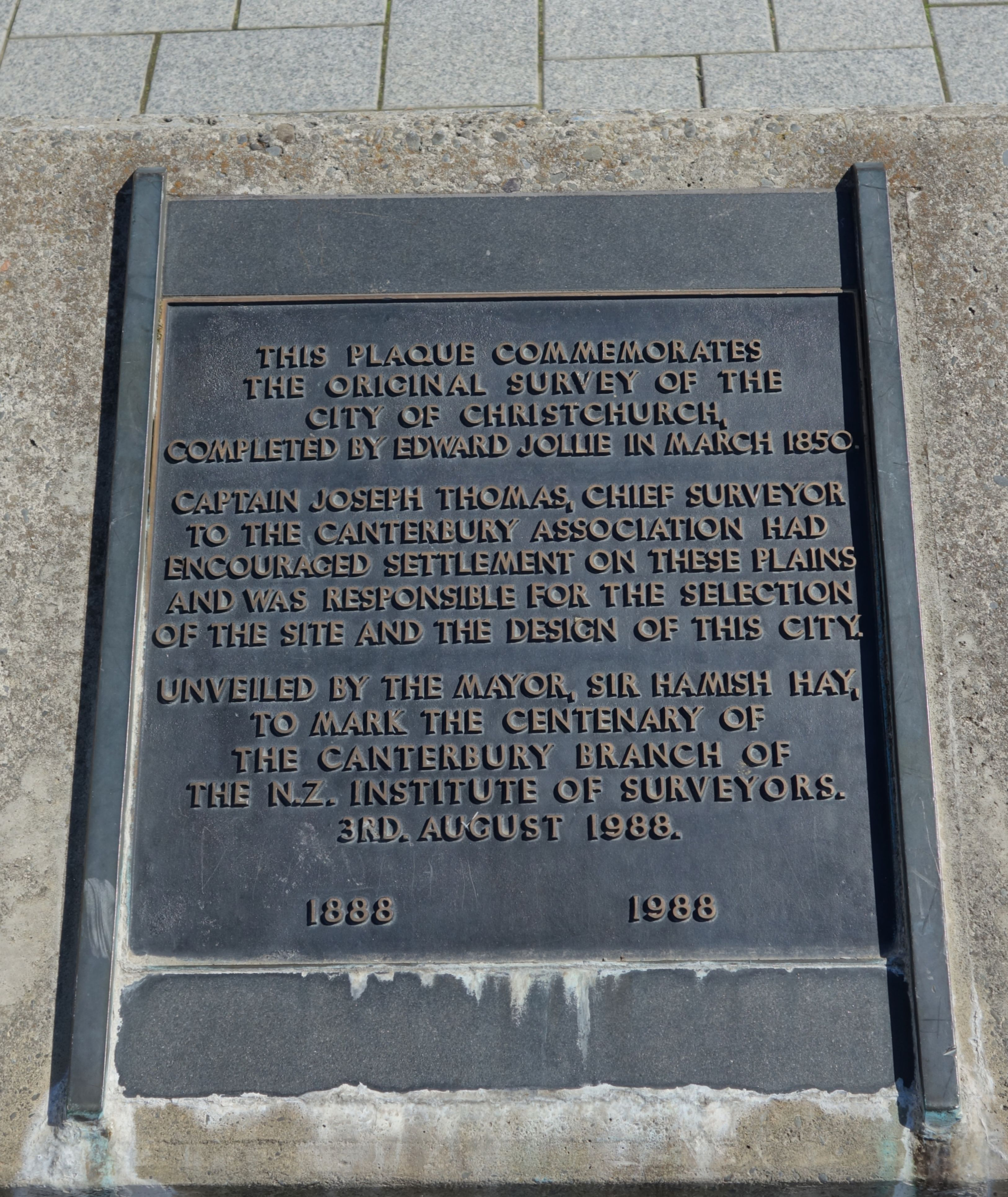
Plaque in Cathedral Square commemorating the Christchurch survey

Christchurch is one of a group of only four cities in the world that have been carefully planned following the same layout of a central city square, four complementing city squares surrounding it and a parklands area that embrace the city centre. The first city built with this pattern was Philadelphia, later came Savannah and Adelaide. The fourth city using this pattern was Christchurch. As such Christchurch holds an important legacy and a strong platform for future development.

Thomas' plan for Christchurch (laid out by the surveyor Edward Jollie by March 1850) was the 'standard' rectangular grid of colonial settlement (adopted for ease of survey and to facilitate land sales). Thomas did not allow Jollie to include crescents to provide variety, but the Avon River / Ōtākaro ran eccentrically across the site. Two diagonal streets (High Street/Ferry Road leading to Ferrymead, Heathcote and Sumner and Victoria Street/Papanui Road leading to the Papanui Bush) also broke the regularity of the grid. At the very centre of the city was a 'Square' (which is actually cross-shaped) intended as a grand centre for the city and the site of the proposed cathedral and grammar school. East and north-west of the Square were two more 'squares' (Latimer and Cranmer Squares, which are actually rectangles) which were placed more or less regularly in relation to the diagonal line of Ōtākaro running in a north-easterly direction across the city to the west and north of the central square.

The grid was laid out originally between Salisbury Street to the north and St Asaph Street to the south and between Barbadoes Street to the east and Rolleston Avenue/Park Terrace to the west. Between Salisbury, Barbadoes and St Asaph Streets and (respectively) the North, East and South Town Belts (these days called Bealey, Fitzgerald and Moorhouse Avenues) were 'town reserves', i.e. land with-held from immediate sale, which was sold off by the Provincial Government later in the 1850s to overcome cash flow problems. The streets of the original grid were mostly projected out to the Town Belts, but the street system is less systematic in the former 'town reserves'. The names chosen for the streets of the inner city almost all commemorate the English colonial origins of the settlement. The names chosen later for the town belts commemorate important personalities of early Christchurch. Jollie explains in his diary how the streets got their names:

The names of the streets of the three towns I surveyed were taken from Bishoprics and the way it was done was this; as soon as I completed the map I took it to Thomas who putting on his gold spectacles and opening his would read out a Bishop's name to hear if it sounded well. If I agreed with him that it did, I put the name to one of the streets requiring baptism. Lyttelton being the first born town got the best names for its streets, Sumner being next had the next best and Christchurch being the youngest had to be content with chiefly Irish and Colonial bishoprics as names for its streets. This accounts for, what to anyone not knowing the circumstances, appears strange, viz: that many of the best English Bishoprics are not represented while Irish and Colonial ones are. Sumner in fact died too late for the names there used to be again employed in Christchurch.

The original plan from 1850 shows the north-west corner of the 'town reserves' (surrounded by the Avon River / Ōtākaro, Fitzgerald and Bealey Avenues and Barbadoes Street, with an additional small rectangular area to the west of Barbadoes Street) as the cemetery for the settlement. Individual town sections were shown on the survey plan, the Black Map, and numbered by the surveyors in a logical order, in contrast to the rural sections surrounding Christchurch, which were numbered at the time of and in the order of their purchase.

The following streets were those laid out in the 1850 survey (listed east to west, then north to south, then diagonals). Where a street name is one of the original names as devised by surveyors Joseph Thomas and Edward Jollie, this is marked as such.

==== Streets running north–south ====
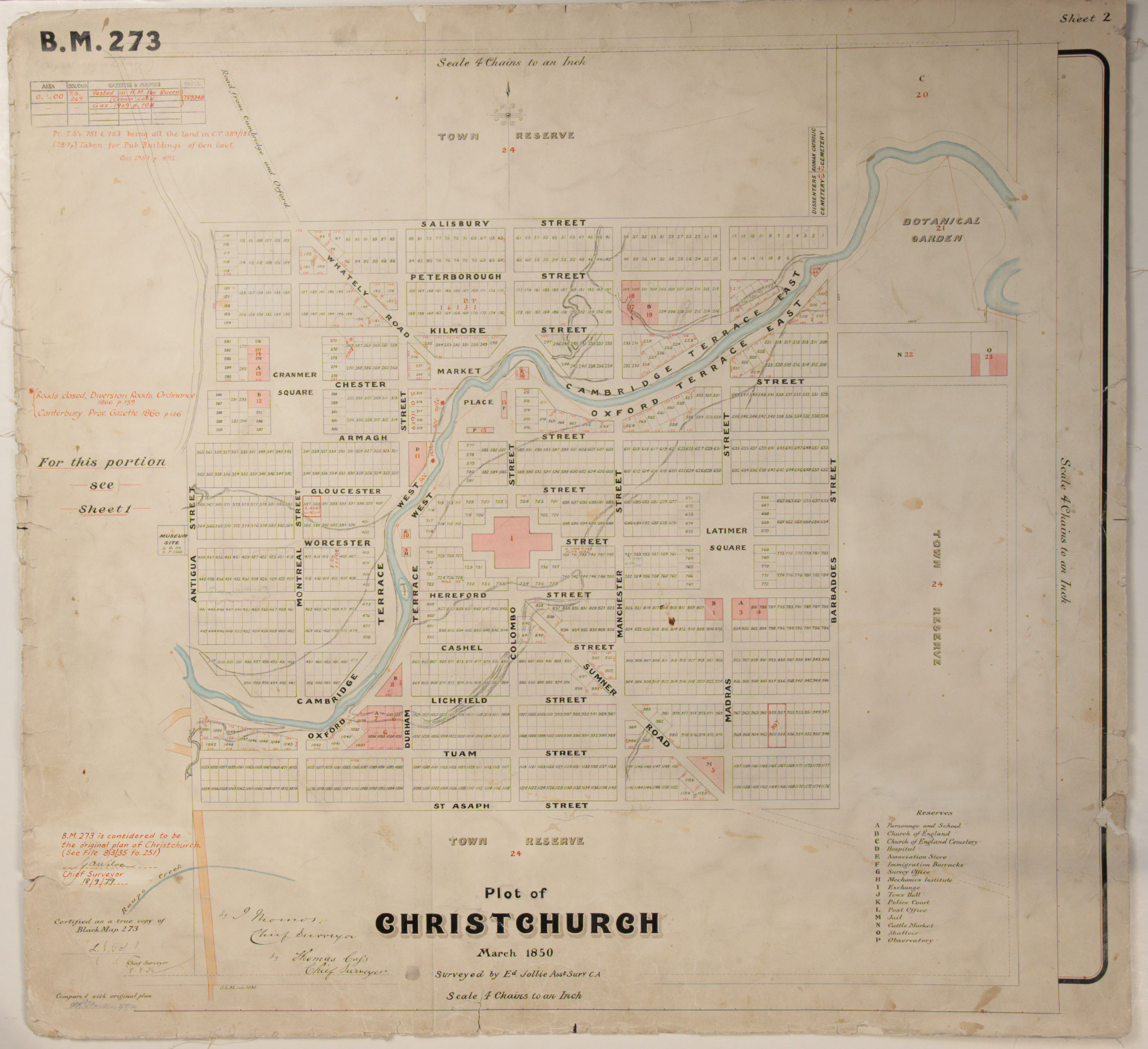
Christchurch Black Map from March 1850

- Deans Avenue – the original name for this street was West Belt. In 1905, it got renamed to Rolleston Avenue, but was called West Belt again in 1906. Deans Avenue is named after the Deans family, who farmed at Riccarton from 1843 onwards.
- Harper Avenue – this street was formerly called Park Road and North Park Road. It was so named because it runs alongside Hagley Park. It was renamed Harper Avenue by city council resolution on 18 May 1931 in honour of the retiring chairman of the Christchurch Domains Board George Harper (1843–1937).
- Rolleston Avenue – this street formerly belonged to Antigua Street. The section between Cambridge Terrace and Armagh Street was renamed in honour of William Rolleston on 11 January 1903, about one month before his death. This street was chosen because of his association with Canterbury College (now the Christchurch Arts Centre, which adjoined Antigua Street and also because it was proposed to erect his statue there.
- Park Terrace – this street appears as Mill Road on an 1862 map. Park Terrace, named because it runs adjacent to Hagley Park, first appears in street directories in 1880.
- Cranmer Square (original street name) – Cranmer Square is adjacent to the square of the same name and is named after the martyred Oxford bishop Thomas Cranmer.
- Montreal Street (original street name) – this street is named after the Anglican Diocese of Montreal in Canada. The surveyors ran out of English bishoprics to use as street names so moved on to other colonies.
- Durham Street (original street name) – the street was named after the Diocese of Durham. On 21 October 1985 the council resolved for the two separate sections of Durham Street (between Gloucester Street and Cashel Street, which is part of Cambridge Terrace) to be renamed Durham Street North and South.
- Colombo Street (original street name) – this street is named after the colonial Anglican bishopric Colombo in what at the time was known as Ceylon.
- Manchester Street (original street name) – this street is named after William Montagu, 7th Duke of Manchester, who was a member of the Canterbury association in 1848.
- Latimer Square (original street name) – the street adjacent to Latimer Square is named after the martyred Oxford bishop Hugh Latimer.
- Madras Street (original street name) – this street is named after the colonial Anglican bishopric of Madras (now known as Chennai) in India.
- Barbadoes Street (original street name) – this street is named after the Anglican colonial Diocese of Barbados in the West Indies, now known as the Caribbean. The Christchurch spelling of Barbados with an additional 'e' is as per the original survey plan drawn by Edward Jollie.
- Fitzgerald Avenue – the original names for this street were East Town Belt and East Belt. The street was renamed by council on 11 January 1904 in honour of James FitzGerald.

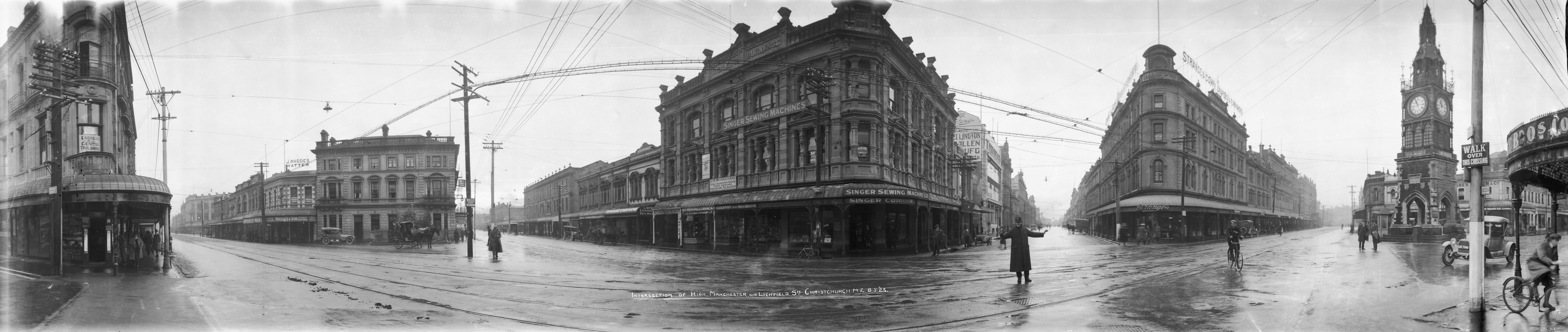
Intersection of High, Manchester and Lichfield Streets, Christchurch, 8 May 1923

==== Streets running east–west ====
- Bealey Avenue – the original name for this street was North Belt and North Town Belt. On 11 January 1904, it got renamed in honour of Canterbury's third Superintendent Samuel Bealey, who owned land in this area.
- Salisbury Street (original street name) – the street is named after the English Diocese of Salisbury.
- Peterborough Street (original street name) – the street is named after the Anglican Diocese of Peterborough.
- Kilmore Street (original street name) – the street is named after the Irish Diocese of Kilmore.
- Chester Street (original street name) – the street is named after the English Anglican Diocese of Chester. It appears in 1883 street directories as Chester Street between East Town Belt and Colombo Street, and Chester Street West between Cambridge Terrace and Park Terrace. Chester Street West was renamed Cranmer Terrace for a short time in the 1950s because of the gap in Chester Street between Colombo Street and Cambridge Terrace. It reverted to its earlier name when the residents found that there was confusion with Cranmer Square.
- Armagh Street (original street name) – the street is named after the Diocese of Armagh.
- Gloucester Street (original street name) – the street is named after the Diocese of Gloucester.

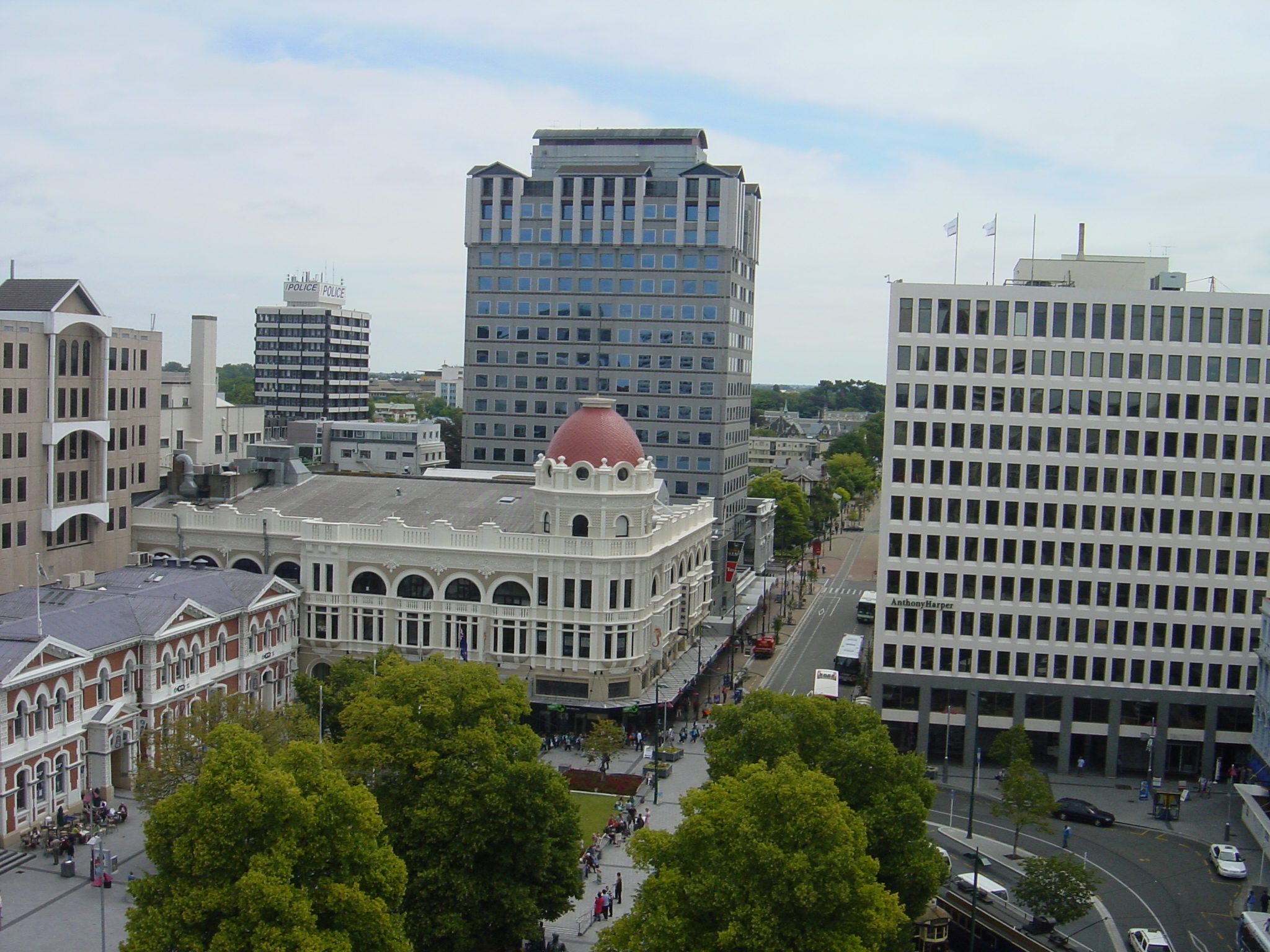
Worcester Street and Cathedral Square from the ChristChurch Cathedral

- Worcester Street (original street name) – the street is named after the Anglican Diocese of Worcester.
- Hereford Street (original street name) – the street is named after the Diocese of Hereford.
- Cashel Street (original street name) – the street is named after the bishopric of Cashel.
- Lichfield Street (original street name) – the street is named after the Diocese of Lichfield.
- Tuam Street (original street name) – the street is named after the Irish Diocese of Tuam.
- St Asaph Street (original street name) – the street is named after the Diocese of St Asaph in Wales.
- Moorhouse Avenue – the original name for this street was South Belt and South Town Belt. On 11 January 1904, it got renamed in honour of Canterbury's second superintendent William Sefton Moorhouse, who had championed the development of Christchurch-Lyttelton railway and the Lyttelton rail tunnel. It was thus thought appropriate that the avenue adjacent to the railway be named after him.

==== Other streets ====
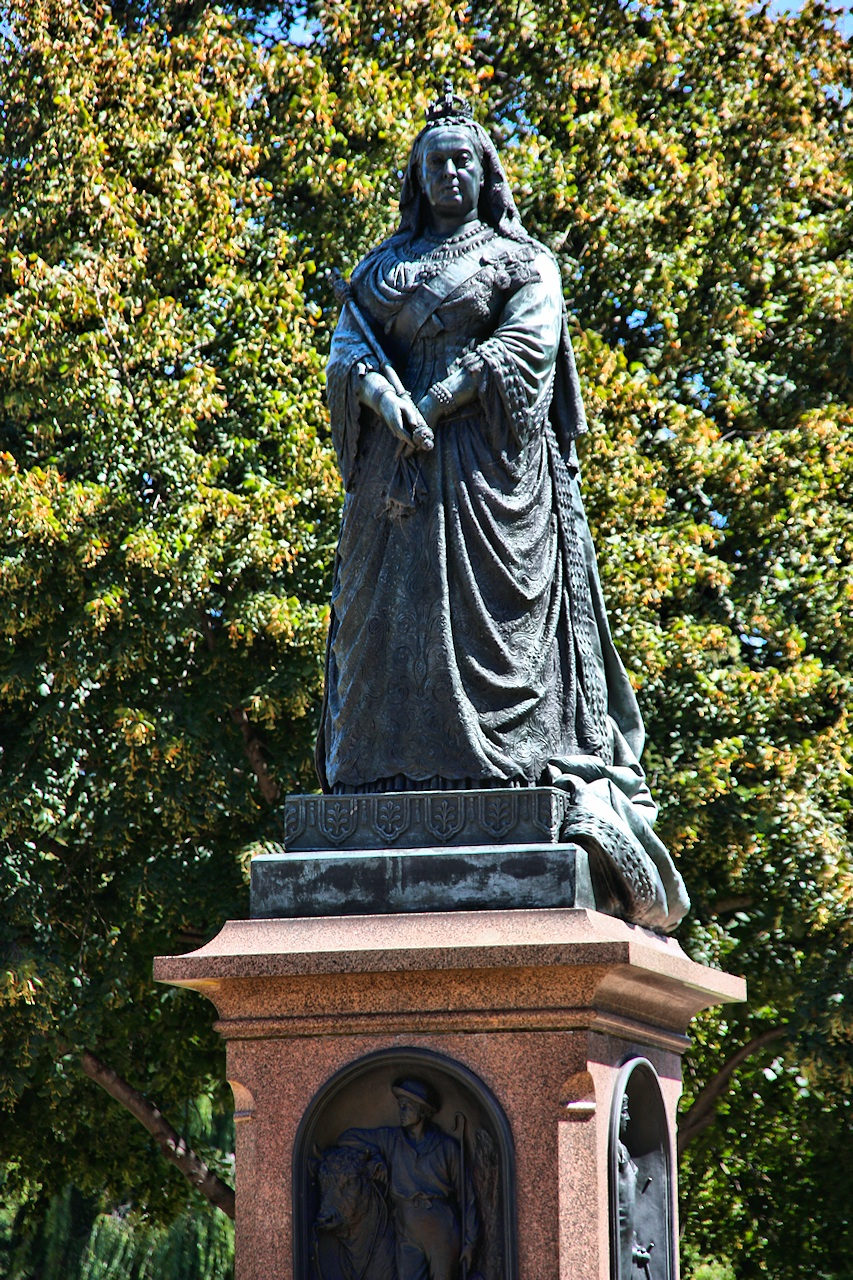
Statue of Queen Victoria, at Victoria Square

- Cambridge Terrace (original street name) – the street is named after the University of Cambridge in England. Waterloo Terrace was the name on the first plan of the road along the Avon River / Ōtākaro from Market Place (now Victoria Square) to past the Foresters' Hall, i.e. from near the Oxford-on-Avon and the Plunket Society round to near the Centennial Leisure Centre. Avonside Road was the section just south of the Barbadoes Street Cemetery, adjacent to the river bank and the river, across the river from the Avon Loop, east of Barbadoes Street and round to Fitzgerald Avenue.
- Oxford Terrace (original street name) – the street is named after the University of Oxford. John Robert Godley, considered to be the founder of Christchurch, had studied at Christ Church, one of the colleges of the University of Oxford.
- Victoria Street – this street was originally named Whately Road after Richard Whately, who was a member of the Canterbury Association. It was renamed Victoria Street in 1877 after a petition signed by 61 residents was presented asking that the name be changed. The current street name commemorates Queen Victoria.
- High Street – this street was originally named Sumner Road, as it connected to the village of Sumner. At the time, Sumner was of great importance to Christchurch, as a road over the Port Hills was to be built connecting Lyttelton with Sumner. The section north of St Asaph Street was renamed High Street.
- Ferry Road – the central city-end of Ferry Road was originally called Sumner Road. The section south of St Asaph Street was renamed Lower High Street, and then Ferry Road.

=== Important Canterbury Association members ===
The prime movers of the Canterbury Association were Edward Gibbon Wakefield and John Robert Godley. Godley, with his family, went out to New Zealand in early 1850 to oversee the preparations for the settlement (surveying, roads, accommodation, etc.) undertaken by Captain Joseph Thomas' team. These preparations were advanced, but incomplete when the first ships of settlers arrived on 16 December 1850, having been halted by Godley shortly after his arrival in April due to the mounting debts of the Association. The Charlotte-Jane and Randolph arrived in Lyttelton Harbour on the 16th, Sir George Seymour on the 17th, and Cressy on the 27th, having set sail from England in September 1850. The settlers on these First Four Ships were dubbed the Canterbury Pilgrims by the British press. A further 24 shiploads of Canterbury Association settlers, making a total of approximately 3,500, arrived over the next two and a half years.

=== 2010–11 earthquakes ===
The central city was among the most damaged areas of Christchurch following the 2010 Canterbury earthquake. Some building façades collapsed into the streets. Manchester Courts, the tallest commercial building in Christchurch when it was built in 1905–06, and a Category I heritage building, suffered serious structural damage and was demolished shortly before the 2011 Christchurch earthquake struck.

On 22 February 2011, another earthquake, measuring magnitude 6.3, struck the city at 12:51 pm. It was located closer to the city, and although lower on the moment magnitude scale than the previous earthquake, the intensity and violence of the ground shaking was measured to be IX (Violent) on the Mercalli intensity scale, and was among the strongest recorded globally in an urban area. 185 people were killed. ChristChurch Cathedral lost its spire and widespread damage was caused to city buildings already weakened by 4 September 2010 earthquake and its aftershocks.

Many heritage buildings have been demolished since the earthquake, and most of the city's high rise buildings, including Hotel Grand Chancellor, PricewaterhouseCoopers, Clarendon Tower, and Radio Network House have been demolished.

Churches were demolished too, following the earthquakes, including Durham Street Methodist Church, Oxford Terrace Baptist Church, St Luke's Church, St Paul's Church, the Cathedral of the Blessed Sacrament and St John the Baptist Church. Other churches are badly damaged and their fate is undecided, including the Anglican ChristChurch Cathedral. A replacement Anglican cathedral, the Cardboard Cathedral, opened in August 2013 on the site of the former St John the Baptist Church.

== Characteristics ==
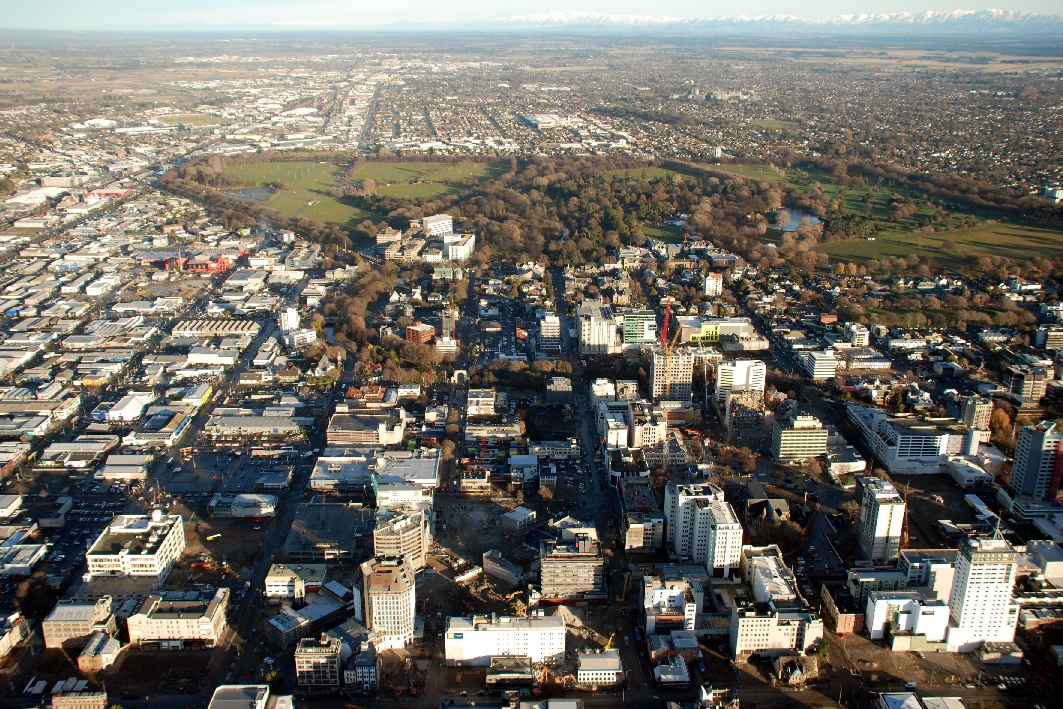
Aerial view of the central city in July 2012, with many of the earthquake-damaged tall buildings still standing

=== Overview ===
The Central City offered well over 450 unique retail businesses and over 130 cafes, restaurants, bars and clubs. It had the largest selection of fashion, food, café and entertainment in the South Island.

The central city has a number of residential areas, including Inner City East, Inner City West, Avon Loop, Moa Neighbourhood and Victoria. South of Tuam Street, commercial usage and some light industries are present. With over 6,000 full-time equivalent students, the Christchurch Polytechnic Institute of Technology is the major education provider in the city centre.

Cathedral Square was a popular destination and hosts attractions such as the speakers' corner made famous by the Wizard of New Zealand, Ian Brackenbury Channell, and evangelist Ray Comfort.

A central city heritage tram system has been operated since 1995. In 2010, the system was extended to the south to form a figure of eight. The tram system does not fulfil a transport function and is aimed at the tourism market.

In 2010 the Christchurch City Council released "A City For People Action Plan", a program of work through to 2022 to improve public spaces within the central city to entice more inner city residents and visitors. A primary action is to reduce the impact of motorised private vehicles and increase the comfort of pedestrians and cyclists. The plan is based on a report prepared for the council by renowned Danish design firm Gehl Architects.

=== Precincts ===
The central city includes the pedestrianised Cashel and High Streets, known as City Mall. At one end of the mall stands the Bridge of Remembrance; at the intersection of Cashel and High Streets is the old location of the amphitheatre known as the Hack Circle; and the portion of High Street up to the junction of Colombo and Hereford Streets forms the remaining part of the mall. The concept of a pedestrian mall originated in 1965 as part of a central city redevelopment study. The project was publicly notified in the 1968 District Scheme, and again in the 1979 review. In 1981, the Christchurch City Council, in collaboration with the Cashel and High Street Businessmen's Associations, adopted a design and authorised implementation. The streets were closed to traffic on 11 January 1982 and the Mall was opened by the former Mayor, Sir Hamish Hay, on 7 August 1982.

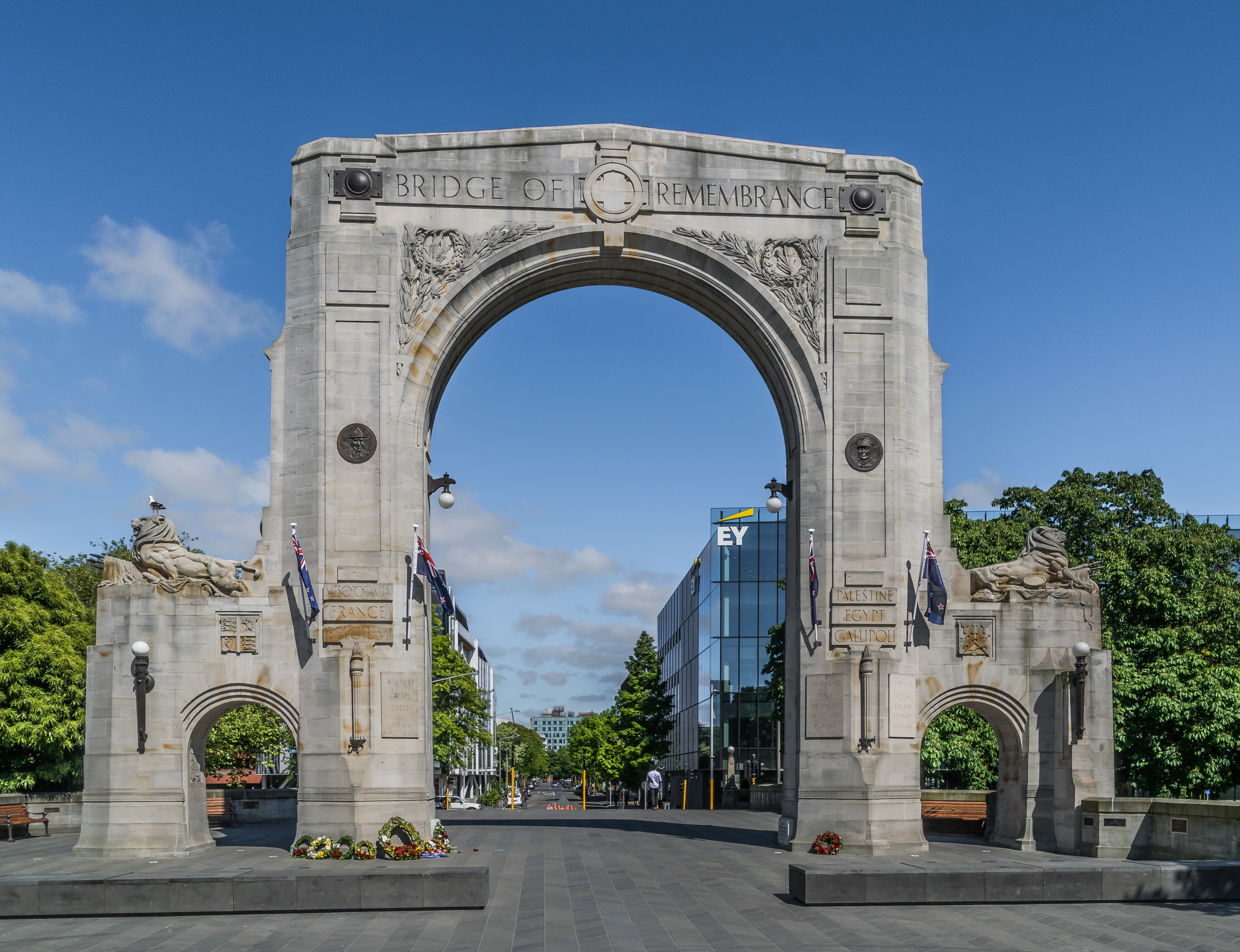
The Bridge of Remembrance in Cashel Street

On 17 December 2009, a revamped City Mall was opened by mayor Bob Parker, incorporating the tourist tram through the mall.

The Bridge of Remembrance was opened on Armistice Day, 11 November 1924 by the Governor-General, Admiral of the Fleet, Lord Jellicoe, who had previously laid the foundation stone on Anzac Day, 25 April 1923. The road through the bridge was removed and the short stretch between Oxford Terrace and Cambridge Terrace opened as a pedestrian precinct on 25 April 1977 (Anzac Day) by Captain Charles Upham, i.e. this stretch became a pedestrian precinct some five years before the establishment of City Mall.

Another pedestrianised street is New Regent Street, which has building façades in the Spanish Mission style. It became a pedestrian mall as part of the heritage tram loop in 1995. The street survived the earthquake with little damage, and is now functioning with several shops, and appearances by the Wizard of New Zealand.

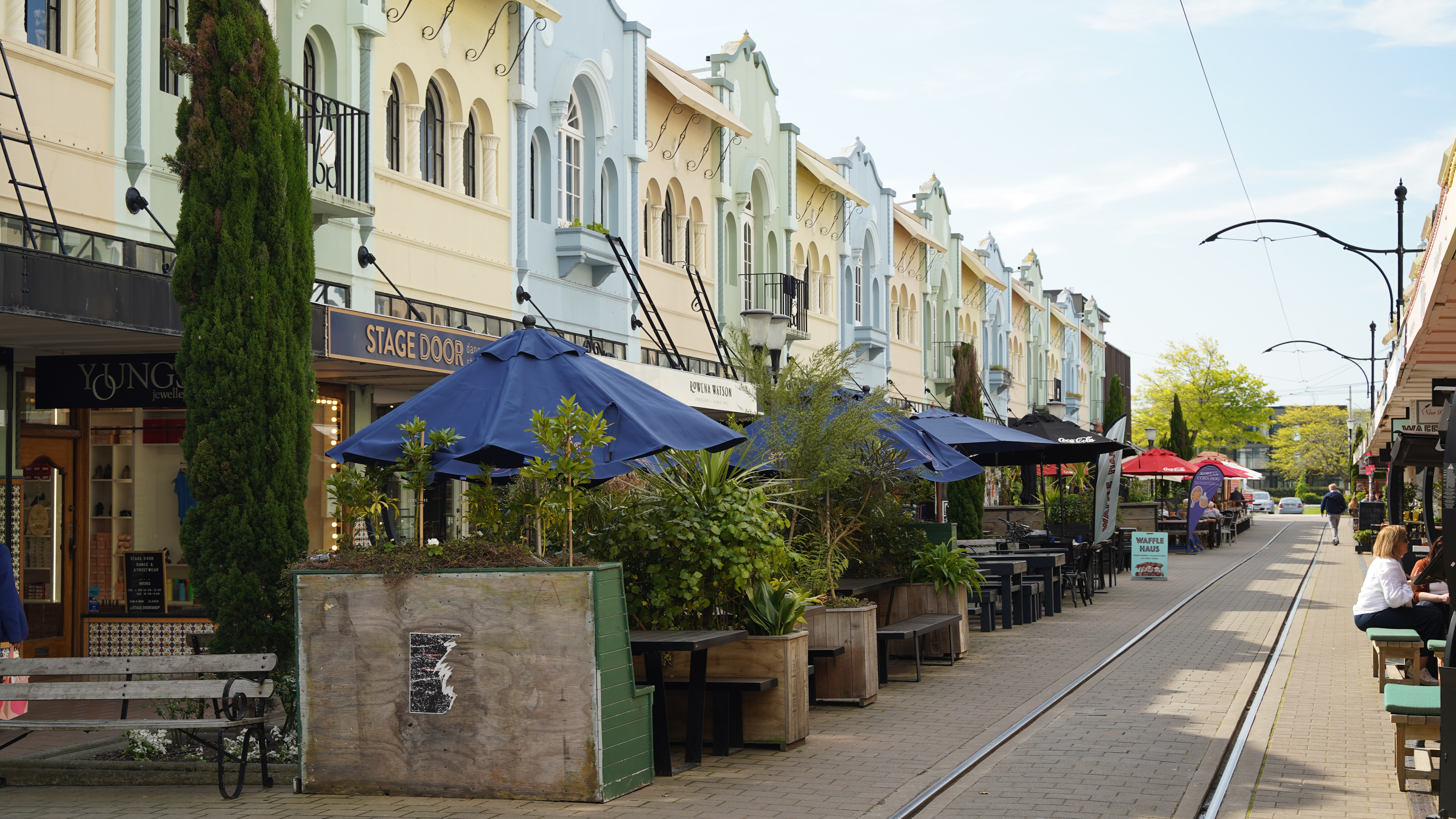
Spanish Mission building frontages in New Regent Street

Prior to the earthquakes, the Christchurch City Council was considering turning a section of Oxford Terrace (the section between Cashel Street and Hereford Street, then known as The Strip) into a part-time pedestrian mall (nightly from 11 pm to 5 am).

Since around 2005, two precincts have developed in small central city lanes, known as Poplar Lane and South of Lichfield or SOL Square. A large number of bars are accommodated in these two areas, with a very active night life. These areas complement The Strip, a part of Oxford Terrace that started to support outdoor dining during the day and night time entertainment in the 1990s.

The Arts Centre, the Canterbury Museum, the Christchurch Art Gallery and the Centre of Contemporary Art (CoCA) are located in the Cultural Precinct. The majority of the activities are free.

=== Shopping centres ===
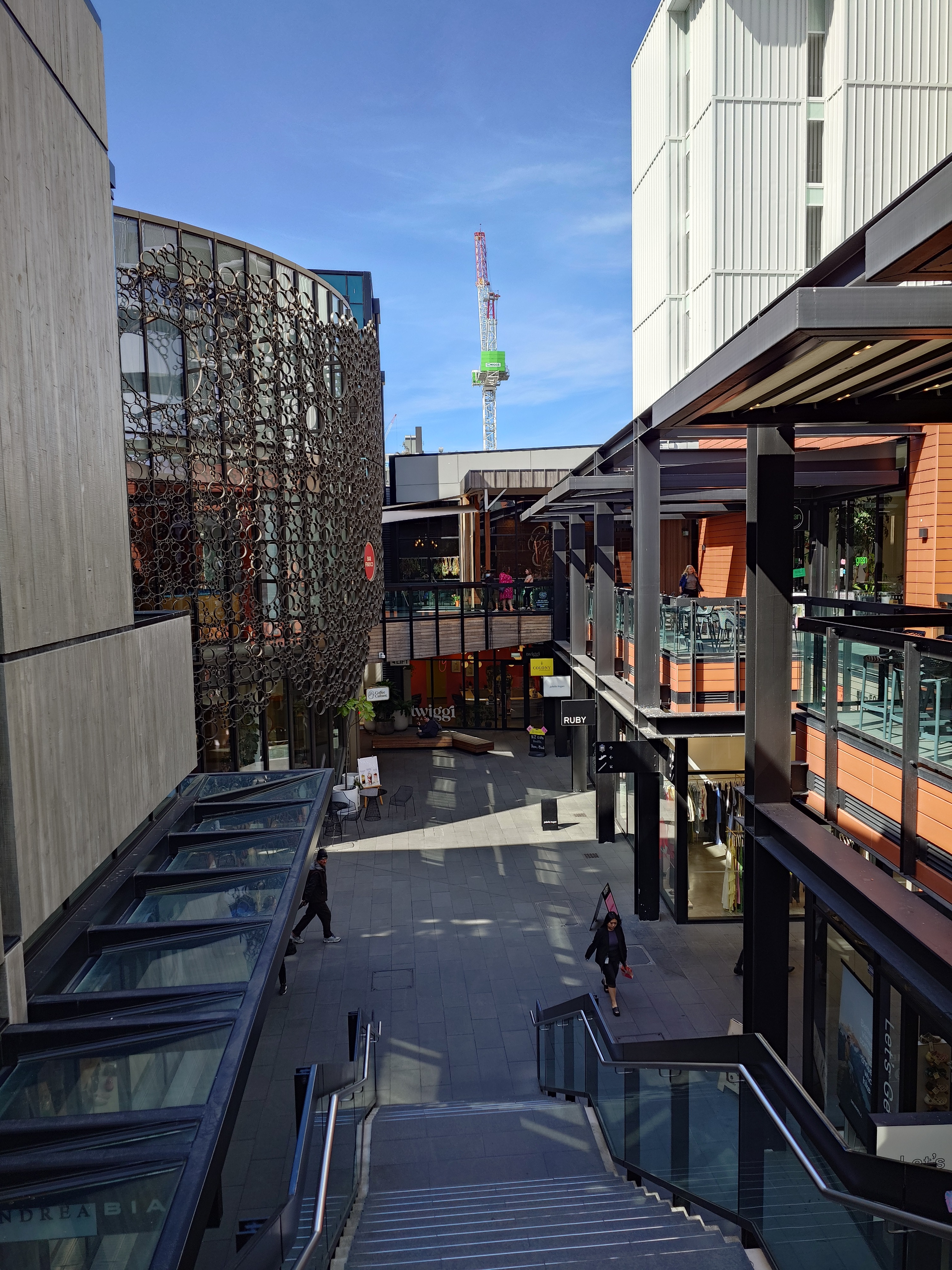
The Crossing

Central Christchurch has two enclosed malls.

South City Shopping Centre opened in 1990 and covers an area of 2,700 m^{2}. It has 550 carparks and 32 stores, and is anchored by a Chemist Warehouse and JB Hi-Fi.

The Crossing shopping centre opened in 2017. It covers 1,400 m^{2} with 630 carparks. The mall has 40 stores, including H&M and FreshChoice.

=== Heritage buildings ===
The central city has a large number of registered heritage buildings that are either listed with Heritage New Zealand or are noted in the Christchurch City Plan. A large number of these buildings have been significantly damaged by the 2010 and 2011 earthquakes. Some heritage buildings collapsed during the February earthquake (e.g. the Stone Chamber of the Canterbury Provincial Council Buildings), many have been demolished already (e.g. St Elmo Courts, The Press Building or St Luke's Church), and for many heritage buildings, the fate is as yet unclear (e.g. the Peterborough Centre.) McLean's Mansion in Manchester Street, a 53-room dwelling built in 1900 for 78-year-old bachelor Allan McLean, is currently threatened with demolition.

=== Population ===
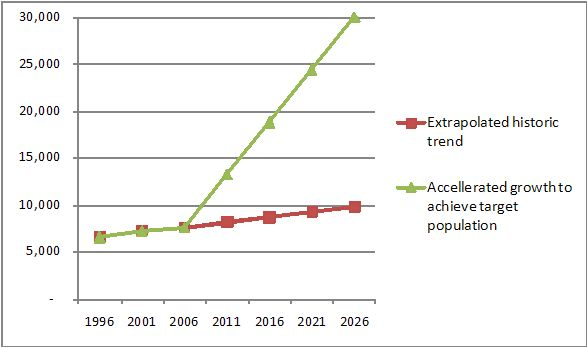
Comparing extrapolated historic growth in resident population with required growth to reach 30,000 residents by 2026.

The central city prior to the 2010–2011 earthquakes had an increasing residential population. The last four New Zealand censuses had the usual resident population on 30 June recorded as follows:

Census resident population
| Census | 1996 | 2001 | 2006 | 2013 |
|---|---|---|---|---|
| Resident population | 6600 | 7369 | 7653 | 4899 |

The Christchurch City Council alongside Ōtākaro Limited is trying to revitalise the central city. The Council aspires to have 30,000 residents living within the Four Avenues by 2026. When the historic census population (for 1996, 2001 and 2006) is plotted and extrapolated to 2026, and compared to the required growth to reach a projected population of 30,000 residents by 2026, it becomes clear that this is an ambitious goal. Entire city blocks have been earmarked for residential development, as well as private developments, aiming toward this goal.

Christchurch City Centre covers 6.34 km^{2} (2.45 sq mi). It had an estimated population of 9,180 as of June 2025, with a population density of 1,448 people per km^{2}.

Historical population
| Year | Pop. | ±% p.a. |
|---|---|---|
| 2006 | 7,650 | — |
| 2013 | 4,902 | −6.16% |
| 2018 | 5,925 | +3.86% |
| 2023 | 8,148 | +6.58% |

Christchurch Centre had a population of 8,148 in the 2023 New Zealand census, an increase of 2,223 people (37.5%) since the 2018 census, and an increase of 3,246 people (66.2%) since the 2013 census. There were 4,107 males, 3,948 females, and 93 people of other genders in 4,050 dwellings. 10.3% of people identified as LGBTIQ+. The median age was 32.2 years (compared with 38.1 years nationally). There were 588 people (7.2%) aged under 15 years, 2,904 (35.6%) aged 15 to 29, 3,816 (46.8%) aged 30 to 64, and 840 (10.3%) aged 65 or older.

People could identify as more than one ethnicity. The results were 71.1% European (Pākehā); 9.9% Māori; 2.5% Pasifika; 21.6% Asian; 4.3% Middle Eastern, Latin American and African New Zealanders (MELAA); and 1.7% other, which includes people giving their ethnicity as "New Zealander". English was spoken by 96.2%, Māori by 2.4%, Samoan by 0.4%, and other languages by 24.0%. No language could be spoken by 1.5% (e.g. too young to talk). New Zealand Sign Language was known by 0.7%. The percentage of people born overseas was 40.4, compared with 28.8% nationally.

Religious affiliations were 25.5% Christian, 4.0% Hindu, 1.9% Islam, 0.4% Māori religious beliefs, 1.4% Buddhist, 0.7% New Age, 0.1% Jewish, and 2.7% other religions. People who answered that they had no religion were 57.5%, and 5.9% of people did not answer the census question.

Of those at least 15 years old, 3,240 (42.9%) people had a bachelor's or higher degree, 3,057 (40.4%) had a post-high school certificate or diploma, and 1,269 (16.8%) people exclusively held high school qualifications. The median income was $48,900, compared with $41,500 nationally. 987 people (13.1%) earned over $100,000 compared to 12.1% nationally. The employment status of those at least 15 was 4,623 (61.2%) full-time, 987 (13.1%) part-time, and 279 (3.7%) unemployed.

Individual statistical areas
| Name | Area (km^{2}) | Population | Density (per km^{2}) | Dwellings | Median age | Median income |
|---|---|---|---|---|---|---|
| Hagley Park | 2.19 | 150 | 68 | 18 | 29.4 years | $27,600 |
| Christchurch Central-West | 0.69 | 1,185 | 1,717 | 639 | 35.7 years | $55,400 |
| Christchurch Central-North | 0.78 | 3,030 | 3,885 | 1,530 | 33.8 years | $48,300 |
| Christchurch Central | 0.71 | 114 | 161 | 66 | 45.4 years | $47,200 |
| Christchurch Central-East | 0.71 | 2,814 | 3,963 | 1,425 | 31.1 years | $49,500 |
| Christchurch Central-South | 1.25 | 858 | 686 | 375 | 28.3 years | $42,900 |
| New Zealand | | | | | 38.1 years | $41,500 |

=== Economy ===
The central city is an important employment area supporting 26,000 full-time equivalent (FTE) employees, and with much of the floor area taken up by office space. One of the biggest employers is Christchurch City Council with 800 FTE at the civic offices.

The southern part of the central city has traditionally been home to manufacturing, but there has been a decline in this area, with many companies either moving to commercial subdivisions, closing, or relocating overseas.

=== Education ===
Many education providers are located in the city centre. Ara Institute of Canterbury with 6000 students is the largest of these.

There are several schools in the central city.

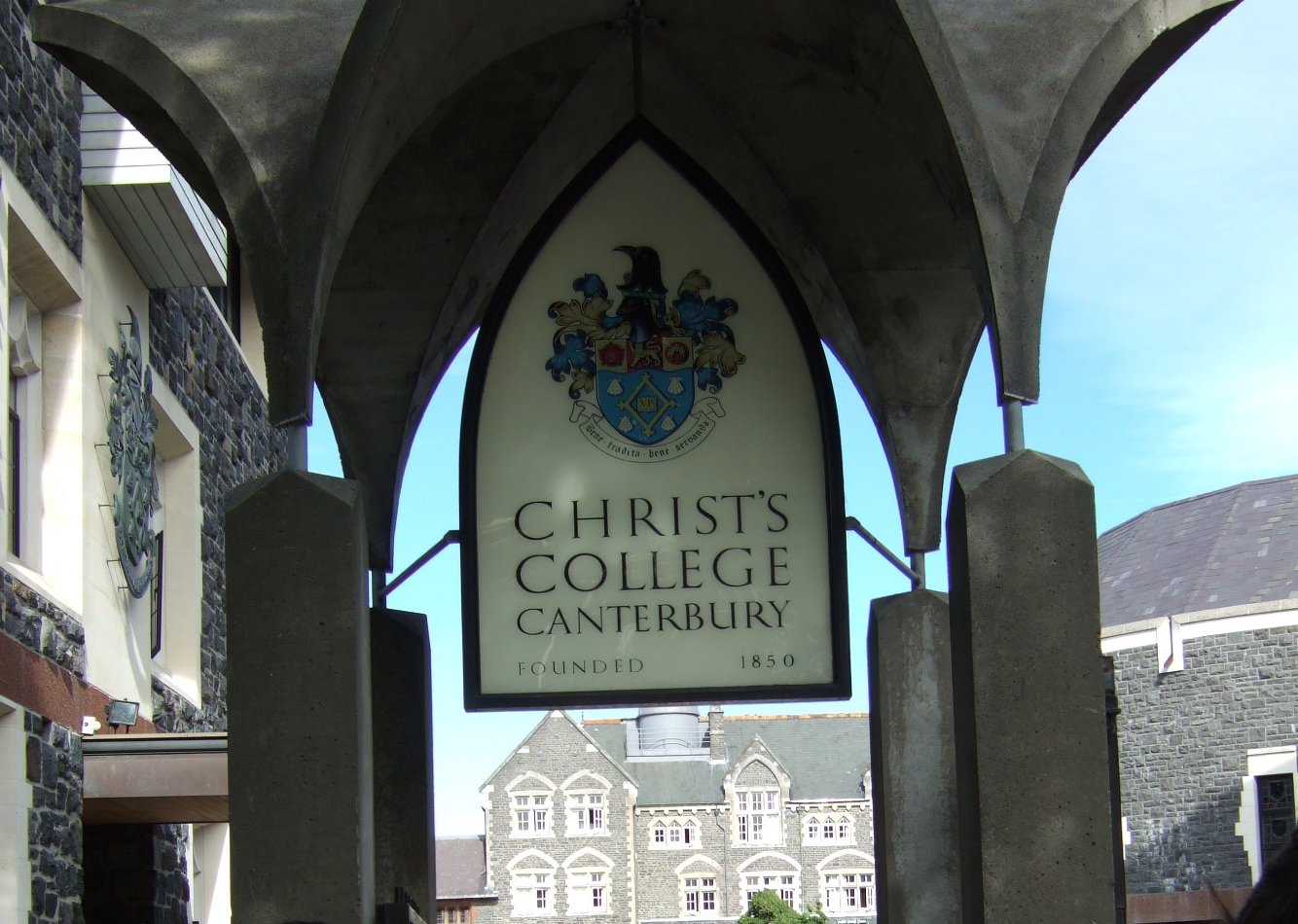
Main entrance of Christ's College

- Christ's College is an independent, Anglican, secondary, day and boarding school for boys. It has a roll of 706 students. Founded in 1850 at Lyttelton as a school for early settlers, Christ's is the oldest independent school in the country. Christ's College Big School is the oldest education building in continuous use in New Zealand.
- St Michael's Church School is a co-educational Anglican primary and intermediate day school. It has a roll of 126 students. It was founded in 1851.
- Hagley College is a non-integrated state secondary school, with a roll of 2,037 students. Prior to 1965 the school was Christchurch West High School, which was founded in 1858.
- The Cathedral Grammar School is an independent, Anglican preparatory day school. It has a roll of 245 students. It was founded in 1881 to educate 24 scholarship boys, who sang in the choir of Christchurch Cathedral. It is one of only a small number of 'choir schools' in the Southern Hemisphere.
- Ao Tawhiti is a state composite school based in the heart of the Christchurch Central Business District, with a roll of 649 students. It was established in 2014 with a merger of Discovery 1, a primary school, and Unlimited Paenga Tawhiti, a secondary school.
- Christchurch East School is a non-integrated state co-educational primary school, with a roll of 294 students. The school was established in 1873.
- Catholic Cathedral College is an integrated co-educational secondary school. It has a roll of 601 students. It was founded in 1987 from the amalgamation of two schools: Sacred Heart College for girls, and Xavier College for boys. Marian College shares space with Catholic Cathedral College until its new campus is completed in 2023.
- St Mary's School is a Catholic state-integrated primary school with a roll of 123 students. St Mary's was established in 1894.

Rolls are as of July 2026.

=== Green space ===
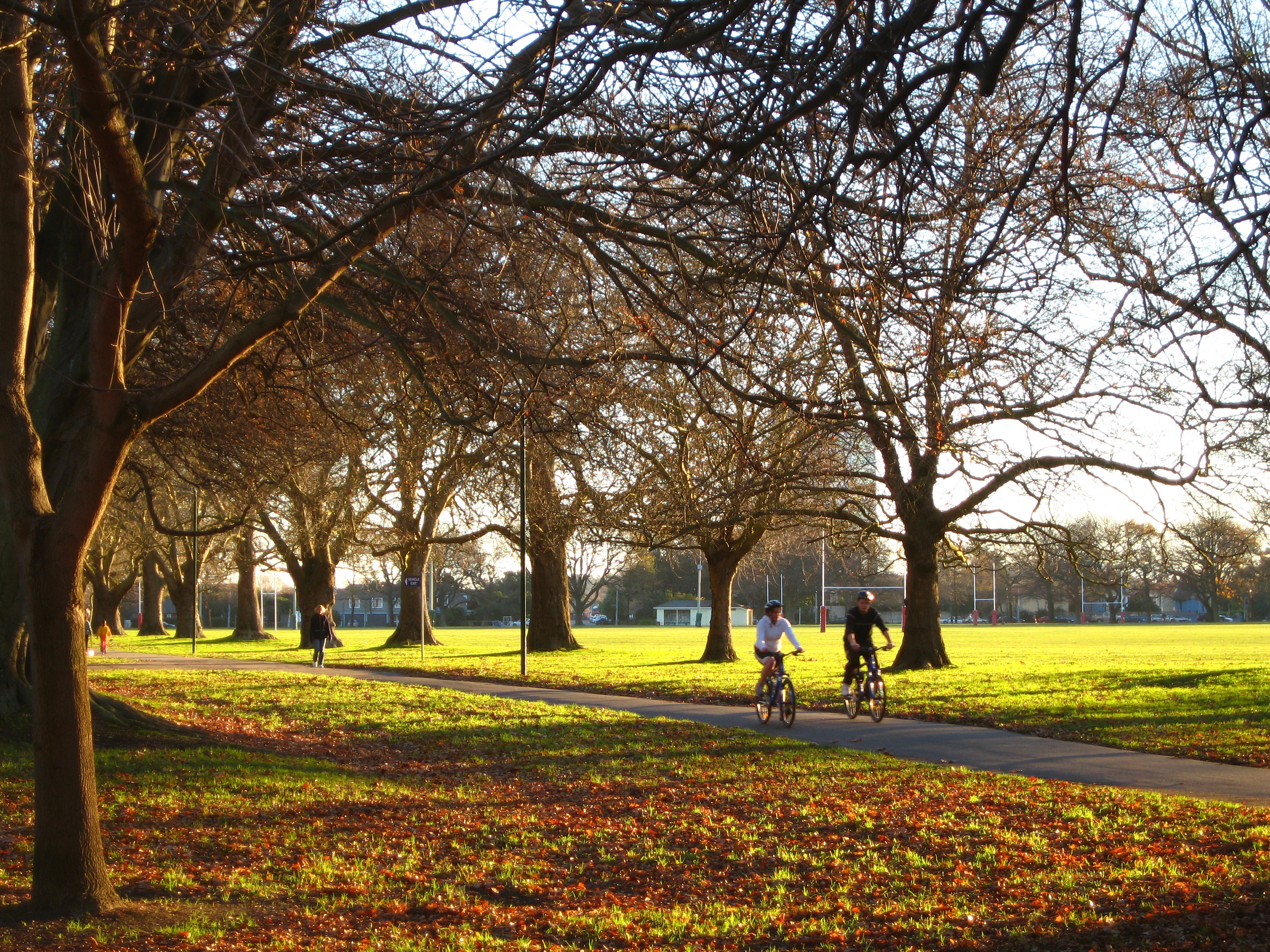
Late afternoon in Hagley Park

Hagley Park is, at 165 ha, the largest urban open space in Christchurch. The park was created in 1855 by the Provincial Government. According to the government's decree at that time, Hagley Park is "reserved forever as a public park, and shall be open for the recreation and enjoyment of the public." Hagley Park is characterised by its trees and broad open spaces. Hagley Park was named after the country estate of Lord Lyttelton, who became chairman of the Canterbury Association in March 1850.

The Christchurch Botanic Gardens are botanical gardens founded in 1863, when on 9 July an English oak was planted to commemorate the solemnisation of marriage between Prince Albert and Princess Alexandra of Denmark. The Gardens cover an area of 21 hectares, and lie adjacent to the loop of the Avon River / Ōtākaro next to Hagley Park.

The Barbadoes Street Cemetery is a large green space in the north-east of the central city. It is the city's oldest cemetery and opened in 1851. It is the final resting place of many of Christchurch's early leading citizens. The cemetery itself is divided by Barbadoes Street separating the Anglican (Church of England) section, on the eastern side, from the Roman Catholic and Dissenters (others) section on the west. The cemetery was initially envisaged to be much larger, but with the establishment of suburbs and villages with their own cemeteries, it became clear that less land was needed. The cemetery was subdivided in 1896 and Churchill Street was formed, with the eastern part of the original cemetery thus becoming a residential area.

== Transport ==
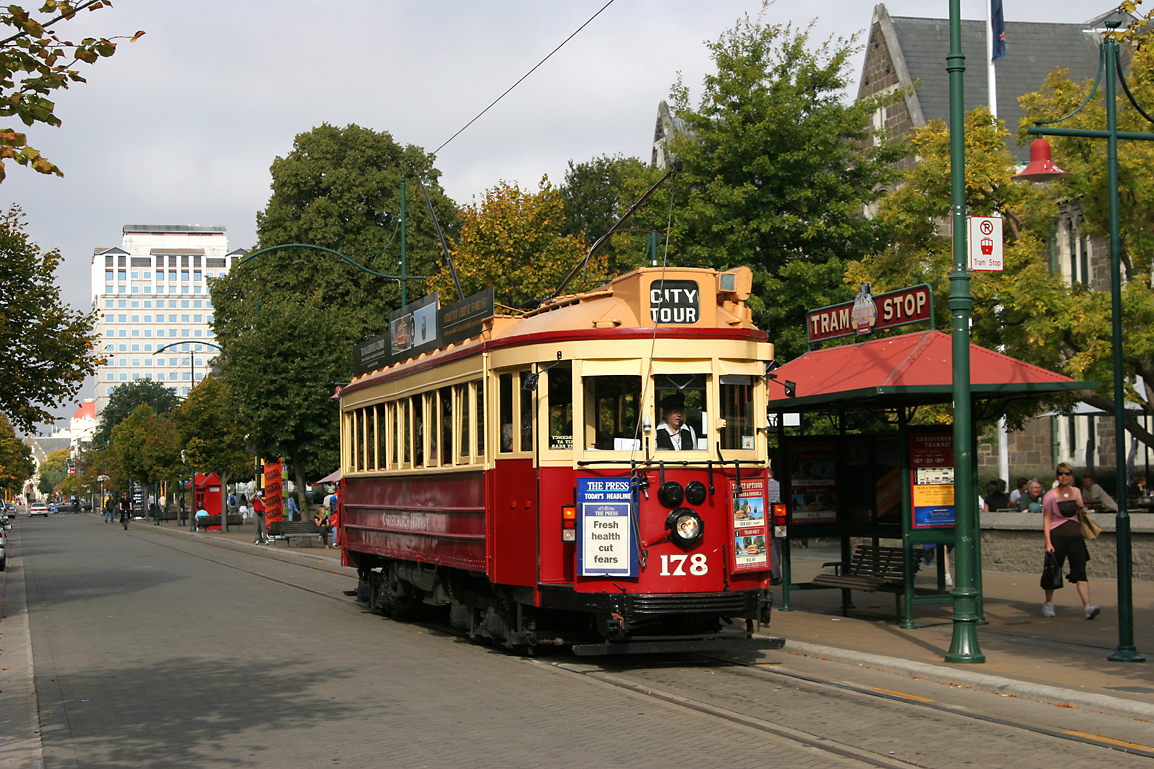
A Christchurch tram in February 2007

Due to the grid pattern of the roads, the central city has a high number of traffic signals. Four pairs of one-way streets are located only a few hundred metres away from Cathedral Square, making it easy to drive through the city centre. The avenues in the north, east and south surrounding the central city are generally six-lane median divided. Fitzgerald and Bealey Avenues stand out due to the trees in those central medians.

With about 35,000 car parks (both public and private), the central city has one of the highest ratios of car parking and employment of the OECD countries. As both driving and parking is relatively easy, Christchurch has a high car ownership rate.

Cycling is reasonably popular in central Christchurch, with the second highest rate of commuter cycling in New Zealand (after Nelson). Free covered bike lock-ups are located in 4 car parking building around the central city.

Public transport in Christchurch is mainly based on buses and supported by taxis. There is a functioning tram service in Christchurch, but as a tourist attraction, its loop is restricted to a circuit of the central city and it does not fulfil a public transport function.

The current Bus Interchange was opened in May 2015 on the block surrounded by Lichfield, Colombo, Tuam and Durham streets, before the 2010 and 2011 Earthquakes a Bus Exchange operated between Lichfield and Cashel streets which had opened in November 2000.

Long-distance buses depart mostly from Lichfield Street outside the Bus Interchange. In addition to normal bus services, a zero-fare hybrid bus service called the Shuttle, use to operate around the central city before the February 2011 earthquake but the service has been proposed to restart many times most recently in 2022.

The railway station used to be located on the southern boundary of the central city on Moorhouse Avenue, but has since been relocated to the suburb of Addington in 1993.
