= The Shuttle (bus) =

Bus service in Christchurch, New Zealand

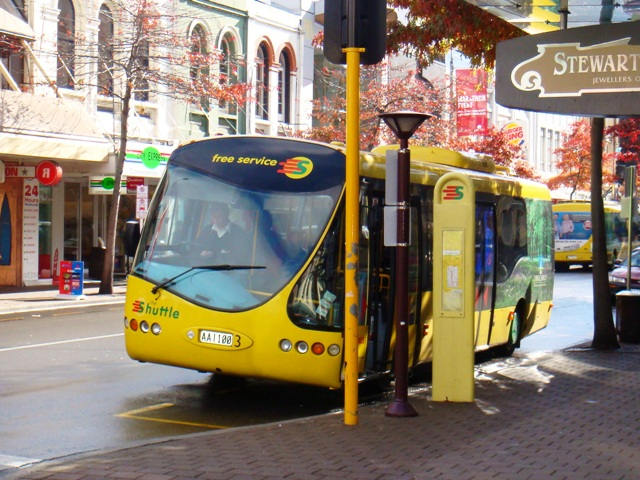
- The Shuttle in Colombo Street

Overview
- Operator: Red Bus
- Garage: Fitzgerald Avenue depot
- Vehicle: Designline Olymbus
- Status: defunct
- Began service: 1 December 1998
- Ended service: 22 February 2011

Route
- Locale: Christchurch Central City

Service
- Level: Daily
- Frequency: 10-min
- Annual patronage: 1 million

The Shuttle was a free bus service in Central Christchurch, New Zealand. Introduced in December 1998, the popular service represented the first use of turbine-electric hybrid vehicles in New Zealand. It was operated until the February 2011 Christchurch earthquake and carried about one million passengers per year. It was not reinstated after the central city cordons were removed in 2013.

== History ==
In Christchurch, as in the rest of New Zealand, public transport is the responsibility of the regional council. In addition to the commercial services organised by Canterbury Regional Council, the Christchurch City Council commenced a free service on either 1 or 12 December 1998 (sources differ). The rationale for the service was to provide an economic stimulus for central city retailers. The operator for the service was Christchurch Transport Ltd (later renamed Red Bus), a company fully owned by the city council through Christchurch City Holdings. A ten-minute headway was provided on weekdays (15-minute headways on weekend days) on a route mostly on Colombo Street. At the southern end, buses were using Moorhouse Avenue to turn around for the northbound journey via Madras and St Asaph streets. At the northern end of the route, buses were using streets in the vicinity of the Christchurch Casino as their terminus. Originally using Kilmore Street (south of the Casino), the night route was extended early on for buses to use Peterborough Street instead, as it was found that there was demand by tourists to go to the Casino.

The service started with three buses, designed by Christchurch industrial designer David Thornley and manufactured by Canterbury bus manufacturer Designline in their Ashburton factory. The service proved immediately successful and popular, and during peak times, some passenger could not get onto the service. The buses were Designline Olymbus turbine-electric hybrid vehicles; the first use of this technology for public transport in New Zealand. The brand name makes reference to their initial purpose; they were designed for the 2000 Summer Olympics in Sydney, Australia, but were unsuccessful in their tender. A fourth vehicle was added in 2001 to provide further capacity on the route. The buses carried about one million passenger per year. (Note: The reference from April 2005 states that "to date the shuttles have carried over 6.5 million passengers". From December 1998 to March 2005, there are 76 months; this equates to 1.03 million passengers per year.)

The Shuttle service stopped with the 2011 Christchurch earthquake. Many buildings in the central city were destroyed by the event and a cordon was implemented—the Central City Red Zone—with the area served by The Shuttle thus out of bounds. The existing contract with the operator expired in June 2011.

== Post-earthquake ==
The central city cordons were removed in June 2013 but The Shuttle was not reinstated. Since 2015, the Greater Christchurch Public Transport Committee coordinates public transport planning in the greater Christchurch area between the regional council, Christchurch City Council, adjacent district councils and the NZ Transport Agency. This group has received three reports on the potential resurrection of The Shuttle (February 2017, June 2017, and October 2017). The outcome was that none of the organisations involved wants to commit funding to it.
