= Public transport in Christchurch =

Public transport overview of Christchurch, New Zealand

Metro

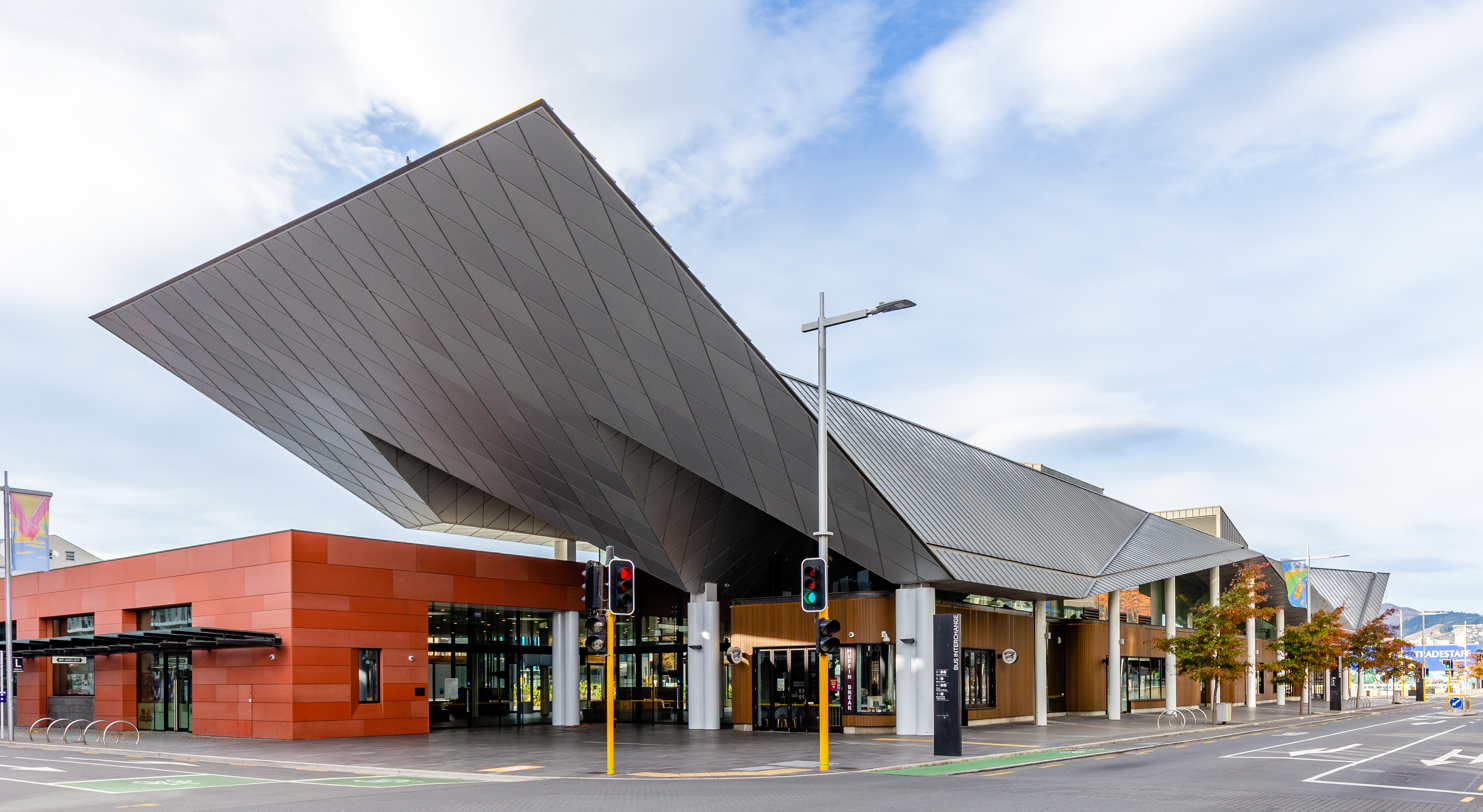
- The Bus Interchange in April 2020
- Locale: New Zealand
- Service area: Christchurch
- Service type: Bus services Ferry services
- Routes: 31 bus routes 1 ferry route
- Annual ridership: 14.5 million (2023/24)
- Fuel type: Diesel, biodiesel, electric
- Operator: Ritchies Transport; Go Bus Christchurch; Black Cat Ltd
- Website: www.metroinfo.co.nz

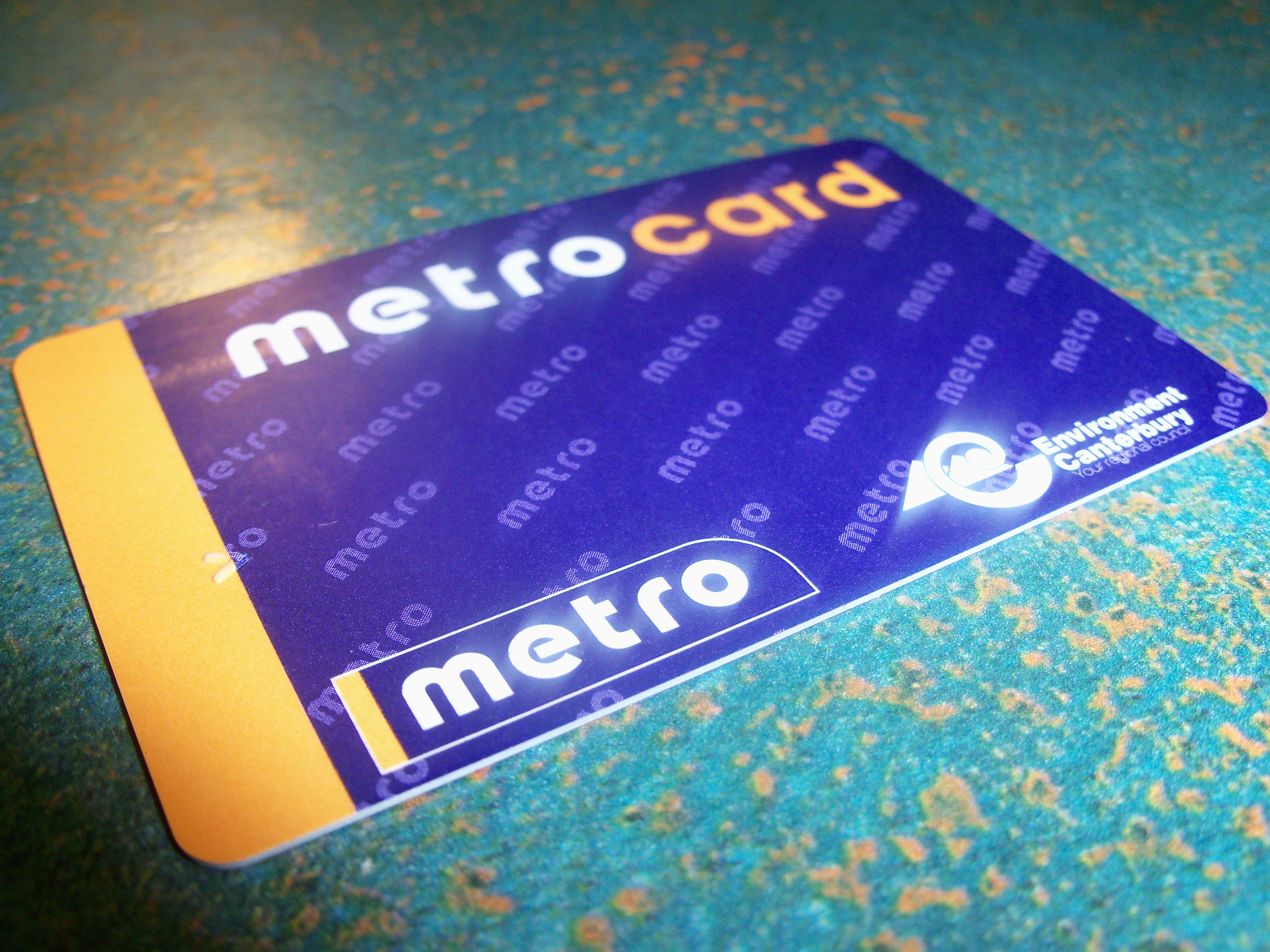
Metrocard issued by Environment Canterbury for use on Metro services

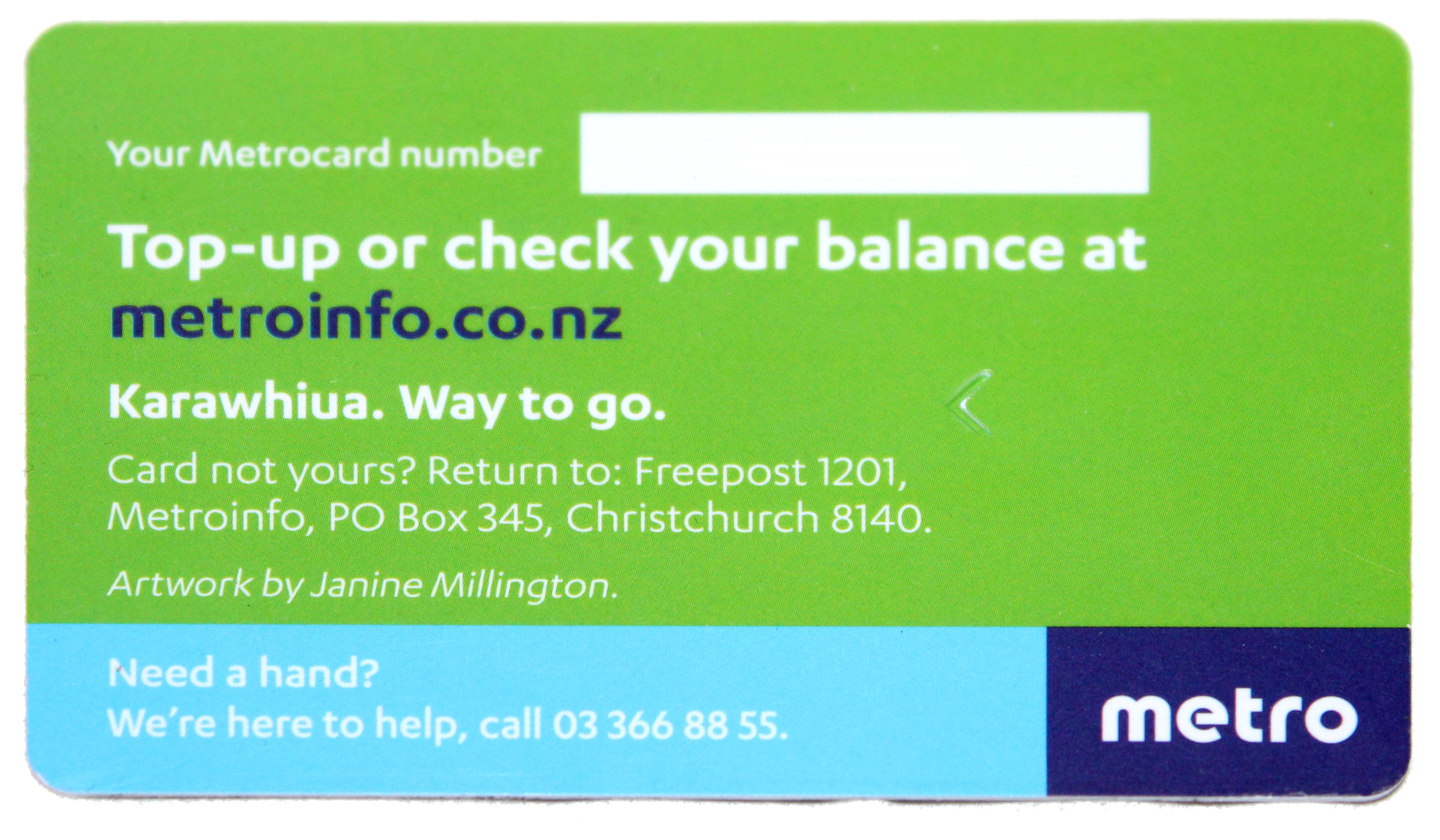
A newer version of the Metrocard

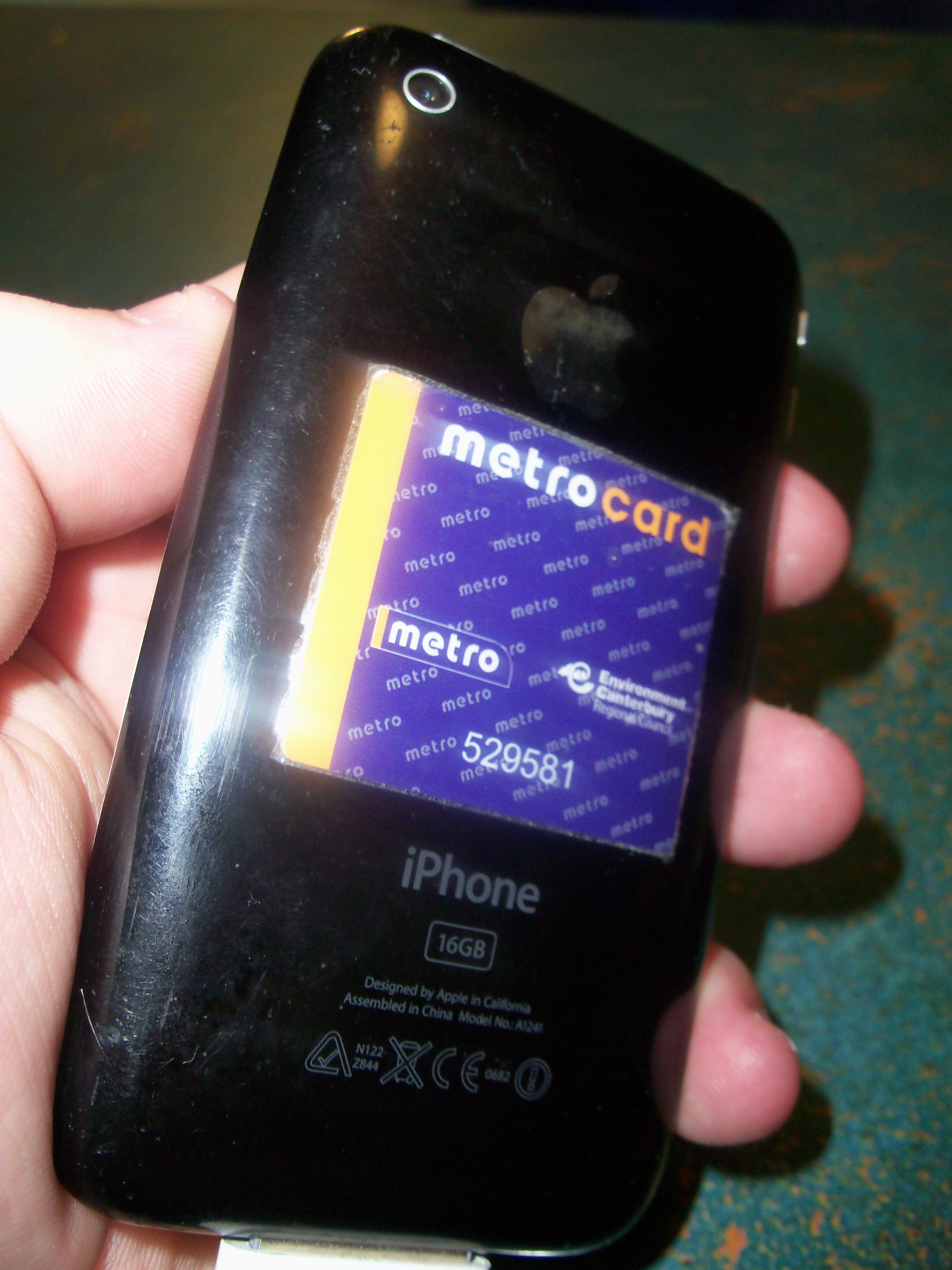
Metrostickki (mobile version) issued by Environment Canterbury for use on Metro services

Public transport in Christchurch, New Zealand, consists primarily of bus services operated by two bus companies, and supported by a ferry, all jointly marketed as Metro, a division of Environment Canterbury (ECan).

Metro also operates the MyWay on-demand bus service in Timaru, Canterbury. Prior to 2023, it also operated various fixed-route bus services in Timaru. In 2020, it began trials of its MyWay service.

== Overview ==
Since deregulation of the urban bus market in 1991, the Canterbury Regional Council (now branded Environment Canterbury) has taken responsibility for the tendering, planning and administration of public transport in Christchurch. Over the course of that time, improvements and changes have shaped the predominantly bus based public transport system, including the introduction of services such as the Orbiter. Originally branded as CanRide, this was replaced in 2003 with the introduction of the Metro brand and the eventual Metrocard.

Ticketing and fares are, with some exceptions, standard across the city's network. The electronic Metrocard provides a discount off regular fares. Under 24s, tertiary students, and Community Service Card holders receive a discount, and senior citizens travel free on off-peak services (9:00am until the end of the day weekdays, all day weekends and public holidays).

Real-time information about the bus network is displayed at select bus stops, and is available online via the first party MetroGo web app or third party apps such as Google Maps or Transit using the GTFS Realtime or SIRI APIs.

The February 2011 Christchurch earthquake resulted in significant changes to the Metro bus network with the two key changes. The first change was the removal and or reorganisation of many routes due to the closure of the central city, road damage along routes, or reduced patronage. The second change occurred in December 2012 with the shift of the bus network from a radial network to a hub and spoke model network and the Blue Line was introduced. This resulted in many services being localised to hubs with connecting core services into the Central City and Cross Town.

More changes were made in December 2014, with the introduction of the Purple Line, Yellow Line and Orange Line, and more suburb to suburb routes.

On 10 November 2025, the contactless fare payment system Motu Move was launched on public buses and the ferry across the Greater Christchurch area including metropolitan Christchurch, the Waimakariri and Selwyn Districts.

== Operations ==
The local bus service is marketed as Metro and designed, specified, put out to tender and subsidised by Environment Canterbury. All bus operators are required to display the required external Metro branding to vehicles under contract to ECan.

Christchurch City Council provides roading infrastructure and street furniture such as signs and seats and regulates parking at bus stops, and is also owner of Red Bus Ltd through its holding company Christchurch City Holdings. The city council previously funded the zero-fare The Shuttle service which ended after the 2011 earthquake.

The Christchurch City Council also provides bus lanes which operational during peak commuting hours on some routes. The routes have been controversial with some business owners concerned at the loss of parking from outside their businesses during the lanes operational times, but the lanes have improved bus travel times, schedule adherence and have resulted in an increase in passenger numbers.

Vehicle safety standards are regulated by the NZ Transport Agency.

=== Bus interchange ===
==== 2000–2011 ====
The city council provided the previous central city bus exchange in November 2000, which was damaged and closed after the earthquake on 22 February 2011. The previous bus exchange in the city centre served as the principal bus interchange point and passenger hub for the Metro network. The Exchange had attracted interest from other worldwide city authorities investigating how to improve their bus services. Since the Bus Exchange opened in 2000, the number of people using the bus service had doubled.

==== 2011–2015 ====
With the closure of the central city, two separate temporary central city facilities on the outer fringes of the CBD were established; one in Bealey Avenue, and one in Hagley Avenue. On 25 October 2011, bus services shifted to the new Central Station between Lichfield and Tuam Streets (in the block between Colombo and Durham Streets), which served as a longer-term temporary city bus stop. The expectation was that Central Station was to be in use for "up to two years".

==== 2015 Bus interchange ====
===== Opening =====
The Christchurch Central Recovery Plan of the Canterbury Earthquake Recovery Authority (CERA) was unveiled on 30 July 2012, which had an indicative time-frame for a new Bus Interchange building to be open by June 2014. Central Station was in use until 25 May 2015, when Christchurch's new $53 million Bus Interchange building opened, with half of the 16 bays operational. On 20 August, the building was physically completed and further opened to the public, including bike parking and more seating. On Thursday 8 October, the remaining bays opened. Later retailers took spaces.

===== Services =====
Part of the hub and spoke model network is that many passengers need to interchange to other buses at suburban centres. The four High Frequency services, which cross the city every 10 to 15 minutes, serve the Interchange, but the Orbiter doesn't. The Interchange also provides for the less frequent buses, longer distance coaches (on Lichfield St, except for Newmans to Queenstown), taxis, cyclists and pedestrians.

===== Design =====
Architectus and Aurecon designed the interchange and Thiess and Southbase Construction built it.

To save space a ‘reversing bus bay’ design of 16 bays has a 7 m (23 ft) backing lane, separated from the 5 m (16 ft) wide circulation lane.

The passenger hall has underfloor heating from a groundwater heat pump. Wind towers and louvres draw air into the hall and air curtains prevent fumes getting in. Each bus route has an area within the interchange, buses being automatically directed to a stop in that area. Doors to the hall open once the bus stops and another door at the front allows cyclists to access bus bike racks. Although pedestrians aren't permitted in the bus manoeuvering area, bus speeds are restricted. Cycle racks for 100 bicycles are on two levels and there are e-bike chargers. There are also toilets, luggage lockers and an information counter. Tactile paving guides sight impaired passengers. A large canopy and verandas provide shelter outside.

=== Riccarton Road lounge ===
The first bus lounge, which provides indoor waiting facilities, was planned for Riccarton Road. ECan requested it to be open in December 2014, but Christchurch city councillors found it difficult to make the required decisions. The opening was initially delayed to April 2015, and the city council then gave itself a new deadline of August 2015, and then said it would be open in November 2015. It wasn't until 14 December 2015 that the Riccarton Road lounge, on the corner with Division Street, finally opened.

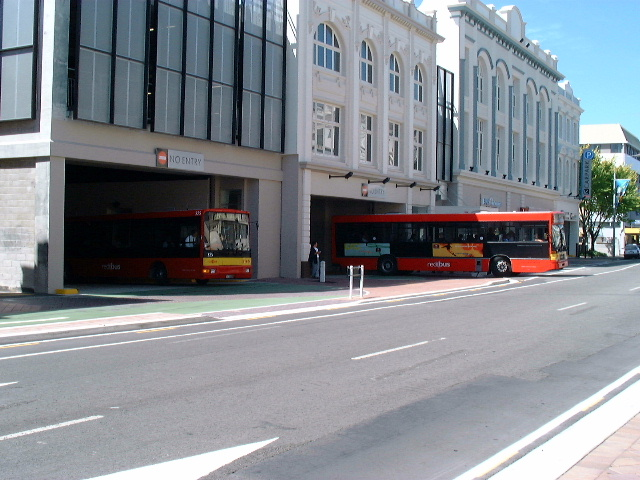
The city's Bus Exchange on Lichfield Street, which operated from November 2000 to February 2011

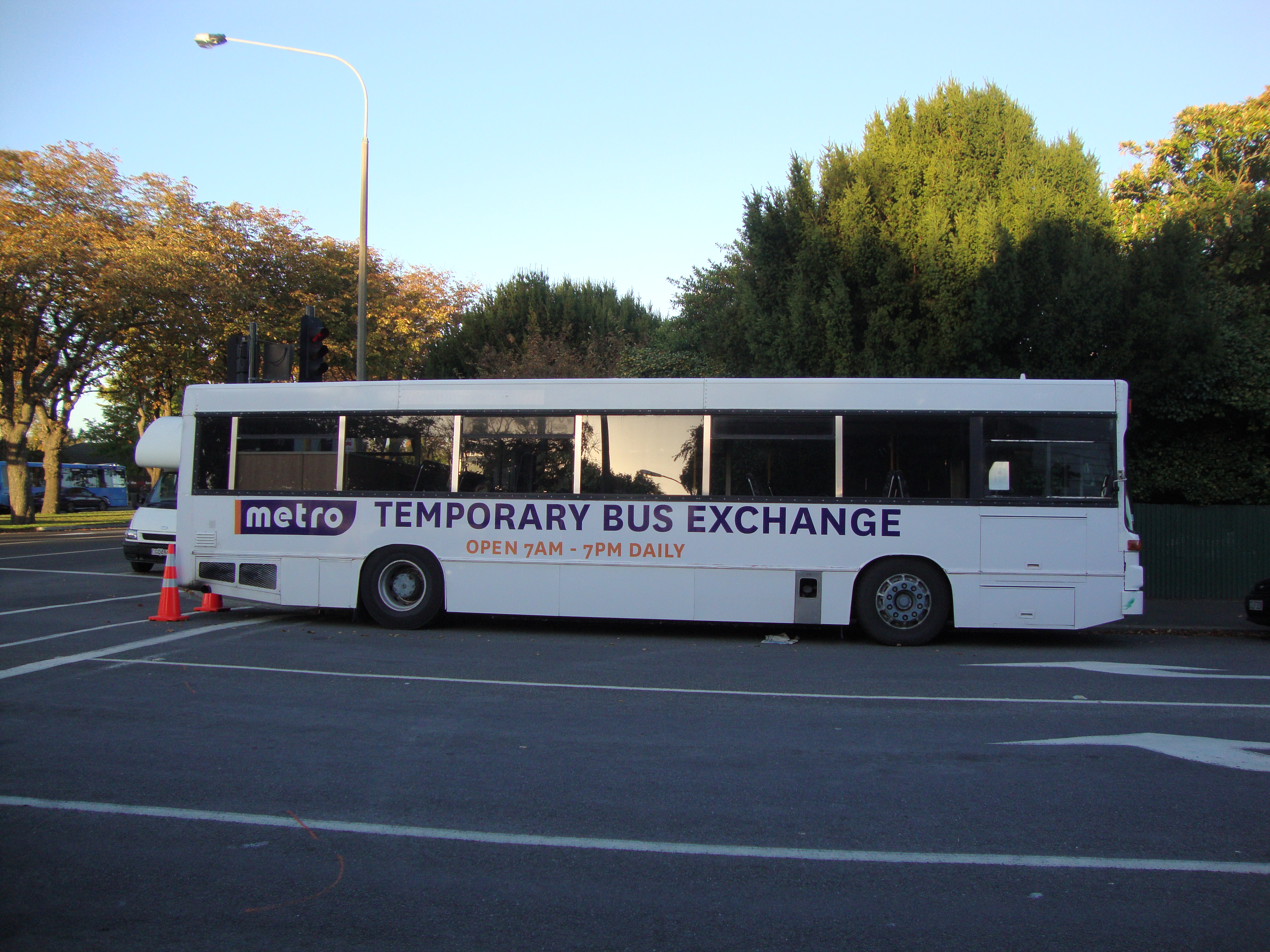
Temporary bus stations were set up after the February 2011 earthquake at the edge of the city centre

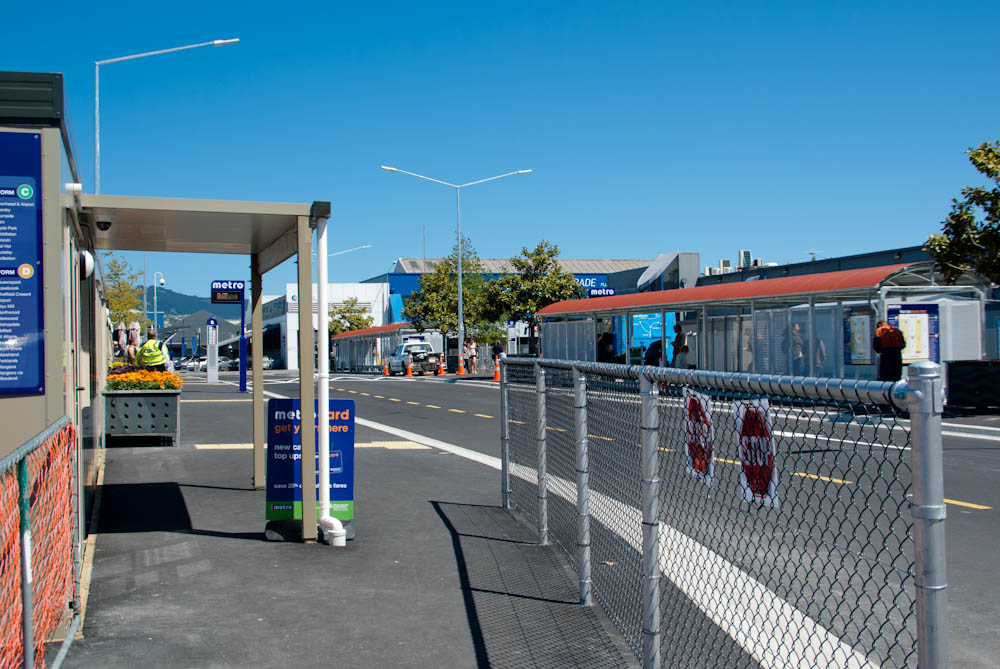
The temporary Central Station in November 2011

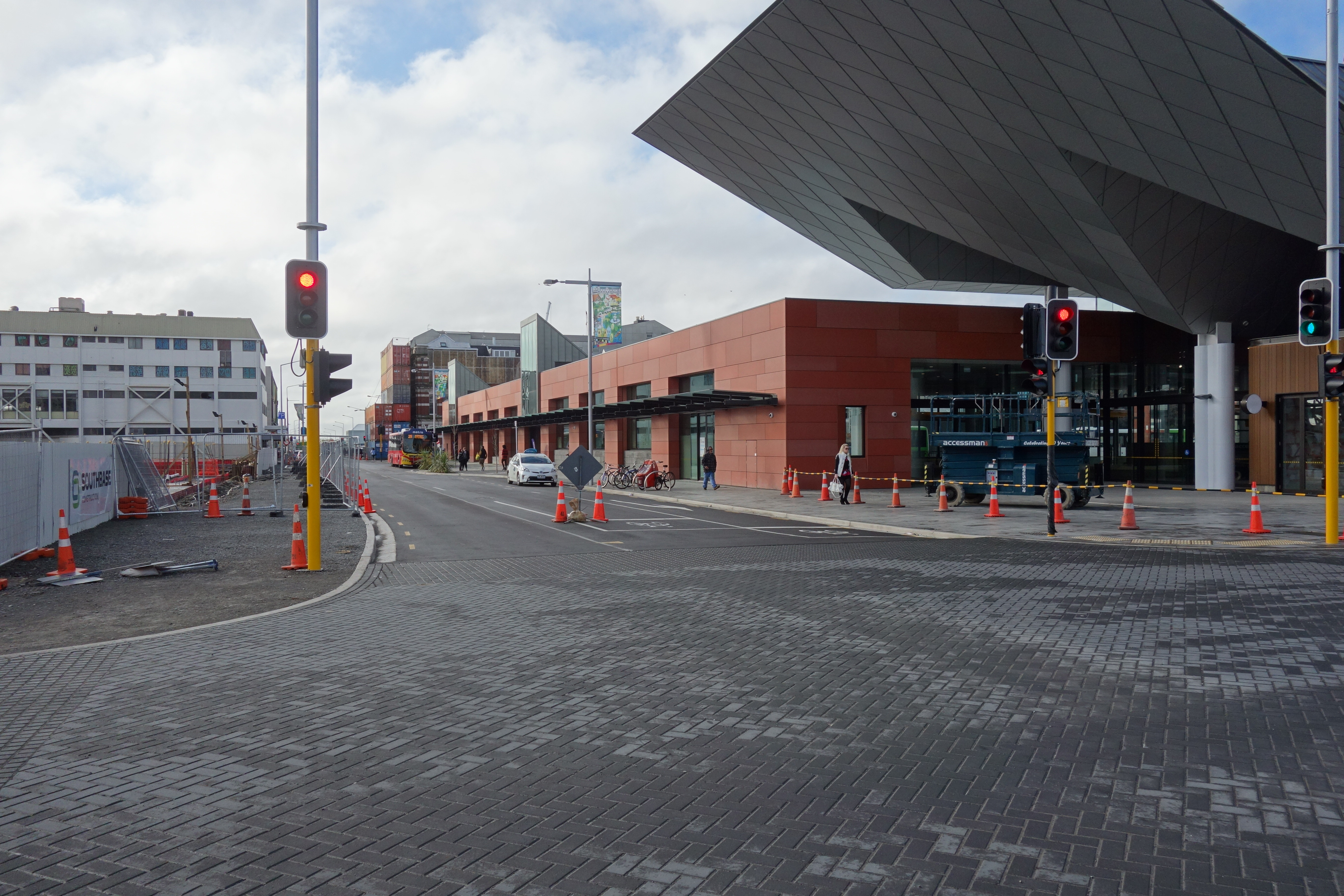
View of the new Bus Interchange along Lichfield Street, opposite the former exchange

== Bus services ==
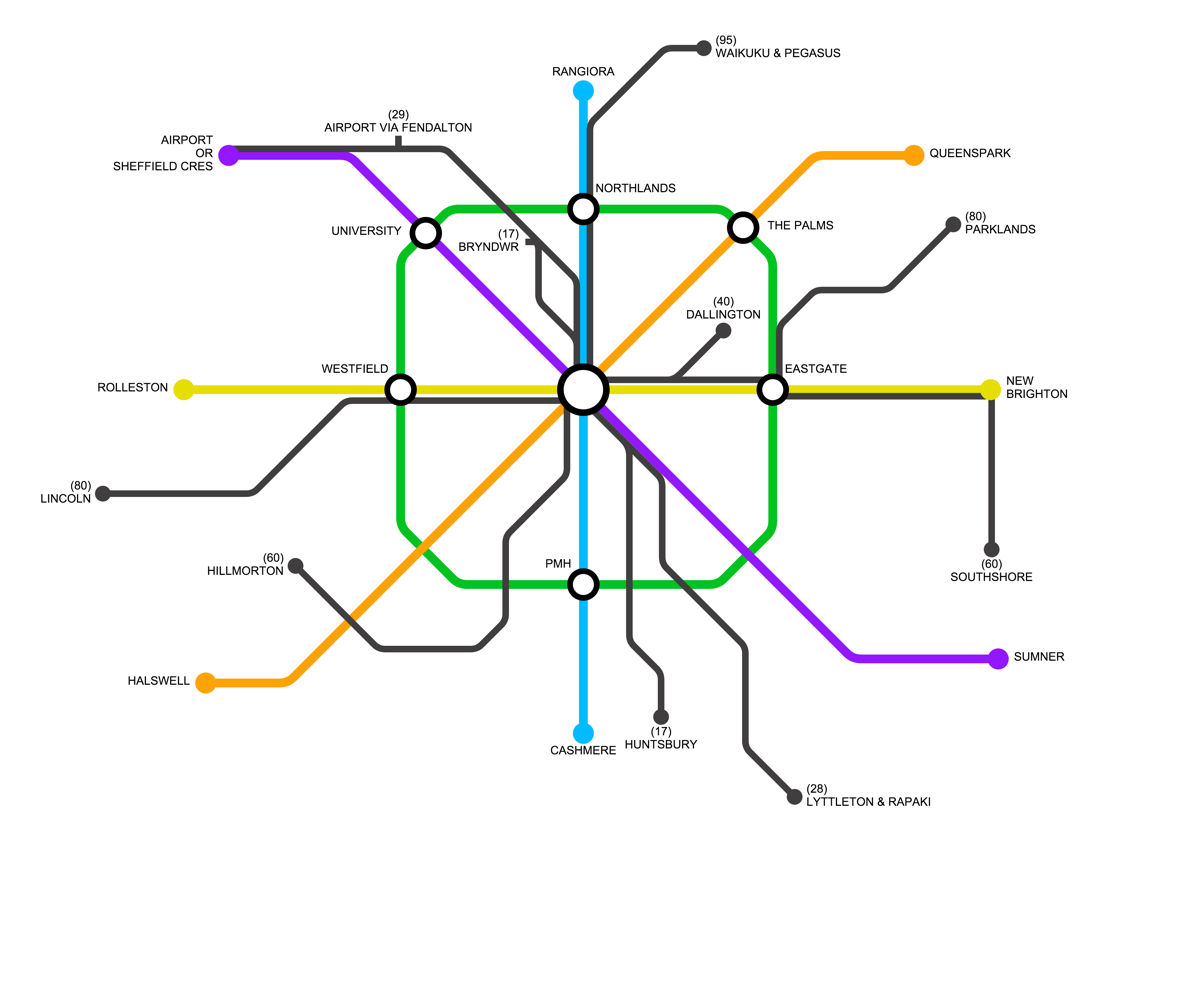
Oversimplified map of the Christchurch Metro Network

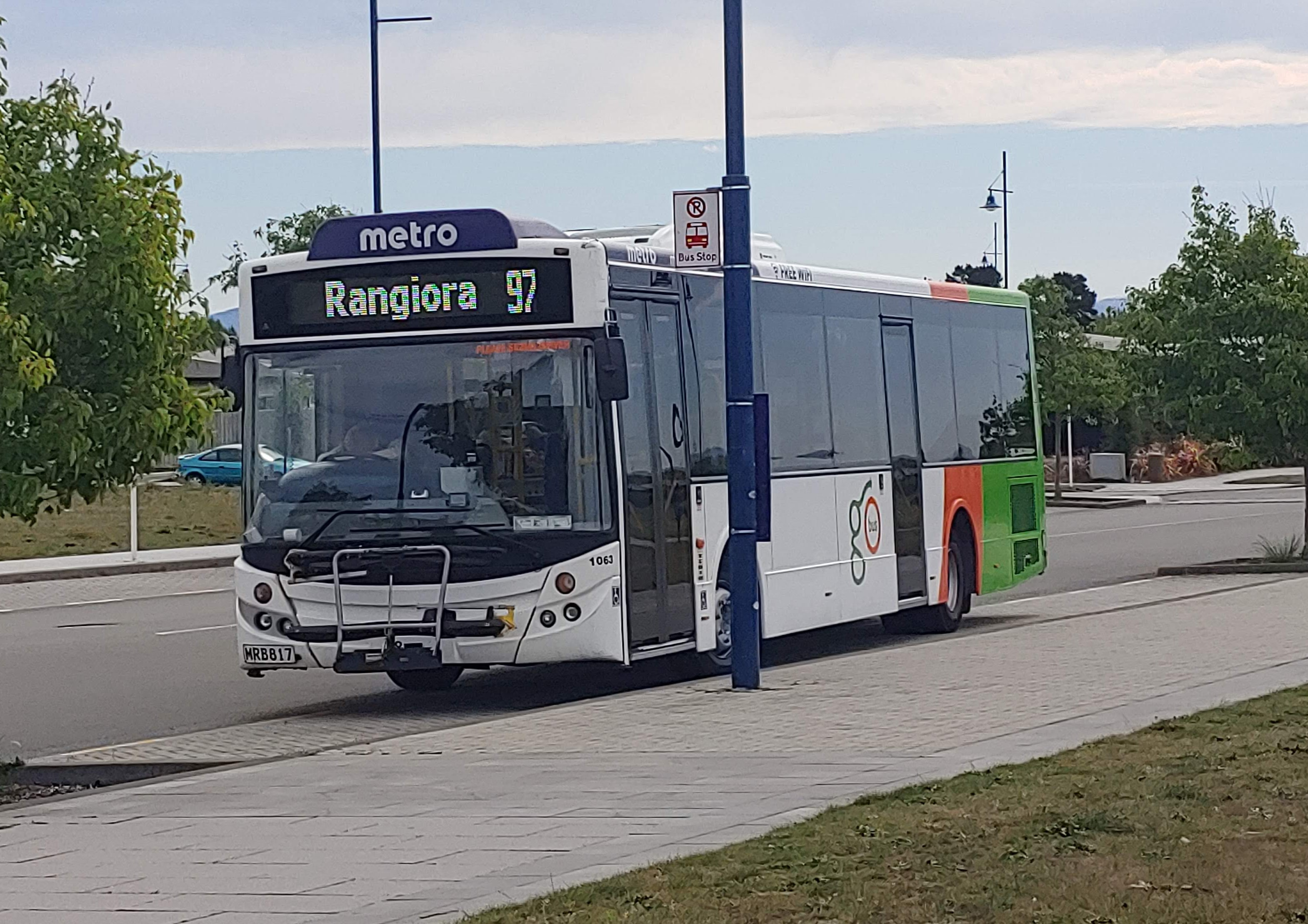
New route 97 at the Pegasus terminus. 5 October 2020

On 8 December 2014, a new bus network was launched offering three types of bus services. Five colour-coded frequent bus routes (the High Frequency Services) run through Christchurch's major road corridors, connecting people to popular destinations.

In September 2020 it was announced that the colour-coded line branding will be discontinued, with lines reverting to their routes number. The Blue Line group became routes 1 and 1x on 28 September, the rest changed over in November 2020.

In September 2023, the new Route 8 and Route 27 services were introduced, replacing the previous Route 17 and Route 28 services.

City Connectors (buses with two numbers, not including route 97) allow people to travel from outer suburbs and satellite towns direct to the city.

Suburban Links (buses with three numbers and also route 97) allow people to travel between inner suburbs, while avoiding the central city. People wanting to go to the Bus Interchange would need to transfer onto another bus at transfer points, located throughout the city.

The following services are operated under the Metro brand:

=== High frequency services ===
#	Route Name	Start	Major destinations	End	Notes
Or	Orbiter	Eastgate Mall	St Martins Shops, Princess Margaret Hospital, Barrington Mall, Riccarton Mall, Canterbury University, Northlands Mall, The Palms Mall	Eastgate Mall	
1	Rangiora – Cashmere	Princess Margaret Hospital or Cashmere	Sydenham Shops, Bus Interchange, Bealey Ave, Northlands Mall	Belfast or Rangiora via Kaiapoi	
1x	Rangiora – City Express	Ara Institute	Bus Interchange, Bealey Ave, Northlands Mall, Belfast, Kaiapoi	Rangiora	Weekdays only
3	Airport/Sheffield Crescent – Sumner	Airport or Sheffield Crescent	Avonhead Mall, Canterbury University, Riccarton Mall, Chch Hospital, Bus Interchange, Ara Institute, Ferrymead Shops	Sumner	
5	Rolleston/New Brighton	The Hub Hornby or Rolleston via Templeton	Church Corner, Riccarton Mall, Chch Hospital, Bus Interchange, Fitzgerald Ave, Eastgate Mall	New Brighton	
5x	Rolleston/New Brighton	Rolleston	Templeton, Hornby Hub, Church Corner, Riccarton Mall, Chch Hospital, Bus Interchange	Ara Institute	Weekdays only
7	Halswell/Queenspark	Halswell	Addington, Chch Hospital, Bus Interchange, The Palms Mall, Burwood Hospital	Queenspark	
8	Port to Port (Airport to Lyttelton)	Airport	Wairakei Rd, Rossall St, Bus Interchange, Ara Institute (every 30 min), Opawa, Heathcote	Lyttelton Wharf	Some trips extend to Rapaki

=== City Connector services ===
#	Route Name	Start	Major destinations	End	Notes
27	Northwood – Huntsbury	Northwood	Casebrook, Bishopdale Mall, Northlands Mall, Colombo St, Bus Interchange, Moorhouse Ave, St Martins Shops	Huntsbury	
29	Airport – City via Fendalton	Bus Interchange	Fendalton	Airport	
44	Shirley – Westmorland	Dallington	The Palms Mall, Shirley, Warrington St Shops, Bus Interchange, Sydenham Shops, Barrington Mall,	Westmorland	
60	Hillmorton – Southshore	Wigram	Aidanfield, Hillmorton, Barrington Mall, Chch Hospital, Bus Interchange, The Palms Mall, Travis Rd, New Brighton	Southshore	
80	Lincoln – Parklands	Lincoln University	Lincoln Town, Prebbleton, Riccarton Mall, Chch Hospital, Bus Interchange, Eastgate Mall	Parklands	
81	Lincoln – City Direct	Lincoln University	Lincoln Town, Prebbleton, Chch Hospital, Bus Interchange	Ara Institute of Canterbury	Weekdays only. Express route. No set route.
85	Rolleston – City (non-stop)	Rolleston	Rolleston, Chch Hospital, Bus Interchange, Ara Institute	Ara Institute of Canterbury	Weekdays only. Express route. No set route.
86	Darfield – City	Darfield	Darfield, Kirwee, West Melton, Westfield Riccarton, Bus Interchange, Manchester Street Superstop	Manchester Street Superstop	Weekdays only. Express route.
91	Rangiora – City Direct	Northern Park and Ride (River Rd)	Central Park and Ride (White St), Southern Park and Ride (South Belt), Bus Interchange	Christchurch Hospital	Express route. No set route. Weekdays only.
92	Kaiapoi – City Direct	Kaiapoi Central Park and Ride	Kaiapoi Southern Park and Ride, Bus Interchange	Christchurch Hospital	Express route. No set route. Weekdays only.
95	Pegasus – City	Pegasus	Woodend, Kaiapoi, Belfast, Northlands, Bealey Ave, Bus Interchange	Ara Institute of Canterbury	
95x	Pegasus and Waikuku – City Express	Pegasus or Waikuku Beach	Woodend, Kaiapoi, Belfast, Northlands, Bealey Ave, Bus Interchange	Ara Institute of Canterbury	1 trip from Waikuku to City, 2 return trips. Weekdays only.

=== Suburban Link services ===
#	Route Name	Start	Major destinations	End	Notes
97	Rangiora – Pegasus	Rangiora	Woodend	Pegasus	Only double digit numbered suburban link route.
100	Wigram – The Palms	Halswell	Wigram, Church Corner, Canterbury University, Riccarton Mall, Merivale Mall	The Palms Mall	
107	Styx Mill – Northlands Mall	Northwood Supa Centa	Northwood, Willowbank Wildlife Reserve, Styx Mill, Veitches Road	Northlands Mall	
110	New Brighton – The Palms	New Brighton	Aranui, Wainoni	The Palms	
120	Burnside – Spreydon	Sheffield Crescent	Burnside, Canterbury University, Riccarton Mall, Addington, Spreydon	Barrington Mall	
125	Redwood – Westlake	Redwood	Northlands Mall, Bishopdale Mall, Airport, Avonhead Mall, Hornby Hub, Westlake	Halswell	
130	Hei Hei – Avonhead	Hornby Hub	Heihei, Church Corner, Riccarton Mall, Canterbury University, Avonhead Mall	Burnside High School	
135	New Brighton – The Palms	New Brighton	New Brighton, Taiora QE II, Burwood Hospital, Prestons, The Palms	The Palms	No sunday service.
140	Russley – Mt Pleasant	Hornby Hub	Russley, Church Corner, Westfield Riccarton, Moorhouse Ave, Eastgate Mall, Ferrymead Shops	Mt Pleasant	
155	Lyttelton – Eastgate (Shopper Service)	Lyttelton Wharf	Lyttelton Wharf, Ferrymead, Tannery, Eastgate Mall	Eastgate Mall	3 weekday trips only.
820	Burnham – Lincoln	Burnham	Izone Business Park, Rolleston, Springston, Lincoln University	Lincoln Anglican Church	

=== Bikes on buses ===
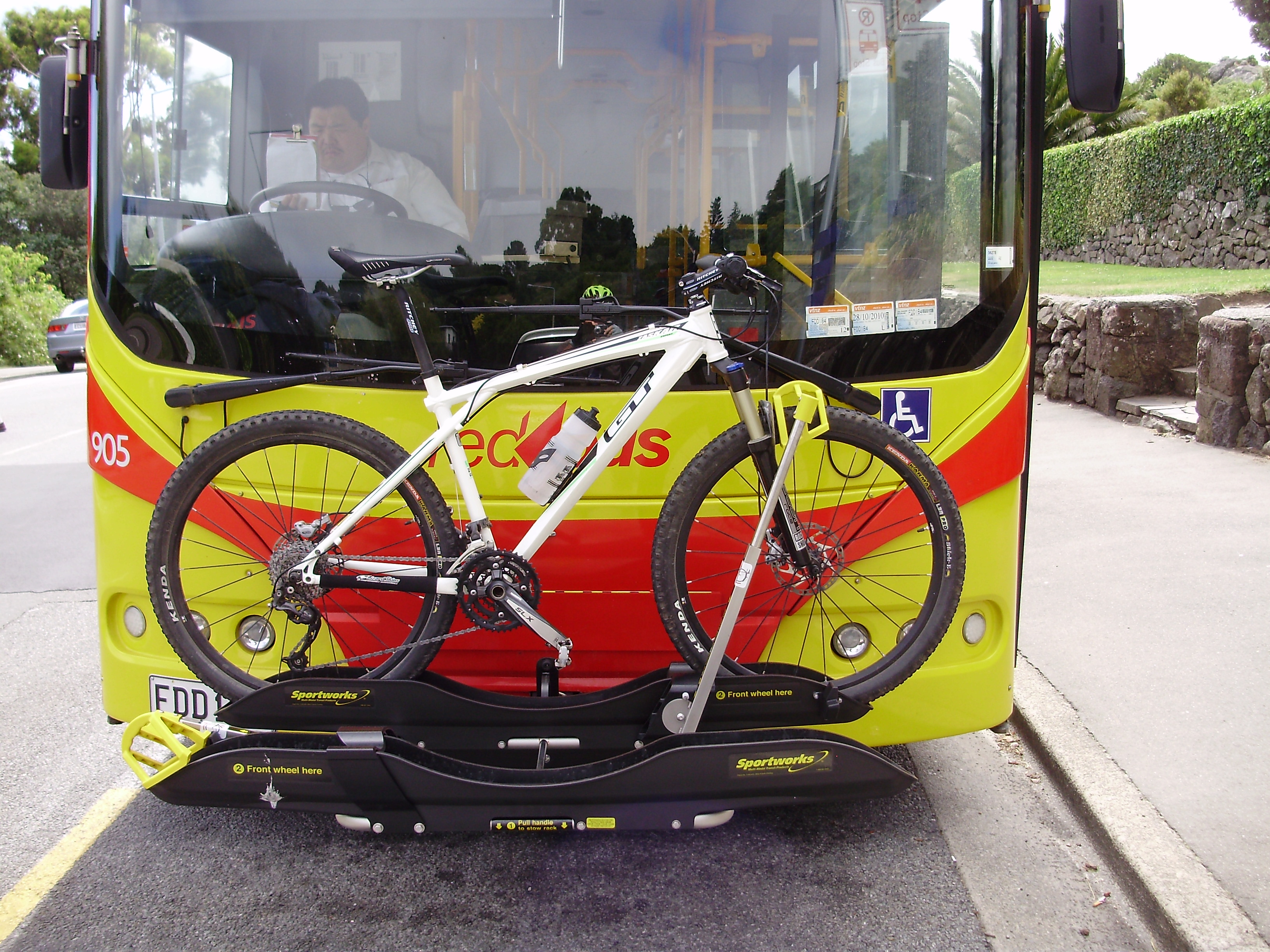
Sportworks double bicycle carrier mounted on a Redbus

Christchurch was the first place in New Zealand where bikes were carried on suburban buses. The trial started in November 2007 on the 35 route to Heathcote. Bike racks on buses are provided on all suburban services.

== Future ==
=== PT Futures ===
In 2020, a plan for future improvements to the Metro Network, promising services as frequent as every 7.5 minutes, was proposed.

In 2023, the government announced $78m of funding would be provided to improve public transport in Greater Christchurch, which would accelerate the Greater Christchurch Public Transport Futures (PT Futures) programme over five to six years, about half the time originally anticipated.

In 2024, the government re-allocated funding originally assigned to accelerate these improvements to other transport projects – an upgrade for Brougham Street, and a second bridge for Ashburton.

=== Mass Rapid Transit (MRT) ===
A Mass Rapid Transit line from Belfast to Hornby via the Central City has been proposed, with an indicative business case already complete as of 2023.

However, as of 2024, funding for a further, more detailed business case, was removed by NZ Transport Agency Waka Kotahi, and was passed back to the Christchurch City Council as the lead agency.

In June 2025, the proposed Mass Rapid Transit project was included in the Te Waihanga Infrastructure Commission’s draft National Infrastructure Plan, following a successful joint submission by New Zealand Transport Agency Waka Kotahi and the Christchurch City Council, as part of the Greater Christchurch Partnership. While this does not guarantee funding or political support, it was deemed it to be of national importance by meeting New Zealand’s strategic objectives, being good value for money, and capable of being successfully delivered.

=== Motu Move ===
Metrocards and Cash payment methods are planned to be replaced by the new national ticketing system, Motu Move.

In December 2024, a pilot was launched for the Route 29 to Christchurch Airport, with passengers being able to pay an adult fare using contactless credit or debit cards, and mobile payment technologies such as Google Pay and Samsung Pay.

The first phase of Motu Move was officially launched on 10 November 2025, allowing for passengers to pay a standard adult fare using contactless cards or mobile devices, alongside existing Metrocard or cash payment options.

Prepaid Motu Move cards are expected to be available from mid-2026, replacing Metrocard.

As of late-2026 Motu Move cards are available, Metro is also advertising Muto Move on buses starting in October.

== Other transport services ==
=== Taxis ===
There are a variety of taxi operators active in Christchurch. Operations are regulated by the New Zealand Transport Agency.

=== Airport transport ===
Christchurch International Airport is served by buses and shuttle vans.

- Four bus routes are available from the airport bus stand located outside the International Arrivals Terminal;
  - 3 Airport or Sheffield Crescent to Sumner
  - 8 Port to Port (Airport to Lyttelton)
  - 29 City to Airport via Fendalton
  - 125 Redwood to Westlake
- Shuttle vans provided by several operators, including most taxi companies, provide door-to-door transport to and from the Airport.

=== Diamond Harbour ferry ===
A ferry connects the suburb of Lyttelton to Diamond Harbour, a settlement on the opposite side of Lyttelton Harbour. Ferries first began crossing Lyttelton Harbour in 1888. The ferry is operated by Black Cat Ltd. Connection provided with metro routes 8 and 155.

=== Christchurch Tramway ===
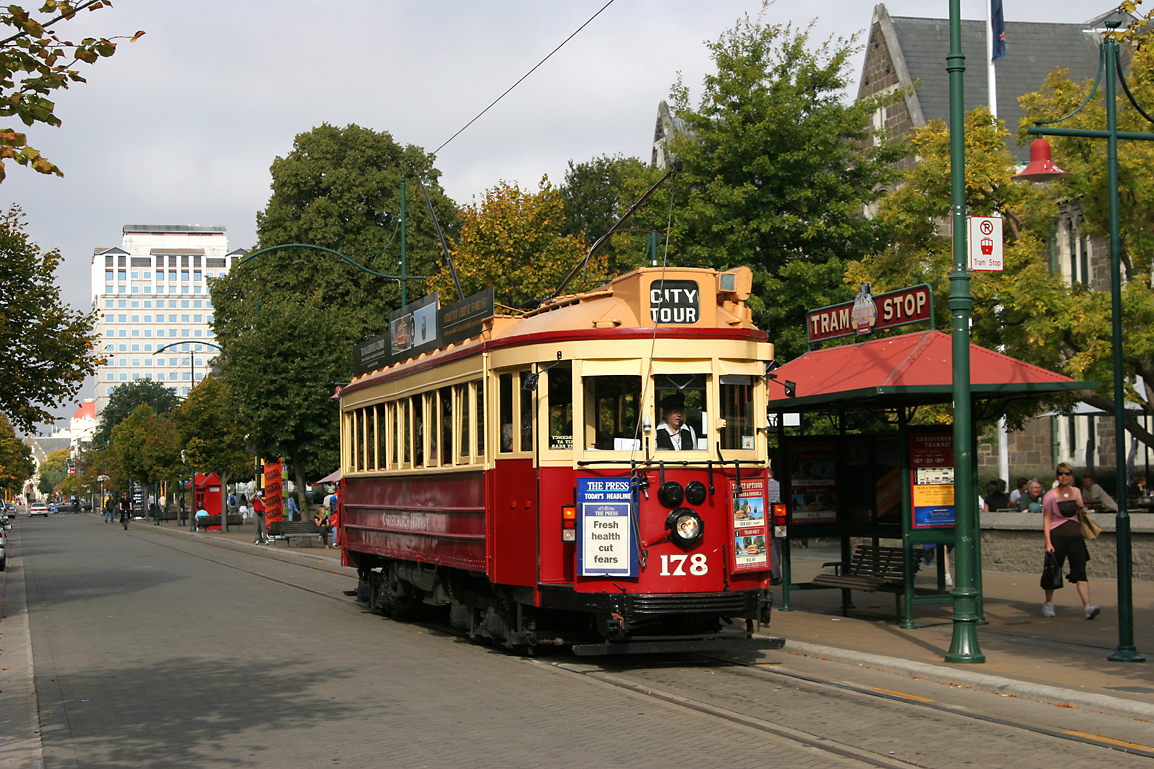
Christchurch Brill Tram No 178 on the heritage tramway

Christchurch Tramway Ltd operates a one-way tram circuit of the central city. This is mainly marketed as a tourist attraction, but is available to local commuters with an annual season ticket. Trams were originally introduced to Christchurch in 1905, ceased operating in 1954, and returned to the newly built inner city loop in 1995, mainly as a tourist attraction.

Preliminary investigation into light rail options for Christchurch was made in 2009. Investigating options and protecting possible routes is an action point in the City Council's "A City for People Action Plan" (approved in 2010).

=== Heavy rail ===
Commuter rail service was discontinued in the 1970s, while long distance rail travel (by KiwiRail) has been scaled back to just the Coastal Pacific and TranzAlpine services, which depart from the Christchurch Train Station in Addington.

In May 2014, an article on the website Stuff.co.nz stated that the Templeton Residents' Association had urged Christchurch City Council to consider the implementation of a local commuter rail network for the city. In an article dated August 2014, it was subsequently confirmed that the city council were to discuss the possibility with the NZ Transport Agency.
