= Christchurch City Holdings =

New Zealand holding company

Christchurch City Holdings Ltd
- Company type: Council holdings company
- Industry: various
- Headquarters: Christchurch, New Zealand
- Area served: Canterbury region
- Key people: Paul Munro (CEO)
- Owner: Christchurch City Council
- Website: www.cchl.co.nz

Christchurch City Holdings Ltd (CCHL) is a wholly owned investment arm of the Christchurch City Council. The council controlled trading organisations (CCTO) own and run several key pieces of infrastructure in Christchurch, such as electricity delivery and fibre broadband.

== History ==
In his role as Christchurch City councillor, Philip Carter took a part in establishing Christchurch City Holdings in 1993. He was the group's founding chairperson.

== Organisations owned by CCHL ==
CCHL owns or part-owns the following eight companies.

=== Lyttelton Port Company ===
The Lyttelton Port Company is the management of the main port in the South Island at Lyttelton, New Zealand. It services the city's businesses as the seaport. By June 2012, CCHL ownership had increased to 79.3%.

=== Christchurch International Airport ===
Christchurch International Airport. 75% owned by CCHL.

=== City Care ===
City Care is the City Council's infrastructure management company. They have branches throughout New Zealand and service many councils and businesses. 100% owned by CCHL. After the collapse of construction company Mainzeal, City Care hired their management team. In early 2013, City Care would consider expanding operations to include vertical construction, with the company eventually doing so. In November 2015, Christchurch City Council announced that it had decided to sell City Care. After a sales process left only one offer on the table, the city council decided in August 2016 that it would keep City Care. The sale of City Care was a notable issue in the 2016 Christchurch mayoral election.

=== Orion ===
Orion is an electricity distribution company, that owns and operates the network in the central Canterbury area. It covers the area between the Waimakariri and Rakaia rivers and from the Canterbury Coast to Arthur's Pass. 89.3% owned by CCHL.

=== Selwyn Plantation Board ===
Selwyn Plantation Board operates in forestry and farming. 39.32% owned by CCHL, but the company is in the process of being wound up (it is selling its assets and the proceeds will be distributed to the two shareholding council holding companies). A final payment to CCHL is expected in 2013.

=== Enable Networks ===
Enable Networks builds and runs a new fibre optic network in Christchurch. Enable Networks was first launched in 2007 with funding from CCHL and a grant from the Ministry of Economic Development. Initially launched as Christchurch City Networks Limited (CCNL), in 2009 the company re-branded as Enable Networks. The company is the Crown's partner for its Ultra-Fast Broadband initiative. 100% owned by CCHL.

=== Red Bus ===
Red Bus was one of the public transport operators in Christchurch. It was 100% owned by CCHL. On 4 November 2020 it was announced that Red Bus's operations and assets had been sold to Ritchies Transport Holdings Ltd for an undisclosed sum with completion expected in early December.

=== Ecocentral Ltd ===
The newest company is Ecocentral Ltd, which operates council's recycling. It is 100% owned by CCHL.
