= Statue of James Cook, Christchurch =

Statue in Christchurch, New Zealand

Cook Statue
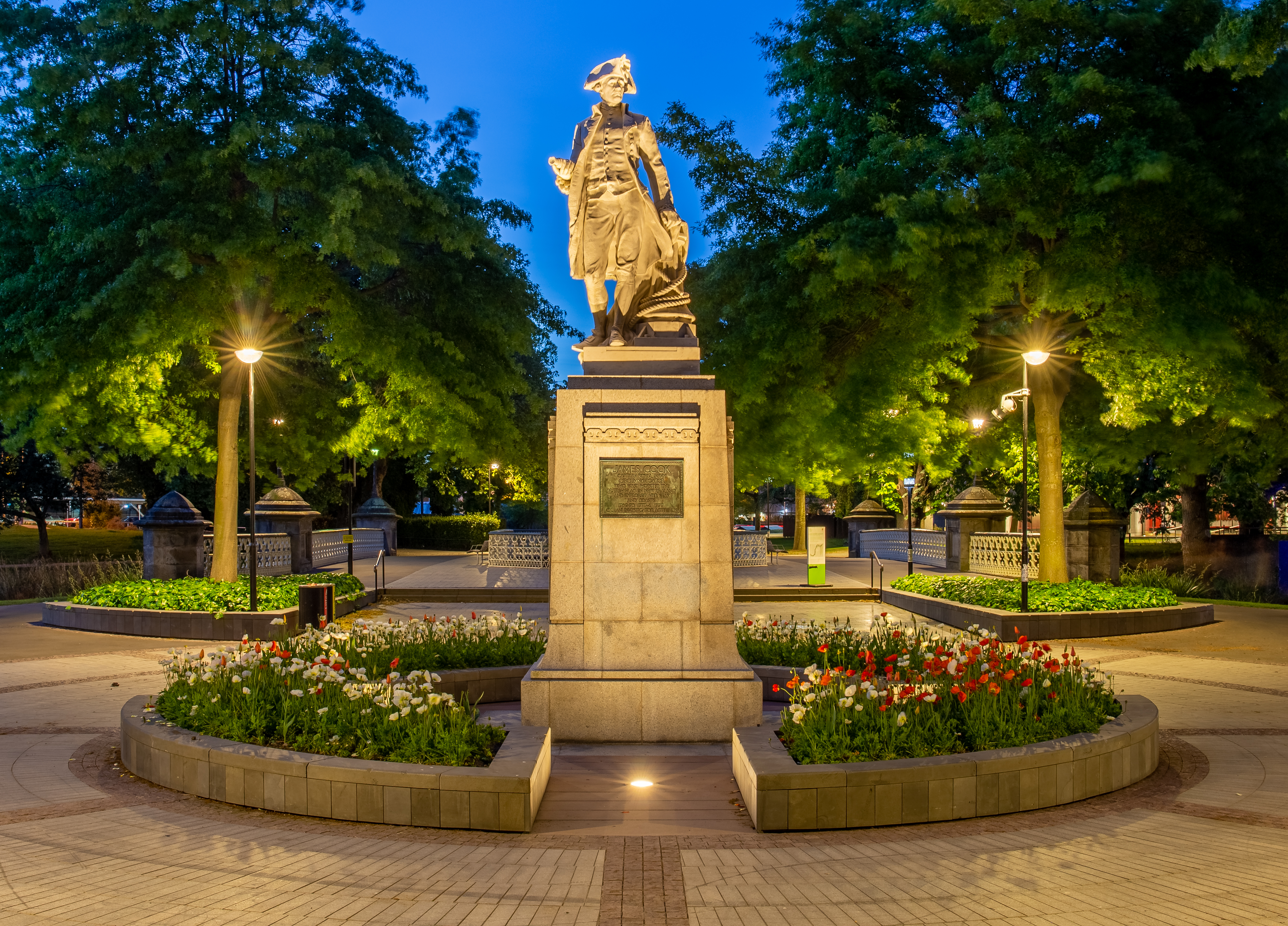
- Artist: William Trethewey
- Year: 1932
- Type: Carrara marble
- Location: Christchurch, New Zealand; 43°31′40.9″S 172°38′8.1″E
- Owner: Christchurch City Council

The Cook Statue in Victoria Square, Christchurch, commemorates the three journeys of James Cook to New Zealand. The statue was sculpted by William Trethewey and was unveiled on 10 August 1932 by the Governor-General, Lord Bledisloe. It was donated by bookmaker and philanthropist Matthew Barnett (1861–1935).

== History ==
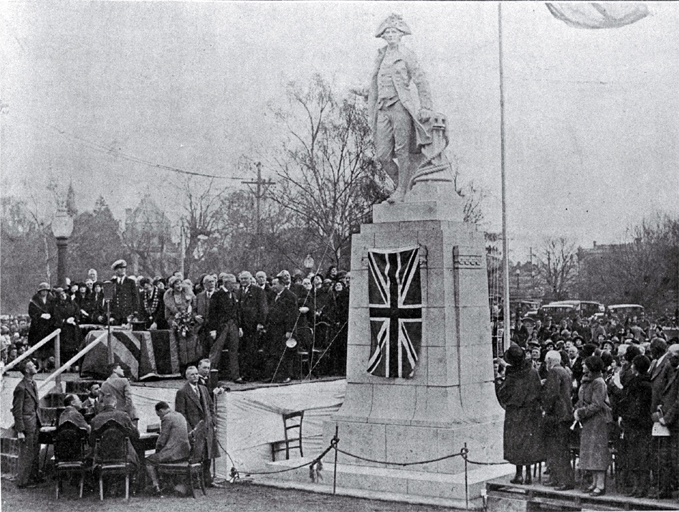
Cook Statue, unveiling

Matthew Barnett had become wealthy through his bookmaking business, which he conducted with his business partner Peter Grant. The 1890s in New Zealand, when the business flourished, need to be seen in the then climate of moral and social change in New Zealand. Women's suffrage, temperance and anti-betting were strong movements, and gaming houses were banned, which included betting shops. Bookmakers responded to the situation by giving themselves titles like 'commission agents' and 'turf accountants'. At first, it was left to District and City Councils to pass by-laws, but eventually Parliament passed the Gaming Act in 1908, which imposed tight restrictions. A 1910 amendment to the Act banned bookmaking altogether.

Although wealthy, Barnett was not part of the high society, as he operated outside of what was socially acceptable by the upper class.

In 1928, Barnett funded an architectural competition for a statue commemorating the three journeys of James Cook to New Zealand. William Trethewey (1892–1956) won this competition and was chosen as the sculptor; this was his biggest commission in his career so far. A 12-ton block of Carrara marble was imported for this work. This commission brought Trethewey much publicity, including coverage on Movietone News.

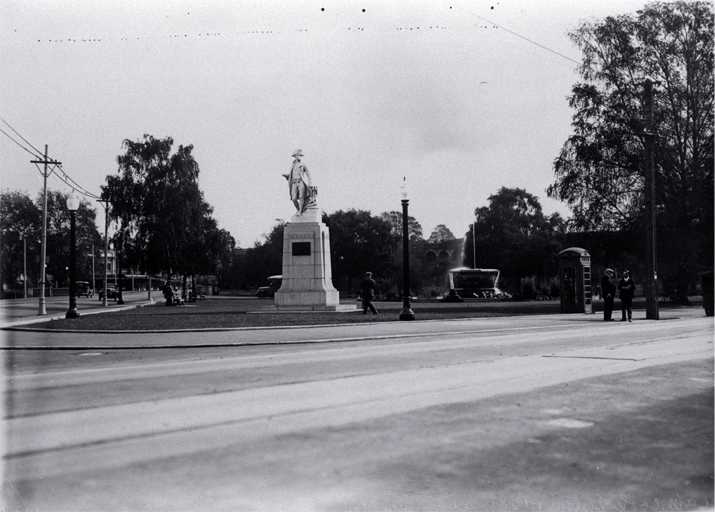
Cook Statue in Victoria Square in its original location at the junction of Colombo and Victoria Streets

At first, a grass plot on the north bank of the Avon River / Ōtākaro in Victoria Square, outside the Limes Hospital (84 Kilmore Street) was considered for the statue. The site of the Limes Hospital and the river bank is these days occupied by the Christchurch Town Hall, with the Limes Room commemorating the former hospital. But by late 1929, Barnett favoured a location on the corner of Armagh and Colombo Streets, in the south-east corner of Victoria Square.

In submitting to the Captain Cook Memorial Committee, a subcommittee of the Christchurch City Council's Parks Committee, Barnett argued that the statue would be visible from all directions in that location, and from Colombo Street, one could see it as far away from the south as Gloucester Street. This location is where the statue was originally placed. Barnett lived only three blocks north from Victoria Square in Wharetiki House at 854 Colombo Street.

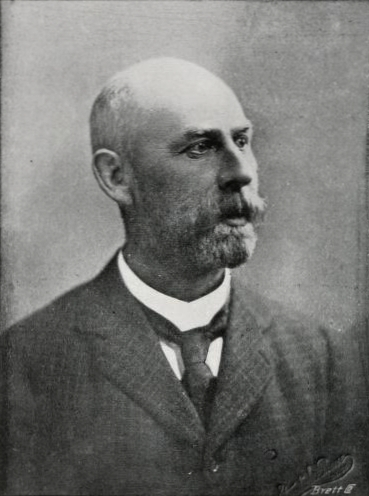
Matthew Barnett (benefactor)

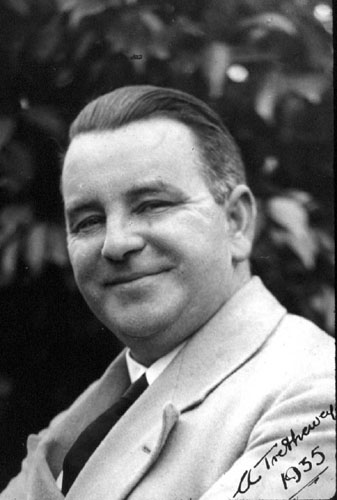
William Trethewey (sculptor)

Initially, Barnett gave £500 towards the necessary funds of the statue, with the rest of the funding to come from public subscription. But sometime later, he decided to fund the memorial fully, and gave an additional bond of £1,500 or "as much more or less as might be required" for the memorial.

Dan Sullivan, the Mayor of Christchurch and Member of Parliament representing the Avon electorate, was tasked with inviting the governor-general, Lord Bledisloe to the unveiling ceremony. This was successful, and the Cook Statue was unveiled on 10 August 1932 by Lord Bledisloe. In his speech, the Governor-General referred to early New Zealand history:

In the early history of New Zealand there are three outstanding landmarks—its effective discovery by James Cook, then a lieutenant in the Royal Navy, in 1769; its Christianisation, commencing with the arrival of Samuel Marsden in 1814; and its inclusion in the British Empire under the Treaty of Waitangi in 1840. But for the first, the second would have been improbable and the third impossible.

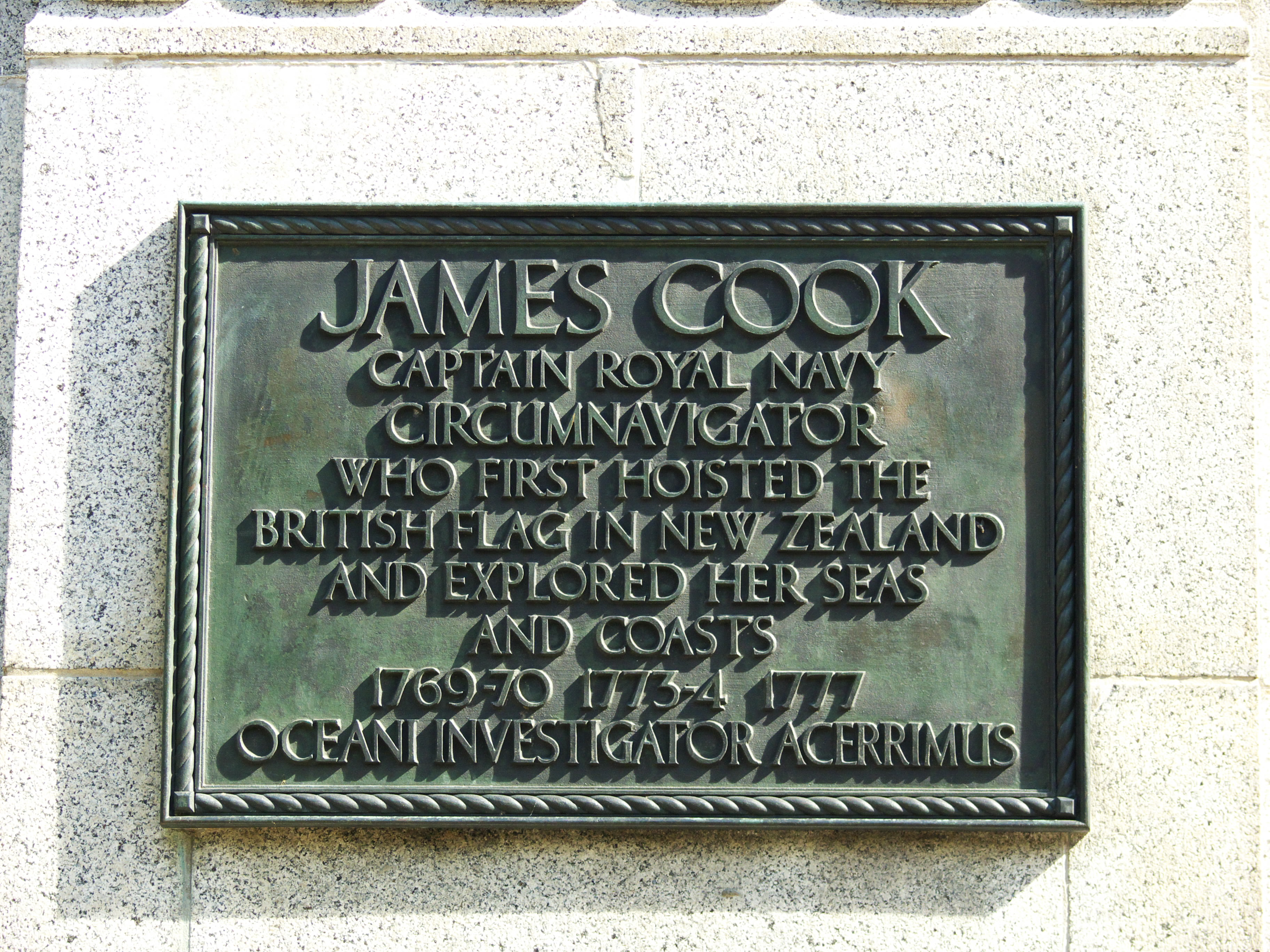
Plaque at Cook Statue

The mayor, a Labour MP, spoke next. He made reference to the humble beginnings of Cook as the son of a labourer, and having first been a common seaman. Sullivan spoke of the special interest that he has for the working class. Barnett then addressed the audience and made reference to the tough economic conditions, with New Zealand being affected by the Great Depression and many people suffering much distress. He explained that he made the gift of the statue three years ago when times had been much better. To that end, he presented the mayor with a cheque over 100 guineas for the Mayor's Fund.

The Cook Statue has two plaques. One lists Cook's journeys:

James Cook, Captain, Royal Navy, circumnavigator who first hoisted the British flag in New Zealand and explored her seas and coasts, 1769–70, 1773–4, 1777

The inscription on the second plaque reads: "Oceani investigator acerimus".

Barnett's wife Mary had died in 1931, before the statue was unveiled. Matthew Barnett died in January 1935, just over two years after unveiling of the statue. There are white marble chippings scattered on their grave, which are remnants from the production of the Cook Statue.

=== Relocation ===
In 1989, Victoria Square underwent considerable change. Victoria Street, which previously bisected the Square, was terminated at Kilmore Street, and the Crowne Plaza Hotel was built in the north-west corner of Victoria Square across the previous road. The Square itself got a new landscape design and in this process, the Cook Statue was relocated to its current more central position.

=== Recent history ===
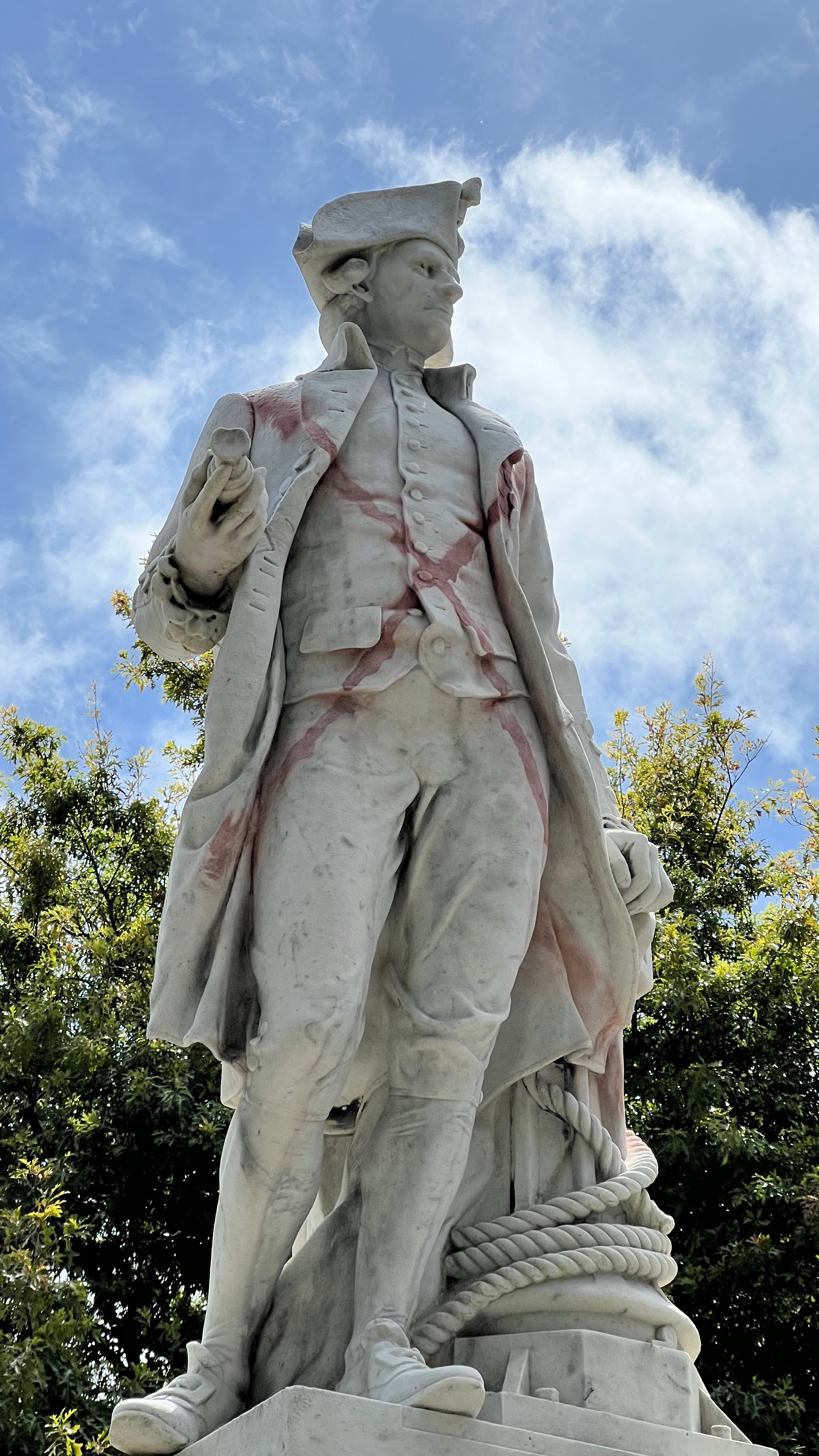
The defaced statue after cleaning and repair in February 2024. A red cross is still visible.

The statue survived the 2011 Christchurch earthquake with no significant damage. In 2024, the statue was defaced with red paint. A few nights later, the scaffolding erected to clean the statue was used to grind the nose off the statue. The vandalism was described as "politically motivated".

== Heritage registration ==
The Cook Statue is registered as a Category II heritage item by the New Zealand Historic Places Trust. It was registered on 26 November 1981 with registration number 1860. The statue is significant as an example of Trethewey's work, as one of the many memorials to Cook in New Zealand, and as a landmark in Victoria Square.
