= Matthew Barnett (bookmaker) =

New Zealand businessman (1859–1935)

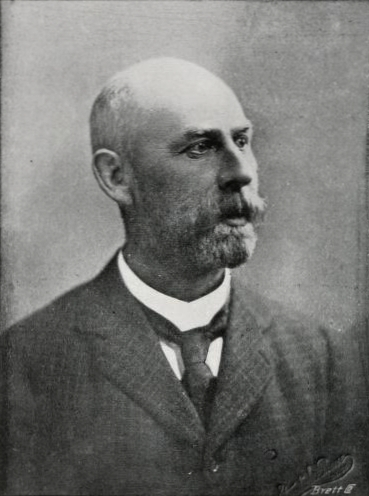
- Matthew Barnett in his 40s
- Born: 6 June 1859; Avoca, Victoria
- Died: 28 January 1935 (aged 75); Wharetiki, Christchurch
- Resting place: Bromley Cemetery, Christchurch
- Occupation: bookmaker
- Known for: Philanthropy
- Spouse: Mary Barnett (née Whelan)
- Children: six
- Relatives: Arthur Barnett (brother)

Matthew Frank Barnett (6 June 1859 – 28 January 1935), also known as Mat Barnett, was a bookmaker and philanthropist from Christchurch, New Zealand. In his retirement, he became well known in lawn bowls. He donated the statue of James Cook in Victoria Square to the city. His family dwelling, Wharetiki House, was a prominent landmark on Colombo Street in the Christchurch Central City until its demolition in July 2011, following a demolition order by the Canterbury Earthquake Recovery Authority.

== Early life ==
Matthew Barnett

Barnett was born in Aovca, Colony of Victoria, in 1859. He came from a large family and had ten siblings. His parents were William Barnett, a merchant, and Rachel Barnett (née Mitchell). The family moved to Dunedin, New Zealand when Matthew was six as his father was attracted by the goldfields. He left school aged 13 or 14 and had a very brief employment as a photographer's apprentice, but did not like that profession. Instead, he was apprenticed to newspapers, first the Otago Guardian and later the Otago Daily Times. He worked in that profession for about five years. For the next four years, he worked in farming in Otago and South Canterbury. When he came to Oamaru, he became the proprietor of the 'Star and Garter Billiard Rooms', where he had his first exposure to betting on horse races. He returned to Dunedin for some time.

From there, Barnett's family returned to Melbourne for another two years. He worked as a swagman in Australia and then had employment as a tram driver in Melbourne for several months. In Melbourne, he married Mary Bridget Barnett (née Whelan) on 18 July 1888.

Mary Barnett (née Whelan)

Mary's father James Whelan (1836–1908) immigrated to Castlemaine, Victoria from Ireland as a teenager. He married in 1858, but his wife died only ten months later. In 1862/63, James Whelan spent nine months on Otago goldfields during the Otago gold rush. He returned to Castlemaine and married Margaret Roughan in June 1863. They knew each other from Kilkishen, County Clare, Ireland and met in Melbourne by chance. Soon after, James returned to Otago, with Margaret following him later that year. Their first child, Mary, was born in Gabriel's Gully in ca 1864. The family moved to nearby Wetherstons and when the goldfields were exhausted (when Mary was twelve years old), the family moved to Dunedin.

Mary travelled to Melbourne to visit relatives of her parents. In that city, she married Matthew Frank Barnett.

Children

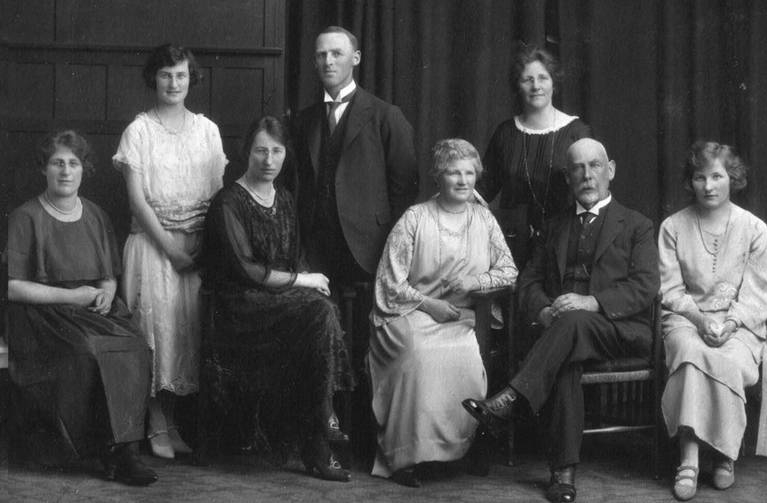
The Barnett family – standing from left: Tui, Olly, Ethel – sitting from left: Alice May (Topsy), Ivy, Mary (née Whelan), Matthew, Kate

The Barnetts had six children; five girls and one boy:

- Ethel Barnett (19 Apr 1889 – 4 Apr 1945)
- Matthew Oliver Barnett (Olly) (23 Mar 1890 – 14 July 1977)
- Ivy Kathleen Barnett (15 Oct 1891 – 1965)
- Alice May Barnett (Topsy) (15 May 1893 – 1979)
- Kate Elizabeth Barnett (19 Jan 1900 – 26 September 1972)
- Tui Frances Barnett (21 Dec 1903 – 12 Dec 1962)

== Professional life ==
Some time after their wedding, the couple moved to Otago to farm. Barnett's brother Thomas (Tom) had a business relationship with Peter Grant and they were placing racing bets together. Matthew Barnett joined them and for half a year, they worked together. After a substantial win, they dissolved their relationship and went on their own ways.

Bookmaking

Betting and bookmaking in the 1890s need to be seen in the then climate of moral and social change in New Zealand. Women's suffrage, temperance and anti-betting were strong movements, and gaming houses were banned, which included betting shops. Bookmakers responded to the situation by giving themselves titles like 'commission agents' and 'turf accountants'. Parliament was strongly lobbied by the pro-betting faction and consequently left decisions to the local level. Beginning with the Canterbury Trotting Club in 1897, racecourses responded by banning bookmakers from their properties. Those not adhering to the ban were being arrested and fined. Christchurch City Council passed a by-law in 1899 and banned bookmaking in public. Legislation was finally passed in 1908, banning gaming in public places and making it illegal for racing clubs to accept bets by telephone. An amendment to the Gaming Act in 1910 banned bookmaking altogether.

It was in this climate that Matthew Barnett formed a partnership 'Barnett and Grant'. It came about because Peter Grant had been banned from a racecourse for refusing to leave. Barnett, who had earlier been banned from the same course for life, but who had managed to get that decision overturned, offered to Grant to bet on a joint account. A win of £100 resulted and although the two never formalised their partnership, their further wins in this first year ran into the thousands. Luck left them, and after the second year they had lost all their earnings again. Luck was with them again, and some time after Grant's wedding in February 1896, they had sufficient capital to add a branch in Christchurch to their existing betting shop in Dunedin. Initially, the Dunedin business had to financially support the Christchurch branch, but under Barnett's business leadership in Christchurch, the situation changed and Christchurch supported the Dunedin branch. The Christchurch premises were in the central city at 174 Hereford Street, and from 1905 on the opposite side of the road at 163 Hereford Street.

Barnett and Grant were banned from racecourses, e.g. in Palmerston in 1892 and in Dunedin in 1894. They had frequent encounters with law enforcement, and they were arrested numerous times. Their Dunedin branch was searched by Police and Barnett, Grant and two employees arrested in September 1897. Between 1901 and 1904, they were arrested three times, including in January 1902, their Christchurch office was raided by Police, with the case going to court the following month. The case went to a jury trial, but all the witnesses refused to give evidence, as they would have incriminated themselves by doing so, as it was illegal to visit a gaming house. Without any witness statements, the jury delivered a not guilty verdict. For a 1906 raid of the Christchurch office, the Police had previously sent an undercover agent to the office to place a bet in order to have some evidence for a court case.

In 1909, Barnett was convicted of having published horse betting details in his publication Daylight that violated the Gaming Act 1908. He appealed the conviction and it was overturned by Justice Sim as being erroneous in point of law. With the passing of the 1910 amendment to the Gaming Act, Barnett decided to officially retire as a bookmaker, but it is likely that he continued to work underground.

Barnett's weekly sport magazine Daylight was taken over by The Press.

Arthur Barnett's

Barnett's younger brother had been apprenticed as a draper. In 1903, he established a drapery store Arthur Barnett in Dunedin. Matthew Barnett guaranteed a £900 loan to get the business going. It developed into the leading drapery store in Otago. Matthew Barnett retained a business interest and became chair of the board. At his death, his son Olly took that role, and he in turn passed the chairmanship to his son Gary. The Arthur Barnett department store developed into a national chain. At its peak in the 1980s, it had 19 stores and 1,200 employees.

== Wharetiki House ==
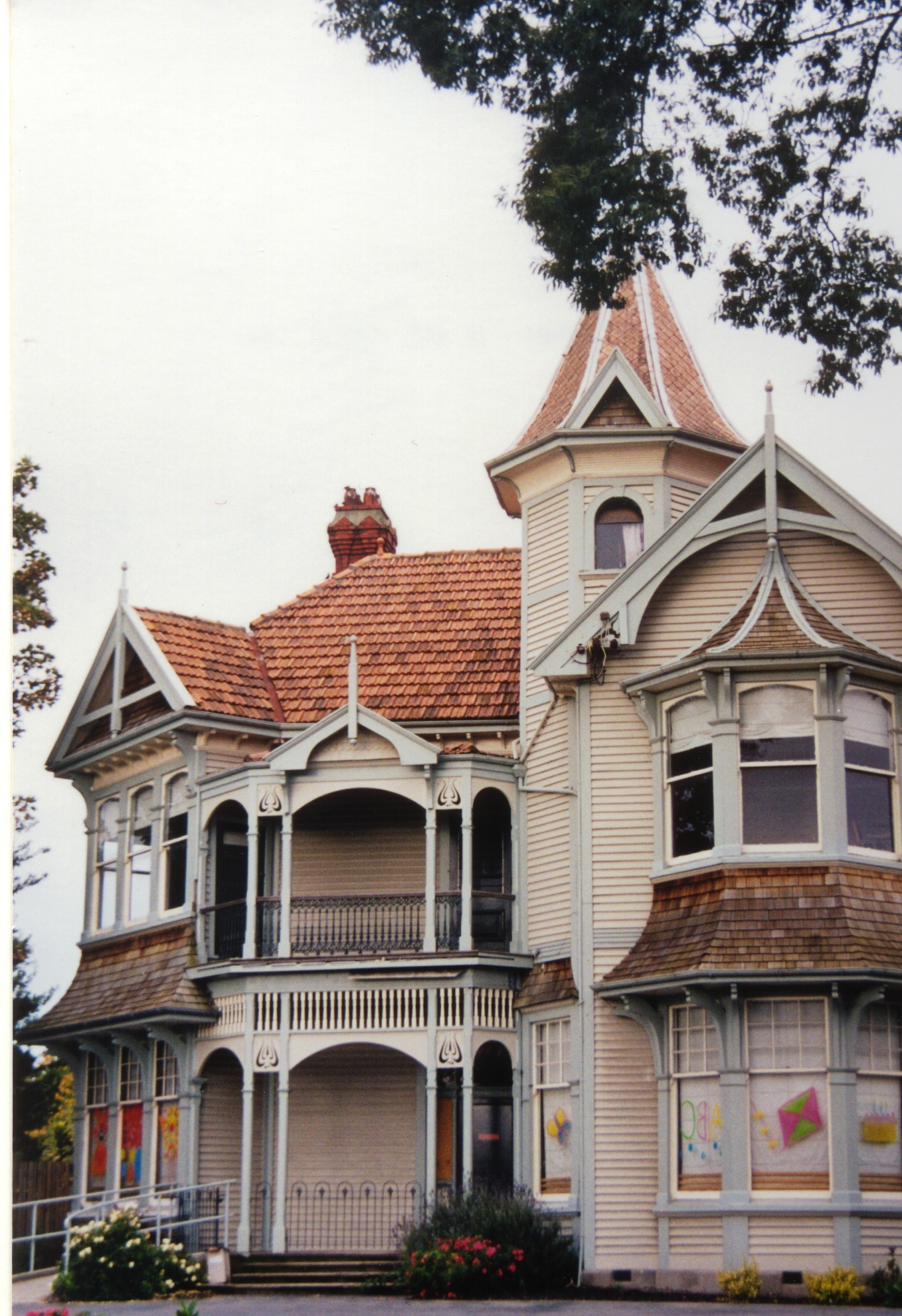
Wharetiki in the early 2000s

In 1901, Barnett bought a large section in the Christchurch central city, fronting onto Salisbury and Colombo Streets. A large family home, which he named Wharetiki, was built by 1904. The address was 854 Colombo Street, and his friend and business partner Peter Grant had a house built nearby at 901 Colombo Street two years later. Wharetiki was a large and representative dwelling, displaying the wealth of its owner. It had several servants and Mary Barnett's unmarried younger sister Maria (known as Polly) was in charge of them.

Mary's father suffered a brain injury in 1888 and spent the remaining 20 years of his life at Seacliff Mental Hospital. When he died in 1908, his wife Margaret and the children who were still at home moved to a different house in Dunedin, but later on she and her second youngest child, Bill, moved to Christchurch to live at Wharetiki. Margaret Whelan made many spontaneous trips back to Dunedin when she got nostalgic and would stay there for a few weeks at a time, but she would otherwise live at Wharetiki for the rest of her life.

Mary Barnett fell ill in 1930 and was confined to a wheel chair. The back stairs of Wharetiki House were replaced with a lift at that stage, so that she could move around the house.

After Matthew Barnett's death, the remaining family members put the house up for auction in May 1935. It existed until 2011, when it was demolished after suffering significant damage in the February 2011 Christchurch earthquake. Wharetiki House was registered by the New Zealand Historic Places Trust as a Category II heritage building.

== Philanthropy ==
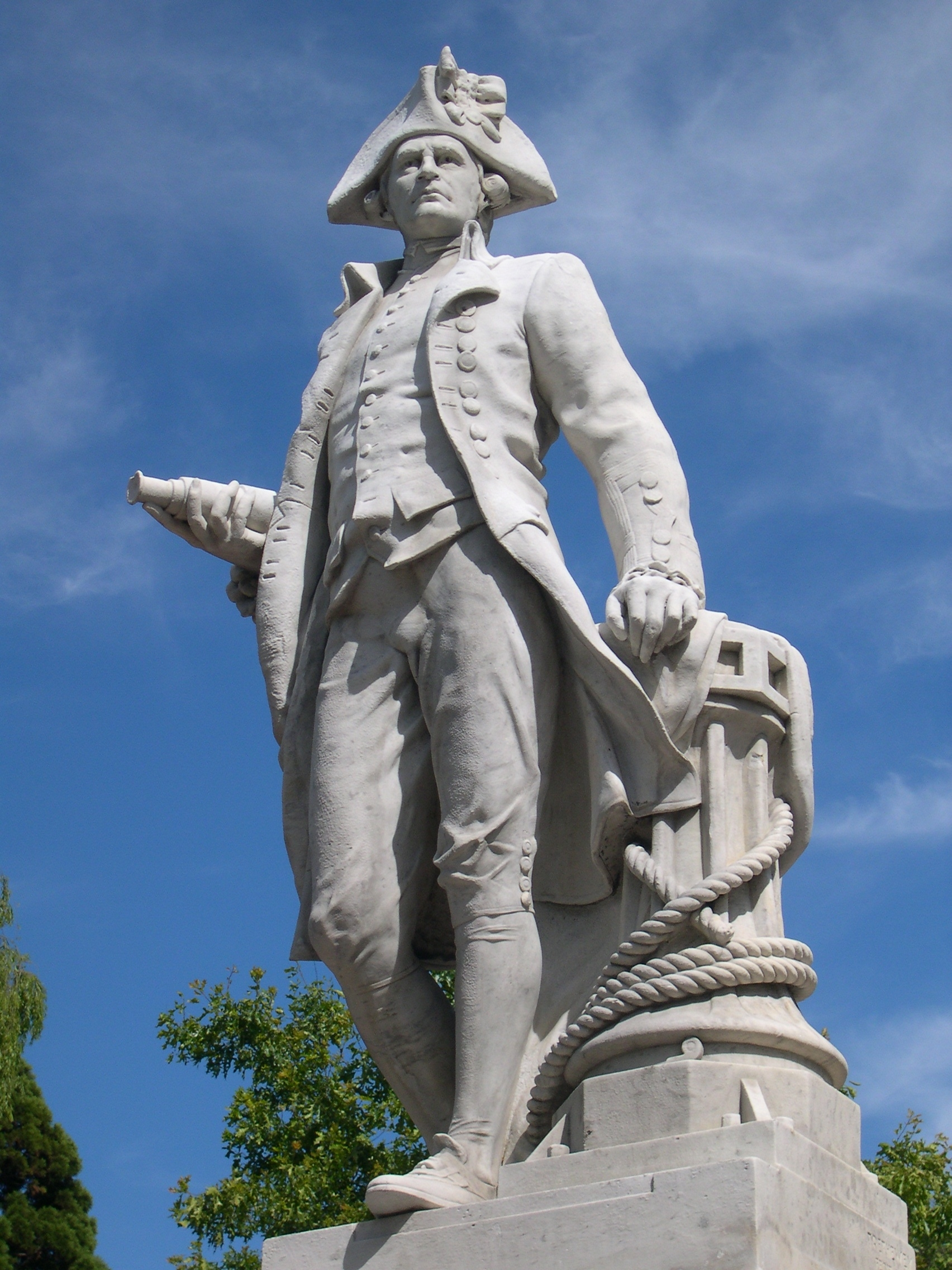
Statue of Captain Cook in Victoria Square, Christchurch

On journeys from Christchurch to Dunedin, Barnett would throw half-crowns to the swagmen working on the roads, as he would remember the hard times that he had when he worked on the roads in Victoria.

Cook Statue

In 1928, Barnett funded an architectural competition for a statue commemorating the three journeys of James Cook to New Zealand. William Trethewey (1892–1956) won this competition and was chosen as the sculptor; this was his biggest commission in his career so far. A 12-ton block of Carrara marble was imported for this work. Barnett also funded the sculpture itself, which was unveiled on 10 August 1932 in Victoria Square by the Governor-General, Lord Bledisloe. This commission brought Trethewey much publicity, including coverage on Movietone News. The Cook Statue is registered as a Category II heritage item by Heritage New Zealand.

Barnett Tiki

In his retirement, Barnett had started to play lawn bowls, and he became well known both as a player and administrator. In bowling circles, he was known as Mat Barnett. The Canterbury Bowling Club was only 100 m down the road on Salisbury Street. Since the early 1900s, Canterbury and Wellington had an annual competition. In 1924, Barnett commissioned a tiki as a trophy for this tournament and he personally supervised the carving. The mahogany carving was presented at the Canterbury Bowling Club in February 1925. The first annual competition with the Barnett Tiki was held a few days later in Wellington and was won by Christchurch. Whilst it was decided that the winning team should hold the Tiki until the next competition, the trophy was left in Wellington after the first competition in 1925. Mat Barnett's bowling trophy should not be confused with another trophy also established by a prominent Christchurch bowling club figure in the Christchurch area. William (Willie) Barnett, a pharmacist who was involved in the Christchurch Bowling Club for decades and was president for a period, established The Friendly Bowl trophy in 1906. The two Barnetts would sometimes be on opposing teams during inter-club matches.

== Death ==
Margaret Whelan died on 24 February 1926 at Wharetiki, aged 89. She was buried at Bromley Cemetery in block number 27. Mary Barnett died on 1 March 1931 at Wharetiki, aged 66. She was buried at Bromley Cemetery in block number 24 in plot 1 two days later. Matthew Barnett died on 28 January 1935, aged 75, also at Wharetiki. He was buried next to his wife the following day. There are white marble chippings scattered on their grave, which are remnants from the production of the Cook Statue.

Through his will, Matthew Barnett left £35,000 to his brother Arthur as a guarantee for his business.
