= Colombo Street =

Main road in Christchurch, New Zealand

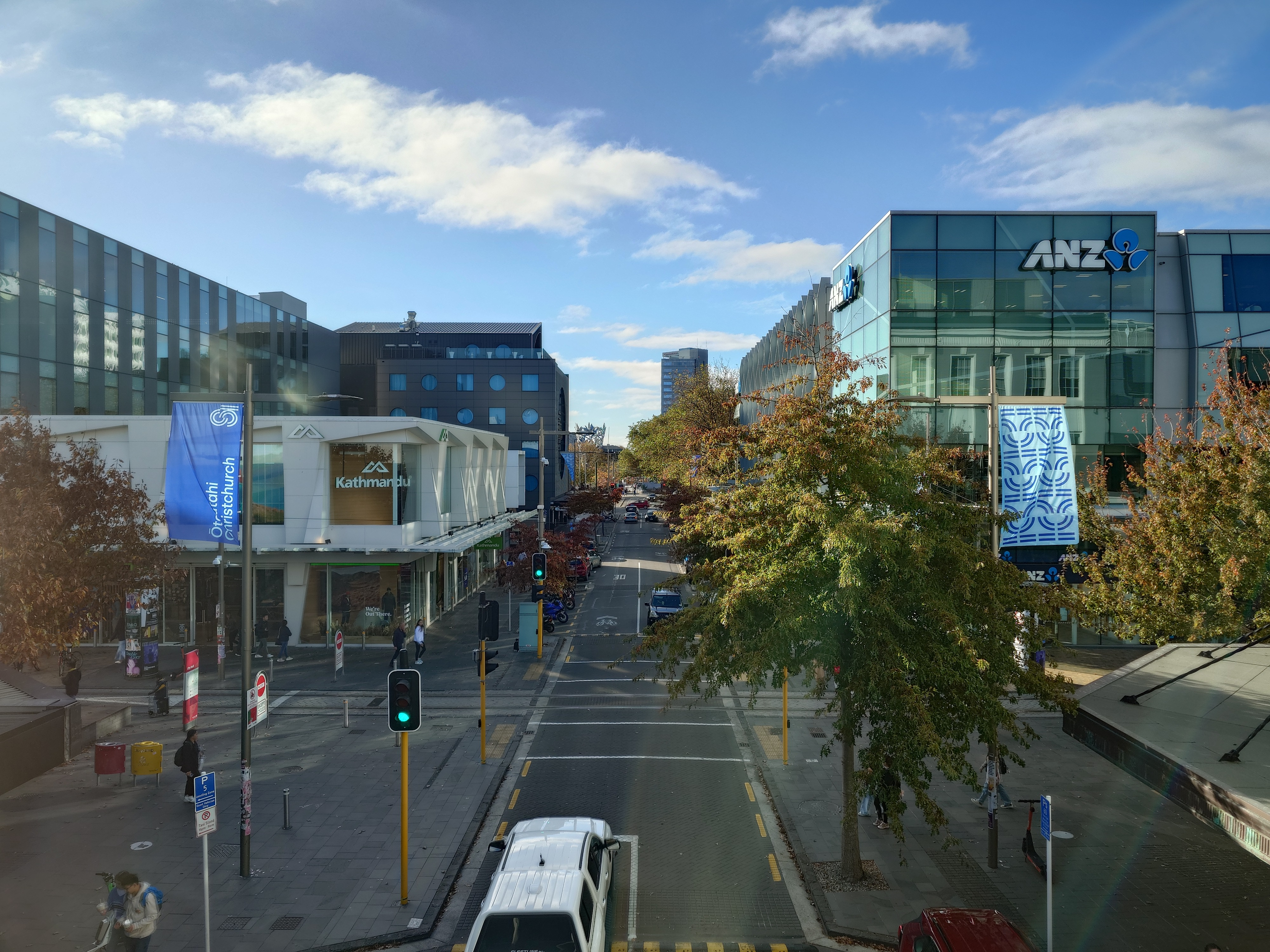
- Colombo Street looking north towards Cathedral Square (2024)
- Interactive map of Colombo Street
- Length: 6.2 km (3.9 mi)
- Postal code: 8022 (south end to Ōpāwaho / Heathcote River); 8023 (Ōpāwaho / Heathcote River to Moorhouse Ave); 8011 (Moorhouse Ave to Avon River / Ōtākaro); 8013 (Avon River / Ōtākaro to Bealey Ave); 8014 (Bealey Ave to north end)
- Coordinates: 43°32′30″S 172°38′12″E
- South end: Dyers Pass Road / Cashmere Road / Centaurus Road roundabout
- North end: Edgeware Road

Construction
- Construction start: 1851

Colombo Street is a main road of the city of Christchurch, New Zealand. It runs south-north through the centre of Christchurch with a break at Cathedral Square. It is named after a colonial period Anglican bishopric, Colombo in Ceylon (Sri Lanka), as are some other central Christchurch streets running in parallel with it. Parts of the street which run through Sydenham were known as Addison Street during the 1880s, and some parts were known as Colombo Road.

== Geography ==
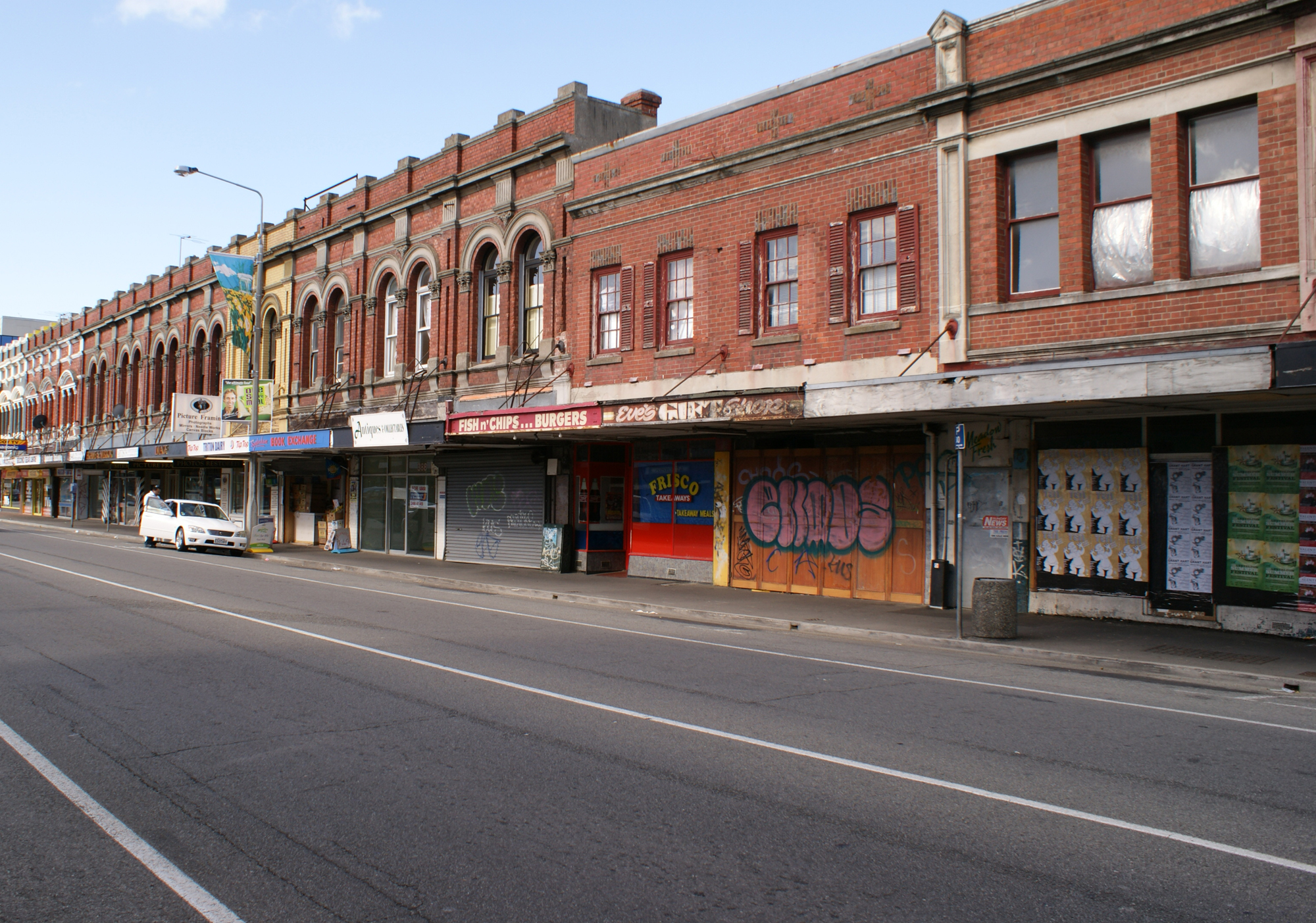
Former shops in Colombo Street, Sydenham; all demolished since the 2010 and 2011 earthquakes

Colombo Street runs for 6.2 kilometres (3.9 mi) due north-south. As with most Christchurch north-south streets, its numbering starts at its southern end. Like most of central Christchurch, the street is flat. It starts 4.0 kilometres (2.5 mi) south of the city centre at a roundabout junction with Dyers Pass Rd, which descends from the Port Hills and Cashmere and Centaurus Roads, which run along the foot of the hills. For its first few hundred metres the street runs north-northeast through the suburb of Somerfield, before turning due north and crossing the Ōpāwaho / Heathcote River in the residential suburb of Beckenham. The suburb of Sydenham starts once Tennyson Street is crossed. Between Tennyson Street and Strickland Street is a suburban shopping centre. Colombo Street crosses the Christchurch ring route (SH 76, at that point called Brougham Street) and enters the commercial/industrial part of Sydenham.

North of Sydenham, Colombo Street crosses the Christchurch-Lyttelton railway line via a flyover then passes beneath the Moorhouse Avenue flyover, entering the Christchurch Central City. It passes the Bus Interchange (until 2011 the Bus Exchange), the city's central bus depot and crosses the major pedestrian mall, City Mall (Cashel Street) before being interrupted by Cathedral Square, the heart of Christchurch. In the square it crosses the loop of the Christchurch tramway circuit, crossing it again two blocks north at Armagh Street. From Armagh Street it skirts the edge of Victoria Square and crosses the Avon River / Ōtākaro before passing the James Hay Theatre, part of the Christchurch Town Hall.

Colombo Street passes St Mary's Primary School and the former Christchurch Women's Hospital complex (now demolished) before crossing Bealey Avenue and entering the residential suburb of St Albans. The street terminates at Edgeware Road, 2.2 kilometres (1.4 mi) north of Cathedral Square. The highest street number is 1075.

Until the reinstatement of Barnes dance crossings in Dunedin in the 2010s, the only remaining Barnes Dance intersections in the South Island were on Colombo Street, at the intersections with Armagh, Gloucester, and Hereford Streets. The Colombo / Hereford intersection has the highest pedestrian count. A further Barnes dance is under consideration for Lichfield Street in conjunction with the relocated central city bus exchange.

== History ==
Colombo Street was one of the city's original streets, being laid out at the time of the settlement of Canterbury Province in 1850 by surveyors Joseph Thomas and Edward Jollie.

The first traffic lights in the South Island were installed at the intersection of Cashel and Colombo Streets. The traffic lights, which were first tested on the evening of 5 November 1930, replaced officers on point duty. (Note: In the book Christchurch chronology: a history of settlement, the incorrect installation date of December 1930 is given.)

The street was the site of one of the worst disasters in New Zealand history, with a major fire that swept through the Ballantyne's Department Store in November 1947 killing 41 people. The disaster remains the country's most deadly fire.

=== Cathedral Square ===
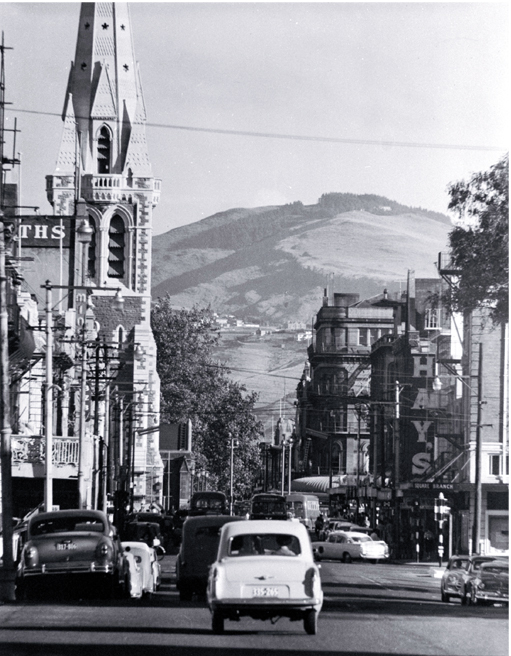
Colombo Street in 1960 looking south, with the tower of ChristChurch Cathedral visible in Cathedral Square

In the original survey of central Christchurch (known as the Black Map), which was undertaken in 1850, it was envisaged for Christ's College and ChristChurch Cathedral to be built adjacent to one another in Cathedral Square, modelled on Christ Church, Oxford. The area set aside for the college in Cathedral Square was found to be insufficient, and Henry Sewell suggested in June 1853 to move the college to land reserved for the Christchurch Botanic Gardens. This transaction was formalised through The Cathedral Square Ordinance 1858, a law passed by the Canterbury Provincial Council in October 1858. The ordinance allowed for Colombo Street to go straight through the middle of Cathedral Square at a legal width of 1.5 chains (99 ft; 30 m), and the cathedral to be placed west of this thoroughfare.

Christianity has adopted the practice of praying towards the East as the Orient was thought of as containing the mankind's original home. Hence, most Christian churches are oriented towards the east, and to comply with this convention, Henry Harper, Christchurch's first Bishop, lobbied to have the eastern side of Cathedral Square to be used for the pro-cathedral. That way, the main entrance would face Colombo Street, resulting in praying towards the east in line with convention. The Cathedral Square Amendment Ordinance 1859, which was passed a year after the previous ordinance, formalised the change in placement of the cathedral.

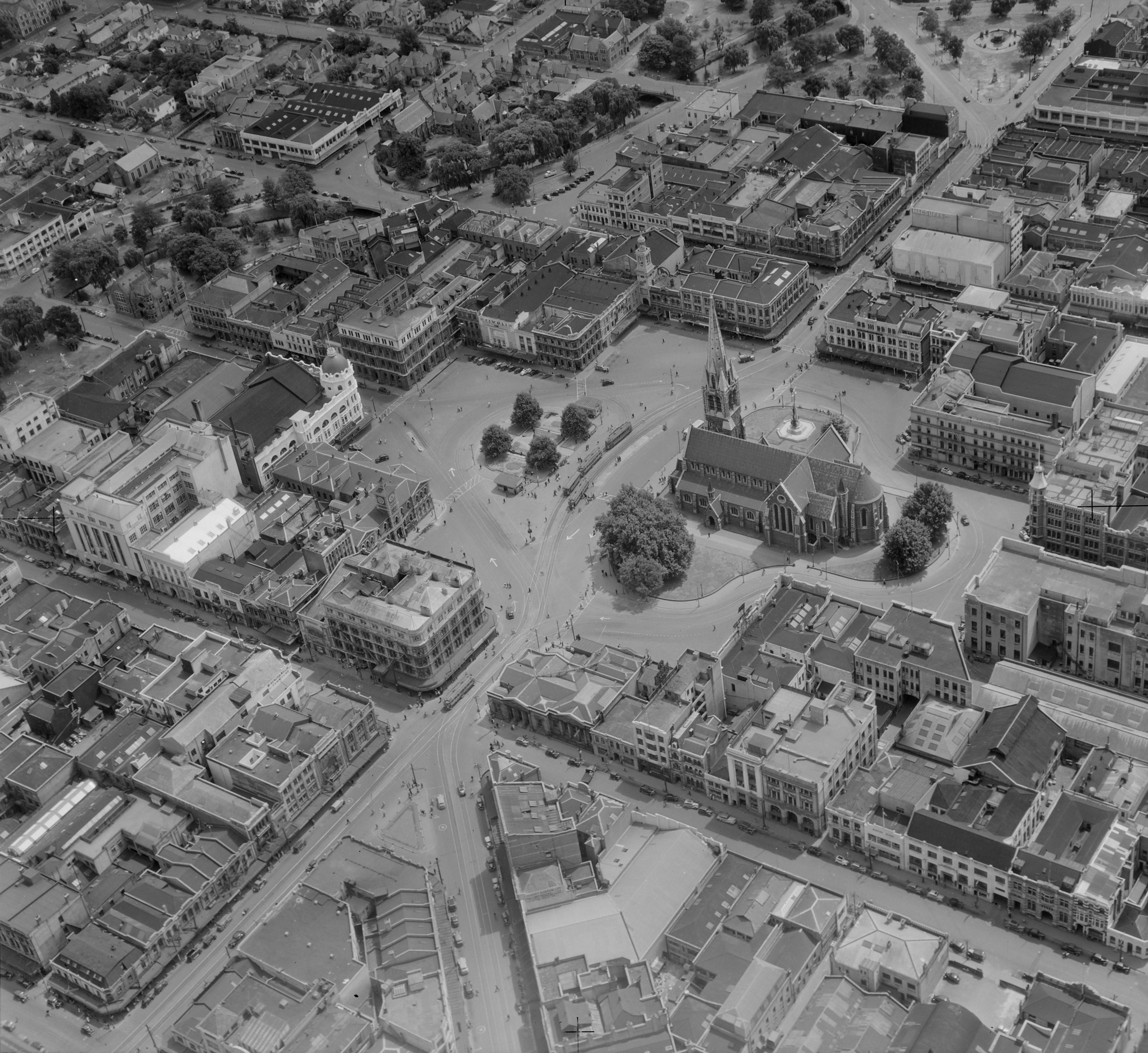
Aerial view of Cathedral Square showing the curved alignment of Colombo Street (pre-1954)

Just before work on the cathedral's foundations began in 1864, the alignment of Colombo Street through Cathedral Square was changed again by introducing a curve towards the west; the western side of the legal road had a radius of 3 chains 75 links (75 m). The purpose of this change was to allow the placement of the cathedral slightly further west, making its tower visible along Colombo Street from a distance.

Until 1965, Colombo Street did not stop at Cathedral Square but continued across it, running across the foot of the cathedral. Several pedestrianisation schemes over the latter part of the century extended the traffic-free area of the central city, and the street was finally stopped from entering the square itself. Recent controversial plans have suggested restoring traffic-flow along the part of Colombo Street which was blocked off in 1965.

=== Registered heritage buildings ===
Colombo Street contains or contained eleven structures that are registered as Category II historic places by Heritage New Zealand:

Photo	Name	Status	Address	Description
	Rose Historic Chapel	In use	866 Colombo Street	Chapel of the former St. Mary's Convent
	Wharetiki House	Demolished	854 Colombo Street	Residential property just north of Salisbury Street
	Avon River / Ōtākaro Bridge	Reopened in April 2014	n/a	Road bridge adjacent to and at the north end of Victoria Square
	Isaac House	In use	779 Colombo Street; corner Armagh Street	Commercial building south of Victoria Square in Inter War Georgian Revival style
	The Union Centre Building (formerly Armstrong's)	Demolished	91–107 Armagh Street	Commercial building opposite Isaac House
	Beaths Department Store Building	In use	682–690 Colombo Street; corner Cashel Mall	Forms part of The Crossing Mall
	New City Hotel	In use	527–533 Colombo Street; corner Bath Street	Hotel
	Sydenham Post Office Building	Demolished	527–533 Colombo Street; corner Brougham Street	Restaurant
	Sydenham Heritage Church	Demolished	253 Brougham Street	Church
	Beckenham Baptist Church	Demolished	c.146 Colombo Street	Church
	Old Malthouse	In use	71 Colombo Street	A children's theatre

Three further Category II structures are located in Victoria Square:

- Queen Victoria Statue, unveiled in 1903
- Cook Statue, donated in 1932 by Matthew Barnett, the owner of Wharetiki (mentioned above)
- Victoria Street Bridge, known as the Hamish Hay Bridge, the bridge of the former Victoria Street over the Avon River / Ōtākaro

Proceeding through Cathedral Square, there are several Category I and II heritage structures, as outlined in the Cathedral Square article.

== 2010 and 2011 earthquakes ==
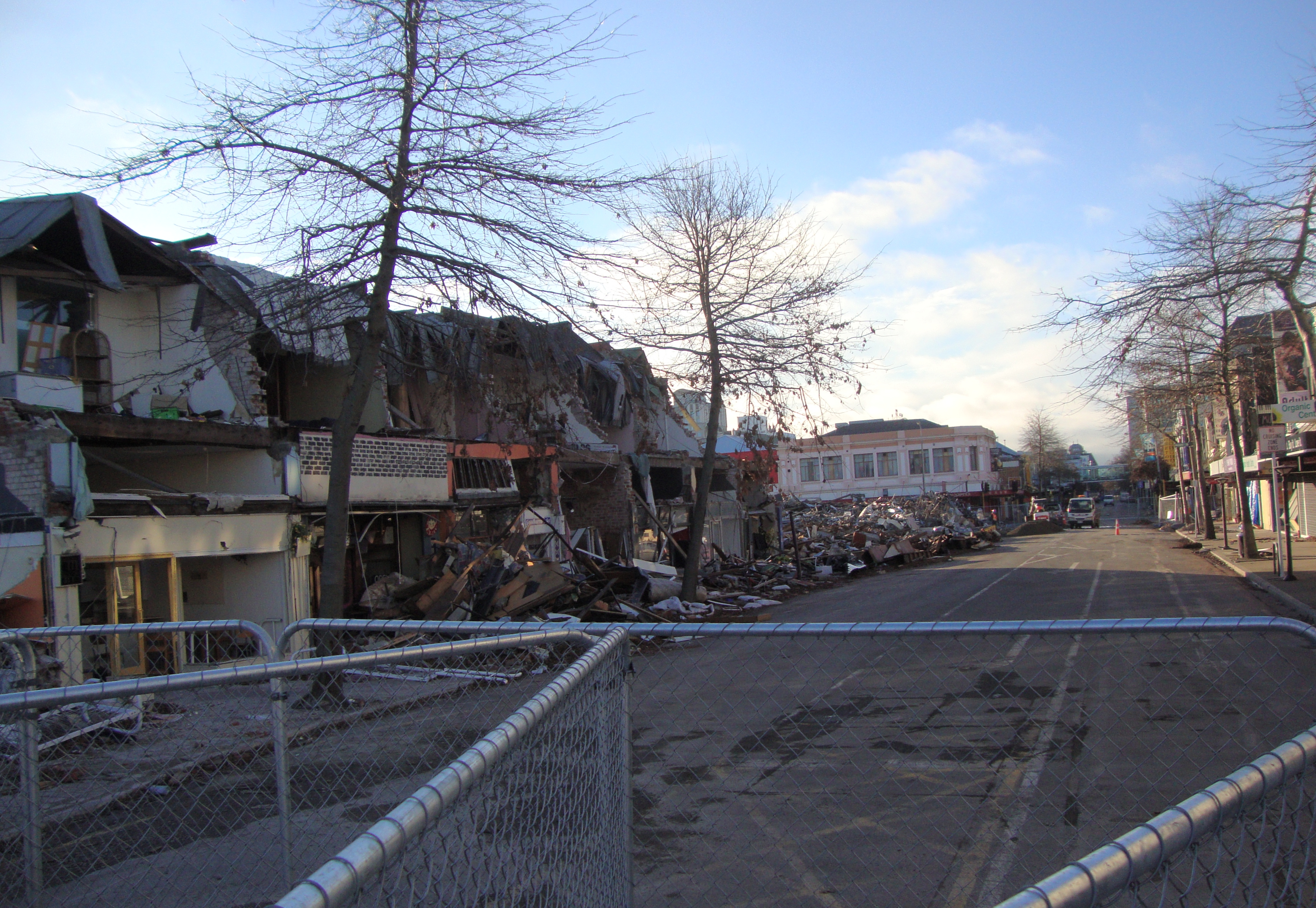
After the February 2011 Christchurch earthquake, looking north from St Asaph Street – 15 people died in this section of road

Much of Colombo Street through Sydenham was damaged by the 2010 Canterbury earthquake. For several months, the road was only partially open.

Further earthquake damage was caused by the February 2011 Christchurch earthquake. Many of the remaining historic buildings in Sydenham have subsequently been demolished. Buildings between St Asaph Street and Hereford Street suffered major damage, with many having since been removed. Two buses in the section south of Tuam Street were crushed by falling façades.

In total, 19 people were killed in Colombo Street in the February 2011 earthquake; all but one died in the central city:

- two people died in the block between Armagh and Gloucester Streets
- one person died in the block between Lichfield and Tuam Streets
- fifteen people died in the block between Tuam and St Asaph Streets, including eight on Red Bus number 702 (Ann Brower was the sole survivor on that bus)
- one person died in the block between Wordsworth and Elgin Streets in Sydenham

== Major intersections ==
Location	km	mi	Destinations	Notes
Cashmere	0.0	0.0	Centaurus Road – Hillsborough, Lyttelton; Dyers Pass Road – Governors Bay; Cashmere Road – Princess Margaret Hospital, Halswell	Colombo Street begins
Cashmere	0.8	0.50	Ōpāwaho / Heathcote River	
Sydenham	1.2	0.75	Tennyson Street	
Sydenham	1.3	0.81	Strickland Street	
Sydenham	1.7	1.1	Beaumont Street	
Sydenham	2.0	1.2	Milton Street – Spreydon, Halswell; Huxley Street – North via City Centre	
Sydenham	2.3	1.4	SH 76 west (Brougham Street) – Addington, Timaru; SH 76 east (Brougham Street) – Waltham, Lyttelton	
Sydenham	2.6	1.6	Wordsworth Street	
Sydenham	2.9	1.8	Sandyford Street; Byron Street	
Sydenham/Christchurch Central boundary	3.2	2.0	Moorhouse Avenue	
Christchurch Central	3.6	2.2	Saint Asaph Street	
Christchurch Central	3.7	2.3	Tuam Street	
Christchurch Central	3.8	2.4	Lichfield Street	
Christchurch Central	3.9	2.4	Cashel Street	
Christchurch Central	4.0	2.5	Hereford Street; High Street	
Christchurch Central	Interrupted by Cathedral Square			
Christchurch Central	4.4	2.7	Gloucester Street	
Christchurch Central	4.5	2.8	Armagh Street	
Christchurch Central	4.7	2.9	Avon River / Ōtākaro	
Christchurch Central	4.8	3.0	Kilmore Street	
Christchurch Central	5.0	3.1	Salisbury Street	
Christchurch Central/St Albans boundary	5.4	3.4	Bealey Avenue	
St Albans	6.2	3.9	Edgeware Road	Colombo Street ends
1.000 mi = 1.609 km; 1.000 km = 0.621 mi
