= Citizens' War Memorial =

New Zealand war memorial

- New Zealand
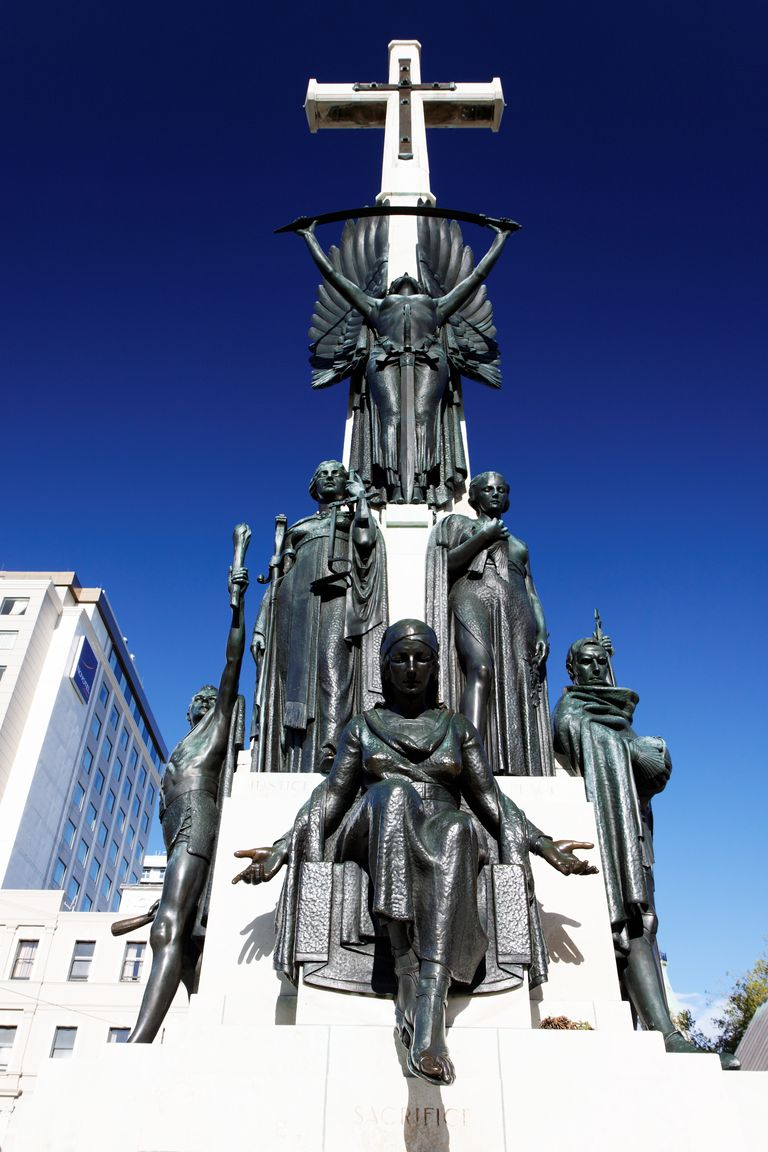
- Citizens' War Memorial in Christchurch's Cathedral Square
- For New Zealand dead of World War I
- Unveiled: 9 June 1937
- Location: 43.5307°S 172.6363°E
- Designed by: William Trethewey (stonemason); George Hart (architect)
- In grateful remembrance of the sons and daughters of Canterbury who fell in the Great War 1914–1918 Give peace in our time o Lord.

The Citizens' War Memorial (alternate: Soldiers' War Memorial) in Cathedral Square, Christchurch, is one of the two major memorials in the city to World War I. It is located immediately north of ChristChurch Cathedral. The annual Anzac Day service was held there until the February 2011 earthquake; since then the memorial has been behind the fence around the cathedral. It is a Category I heritage structure registered with Heritage New Zealand. Between 2021 and 2022, the memorial was repaired and shifted 50 metres (160 ft) to the west. The Citizens' War Memorial was used for the 2023 ANZAC day dawn service in Christchurch.

== Geography ==
The Citizens' War Memorial is located in Cathedral Square in Christchurch. In its original position, it was immediately north of ChristChurch Cathedral on land owned by the Anglican Church. The heritage tram passes the memorial on the road that goes behind and around the cathedral.

The memorial was dismantled beginning in April 2021 and placed into storage, undergoing earthquake repairs. The redevelopment of the cathedral placed a visitor centre in the place of the memorial, necessitating its relocation. City councillors resolved to have it reinstated 50 metres (160 ft) to the west on land owned by Christchurch City Council. In November 2022, the stone structure making up the memorial was completed, with the bronze figures to be installed over the coming months. The intention is to have the reinstatement completed by 25 April 2023, i.e. for Anzac Day.

== History ==
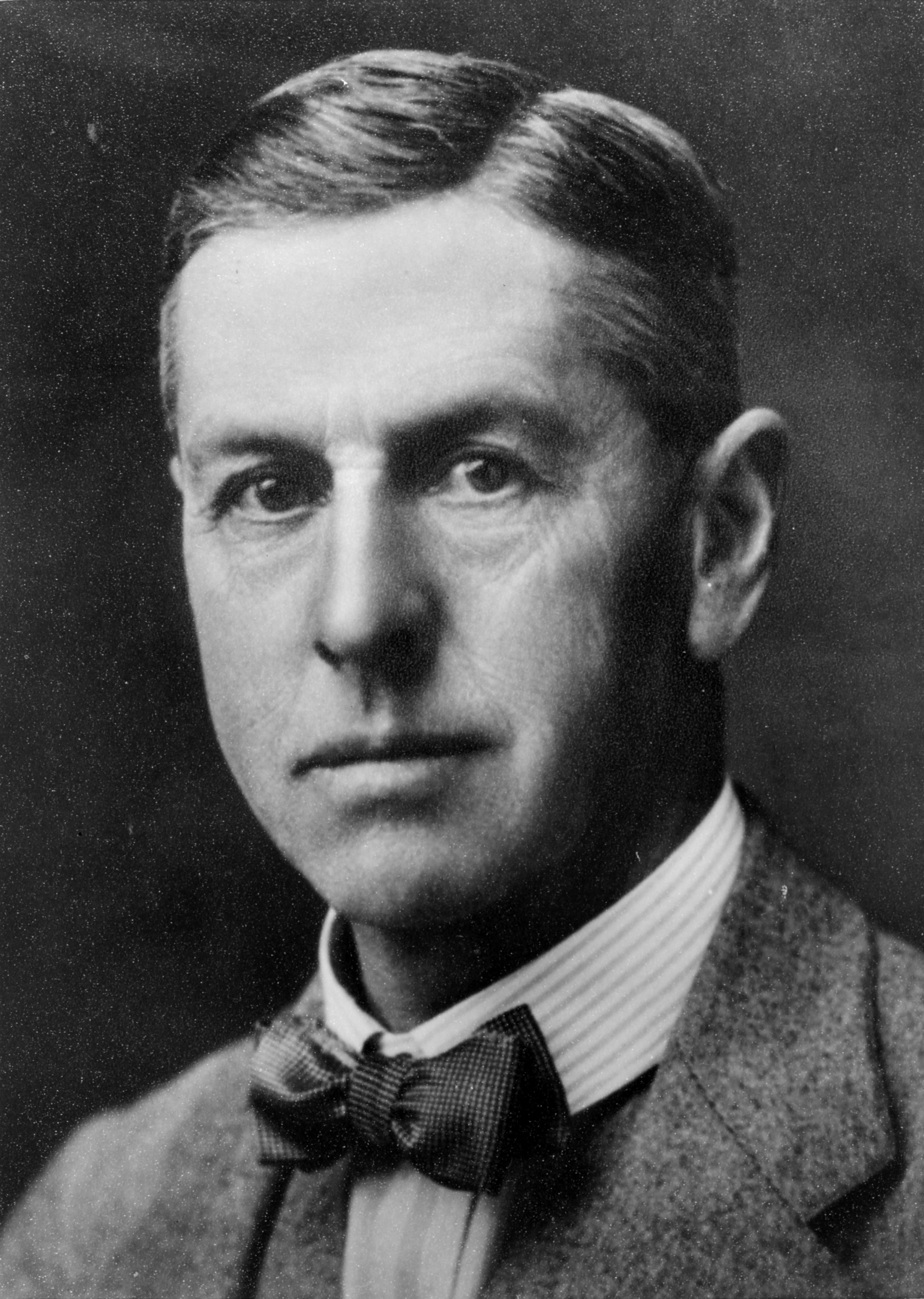
George Gould in ca 1923

George Gould (1865–1941) was a successful businessman, farmer and stock breeder. He was a director of The Press from 1903 until his death with one brief interruption. He chaired the board through the years of the Christchurch newspaper war in 1934–1935. His company, Pyne Gould Corporation Limited, is these days listed on the New Zealand Stock Market.

After World War I, many ideas for a war memorial were put forward. Gould proposed a column opposite of ChristChurch Cathedral and by 1920, this was one of the three dominant proposals. The Bridge of Remembrance was adopted, while the hall of memories idea disappeared due to lack of support. Gould's idea received the support of the Canterbury Anglican elite. While the Bridge of Remembrance was unveiled in 1924, the Christchurch City Council opposed the Cathedral Square proposal and stopped it from going ahead. The argument was that the cathedral would dwarf the memorial, and that the bustling nature of the square was an inappropriate setting for a place of reflection. In 1933, the Godley Statue was relocated from its position just north of the cathedral to its original location opposite it. Gould seized the opportunity and proposed the vacated site for the memorial, and the Anglican Church as the owner of the land agreed under the condition that a cross be incorporated into the design. Gould promoted the memorial as "an emblem of peace rather than ... war". While the original intention was to import statuary from England, the manufacturers' association wanted the work to be done locally and put Trethewey's name forward, but the Returned Services' Association opposed this as he had not gone to war.

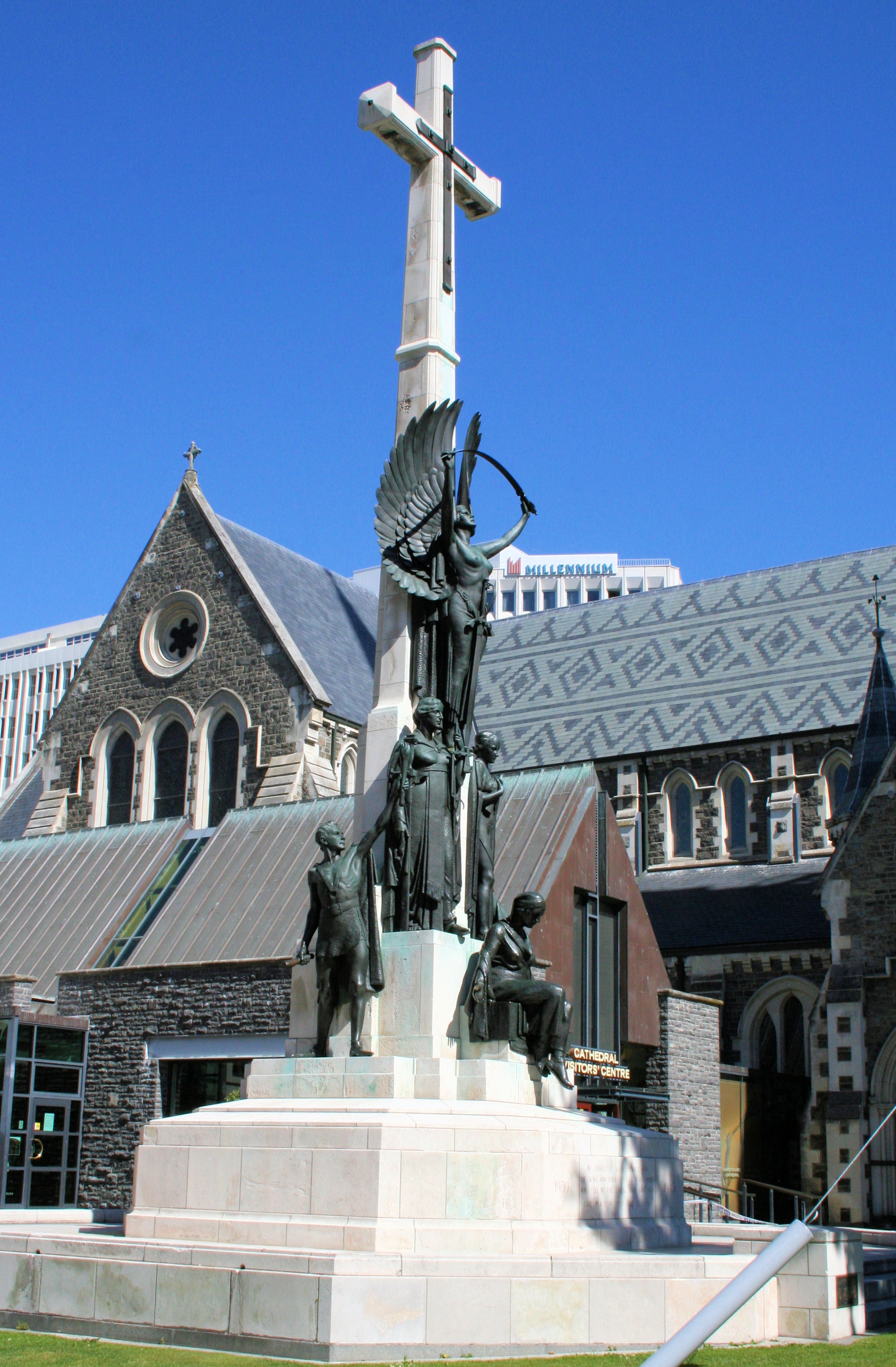
The Citizens' War Memorial in front of the Cathedral

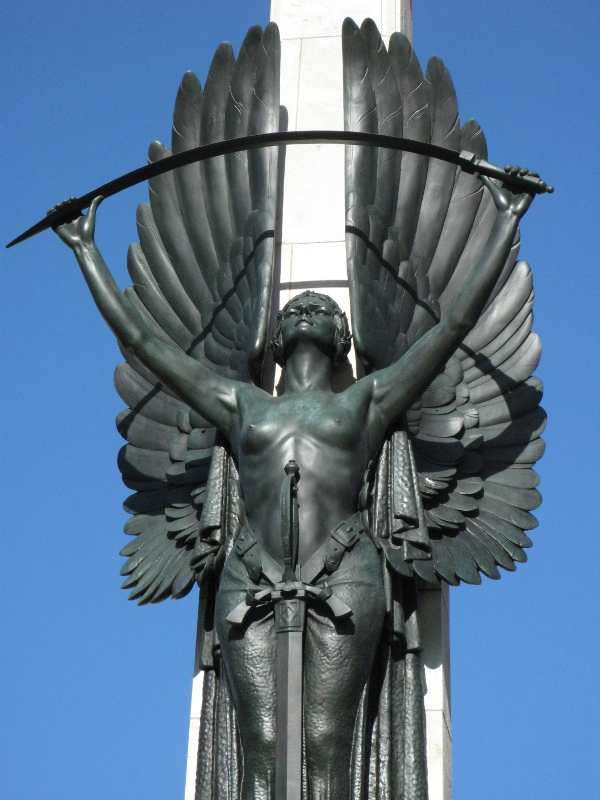
Part of the large memorial where a bronze angel bends the sword of war

The design was to be of peace not war; a cross should be included, as well as an expression of high ideals. The memorial was designed by the architect George Hart (1876–1961) and the Christchurch sculptor William Trethewey (1892–1956). According to Trethewey's son, the sculptor took out a pencil one lunch and sketched a possible war memorial. He took the sketch to Hart and from this, they produced the design. The design was accepted in 1933, after which Trethewey refined it before carving the figures in clay, boxing them up, and forwarding them for casting to Arthur Bryan Burton's Thames Ditton Foundry in Surrey. Trethewey travelled to London and supervised the casting of the bronze figures.

The Citizens' War Memorial (or Soldiers' War Memorial) was unveiled on 9 June 1937 by Colonel S C P Nicholls, with Archbishop Julius conducting the service. It was erected next to the cathedral on a site which had been occupied by the statue of John Robert Godley, which was moved back to its original location. According to MacLean and Phillips in The sorrow and the pride: New Zealand war memorials, it is possible to make 'a good case...for it being the finest public monument in the country'.

Each year on Anzac Day, services are held at the memorial with thousands of Cantabrians in attendance. In 2011, with the Christchurch Central City cordoned off following the earthquake in February, the service was held in Hagley Park instead. In subsequent years, the annual service went to Cranmer Square. Just prior to the 2017 Anzac Day service, the Christchurch branch of the Royal New Zealand Returned and Services' Association (RSA) asked for the memorial to be relocated to Cranmer Square, as the protracted negotiations between the government and the Anglican Church about the restoration of the adjacent Cathedral deny the public access. In 2020, it became known that the plans for the restoration of the Cathedral required the removal of the Citizens' War Memorial; it was agreed to be removed and put into storage unless a new location can be agreed on. In April 2021, it was announced that the memorial would be relocated to the site of the old police kiosk slightly in front of its original location in Cathedral Square, the memorial will also be restored and repaired. Between April 2022 and September 2022 the sculpture Sacrifice was displayed in the Canterbury Museum foyer. The memorial was to be put back on display in time for Armistice Day 2022 (11 November), but the date was missed. Instead, the structure minus the bronze figures was finished by end of November 2022. The memorial was re-dedicated on 17 February 2023 by Anne, Princess Royal.

=== Ownership ===
The Anglican Church was the original owner of the memorial. With the 2022 relocation onto land owned by Christchurch City Council, the Anglican Church transferred ownership of the memorial to the city council as well as future maintenance.

== Design ==
The bronze memorial stands 16 metres (52 ft) in height. The compilation of bronzes were cast in London and are characterised as classicising idealism. The allegorical figures included Youth, Sacrifice, Justice, Valour, and Peace. They were based on Trethewey's family and friends, such as Trethewey's daughter Pauline, his workman, Bob Hampton who modelled for Youth, as well as the religious figure of Saint George. An engraving at the base of the memorial states:

In grateful remembrance of the sons and daughters of Canterbury who fell in the Great War 1914–1918 Give peace in our time o Lord.

== Heritage registration ==
The memorial is registered with Heritage New Zealand as a Category I heritage structure. Originally registered in 1984 by the New Zealand Historic Places Trust, its category was changed in 1995.
