= Cathedral Square police kiosk =

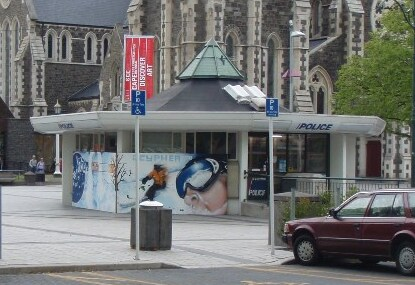
- The kiosk in 2008
- Interactive map of the Cathedral Square police kiosk area

General information
- Location: Cathedral Square, Christchurch, New Zealand
- Coordinates: 43.5305°S 172.6363°E
- Construction started: 1978
- Demolished: 2021

The Cathedral Square police kiosk was a small police building in Cathedral Square, Christchurch, New Zealand, until it was demolished in 2021. It was originally built in 1978 to serve as a bus information and ticket selling centre but was converted in 1986 to a police kiosk in order to combat crime. The building became vacant in 2017 after the police discontinued their lease of the kiosk due to the opening of the Justice and Emergency Services Precinct. In 2021 the kiosk was demolished to make way for the move of the nearby Citizens' War Memorial.

== Building ==
The building was hexagonal and has been described as having a "modernist building in the Brutalist style".

The kiosk was run by volunteers. There were 60 in 2011, mostly retirees.

== History ==
The kiosk was built in 1978 by the Christchurch Transport Board as a bus information and ticket selling centre. In 1986, it was converted to a police kiosk to combat crime, such as fighting amongst gang members, in the square. The idea for the kiosk came from another country and was reported in 1997 to have reduced crime in the area.

In 1998 the Christchurch City Council planned on removing the kiosk as part of a Cathedral Square development plan, but the council later decided on keeping the building. At another time the city council planned on renovating the kiosk, which would have cost $280,000, as part of a Cathedral Square redevelopment, but this did not occur due to a budget overrun. In 1999 the architect Don Donnithorne proposed a rebuild, which would have had stone walls to make it appear more similar to the rest of Cathedral Square, and use space from the square's underground men's toilets as the existing kiosk did not have enough space. In 2001 the city council hired the architect Ian Athfield to provide advice on improving the square, and he suggested removing the kiosk. In 2007 the city council asked for proposals for a property developer to redevelop the building but still allow for part of it to be used by the police. In 2006 the property developer David Henderson proposed turning it into a restaurant and bar, but this idea was rejected.

When Cathedral Square became a part of the Central City Red Zone in the month of the February 2011 Christchurch earthquake, the police kiosk was closed. After the city's Justice and Emergency Services Precinct was opened in 2017, the police discontinued their lease of the building. The council later considered turning it into public toilets but the idea was not carried out as the kiosk contained asbestos and the conversion would have cost $230,000. In December 2020 the city council decided to demolish the kiosk so that the Citizens' War Memorial, 50 m (160 ft) away, could be moved to where the kiosk once was. The demolition began in March 2021.
