= H. H. Clifford =

New Zealand photographer (1872–1949)

Henry Herbert Clifford
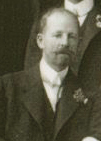
- Clifford on his wedding day, 1915
- Born: 1 May 1872; Dunedin, New Zealand
- Died: 19 February 1949 (aged 76); Christchurch, New Zealand
- Resting place: Bromley Cemetery
- Known for: Portrait photography
- Spouse: Annette Clifford (m. 1915)

Henry Herbert Clifford (1 May 1872 – 19 February 1949) was a New Zealand photographer. He ran a portrait photography studio in Christchurch. His 1905 photograph of Kate Sheppard has been featured on the New Zealand ten-dollar note since 1991. A collection of his works is held by the Canterbury Museum.

== Biography ==
Clifford was born in Dunedin to Janet Clifford (née Malcolm) and Robert Clifford, a photographer. His mother died in 1888.

Clifford worked as a photographer in Dunedin and Melbourne and then moved to Christchurch around 1900. He joined the firm of Standish & Preece. By 1903, he had opened his own studio and was Christchurch's leading portrait photographer. In around 1905, he took the photograph of Kate Sheppard that has been featured on the New Zealand ten-dollar note since 1991.

On 24 July 1915, he married Annette Clifford, and they had three sons. His oldest and youngest sons both died in their early 20s in 1940 in separate incidents; his oldest son, Robert, had been a Sergeant Pilot in the Royal Air Force, and died after being accidentally struck by a lorry at Oxford.

In 1925, Clifford won a certificate and a medal for exhibits at the British Empire Exhibition at Wembley. After Clifford's death in 1949, his surviving son, Ogilvie Clifford, donated a collection of his photographs to the Canterbury Museum. Two of his photograph portraits are held by the National Portrait Gallery in London. His photographs are also held by the National Library of New Zealand and Te Papa. He is buried at Bromley Cemetery.
