= Annette Clifford =

New Zealand landlord (1881–1968)

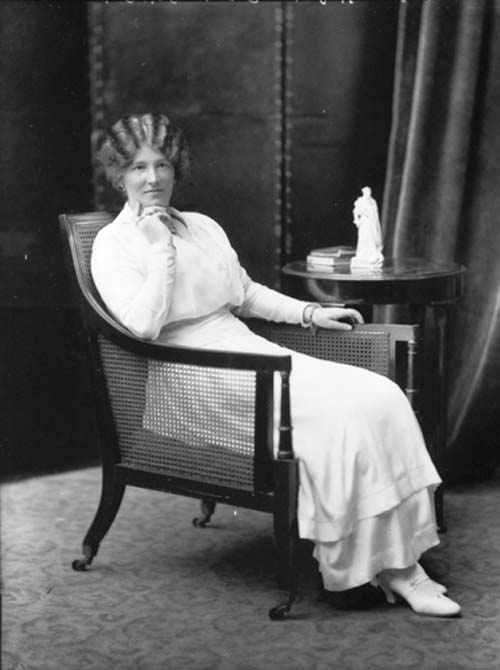
- Clifford, unknown date, photo taken by her husband H. H. Clifford
- Born: Annette Mary Eleanor Jane Thomas; 5 November 1881; Akaroa, New Zealand
- Died: 28 April 1968 (aged 86); Christchurch, New Zealand
- Occupation(s): Property owner and landlord
- Spouse: Henry Herbert Clifford (m. 1915; died 1949)
- Children: 3

Annette Mary Eleanor Jane Clifford (née Thomas; 5 November 1881 – 28 April 1968), also known as Ma Clifford, was a New Zealand property owner and landlord.

== Biography ==
Clifford was born in Akaroa, North Canterbury on 5 November 1881. Her father John Thomas, a farmer, died three months before she was born, and her mother Eliza Bates remarried in 1884. As a child she lived with both her father's family and with her mother and stepfather. She moved to Christchurch and worked as a music teacher.

On 24 July 1915 she married Henry Herbert Clifford, a portrait photographer, and they had three sons. Her oldest and youngest sons both died in their early 20s in 1940; her oldest son Robert had been a Sergeant Pilot in the Royal Air Force, and died at Oxford. Her husband died on 19 February 1949.

By 1944, Clifford and her remaining son Ogilvie had acquired about 40 old houses and converted them into smaller flats and apartments. She had been fined both in 1927 and again in 1943 for failure to pay stamp duty. A hearing took place in April 1944 before the Christchurch Land Sales Committee to consider their purchase of two further properties. The Committee approved one purchase but refused the other on the grounds that it would be "undue aggregation" of land under the Servicemen's Settlement and Land Sales Act, and could prevent returned servicemen from purchasing property.

By 1958, Clifford and her son owned at least 47 houses and were receiving rent from up to 550 tenants. Most of the houses were pre-1920 wooden buildings with colourful paintwork, and she had been sent a notice of non-compliance with housing improvement regulations after an inspection in 1953. Many of the properties were close to the University of Canterbury and popular with students.

In the 1960s Clifford was pursued by the Inland Revenue Department for failure to pay income tax over nine years. It was a long-running and high-profile case, with the result that she was convicted and fined £100 for each year that a false return had been filed. The verdict was upheld by the Court of Appeal.

Clifford died in Christchurch on 28 April 1968, survived by her son Ogilvie. She is buried at Bromley Cemetery.
