= William Trethewey =

New Zealand sculptor

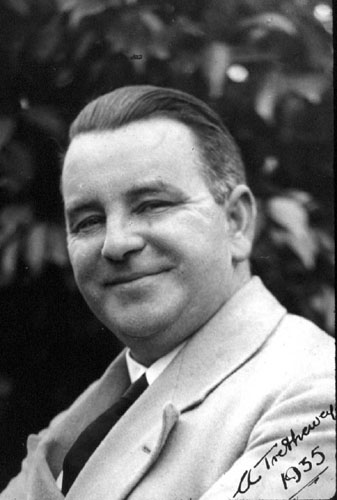
- William Trethewey in 1935
- Born: 8 September 1892; Christchurch
- Died: 4 May 1956 (aged 63); Christchurch
- Education: Frederick Gurnsey (wood carving); Joseph Ellis (life modelling)
- Known for: Monumental masonry
- Notable work: Statue of Margaret Cruickshank; Cook Statue; Citizens' War Memorial; Kaiapoi War Memorial

William Thomas Trethewey (8 September 1892 – 4 May 1956) was a sculptor and monumental mason from Christchurch, New Zealand. His best known work is the Citizens' War Memorial in Cathedral Square, Christchurch, where the city's annual Anzac Day service is held.

== Early life ==
Trethewey was born in 1892 in Christchurch. His parents, Mary Wallace and the carpenter Jabez Trethewey, were from Cornwall. They lived in Linwood. He attended Christchurch East School and left school at the age of 13. He trained as a wood carver and studied under Frederick Gurnsey at the Canterbury College School of Art.

== Family ==
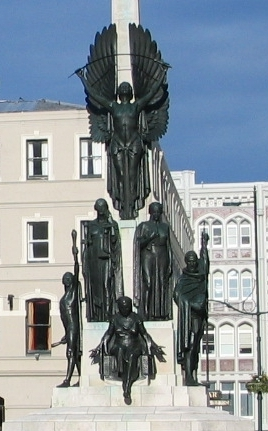
Pauline Tretheway was the model for the figure on the right of the second level.

Trethewey married Ivy Louisa Harper (1893–1975) on 24 July 1914, and they had four children together. He cited family and study commitments to avoid military service in World War I. His daughter Pauline was a model for the figure of Peace in his best known work, the Citizens' War Memorial in Cathedral Square.

After their marriage, the couple moved to Wellington, where he attended life-modelling classes under Joseph Ellis. It is said though, that Trethewey was mostly self-educated. He obtained knowledge of anatomy by observing the different muscles while he shaved, and read about the sculpting work of Gian Lorenzo Bernini, Michelangelo and Auguste Rodin.

== Professional career ==
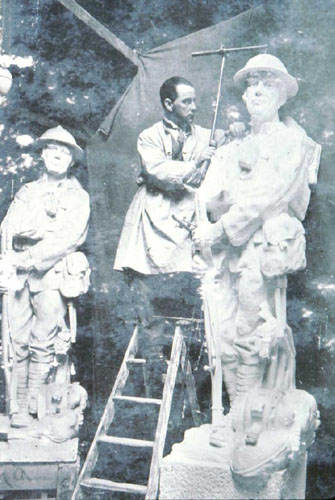
Trethewey sculpting the Kaiapoi war memorial c. 1922

Inspired by the European sculptors that he read about, Trethewey decided to switch from wood carving to become a monumental mason. With the end of World War I, the need for memorials arose. Trethewey produced 'The Bomb Thrower', in the hope that a local community would buy it as a memorial. It was a highly realistic sculpture of an Anzac soldier about to throw a grenade, with a strained face and a ripped shirt. It did not meet the public's expectation, as most people had an idealistic view of the war. He submitted the sculpture to the annual Canterbury Society of Arts exhibition in 1919 and the piece aroused great interest. The society purchased the sculpture, but lost it.

His first commission was a St Andrew's Cross for Elmwood Normal School in the Christchurch suburb of Merivale. It was a memorial for the 154 former Elmwood pupils who had served in the war, and it was unveiled by the Minister of Education, James Parr, on 26 February 1921.

Most war memorials were imported mass-produced carvings. Trethewey received only one more commission for a war memorial in those years, from the community in Kaiapoi. The resulting work was a digger on a base which had been prepared by his then business partner Daniel Berry. At the time, the sculpture was judged to personify the Anzac spirit, and the mayor held an enthusiastic speech at the unveiling on 26 April 1922.

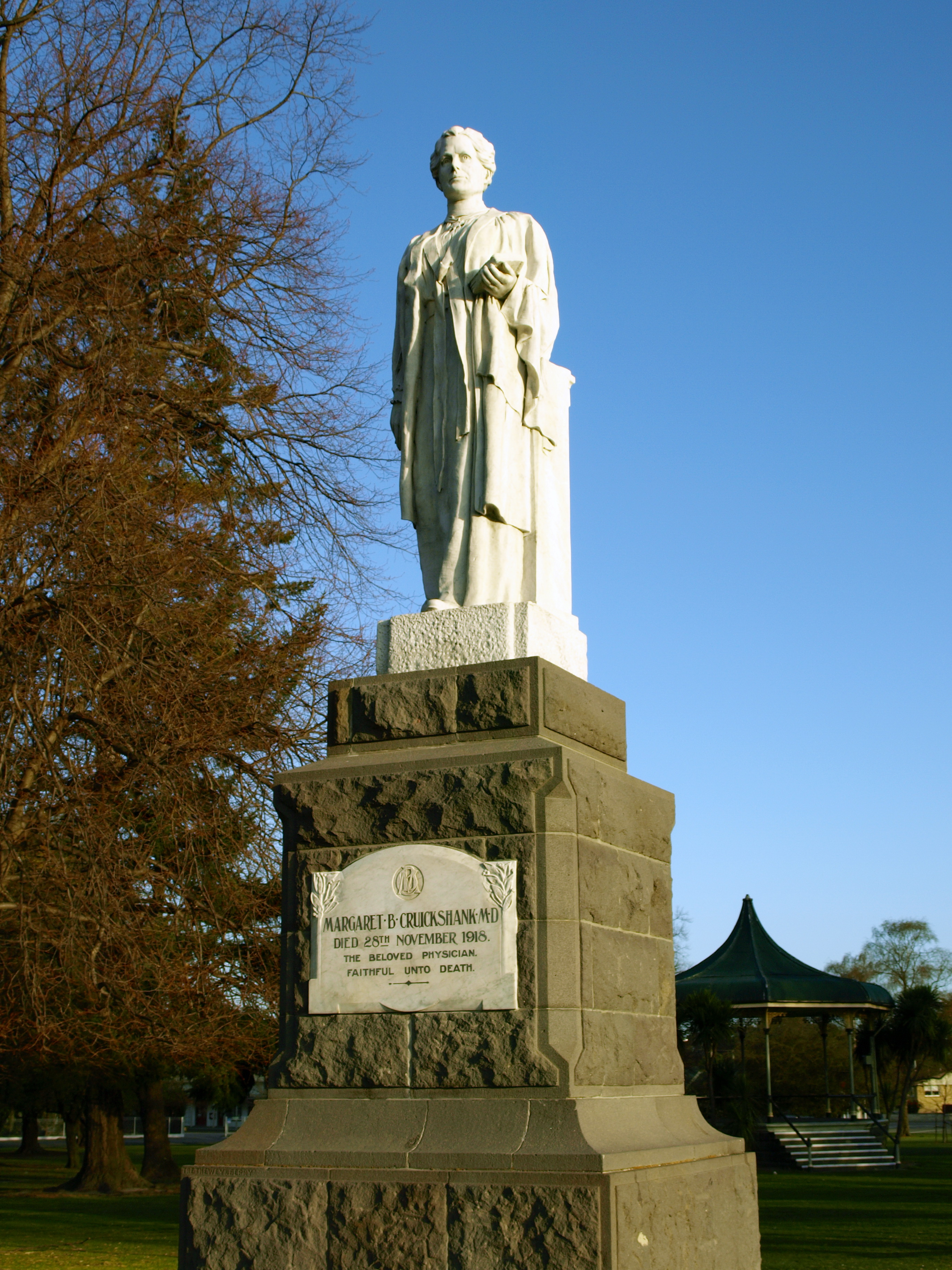
Cruickshank memorial in 2009

His next commission was a memorial in Waimate for Margaret Cruickshank, the first registered woman doctor in New Zealand; she had died from the 1918 flu pandemic. Trethewey worked from photos and sculpted a 3 metres (9.8 ft) tall statue from a five-ton piece of Carrara marble. The memorial was unveiled in January 1923. Trethewey was paid £800 for this commission.

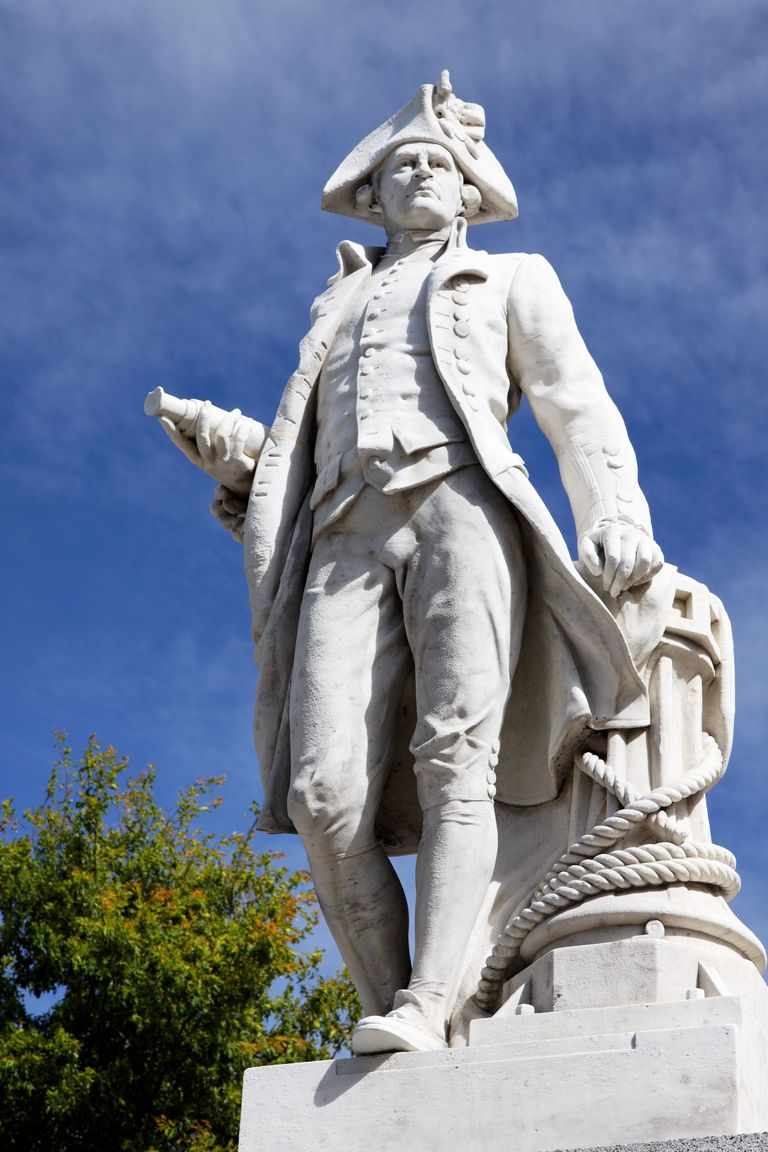
The Cook Statue in Victoria Square, Christchurch

Subsequent works were a bust of Christchurch Hospital benefactor Hyam Marks, a bust of Christchurch Mayor Charles Gray (1853–1918) commissioned by Christchurch City Council, a shearer for the British Empire Exhibition in 1924–1925, and plaster work at the Civic Theatre, next to the then civic offices in Manchester Street.

=== Cook Statue ===
The bookmaker and philanthropist Matthew Barnett (1861–1935) donated a statue of James Cook to the city. Trethewey won a competition and was chosen as the sculptor; this was his biggest commission in his career so far. A 12-ton block of Carrara marble was imported for this work. The sculpture was unveiled on 10 August 1932 in Victoria Square by the Governor-General, Lord Bledisloe, and brought Trethewey much publicity, including coverage on Movietone News. The Cook Statue is registered as a Category II heritage item by Heritage New Zealand.

=== Citizens' War Memorial ===
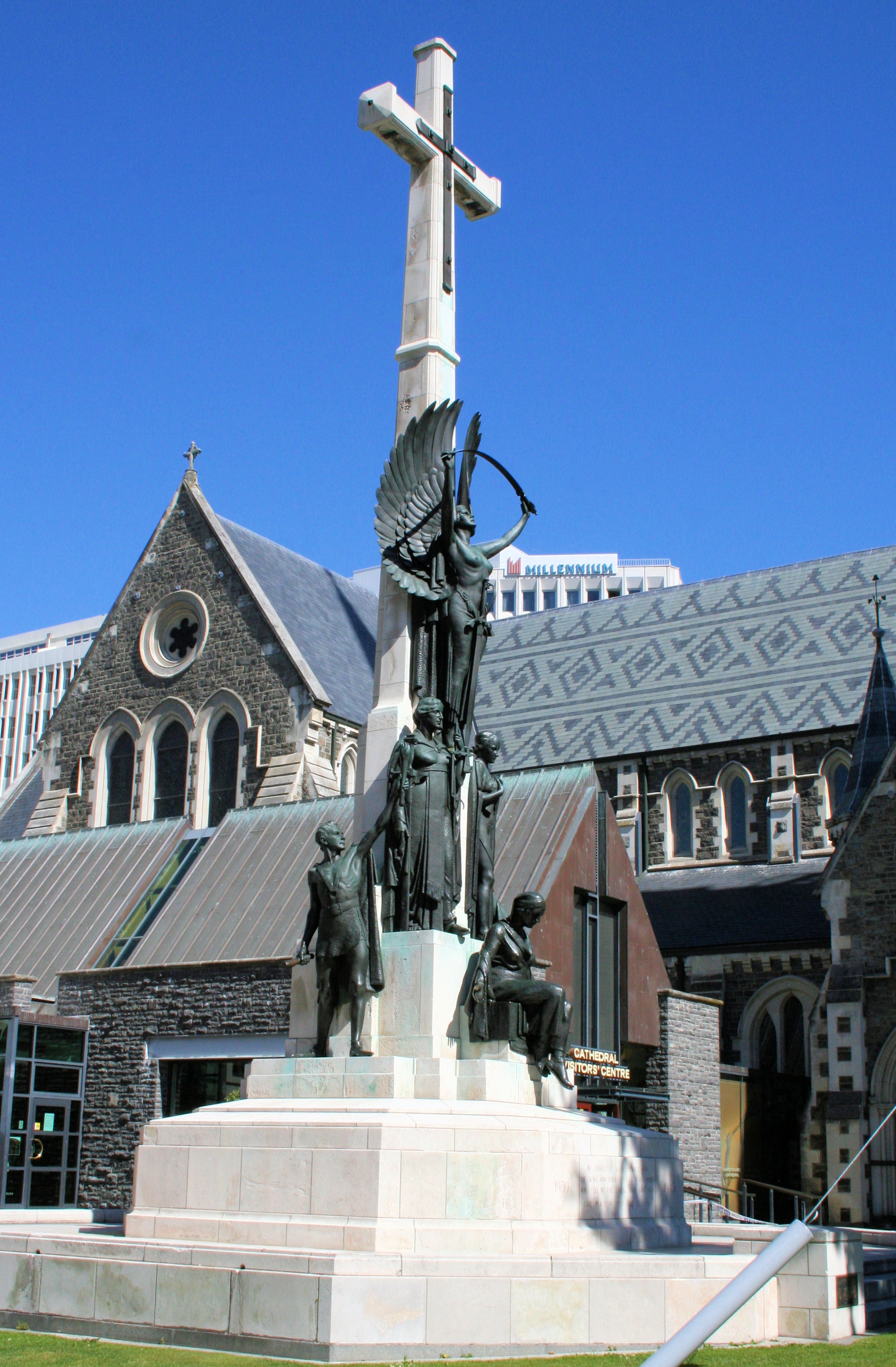
Citizens' War Memorial in front of the Cathedral

George Gould (1865–1941) was a successful businessman, farmer and stock breeder. He was a director of The Press from 1903 until his death with one brief interruption. He chaired the board through the years of the Christchurch newspaper war in 1934–1935. His company, Pyne Gould Corporation Limited, is these days listed on the New Zealand Stock Market.

After the war, many ideas for a war memorial were put forward. Gould proposed a column opposite the ChristChurch Cathedral and by 1920, this was one of the three dominant proposals. Two of those proposals, the other the Bridge of Remembrance, were eventually adopted, with Gould's idea receiving the support of the Canterbury Anglican elite. While the Bridge of Remembrance was unveiled in 1924, the Christchurch City Council opposed the Cathedral Square proposal and stopped it from going ahead. The argument was that the cathedral would dwarf the memorial, and that the bustling nature of the Square was an inappropriate setting for a place of reflection. In 1933, the Godley Statue was relocated from its position just north of the cathedral to its original location opposite it. Gould seized the opportunity and proposed the vacated site for the memorial, and the Anglican Church as the owner of the land agreed under the condition that a cross be incorporated into the design. Gould promoted the memorial as "an emblem of peace rather than ... war". The manufacturers' association wanted the work to be done locally and put Trethewey's name forward, but the Returned Services' Association opposed this as he had not served in the military during the war.

According to Tretheway's son, the sculptor took out a pencil during a lunch break one day, and sketched a possible war memorial. He took the sketch to architect George Hart and from this, they produced the design. The design was accepted in June 1933, after which Trethewey refined it before carving the figures in clay, boxing them up, and forwarding them for casting to Arthur Bryan Burton's Thames Ditton Foundry in Surrey. Trethewey travelled to London and supervised the casting of the bronze figures. The figures, representing Youth, Justice, Peace, Valour and Sacrifice, are based on friends and family of Tretheway; his daughter Pauline modelled for Peace, and his workman, Bob Hampton, modelled for Youth.

The Citizens' War Memorial was unveiled on 9 June 1937. According to MacLean and Phillips in The sorrow and the pride: New Zealand war memorials, it is possible to make 'a good case...for it being the finest public monument in the country'. The memorial is registered as a Category I heritage item with the New Zealand Historic Places Trust, and it is the site of the annual Anzac Day service in Christchurch.

=== Later works ===
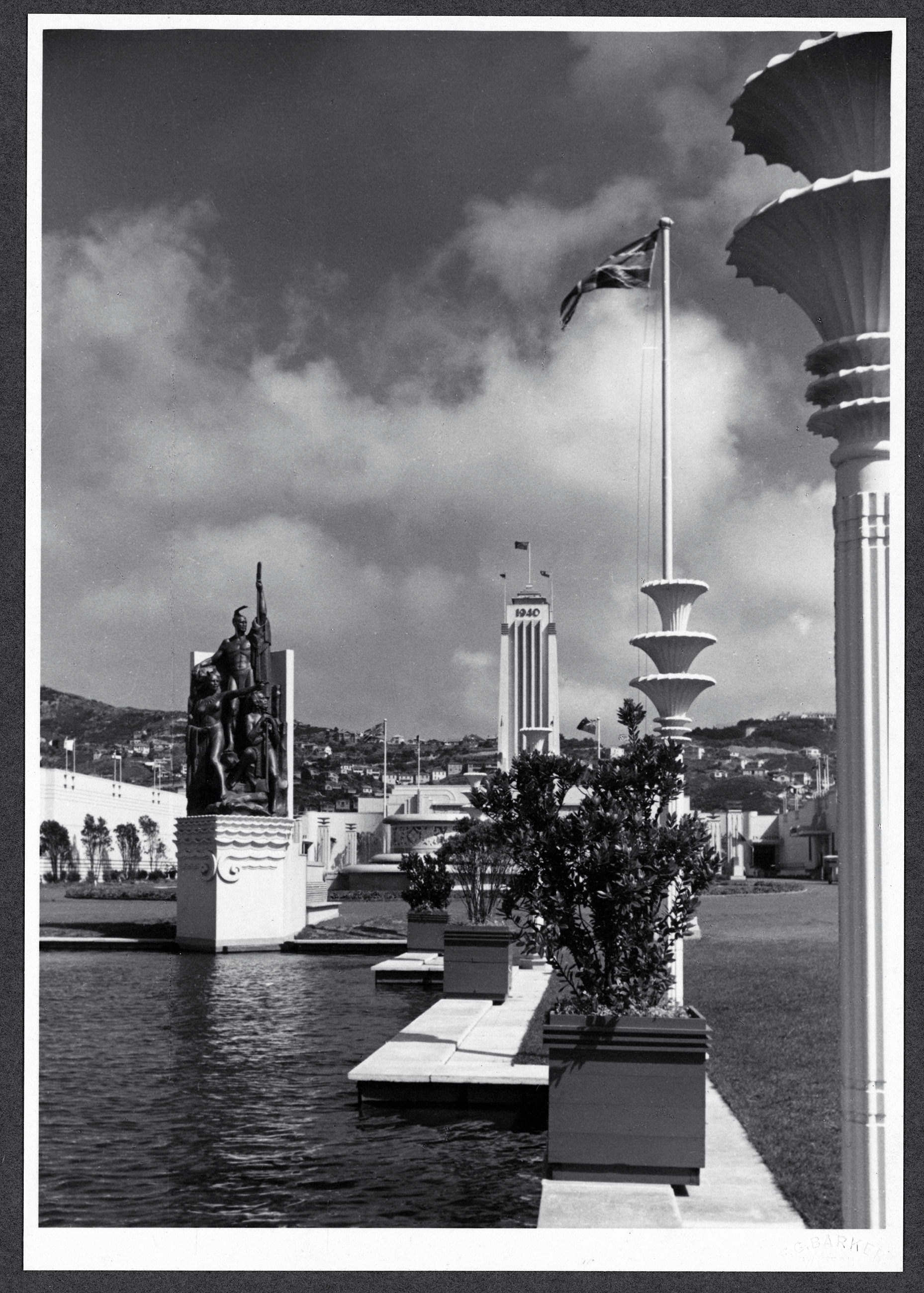
Kupe Statue at the Centennial Exhibition

Trethewey was commissioned to produce a sculpture of Maui Pomare (1875 or 1876–1930), a prominent Māori political figure, which was erected in Waitara in 1936.

He produced the statuary for the New Zealand Centennial Exhibition that was held in 1939/40 in Rongotai, Wellington. A 100 feet (30 m) frieze depicting the progress of New Zealand, groupings of pioneers, lions in Art Deco style, a large fountain and a figure of Kupe standing on the prow of his canoe were produced for the centennial exhibition. Of all these works, only the Kupe statue still remains. After having spent many decades at Wellington railway station, then the Wellington Show and Sports Centre and finally at Te Papa, the Kupe Group Trust successfully fundraised to have the plaster statue cast in bronze. Since 2000, the bronze statue has been installed at the Wellington Waterfront.

Public taste moved away from monumental masonry, and demand for Trethewey's skills waned. A bas-relief for Nelson's cathedral steps was a late commission, but much of Trethewey's energy went into the making of clocks. After World War II, there was no demand for heroic stone memorials. Trethewey passed his company on to his children and grandchildren, and these days Trethewey Artisan Stone is a major supplier of stone kitchen bench tops in the South Island.

== Death ==
Having been a heavy smoker and having worked in stone dust environments, Trethewey developed emphysema. He died on 4 May 1956 in Christchurch. He was buried on 7 May at Bromley Cemetery. His wife died in 1975. The family grave holds William and Ivy Trethewey, and his parents, Jabez (1851–1935) and Mary (1855–1944).
