= Bromley Cemetery =

Cemetery in Christchurch, New Zealand

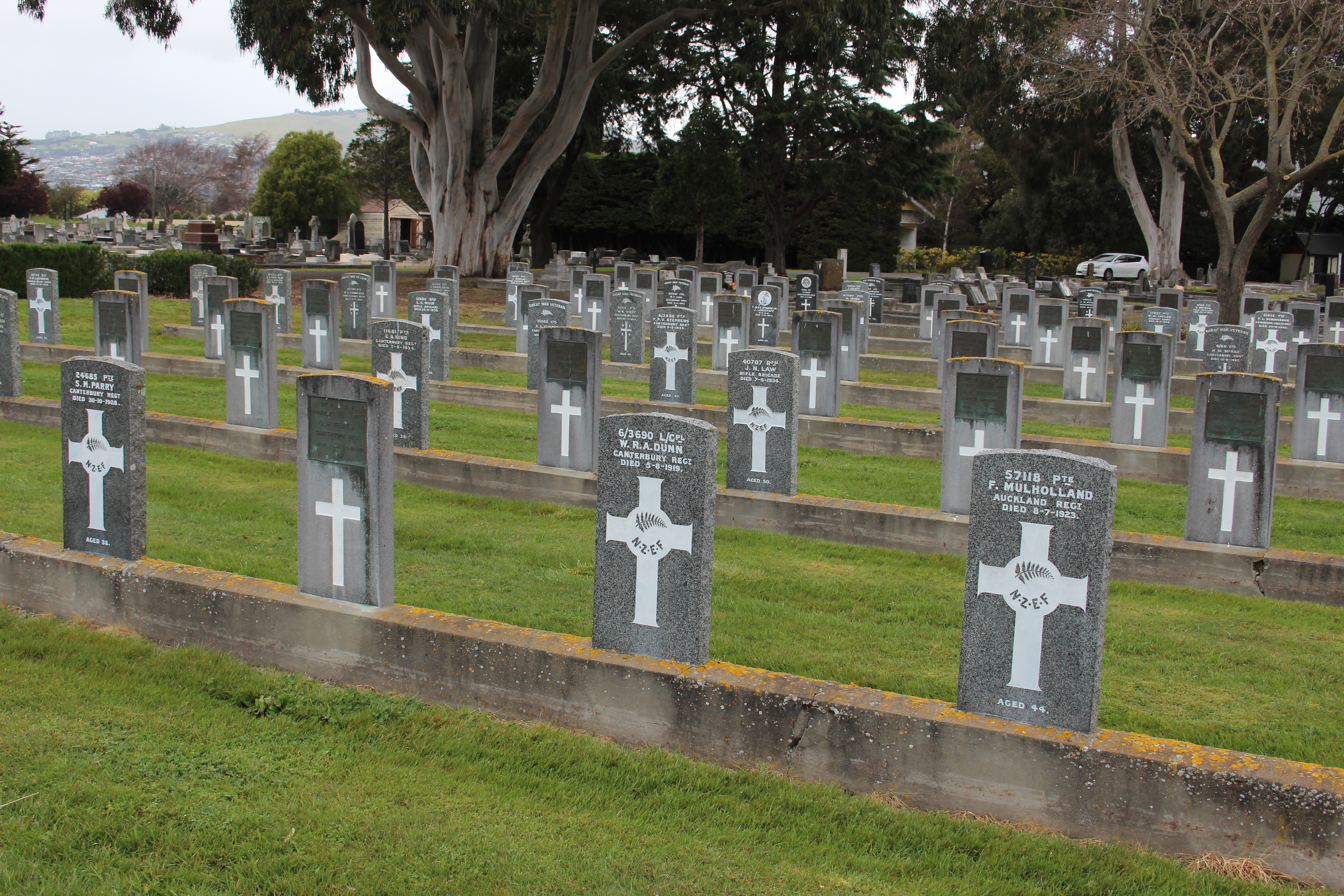
- Graves of the New Zealand Expeditionary Force (NZEF)
- Interactive map of Bromley Cemetery

Details
- Location: Christchurch
- Country: New Zealand
- Coordinates: 43.5387°S 172.6863°E
- No. of interments: >28,000
- Website: Official website

Bromley Cemetery is a cemetery in Christchurch, New Zealand. It occupies approximately 10 hectares to the east of the city centre, on the corner of Keighleys Road and Linwood Avenue. The Christchurch City Council maintains and administers the cemetery.

== History ==
The Christchurch City Council searched for additional cemetery land beginning in 1913, and opened Bromley Cemetery for burials in July 1918. Later that year the cemetery became the main burial place for fatalities of the 1918 flu pandemic from the eastern side of the city.

The cemetery has two rows of Royal New Zealand Returned and Services' Association (RSA) interments, and the Commonwealth War Graves Commission (CWGC) has records of 109 burials at Bromley, 15 from World War I and 94 from World War II. In addition, the CWGC commemorates 33 Commonwealth service personnel cremated at Bromley Crematorium during World War II. On the eve of Anzac Day 2008, over 160 headstones of veterans were painted over for maintenance to improve the inscriptions, which received criticism from visitors and the RSA due to the timing.

The cemetery is full and only accepts burials to existing plots or ash interments.

== Notable burials ==
- John Beanland (1866–1943), 36th Mayor of Christchurch
- Annette Clifford (1881–1968), Christchurch property owner and landlord
- H. H. Clifford (1872–1949), photographer
- Ted Howard (1868–1939), Labour Party MP
- Mabel Howard (1894–1972), Labour Party MP
- Arthur Rhodes (1859–1922), member of parliament and 24th Mayor of Christchurch
- William Trethewey (1892–1956), sculptor and monumental mason
