= Wharetiki House =

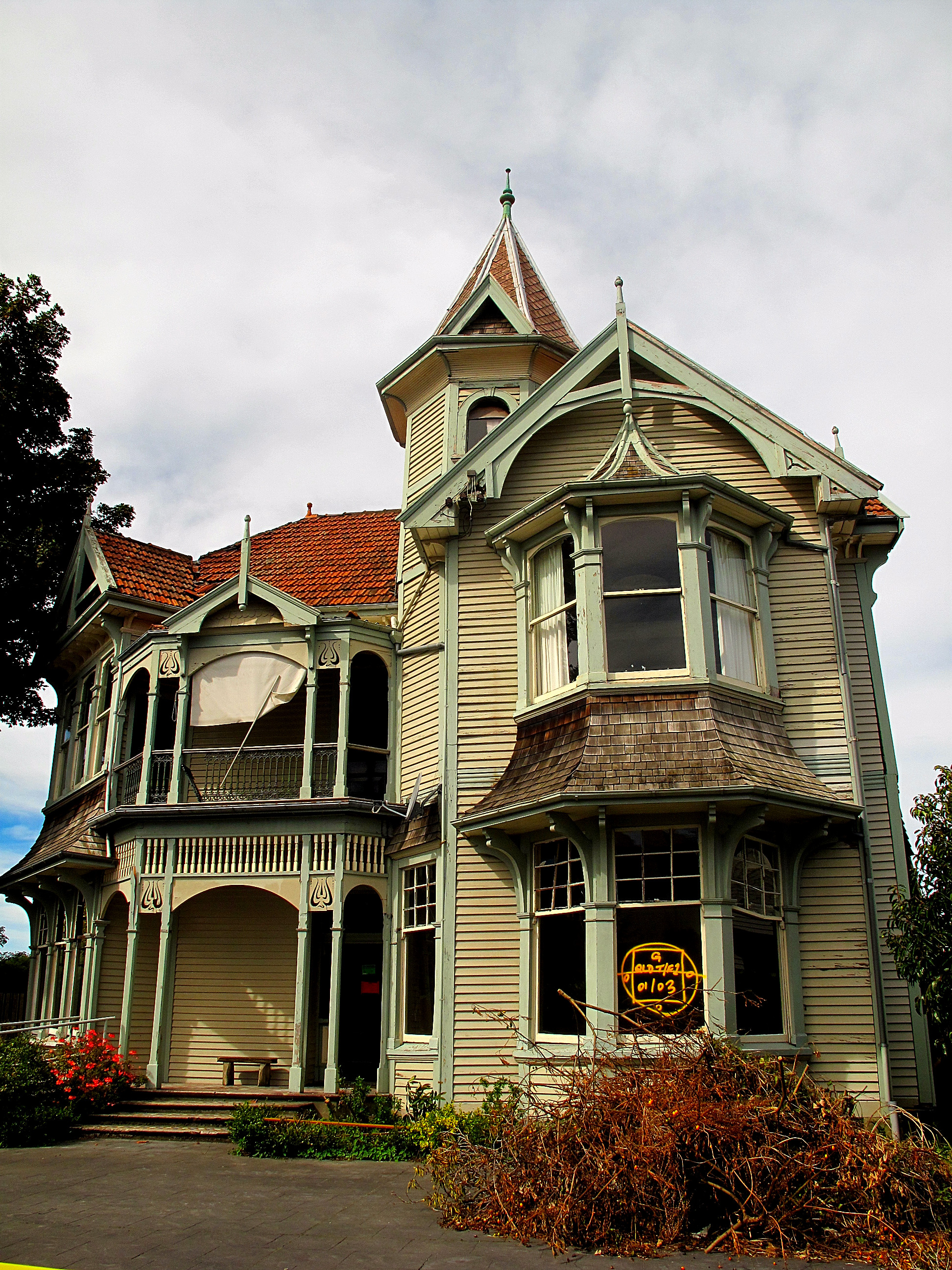
- Wharetiki House in March 2011
- Interactive map of the Wharetiki House area

General information
- Type: Residential, converted to a pre-school
- Location: Christchurch Central City, 854 Colombo Street, Christchurch, New Zealand
- Coordinates: 43.52402°S 172.63697°E
- Completed: 1904
- Demolished: 21 July 2011
- Client: Matthew Barnett
- Owner: David Hampton

Technical details
- Floor count: two

Heritage New Zealand – Category 2
- Official name: Wharetiki
- Designated: 25 June 2004
- Reference no.: 7551

References
- "Wharetiki". New Zealand Heritage List/Rārangi Kōrero. Heritage New Zealand.

Wharetiki, for some time known as Glenfell House, was an Edwardian timber dwelling in Colombo Street, Christchurch in New Zealand. Built in 1904 for businessman and philanthropist Matthew Barnett, it was damaged in the February 2011 Christchurch earthquake. After the Canterbury Earthquake Recovery Authority ordered the demolition of the Category II heritage building registered by Heritage New Zealand, it was the first court challenge of CERA's post-earthquake powers. In July 2011, the High Court decided in the authority's favour and the building was demolished the following day.

== History ==
Matthew Frank Barnett (1859–1935) was a successful bookmaker from Christchurch. He ran his betting business with his friend Peter Grant.

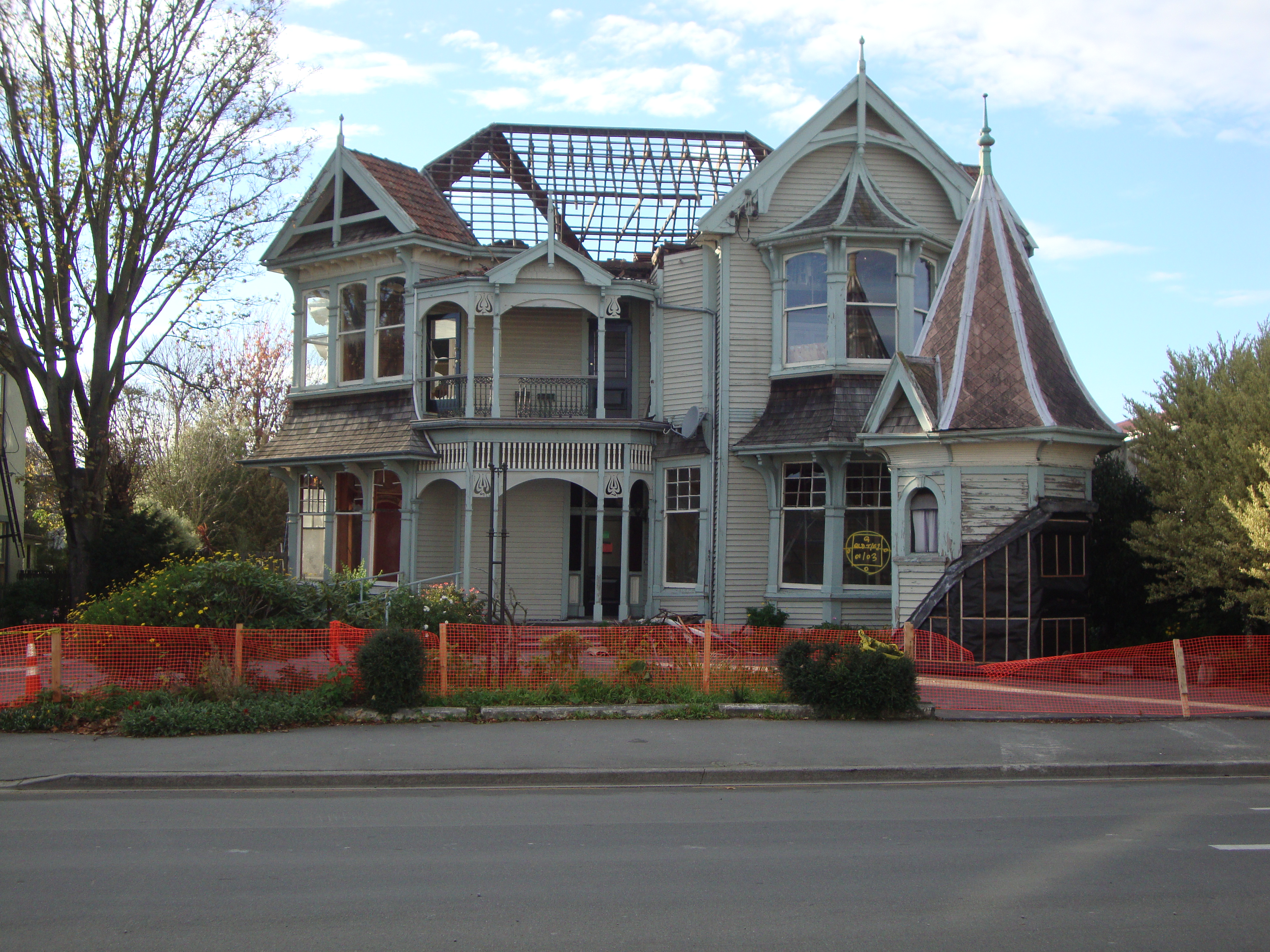
Wharetiki House in May 2011

In July 1901, Barnett bought two adjoining parcels of land (Lot 3 & 4, Deposited Plan 1147) from Henry Layton Bowker. The overall property was roughly square and fronted onto Colombo and Salisbury Streets, a location in the north of the Christchurch Central City. According to records held by the valuation department, construction of the house started in 1902. The house was built on Lot 3 of the property (the northern section), and Lot 4, facing Salisbury Street, had a garage and a bowling green. Construction was completed in 1904. The house was connected to the city drains in April 1904, but it was not until 1923 that electricity was supplied to the building. Water came initially from an artesian well on the property.

It is not known with certainty who the architect was, but evidence points towards Robert England (1863–1908). At the time, architectural pattern books were common, but the Wharetiki design has not been found. England, on the other hand, has designed houses of similar style, most importantly for Barnett's friend and business partner Grant, who in about 1906 had Westhaven Eventide Home built at 901 Colombo Street, i.e. in the immediate neighbourhood. Closer to Art Nouveau in style than the Arts and Craft style of Wharetiki, it nevertheless had the same style turret incorporated into the design.

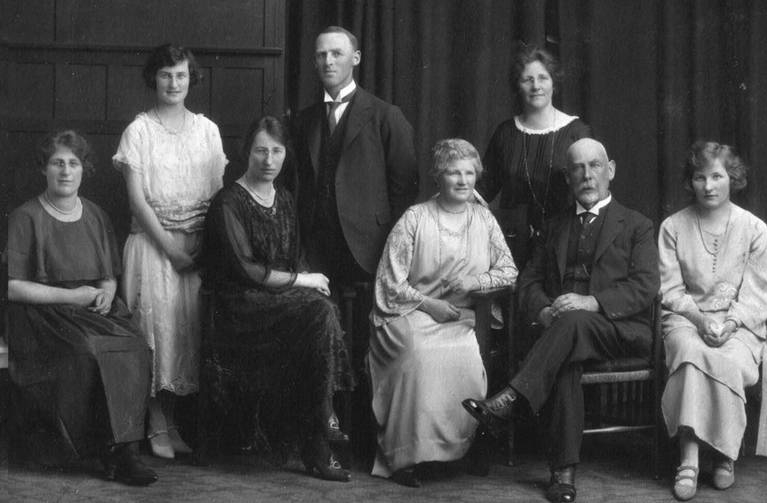
The Barnett family – standing from left: Tui, Olly, Ethel – sitting from left: Alice May (Topsy), Ivy, Mary (née Whelan), Matthew, Kate

Wharetiki was a large and representative dwelling, displaying the wealth of its owner. Barnett was married to Mary (née Whelan) and they had six children, born between 1889 and 1903. The house had several servants and Mary Barnett's unmarried younger sister Maria (known as Polly) was in charge of them. The house had a total floor area of 408 square metres (4,390 sq ft), which made for comfortable living.

Mary Barnett's father died in 1908 and her mother Margaret, together with her second youngest son Bill, moved to Christchurch to live at Wharetiki, too. Margaret Whelan lived there for the rest of her life and she died at Wharetiki in 1926. Mary Barnett fell ill in 1930 and was confined to a wheel chair. The back stairs of Wharetiki House were replaced with a lift at that stage, so that she could move around the house. Mary Barnett died on 1 March 1931 at Wharetiki, aged 66. Matthew Barnett died on 28 January 1935, aged 75, also at Wharetiki. He was buried next to his wife the following day.

== Other owners ==
After Barnett's death, the house was inherited by three family members: his brother Arthur, his oldest son Olly Barnett, and his wife's sister Maria (Polly) Whelan. They immediately employed auctioneer H. G. Livinstone & Co to sell the property and all furnishings, with the date for auction set as 14 May 1935. It was sold to the widow Margaret Isabella Marshall, who appears not to have lived in the building herself. She onsold the house in 1942 to Ernest Archbold, who in turn sold the building to Robert Heaton Livingstone in the following year.

Probably under Archbold's ownership, the house was used by the Glenfell sisters (Jean, Reynolda and Ellen) as a boarding house for pupils from Christchurch Girls' High School, who at the time used a building later known as the Cranmer Centre as their school. The connection with the girls school lasted for four years. The building became known as Glenfell House during that time. The ownership of the property kept changing. From Livinstone, the property passed to the Public Trustee in 1957, who onsold to the Staffordshire Finance Company in 1964. It is likely that at that point, the Glenfell connection with the house finished.

The house change owners again in 1973, when Peter John Diver and David Stephen Diver took over. They sold the property to Sunset Properties. The owner of that company (Mr Merrett) was a son of the owner of the Staffordshire Finance Company. There was a brief period in the 1980s when the house was operated as Grenville Guesthouse, but for the remaining time, it was a boarding house.

In 1995, the property was purchased by Chesterfield Preschools Ltd, who operated a pre-school on the ground floor. The owner of that company is David Hampton, who is still the current owner of the property.

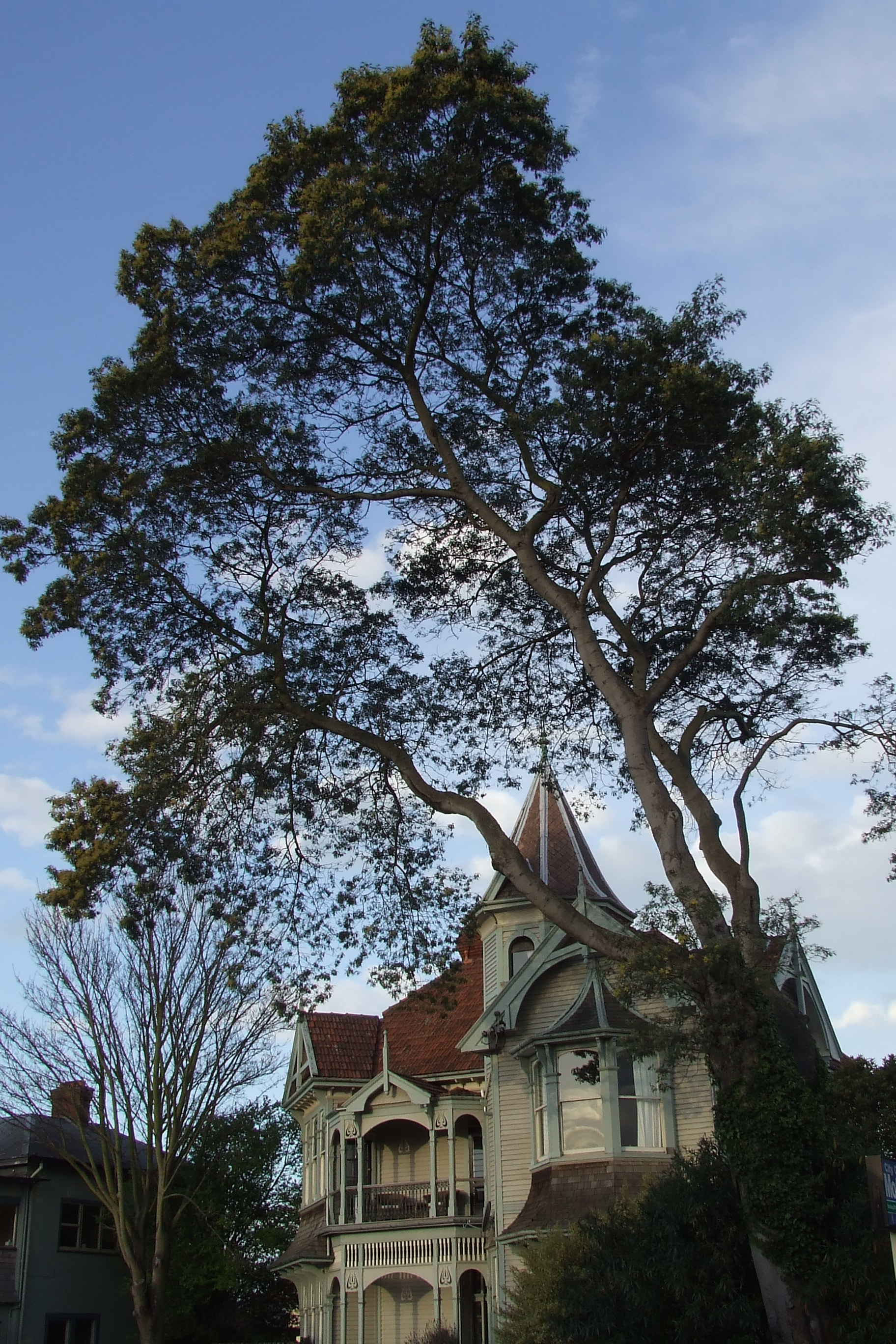
Wharetiki house in 2006

== 2010 and 2011 earthquakes ==
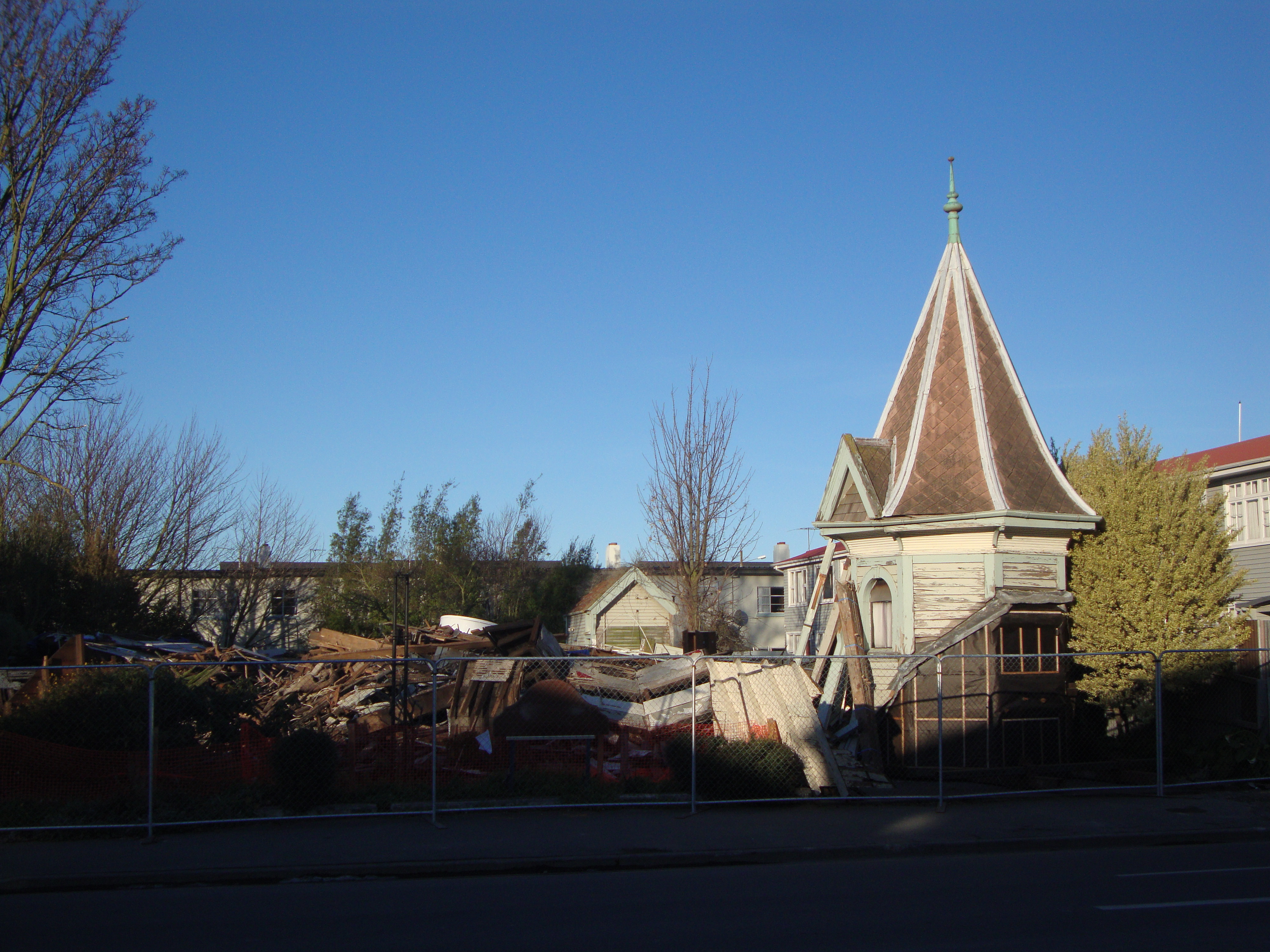
Wharetiki after demolition, with only the turret sitting in the garden

The building suffered some damage in the 2010 Canterbury earthquake, and severe damage in the February 2011 Christchurch earthquake. According to the owner, it was not further damaged in the June 2011 Christchurch earthquake. The Canterbury Earthquake Recovery Authority (CERA) assessed the building several times and eventually ordered its demolition, with the building included on the demolition list in early April. The demolition order was challenged by the owner, who took the case to the High Court. It was the first time that CERA's power to order the demolition of a building had been challenged in the courts. Justice Whata dismissed the challenge on 20 June 2011, and the building was demolished the following day.

== Heritage registration ==
Wharetiki House was registered by the New Zealand Historic Places Trust as a Category II heritage building on 25 June 2004 with registration number 7551.
