= The Four Avenues =

Major boulevards in Christchurch, NZ

Coordinates: 43°31′15″S 172°39′00″E

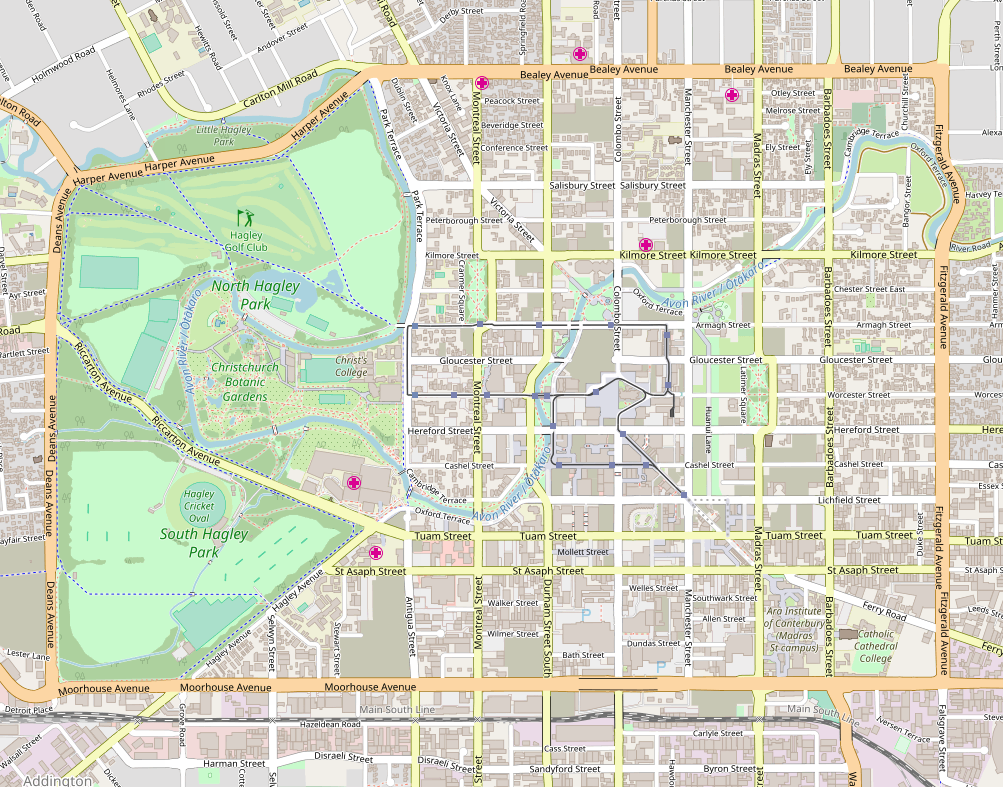
An OpenStreetMap screenshot of central Christchurch, showing the Four Avenues in pale orange.

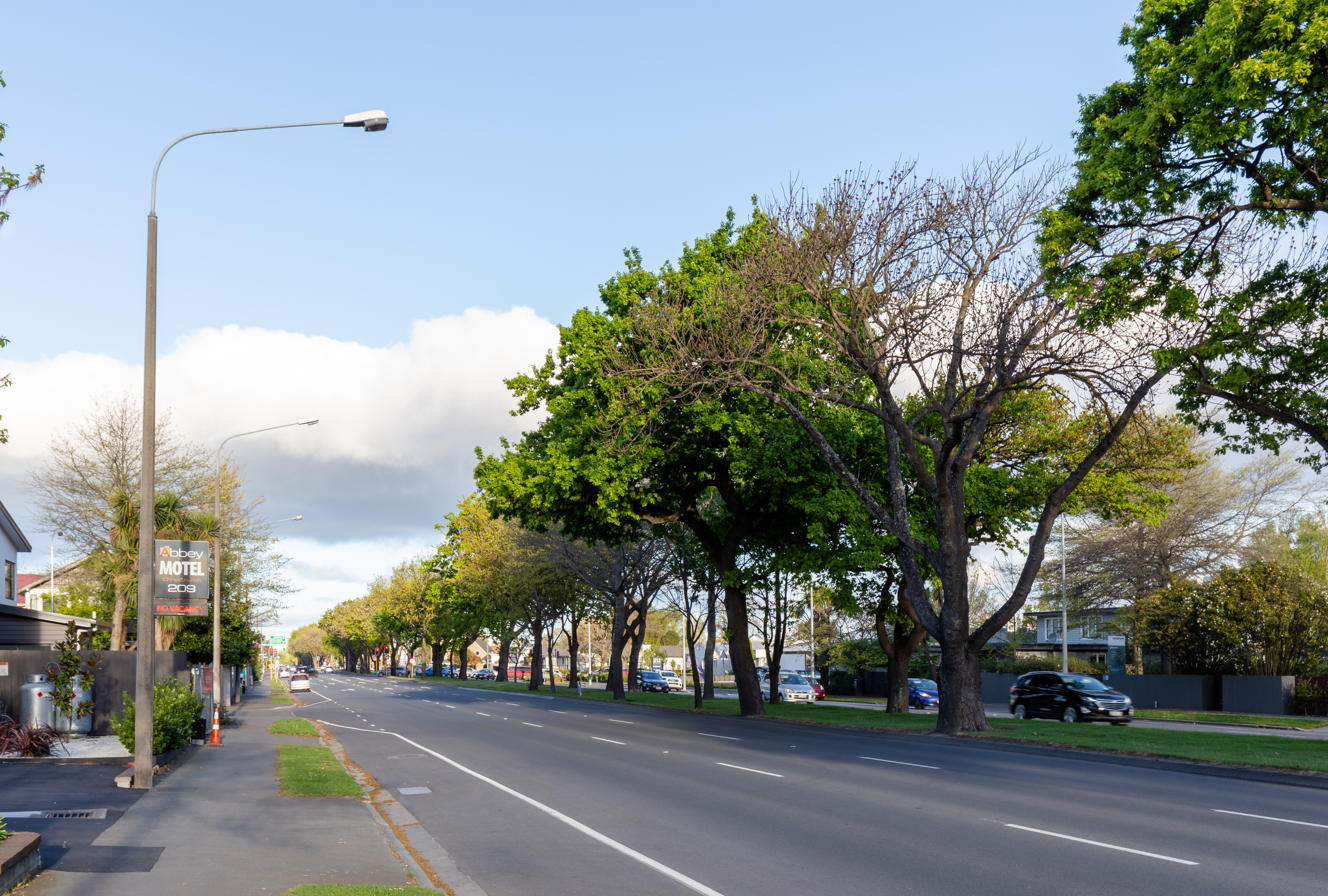
Bealey Avenue

The Four Avenues are a group of four major arterial boulevards — Bealey Avenue, Fitzgerald Avenue, Moorhouse Avenue, and Deans Avenue — that surround the city centre of Christchurch, New Zealand. Serving as an inner ring road, they popularly form the limits of the city centre, separating it from the city's suburbs. Almost all of the city's commercial heart lies within the approximately rectangular 9.8-square-kilometre (3.8 sq mi) area formed by the four avenues. The term "within the Four Avenues" is used in Christchurch to refer to the inner city.

Historically, the avenues were known as the Belts. Technically, there are five, not four, avenues, as Deans Avenue does not connect directly with Bealey Avenue, the two being connected by the shorter Harper Avenue, which skirts the northern edge of Hagley Park. Occasionally Rolleston Avenue is described as one of the "Four Avenues". It was part of Antigua Street until 1903 when a portion of Antigua Street was renamed Rolleston Avenue following the death of William Rolleston.

The avenues were named after prominent early Christchurch settlers (Samuel Bealey, John and William Deans, James FitzGerald, and William Sefton Moorhouse) with the exception of Harper Avenue (formerly Park Road) which was renamed in 1931 to honour retiring Christchurch Domains Board chairman Sir George Harper.

== Geography ==
Deans Avenue forms the western edge of the Four Avenues, separating Hagley Park from the major inner suburb of Riccarton. It runs due north–south for approximately 2.2 kilometres (1.4 mi), with its northern end connecting with the curving Harper Ave. This road runs approximately east-northeast for 1.4 kilometres (0.87 mi) before connecting with the western end of Bealey Avenue.

The straight Bealey Avenue continues east for 2.4 kilometres (1.5 mi). This wide, leafy dual carriageway skirts the edges of the suburbs of Merivale and Edgeware. At approximately its halfway point it is crossed by Christchurch's main street, Colombo Street. Bealey Avenue reaches its end at a junction with the northern end of Fitzgerald Avenue.

After initially curving slightly to follow the banks of the Avon River / Ōtākaro, Fitzgerald Avenue leads due south, crossing the suburban ends of major inner Christchurch streets such as Gloucester Street and Hereford Street. To the avenue's east lies the suburb of Linwood. After 2.7 kilometres (1.7 mi) the avenue ends at a junction with Moorhouse Avenue.

Moorhouse Avenue runs east–west for 3.8 kilometres (2.4 mi), connecting the ends of Fitzgerald and Deans Avenues. It too is crossed by Colombo Street. The most urban of the four avenues, this dual carriageway lacks the tree-lined nature of the other avenues as it passes between the city centre and light industrial and commercial areas such as Sydenham and Addington.

Major routes crossing the four avenues, other than the inner Christchurch streets already mentioned, include (clockwise from the southern end of Deans Avenue):

- Riccarton Road, which leads through the satellite commercial hub of Riccarton and connects with main routes south out of the city;
- Riccarton Avenue, which traverses Hagley Park to connect with the city centre;
- Fendalton Road, leading northwest from Harper Avenue to link with Memorial Avenue, which leads to Christchurch International Airport;
- Papanui Road, leading northwest from Bealey Avenue, and linking with routes north out of the city;
- Sherborne Street, leading north from Bealey Avenue to link with Cranford Street, which provides direct access to the Christchurch Northern Motorway
- Ferry Road, which leads east-southeast to link with Christchurch's coastal suburbs and with the Lyttelton Road Tunnel.

== Major intersections ==
Clockwise from the south-west:

Location	km	mi	Destinations	Notes
Addington / City Centre boundary	0	0.0	Detroit Place; Blenheim Road to SH 76 west / SH 1 south / SH 73 – Timaru, West Coast	Moorhouse Avenue becomes Deans Avenue
Riccarton / City Centre boundary	1.3	0.81	Riccarton Road – Riccarton; Riccarton Avenue – City Centre, Hospital	
Riccarton / City Centre boundary	1.5	0.93	Kilmarnock Street	
Fendalton / City Centre boundary	1.8	1.1	Fendalton Road – Fendalton, Airport	Deans Avenue becomes Harper Avenue
Merivale / City Centre boundary	2.8	1.7	Avon River / Ōtākaro	
Merivale / City Centre boundary	2.9	1.8	Carlton Mill Road – Bryndwr; Park Terrace – City Centre	Harper Avenue becomes Bealey Avenue
Merivale / City Centre boundary	3.1	1.9	Papanui Road; Victoria Street	
St Albans / City Centre boundary	3.3	2.1	Montreal Street	no entry (one-way street)
St Albans / City Centre boundary	3.5	2.2	Durham Street North – City Centre via one-way system	
St Albans / City Centre boundary	3.8	2.4	Colombo Street	
St Albans / City Centre boundary	3.9	2.4	Sherborne Street to SH 74 north – St Albans, Picton	
St Albans / City Centre boundary	4.0	2.5	Manchester Street	
St Albans / City Centre boundary	4.3	2.7	Madras Street	no entry southbound (one-way street)
Edgeware / City Centre boundary	4.5	2.8	Barbadoes Street north – St Albans; Barbadoes Street south – City Centre via one-way system	
Edgeware / Richmond / City Centre tripoint	4.9	3.0	Whitmore Street – Shirley, Mairehau; London Street – Richmond	Bealey Avenue becomes Fitzgerald Avenue
Richmond / City Centre boundary	5.6	3.5	Avon River / Ōtākaro	
Linwood / City Centre boundary	5.7	3.5	Avonside Drive – Avonside, New Brighton; Kilmore Street	
Linwood / City Centre boundary	5.8	3.6	Armagh Street	
Linwood / City Centre boundary	5.9	3.7	Gloucester Street	
Linwood / City Centre boundary	6.1	3.8	Worcester Street	
Linwood / City Centre boundary	6.2	3.9	Hereford Street east – Linwood; Hereford Street west – City Centre	
Linwood / City Centre boundary	6.3	3.9	Cashel Street	
Phillipstown / City Centre boundary	6.4	4.0	Lichfield Street	no entry (one-way street)
Phillipstown / City Centre boundary	6.6	4.1	Tuam Street	Staggered T-intersection
Phillipstown / City Centre boundary	6.7	4.2	St Asaph Street east – Phillipstown; St Asaph Street west – City Centre, Hospital	
Waltham / City Centre boundary	6.9	4.3	Ferry Road – Lyttelton, Sumner	
Waltham / City Centre boundary	7.1	4.4	Moorhouse Avenue – Woolston, Sumner; Falsgrave Street – Waltham	Fitzgerald Avenue becomes Moorhouse Avenue
Waltham / Sydenham / City Centre tripoint	7.5	4.7	Waltham Road to SH 76 east – Lyttelton; Barbadoes Street	no entry to Barbadoes Street (one-way street)
Sydenham / City Centre boundary	7.7	4.8	Gasson Street – Sydenham; Madras Street – City Centre via one-way system	
Sydenham / City Centre boundary	8.0	5.0	Pilgrim Place; Manchester Street	
Sydenham / City Centre boundary	8.2	5.1	Colombo Street	
Sydenham / City Centre boundary	8.4	5.2	Durham Street South – Sydenham	no entry northbound (one-way street)
Sydenham / City Centre boundary	8.7	5.4	Montreal Street – City Centre via one-way system	
Addington / City Centre boundary	8.0	5.0	Antigua Street	
Addington / City Centre boundary	9.4	5.8	Selwyn Street – Hospital	
Addington / City Centre boundary	9.7	6.0	Grove Road; Lincoln Road to SH 75 – Addington, Halswell, Akaroa; Hagley Avenue	no entry to Hagley Avenue (one-way street)
Addington / City Centre boundary	10.1	6.3	Detroit Place; Blenheim Road to SH 76 west / SH 1 south / SH 73 – Timaru, West Coast	Moorhouse Avenue becomes Deans Avenue
1.000 mi = 1.609 km; 1.000 km = 0.621 mi: Incomplete access; Route transition
