= Harper Avenue =

Harper Avenue may refer to:

== Places ==
- Harper Avenue (Chicago), Illinois, US
- Harper Avenue (Detroit), Michigan, US; see Harper Woods, Michigan
- Harper Avenue (Los Angeles), West Hollywood, California, US
  - North Harper Avenue Historic District, West Hollywood; see National Register of Historic Places listings in Los Angeles County, California
- Harper Avenue, Christchurch, New Zealand

== Other ==
- Harper Avenue, an imprint of HarperCollins Canada
