= Cranmer Square =

Park in Christchurch, New Zealand

Coordinates: 43°31′42″S 172°37′50″E

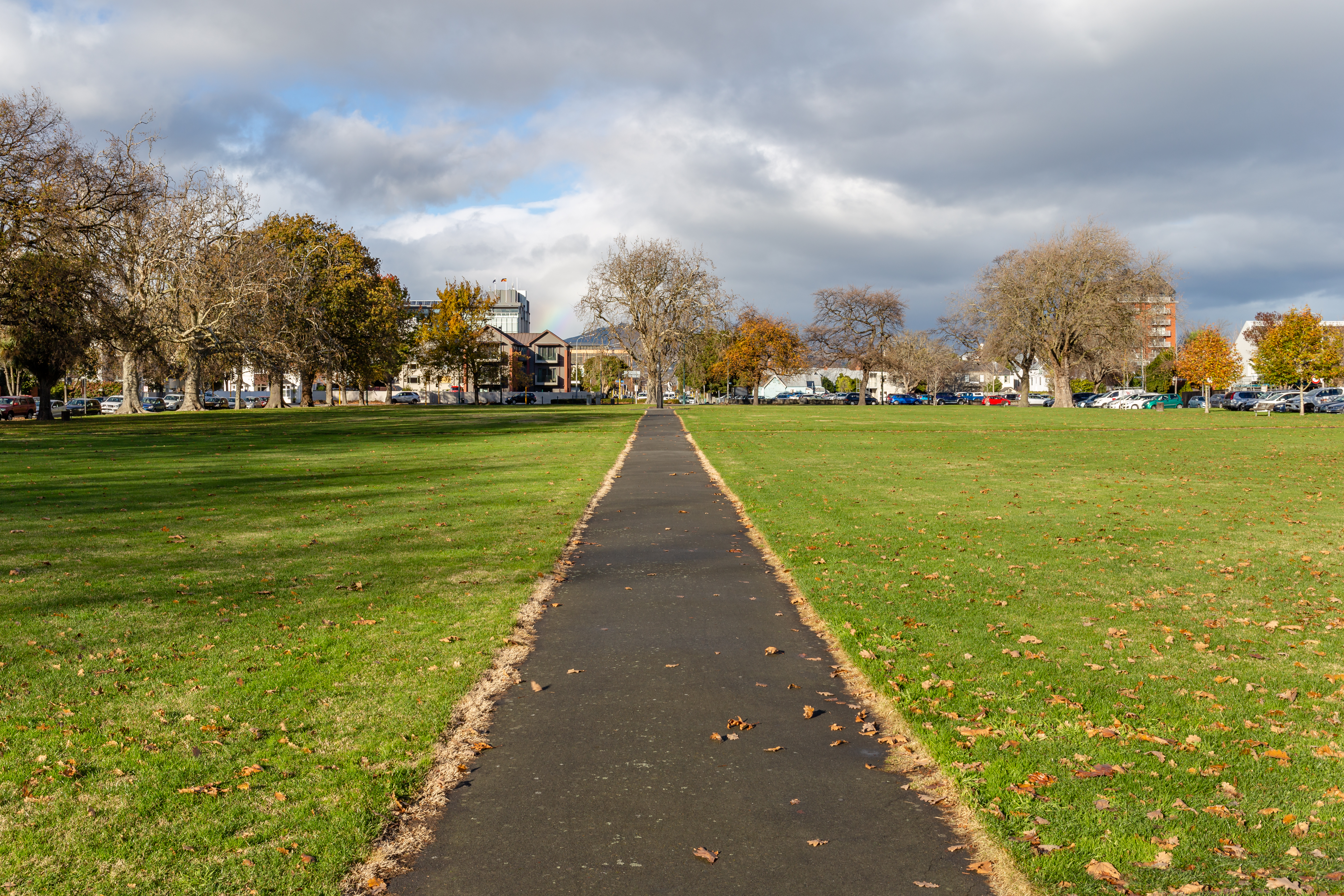
Cranmer Square, Christchurch, New Zealand

Cranmer Square is an urban park in central Christchurch, New Zealand. It is located 800 metres (870 yd) northwest of the city's centre, Cathedral Square. The major arterial route of Montreal Street skirts the edge of the square. The square (actually a rectangle) is grassed and crossed by concrete paths and edged by mature trees. It covers an area of 1.9 hectares (4.7 acres).

== History ==
Like its near neighbour Latimer Square, Cranmer Square was named for an early protestant martyr, Bishop Thomas Cranmer. Cranmer Square was part of the original design of Christchurch when it was surveyed between 1849 and 1850 by Edward Jollie. Cranmer Square was used as a sports ground with cricket, soccer and hockey being played there. The Christchurch Normal School and the Christchurch Girls High School both used it as part of their school grounds.

The first rugby game played in New Zealand may have occurred on Cranmer Square in 1863 between Christ’s College and the ‘Gentlemen of Christchurch’. It has also been suggested that this game was actually played at Latimer Square.

Celebrations for the first successful trans-Tasman air flight, by Charles Kingsford Smith, were held in Cranmer Square in late 1928.

As a result of the damage to Christchurch Cathedral in the 2011 Canterbury earthquakes, Cranmer Square has been used as the venue for Returned Servicemen's Association commemorations. It was proposed in August 2020 to move the Citizens’ War Memorial from Cathedral Square to Cranmer Square. It was supported by Heritage New Zealand at that time. In October 2020, a resource consent had yet to be submitted to enable this to occur.

Cranmer Square was covered in white crosses on ANZAC days between 2015 and 2018 honouring the servicemen and women who died in WWI in 1915.

== Notable buildings ==
A number of buildings surrounding Cranmer Square were destroyed in the earthquakes of 2011. There have been a number of buildings that have gone up in their place.

=== Cranmer Courts ===
The historic Cranmer Court building was located close to Cranmer Square until it was demolished in the aftermath of the 2011 Christchurch earthquake. The building had previously been a normal school, and in 1877 became the country's first teachers' training college. Celebrations for the first successful trans-Tasman air flight, by Charles Kingsford Smith, were held in Cranmer Square in late 1928.
