= Latimer Square =

Park in Christchurch, New Zealand

Coordinates: 43°31′50″S 172°38′35″E

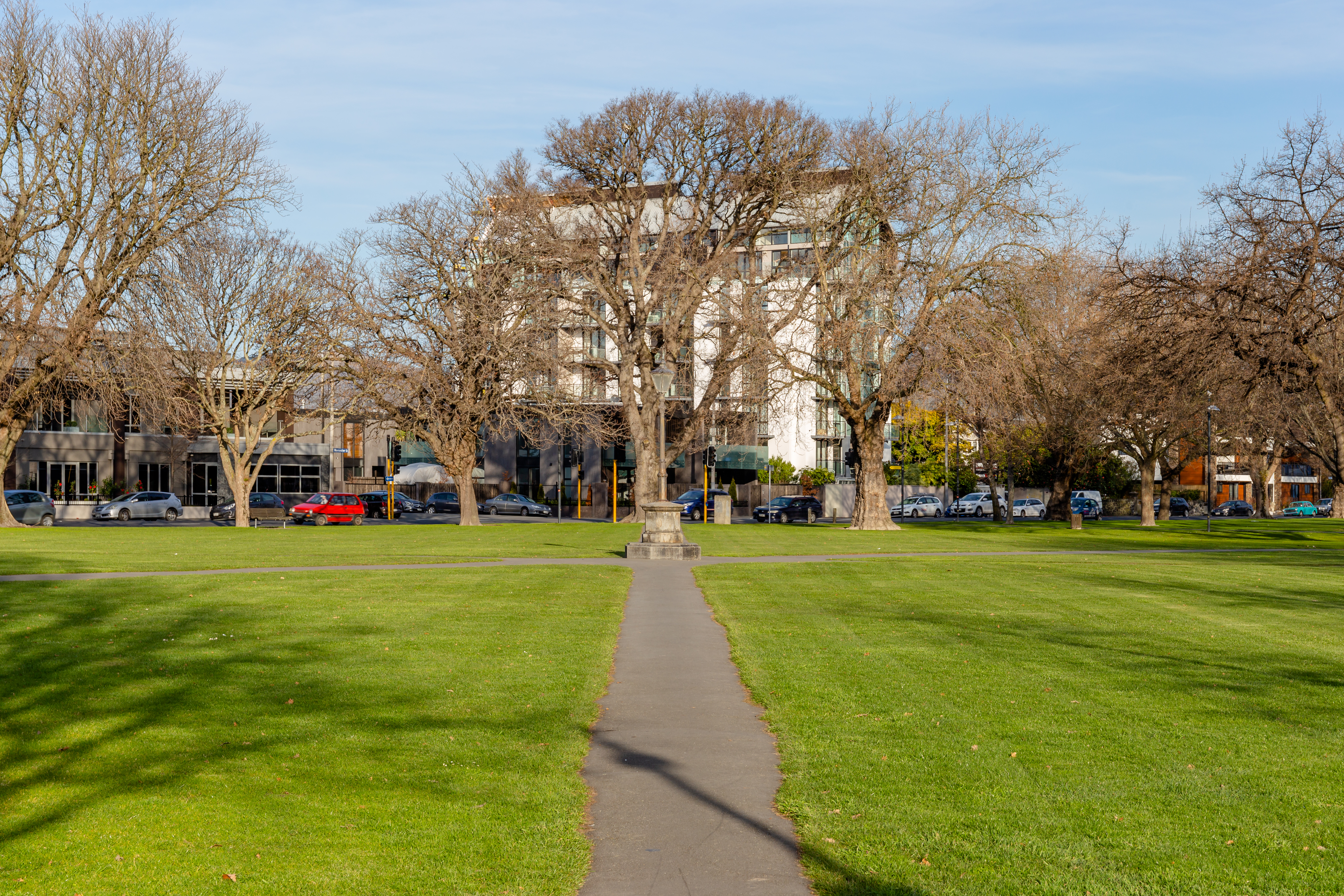
Latimer Square, Christchurch, New Zealand

Latimer Square is an urban park in central Christchurch, New Zealand. It is located 400 metres (440 yd) east of the city's centre, Cathedral Square. Many commemorative events take place in Latimer Square. The square lies between the major urban thoroughfares of Gloucester Street and Worcester Street. Madras Street runs north and south to Latimer Square. The square (actually a rectangle) is grassed and crossed by concrete paths and edged by mature trees. It covers an area of a little over 1.8 hectares (4.4 acres).

== History ==
Like its near neighbour Cranmer Square, Latimer Square was named for an early protestant martyr, Bishop Hugh Latimer. Latimer Square was part of the original design of Christchurch when it was surveyed between 1849 and 1850 by Edward Jollie.

Latimer Square was used for horse racing, sports events and the Agricultural and Pastoral (A & P) Show until the 1880s. Worcester Street was extended through Latimer Square in 1885 to allow the tram line to reach the centre of town. A band rotunda was built at this time and then removed in 1894.

The Prince of Wales attended a civic reception in Latimer Square in 1920. Air raid trenches were dug in Latimer Square during World War 2. The square was again closed off to Worcester Street in 2006. Latimer Square became a well known spot for prostitutes to walk the streets in pre-earthquake Christchurch.

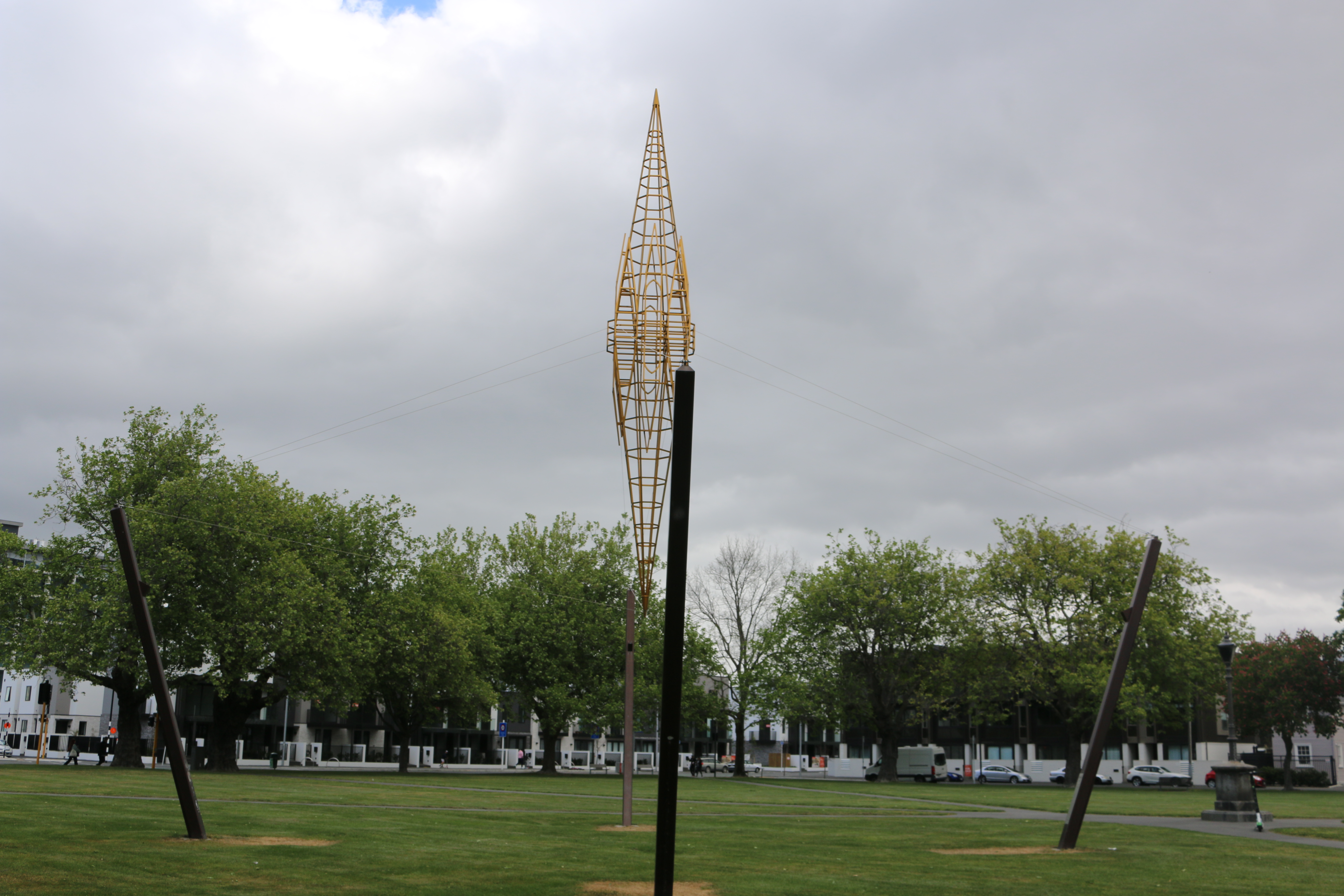
Sculpture entitled "Spires" by artist Neil Dawson, located in Latimer Square

The buildings around Latimer Square were badly damaged during the 2010 and 2011 Canterbury earthquakes and Latimer Square was used to triage the injured after the earthquake of 22 February 2011. The Duke and Duchess of Cambridge visited Latimer Square in April 2014 to help promote the 2015 Cricket World Cup. A sculpture, commemorating the loss of ChristChurch Cathedral in the 2011 earthquake was installed by its artist, Neil Dawson, in the square in 2014.

== Notable buildings ==
Many of the buildings which surrounded Latimer Square were either destroyed during, or demolished in the aftermath of, the 2011 Christchurch earthquake, among them:

=== Christchurch Transitional Cathedral ===
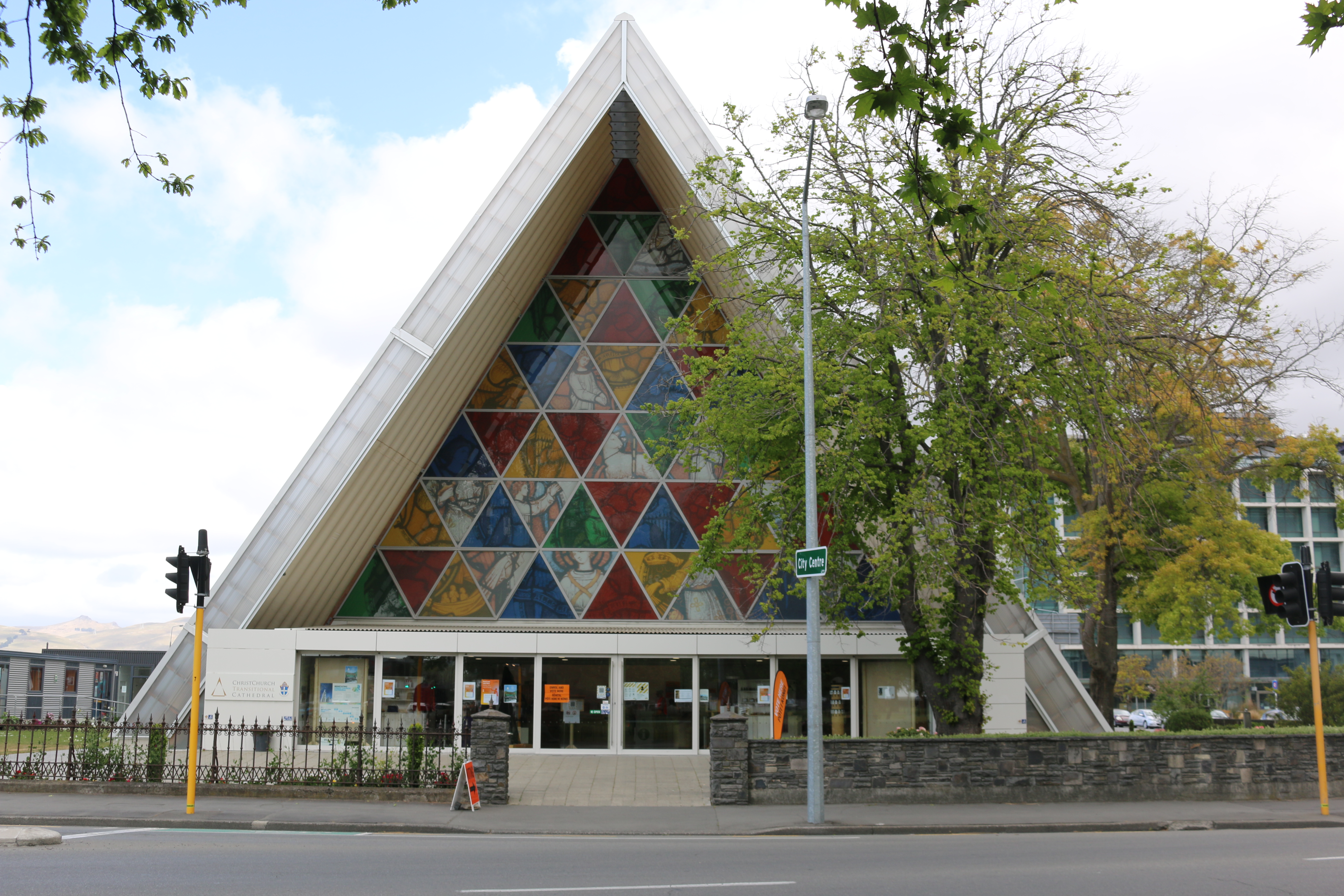
Christchurch Transitional Cathedral. Latimer Square

Since the earthquake, the square has been the site of the city's temporary Anglican Cathedral also known as the Cardboard Cathedral.

=== St John the Baptist Church ===
One of Christchurch's first stone churches, St John the Baptist Anglican church, was built south of the square in 1864. The architect was Maxwell Bury. The stone church had an octagonal tower. It had a congregation of 450 just prior to the earthquakes in 2010.

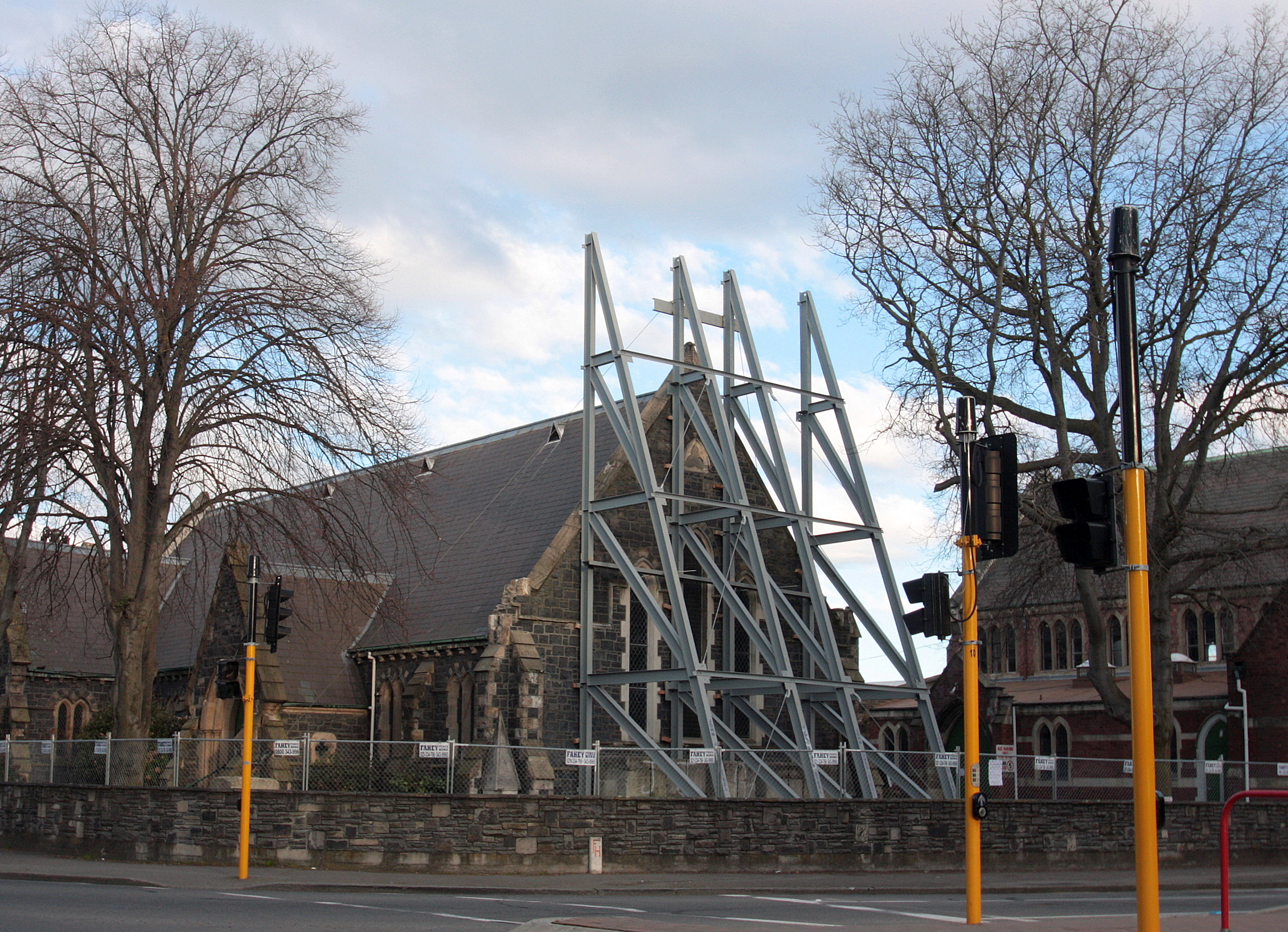
St John the Baptist Church, Latimer Square was significantly damaged in the Canterbury earthquakes and subsequently demolished.

=== Fletcher Building housing developments ===
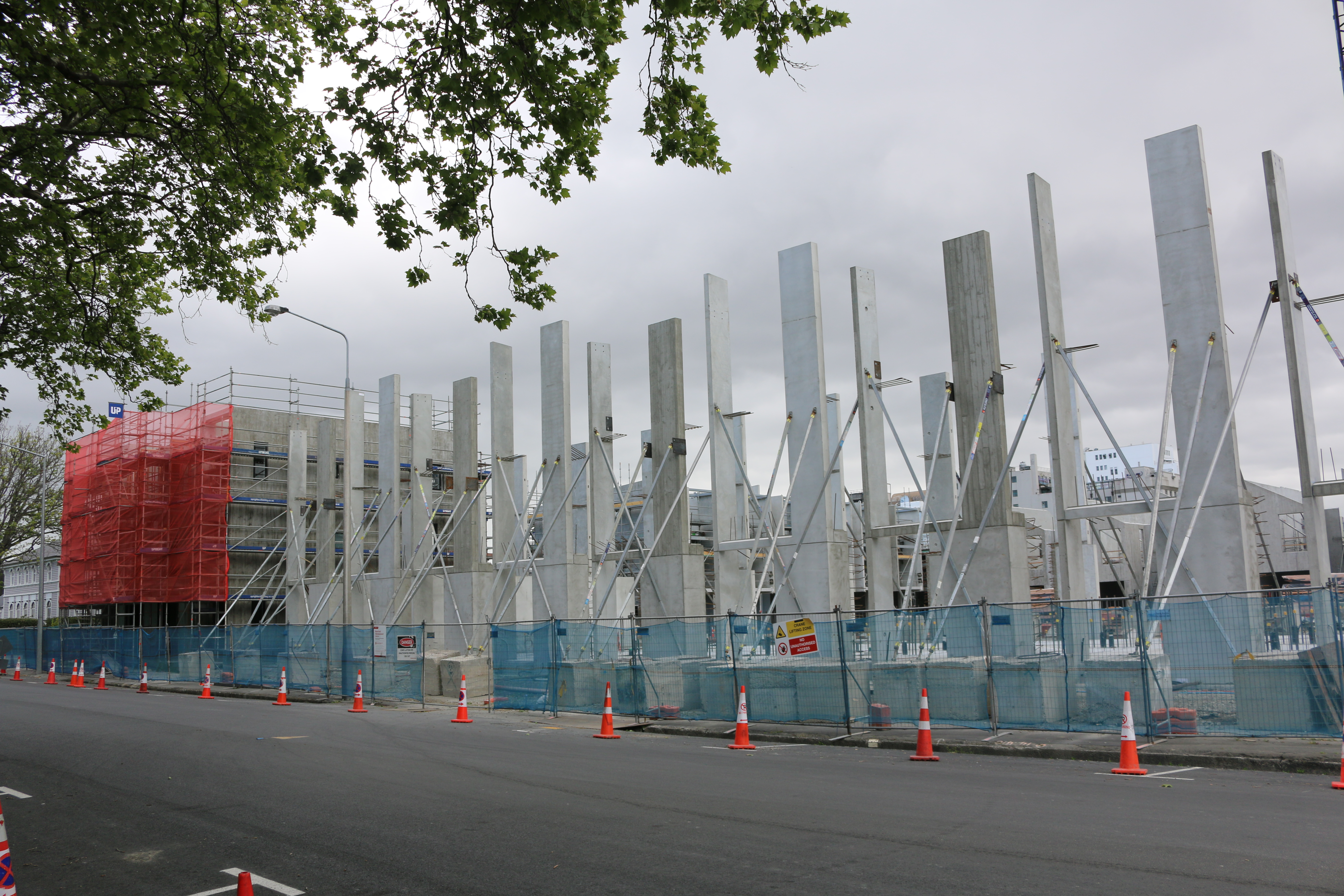
New apartments going up overlooking Latimer Square (October 2020)

With many of the buildings surrounding Latimer Square demolished, Fletcher Building won the tender to master plan and build housing in the area. With development continuing, initial sales have been reported to be slow in the media.

=== Christchurch Club ===
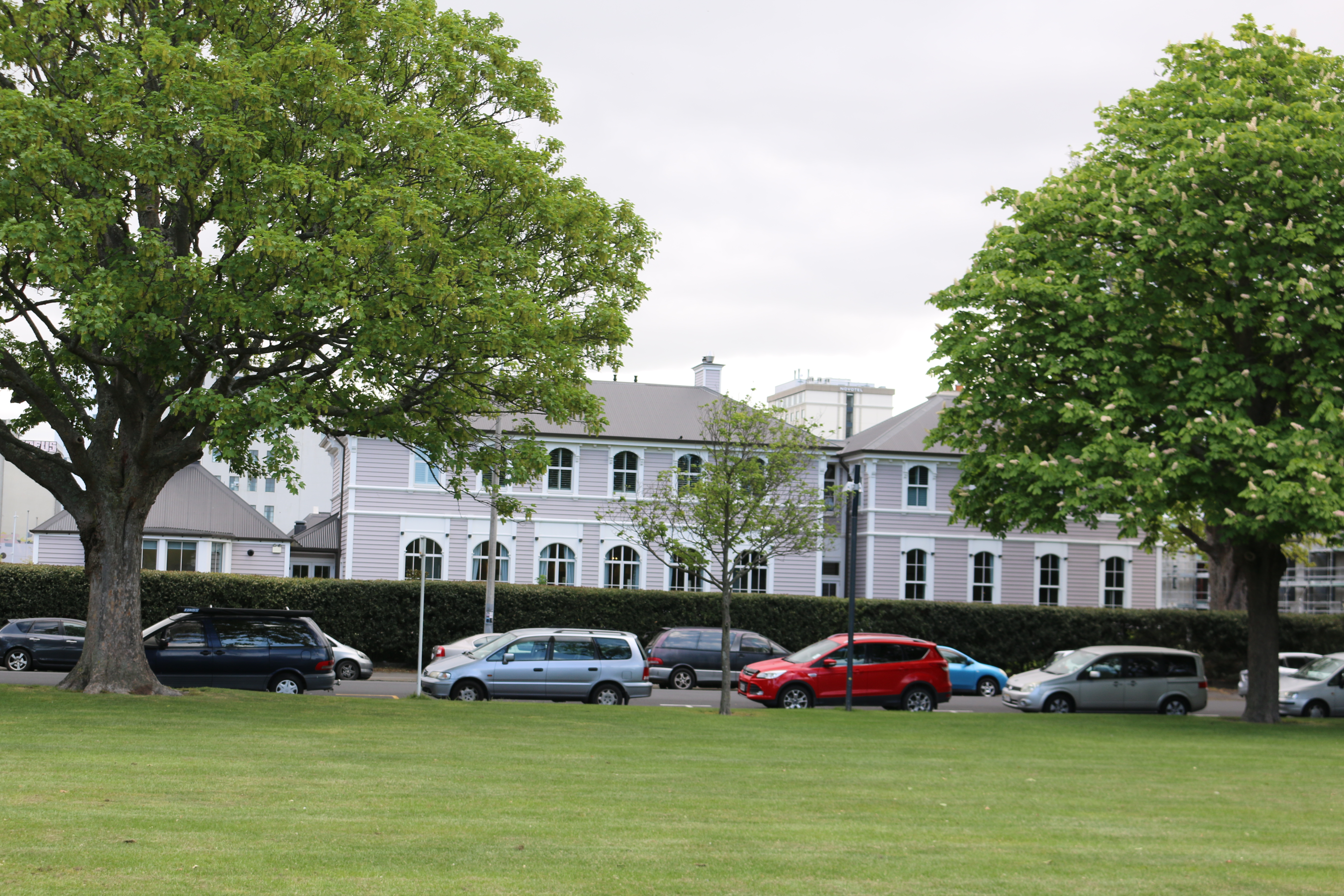
Christchurch Club, Latimer Square

The Christchurch Club's buildings, with repairs completed after the earthquake, are also located on Latimer Square. It is a category 1 historic place built in between 1861 and 1862.

=== Occidental Hotel ===
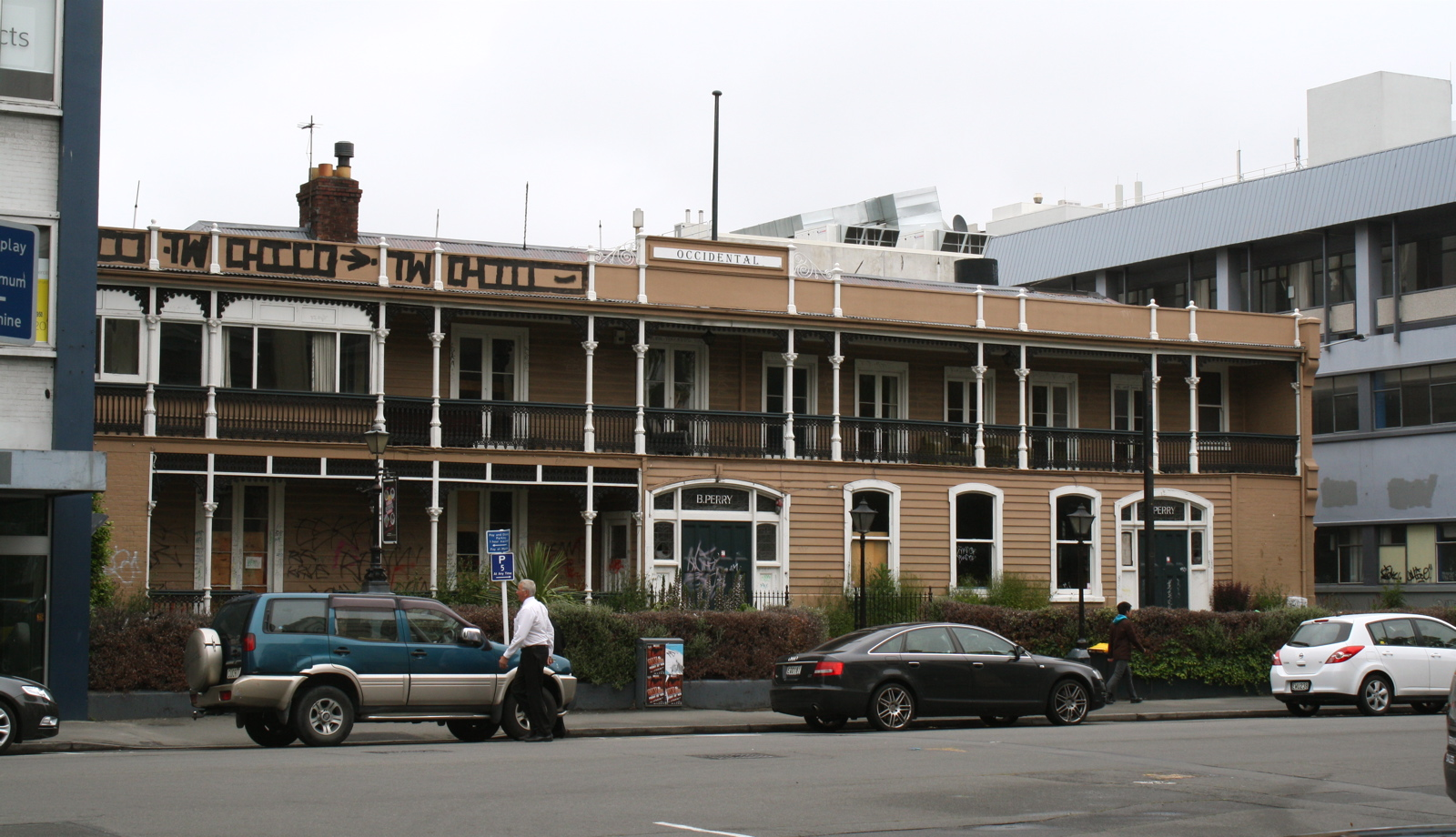
Occidental Hotel, in a neglected state (2009)

The Occidental Hotel (208 Hereford Street) was built in 1861. It was designed by Samuel Coleridge Farr. It was originally known as Collins' Family Hotel and Boarding House. In 1889, it became known as the Occidental. In 1982 the hotel was renovated. Sheppard and Rout (Architects) designed the refurbishment which included a lounge bar and restaurant. Flappers, a bar with a 1930s theme which opened in October 1985. In 1996, Flappers became the Bull Bar. In 1998 it was turned into a backpackers hotel. It became progressively run down and closed down in August 2006. It was demolished in 2011 after sustaining earthquake damage. The Occidental was registered as a Category II historic place (#1913)

=== Charlie B's Backpackers ===
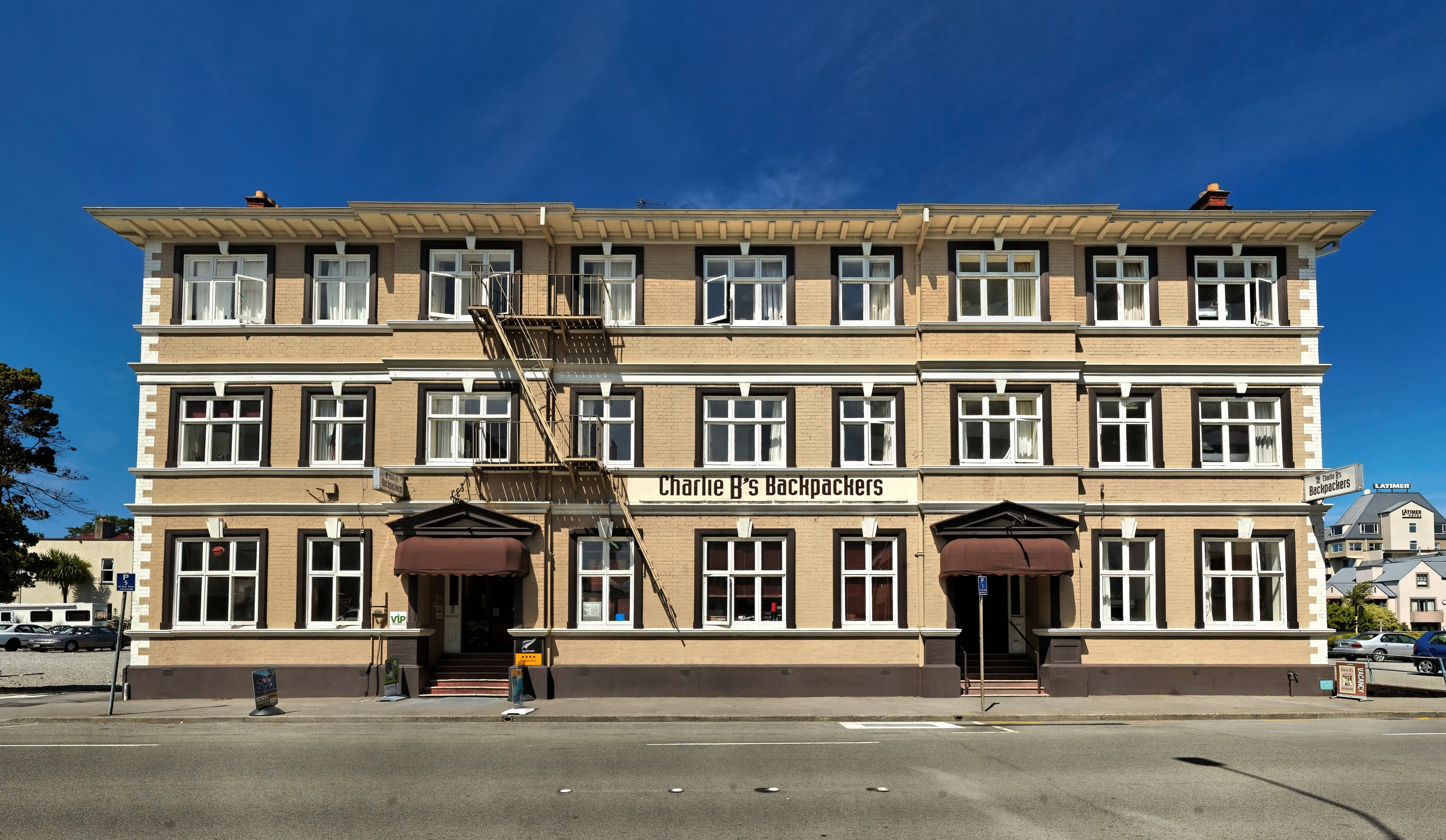
Charlie B's Backpackers. Sited on Latimer Square prior to being demolished.

Charlie B's sat at the northern end of Latimer Square. It was demolished after the Canterbury earthquakes. A competition was held for the design of replacement buildings for the site. The competition judging panel included Kevin McCloud from the UK television series Grand Designs. The competition was won by Italian architects Anselmi Attiani Architettura and engineers Cresco in 2013 to redevelop the site. Their plans stalled in 2015 with the Christchurch Central Development Unit (CCDU) declaring that the developers had failed to meet a deadline to secure the required funding for the project. Gerry Brownlee, the earthquake recovery minister said that the project for the $30 million urban village "should never have started in the first place". A second attempt in 2018 to redevelop the site occurred with the Ōtautahi Urban Guild chosen to develop the site. They had plans for a 150 home development and intended to offer properties for 10 to 20 per cent cheaper than those from private sector. Despite getting a loan of $450,000 from the Christchurch City Council in 2019 the development collapsed in December 2020. The site still remained vacant in 2020. In March 2021, it was announced that developers Mike Greer and Richard Peebles had purchased the land and planned to build more than 100 houses on the site. Work is expected to start later in 2021 on the site. There is expected to be a mix of two bedroom apartments built above retail space and three-bedroom townhouses which will surround a communal garden space.

=== Park Tower ===
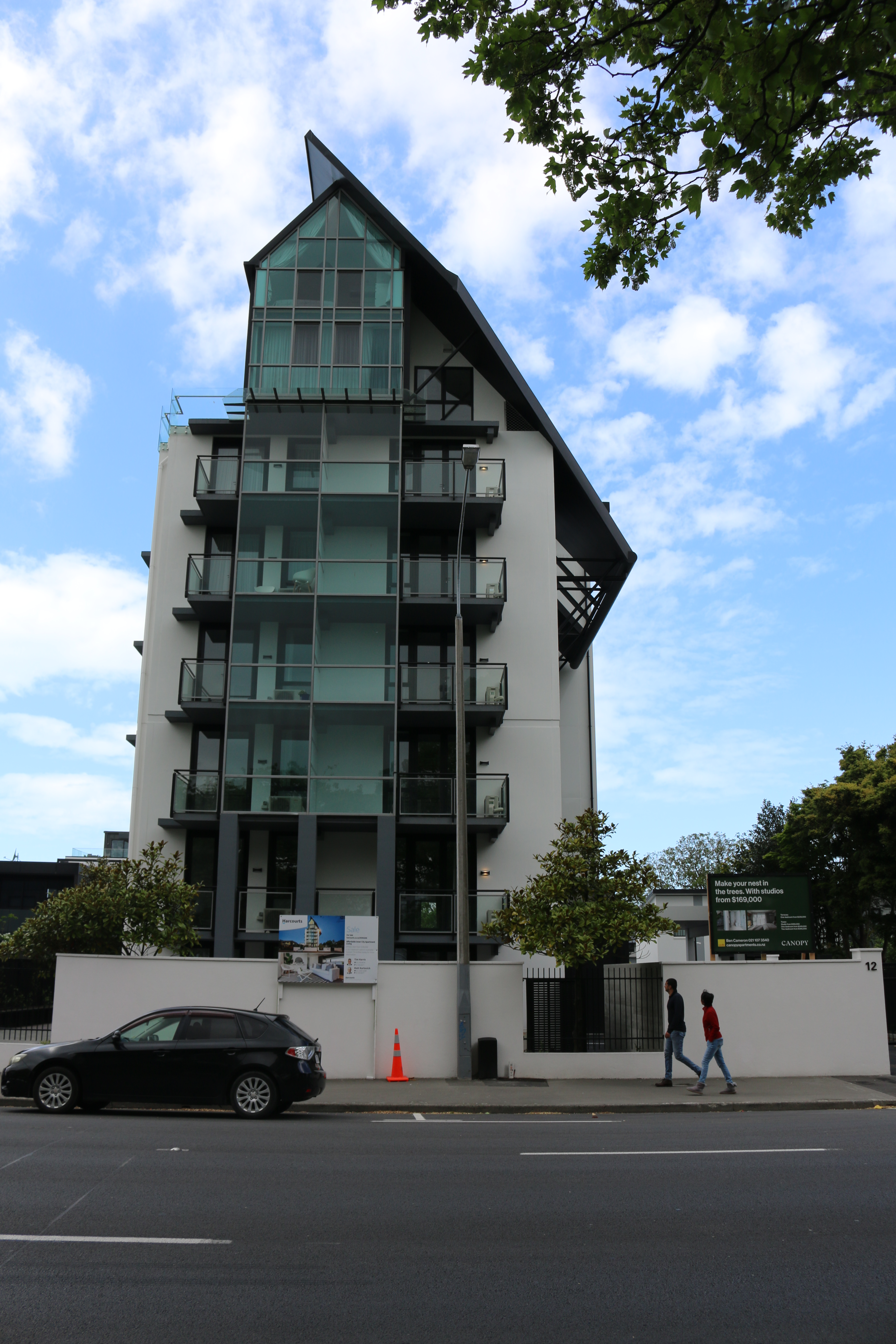
Park Tower, Latimer Square. One of the few remaining tall buildings in Christchurch.

One of Christchurch's few tall apartment buildings, it was on the Christchurch City Council's "Dirty 30" list of buildings holding up the central city rebuild. Repair work is complete in October 2020.

=== Radio Network House ===
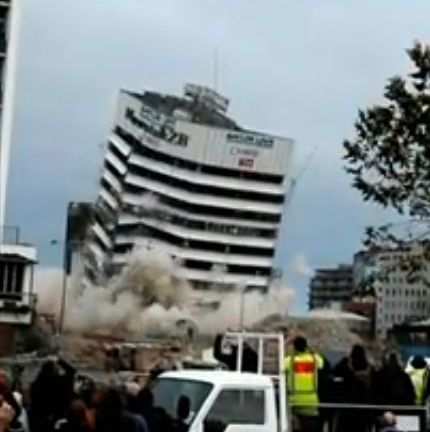
Implosion of Radio Network House, Latimer Square

Radio Network House was imploded after suffering damage in the Canterbury earthquakes. The 14-storey building was demolished by 60 kg of explosives. This was the first ever example of a controlled implosion of a building in New Zealand.

=== Rydges Latimer Hotel ===
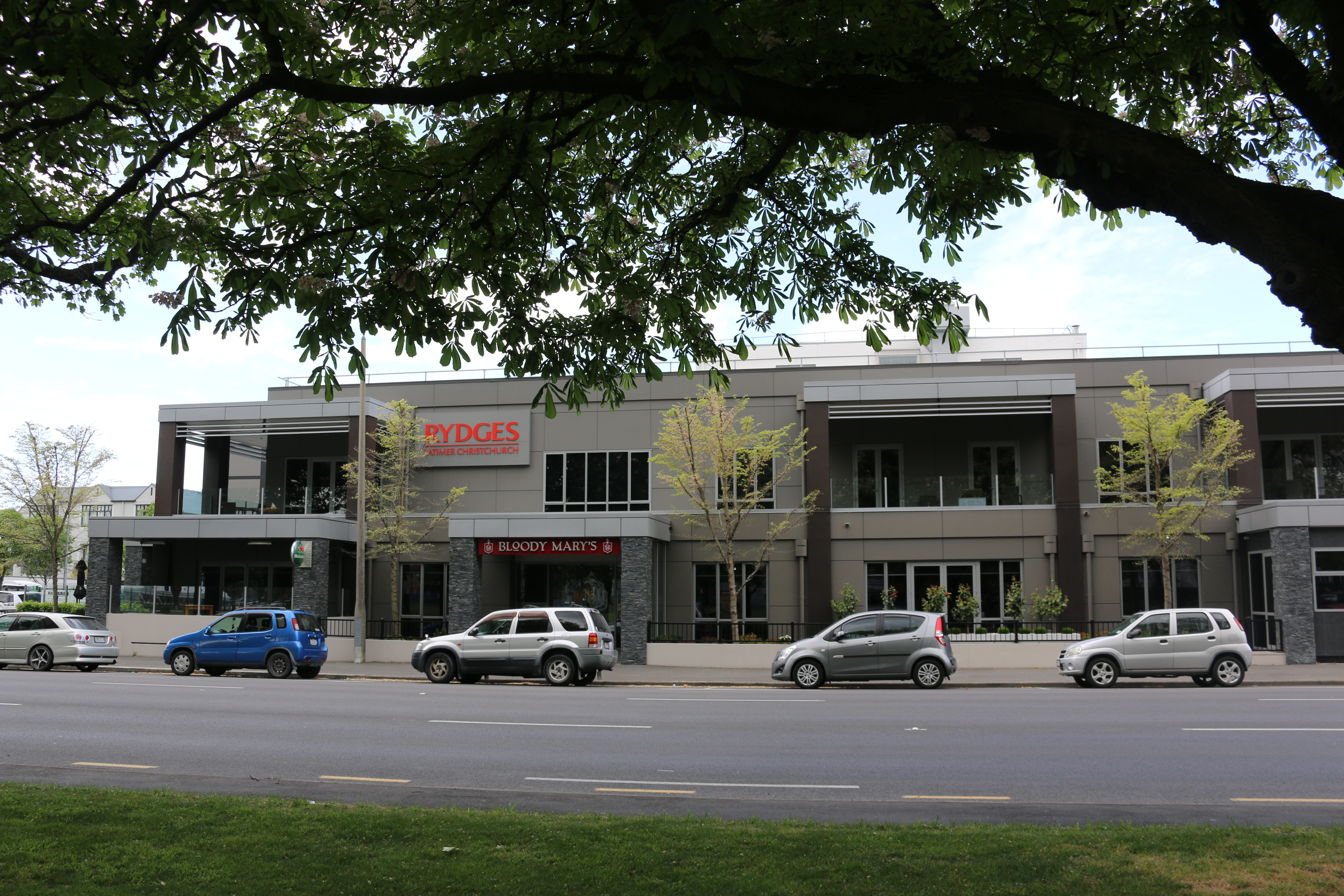
The Rydges Latimer Hotel, Latimer Square with the Bloody Marys restaurant

The Latimer Lodge was one of the first hotels to be redeveloped after the Canterbury earthquakes costing an estimated $25 million. The foundations designed to withstand future earthquakes took about 14 weeks to complete and required about 900 cubic metres of concrete. The Latimer Lodge rebranded as a Rydge's Hotel. It has an estimated 138 rooms.
