= Worcester Street, Christchurch =

Street in Christchurch, New Zealand

Worcester Street
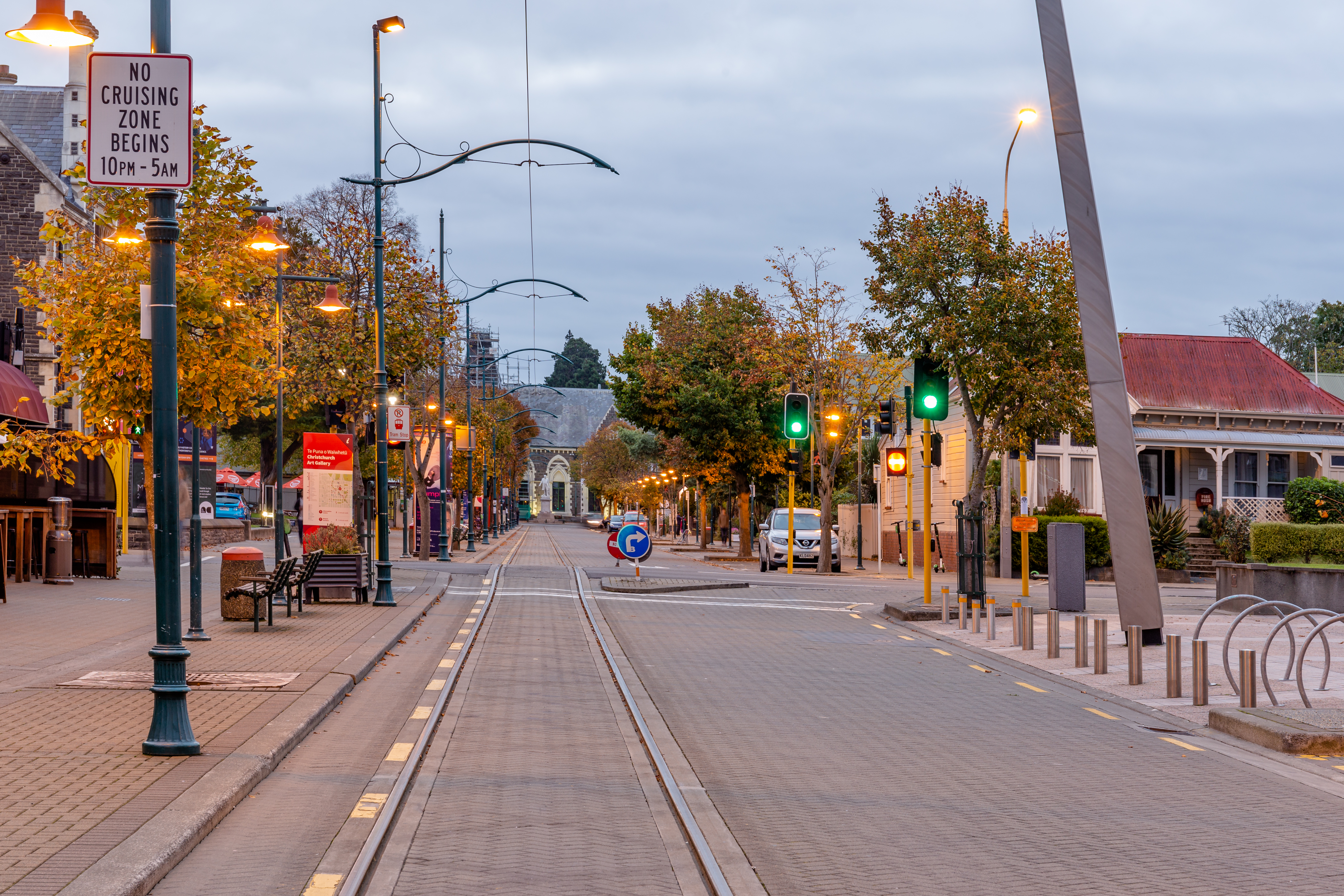
- Worcester Boulevard looking towards the Canterbury Museum, April 2019
- Interactive map of Worcester Street
- Length: 4.3 km (2.7 mi)
- Location: Christchurch, New Zealand
- West end: Rolleston Avenue
- East end: Woodham Road, Linwood

Worcester Street is a road in the central city of Christchurch, New Zealand. It runs from the intersection of Rolleston Avenue in the west, and terminates in the east at the intersection of Woodham Road in Linwood. Between Rolleston Avenue and Cambridge Terrace, it is known as Worcester Boulevard.

== Geography ==
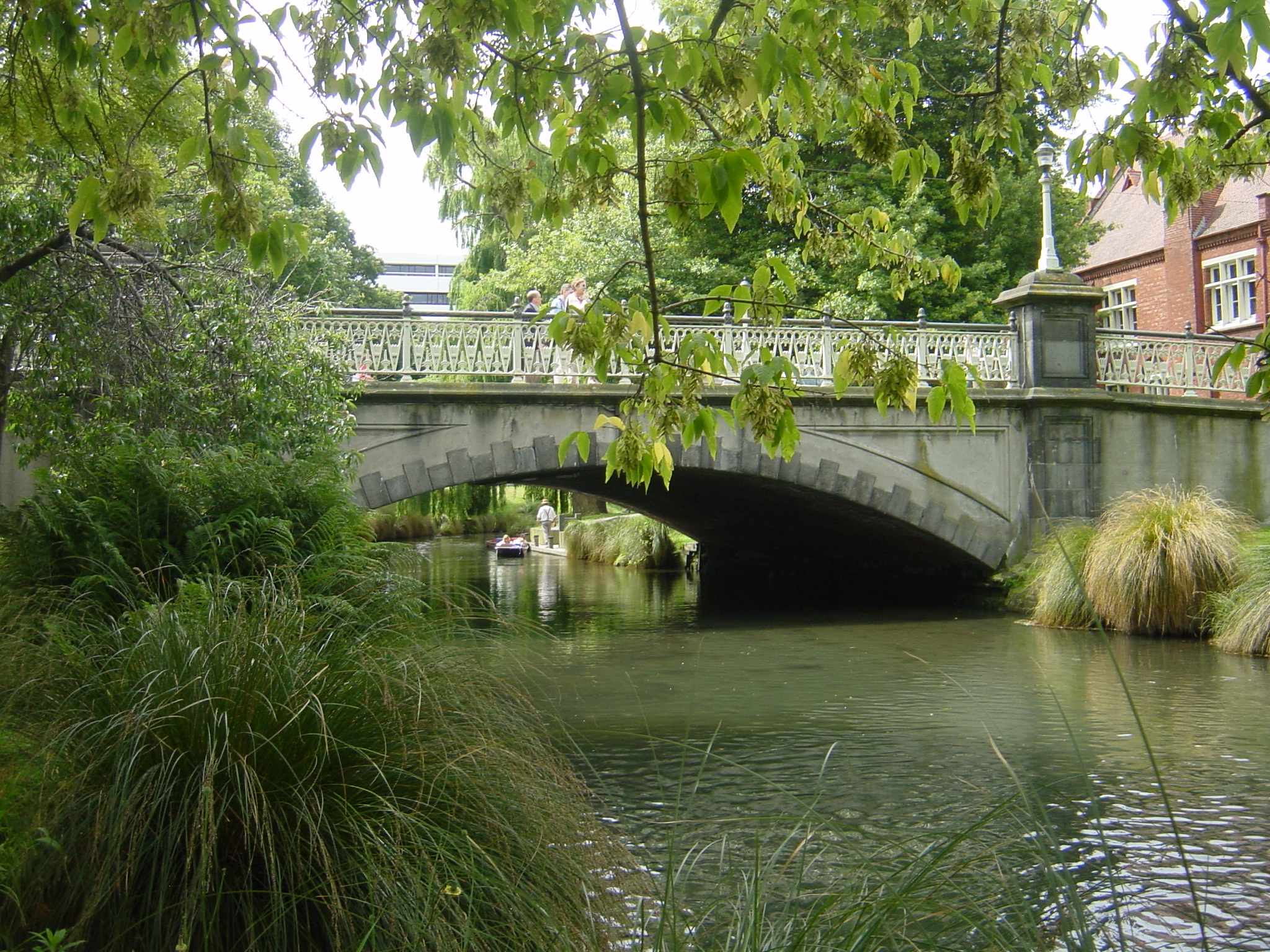
Worcester Street Bridge, looking north. Our City is the red brick building on the extreme right

Worcester St runs for roughly 4.3 kilometres (2.7 mi) from west to east through the centre of Christchurch, and is parallel and one block to the south of Gloucester Street. Between Rolleston Avenue and Cambridge Terrace, it is known as Worcester Boulevard, before crossing over the Avon River (pictured). As the street reaches Cathedral Square it has a slight deviation as it curves around the north side of the ChristChurch Cathedral, before continuing eastward towards Latimer Square. Afterwards, the street continues uninterrupted before ending at the intersection with Woodham Road in residential Linwood.

== History ==
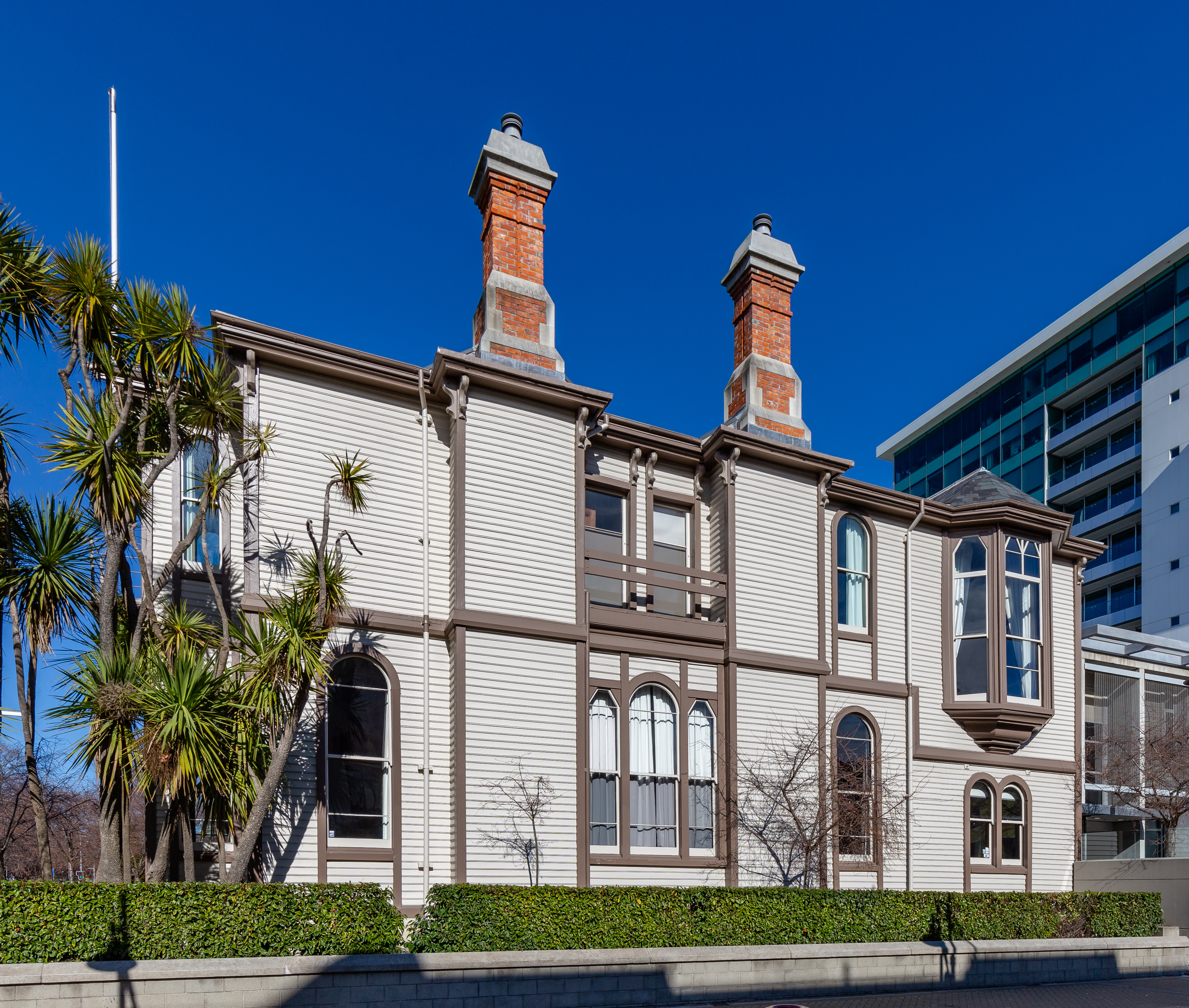
Canterbury Club building, August 2019

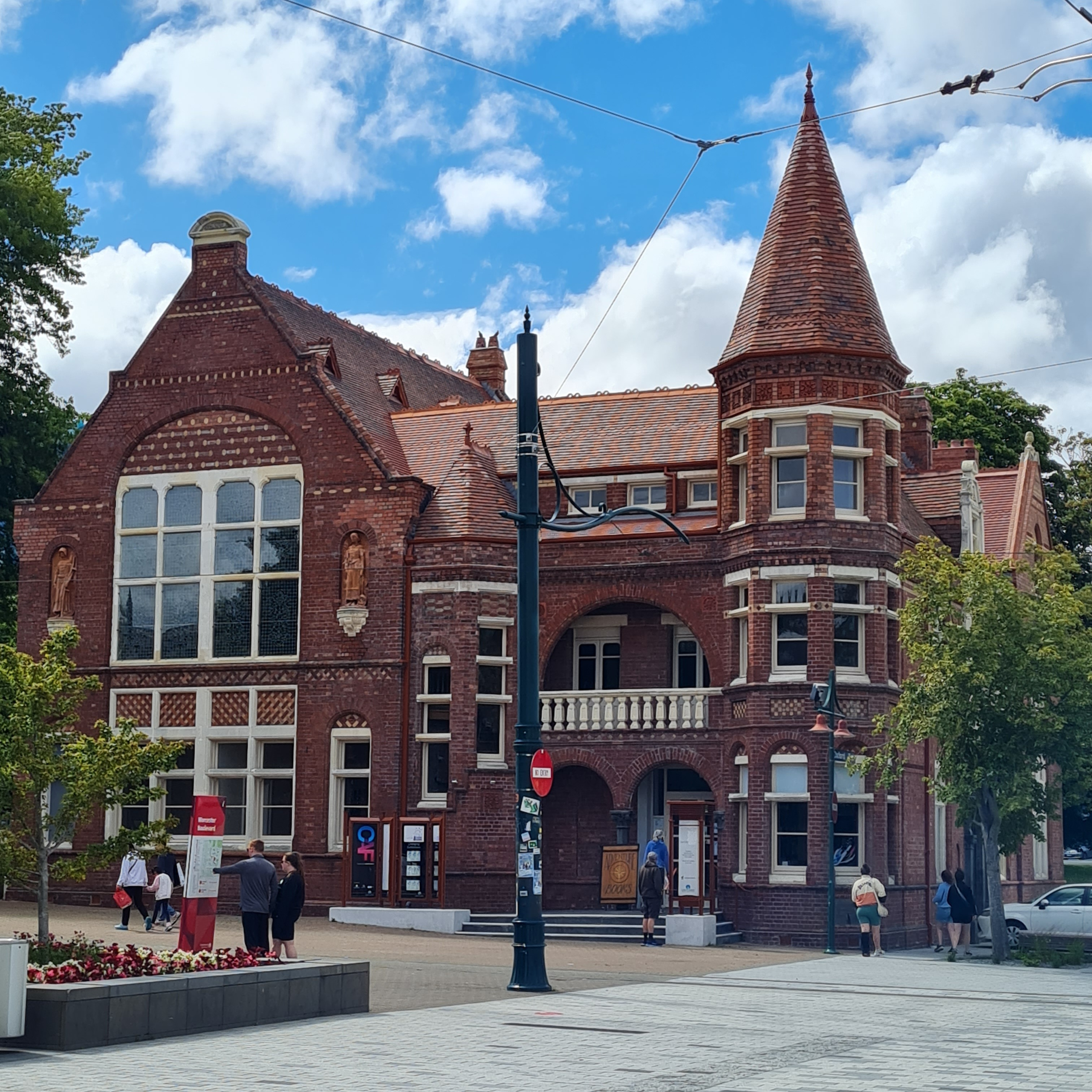
The Christchurch Municipal Chambers, January 2025

In the 1890s, it was still common for cattle and pigs to graze on vegetation (such as gorse) that were growing in fields and footpaths in the area. As such, gorse fires were a recurring event. In 1896, a particularly large gorse fire occurred, having parts of Worcester Street, as well as Gloucester and Armagh Streets well ablaze.

=== Buildings ===
As one of the older streets in Central Christchurch, many historic buildings of regional and national importance are located here. The most notable of which is the Arts Centre. It is of Gothic Revival and was the former Canterbury College (now the University of Canterbury), Christchurch Boys' High School and Christchurch Girls' High School buildings, many of which were designed by Benjamin Mountfort. The centre is a national landmark and taonga as it is home to New Zealand's largest collection of category one heritage buildings with 21 of the 23 buildings covered by Heritage New Zealand listings.

Canterbury Club, (founded in 1872) has its premises on Worcester Boulevard. The building was commissioned and for William Armson to design a building, but he fell ill and in early 1873 the commission was passed to Frederick Strouts instead. The building was strengthened in 2008–09 and this work was the reason that the 2010 and 2011 earthquakes caused only moderate damage. After earthquake repairs had been done, the premises reopened on 8 June 2012.

The Christchurch Municipal Chambers is a Category I heritage building registered with Heritage New Zealand. Construction was started in 1886 and finished in 1887, and is built in the Queen Anne style. It was damaged in the 2010 Canterbury earthquake, with bracing erected around the building. As of August 2022, it still remains off-reach to the public. It is planned to be restored, but costs of restoration exceed the amount insured for the building.

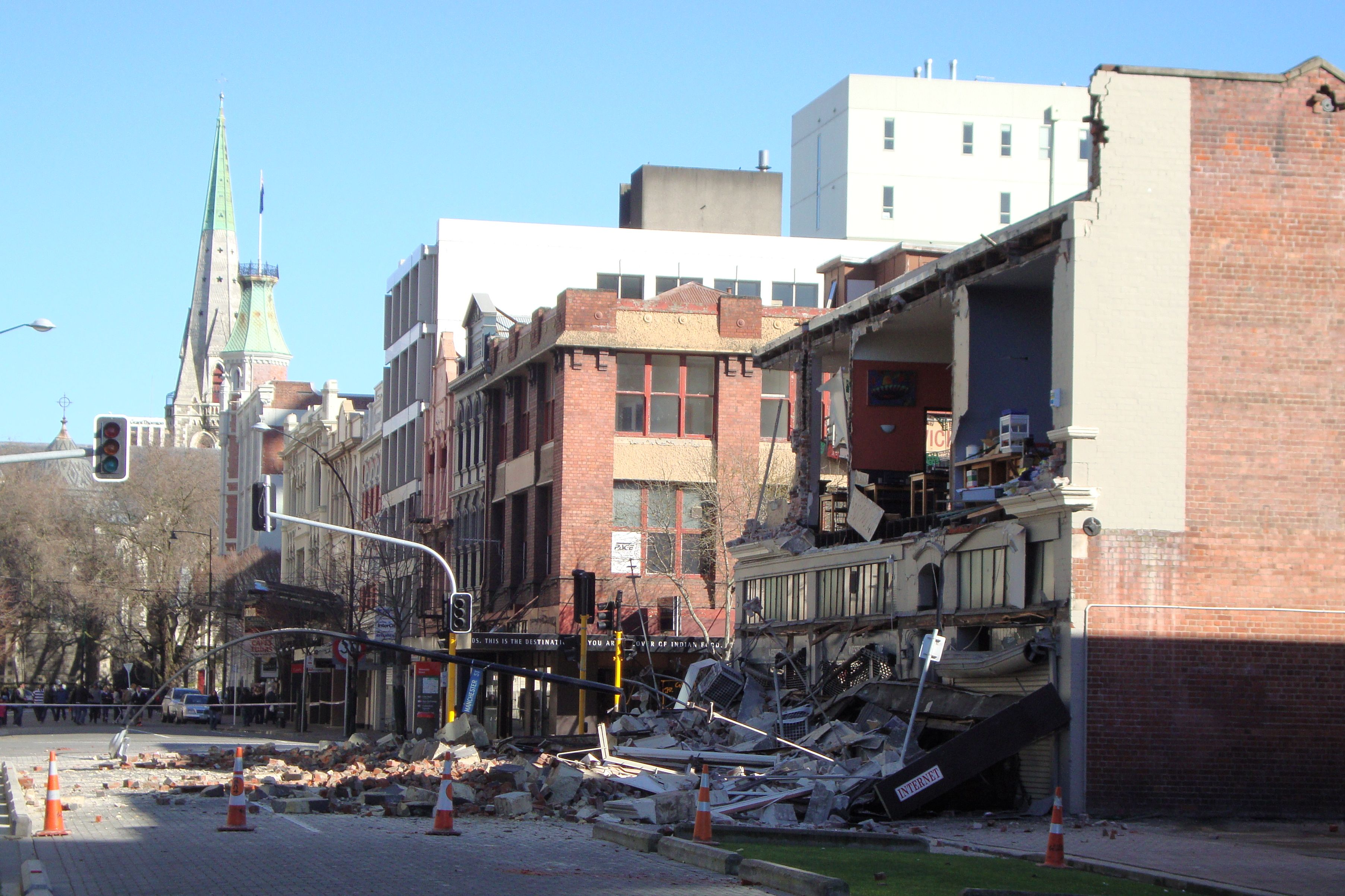
Building damage in Worcester Street, corner Manchester Street, with ChristChurch Cathedral in the background. (September 2010)

The Old Government Building was designed by Joseph Maddison in 1909 and opened in 1913. From there, it housed various Government departments for more than seventy years. It is designed in the style of an Italian High Renaissance palazzo.

=== Redevelopment ===
The section that is now Worcester Boulevard was redeveloped and opened in February 1995. It was redeveloped in three stages, with the addition of planting, repaving, special lighting, restrictions on traffic and the addition of an historic electric tram line, forming part of the heritage Christchurch tramway system.

=== 2010–2011 Canterbury earthquakes ===
Buildings and historic building façades located in Worcester St suffered damage and even collapse in both earthquakes. After the 2011 Christchurch earthquake, much of Worcester Street was included in the Central City Red Zone, an area of a public exclusion zone.

== Gallery ==
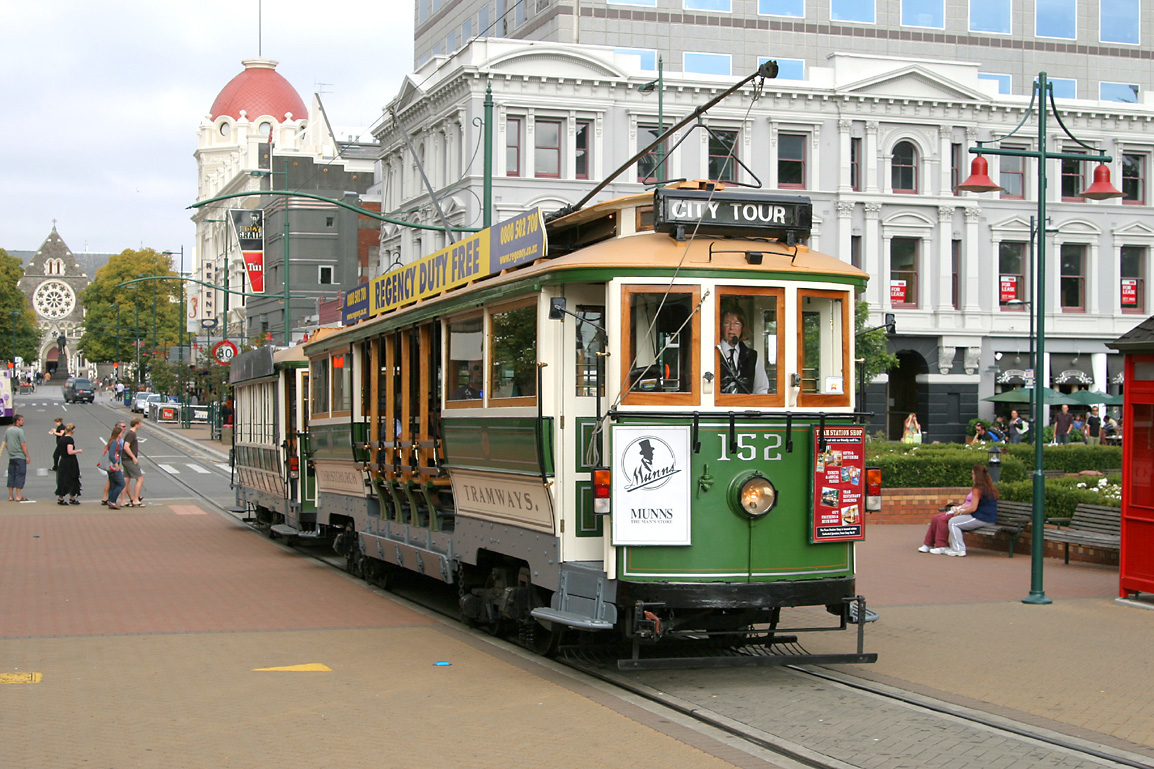
Christchurch trams at the intersection with Oxford Terrace. February 2007

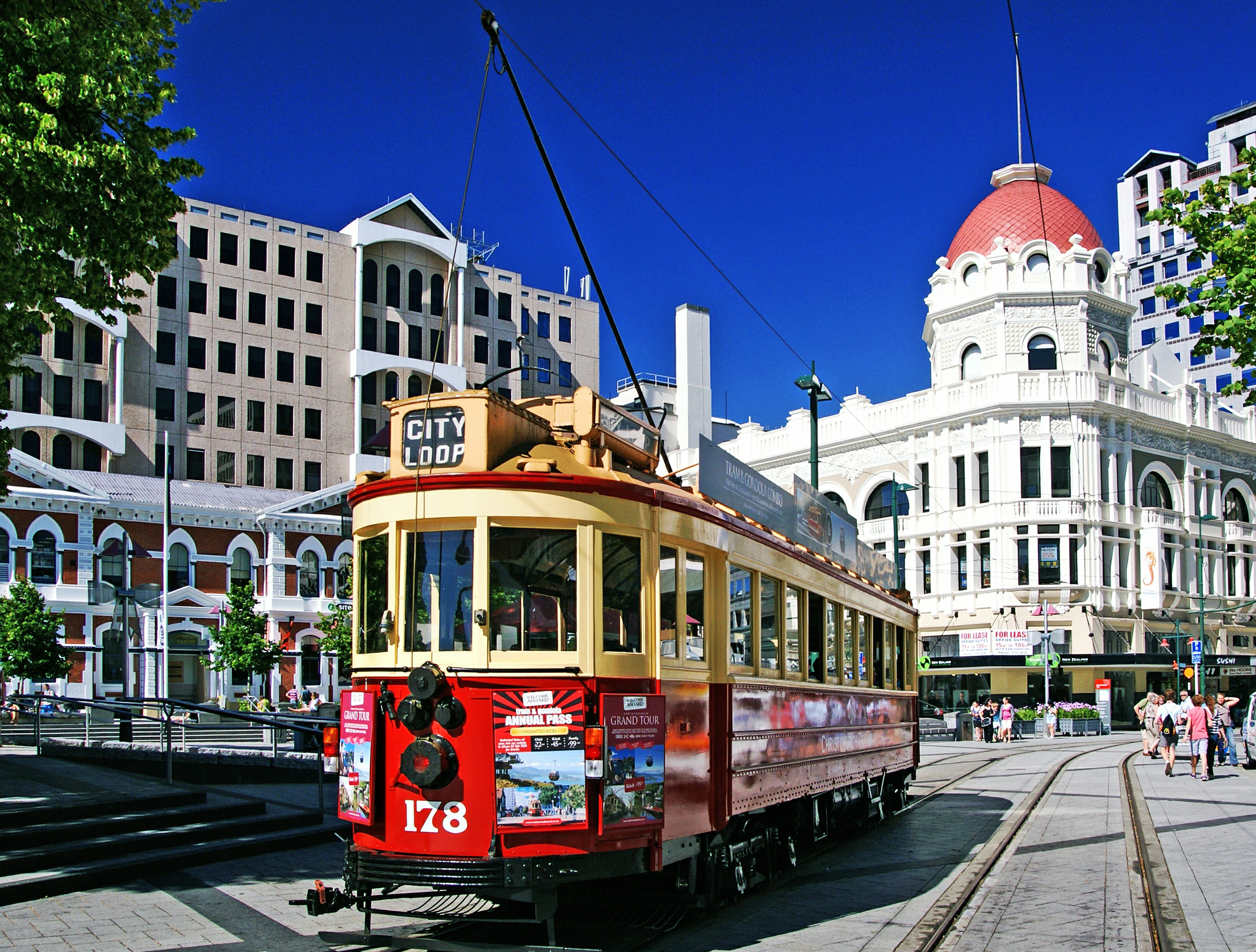
Tram 178 in front of the domed Regent Theatre. January 2010

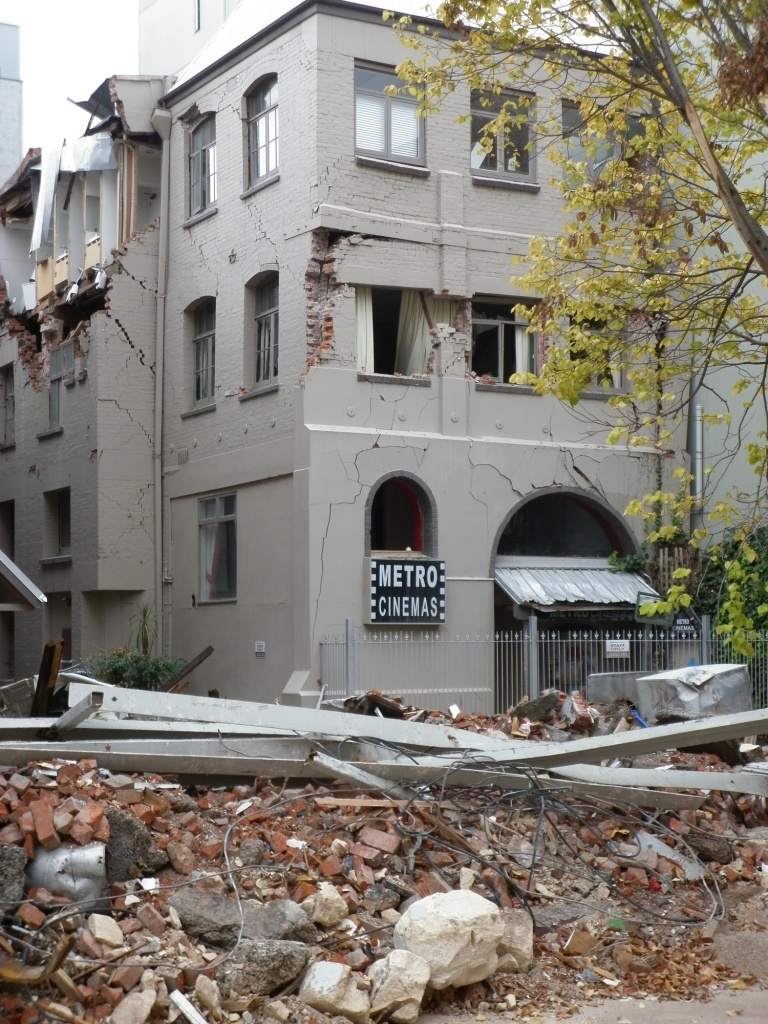
Metro Cinema, structural damage on from the February 2011 earthquake. March 2011

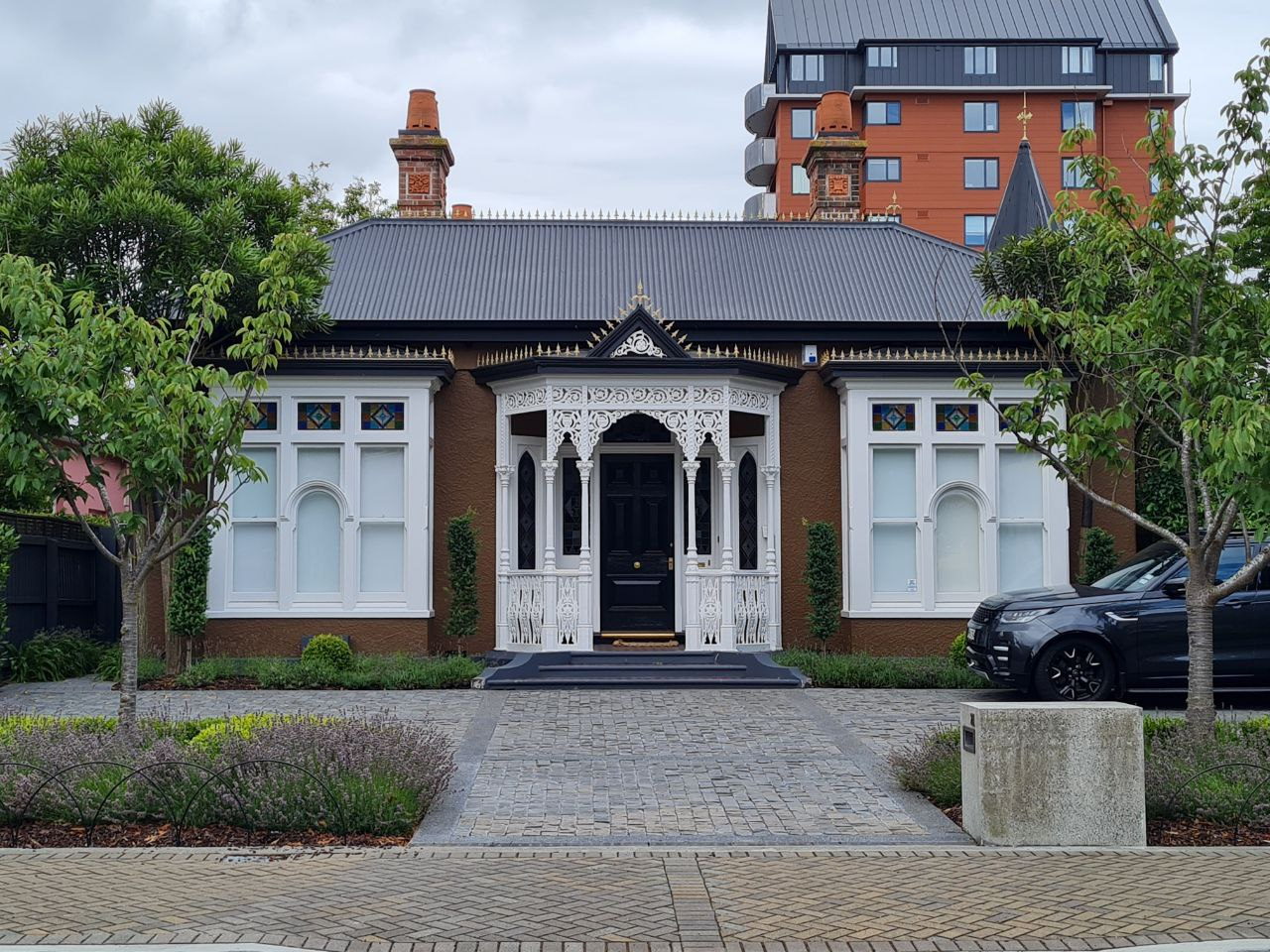
Dyslexia Foundation of New Zealand, Worcester Boulevard. January 2023

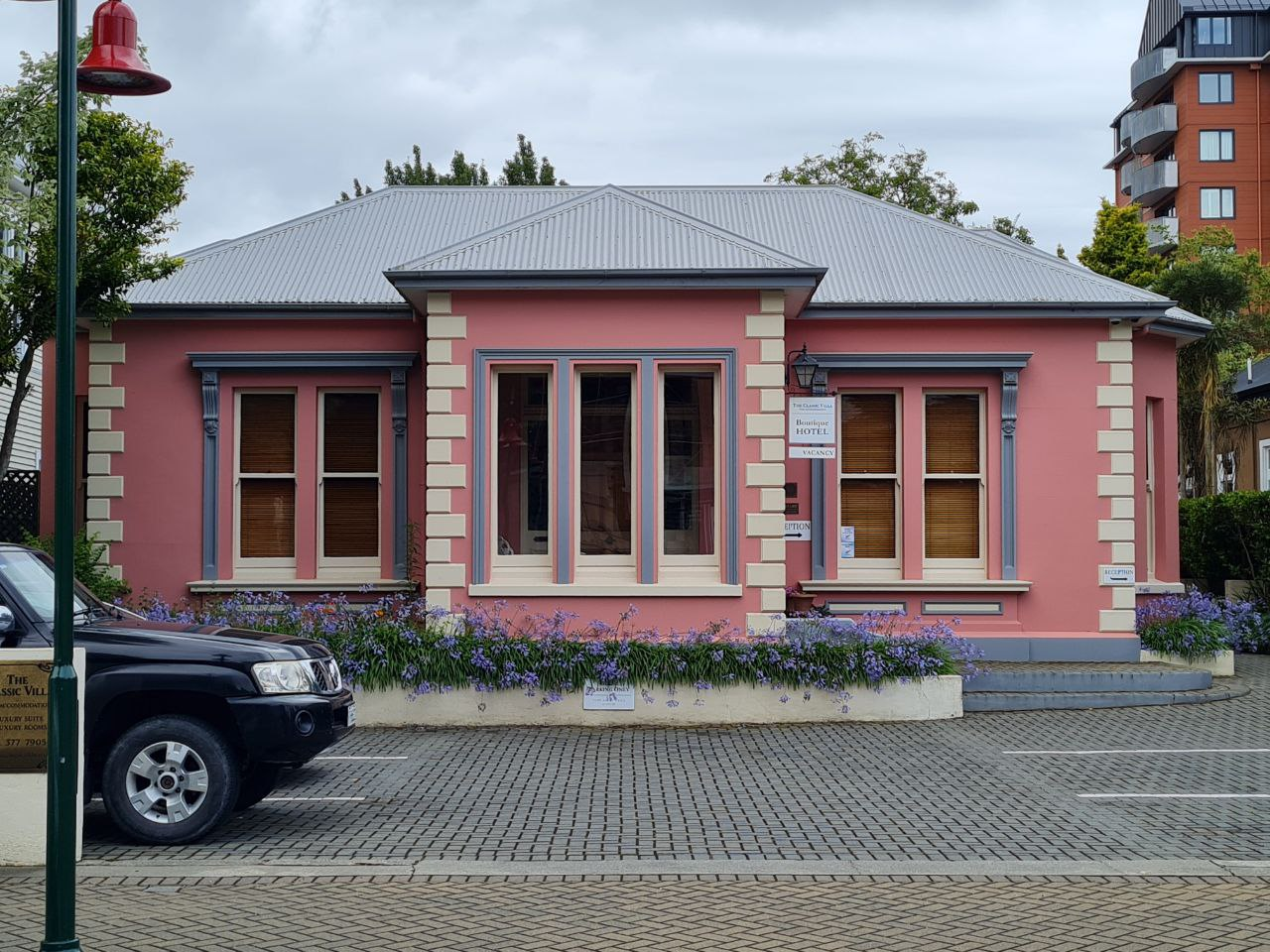
The Classic Villa, a five-star hotel, Worcester Boulevard. January 2023

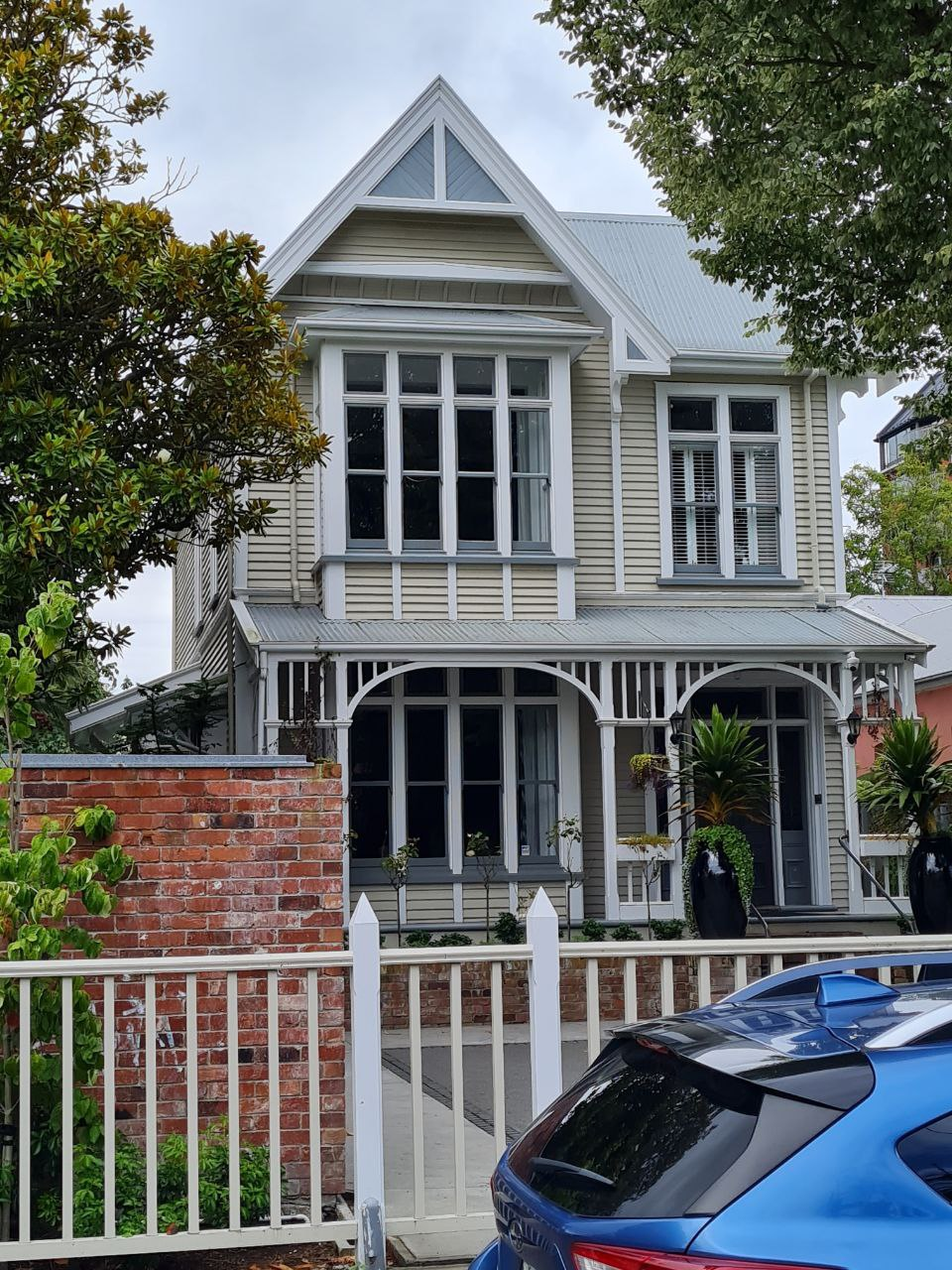
A private-dwelling, 15 Worcester Boulevard. January 2023
