= Gloucester Street =

Major urban street in Christchurch

Coordinates: 43°31′48″S 172°37′40″E

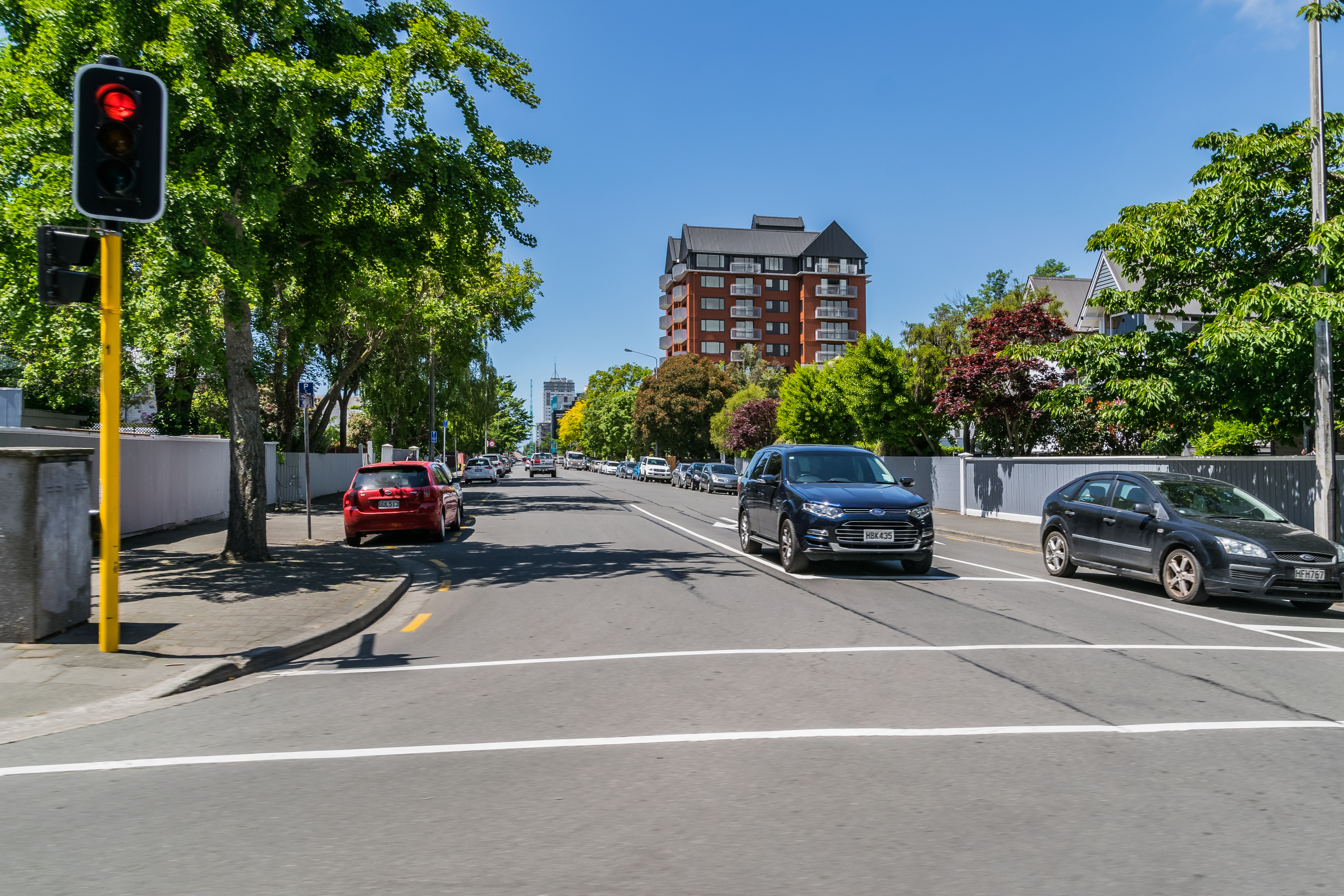
- Gloucester Street, from its western end
- Interactive map of Gloucester Street
- Length: 4.9 km (3.0 mi)
- Location: Christchurch, New Zealand
- West end: Rolleston Avenue
- East end: Avonside Drive, Avonside

Gloucester Street is a major urban street in central Christchurch in the South Island of New Zealand. It runs for approximately 4.9 kilometres (3.0 mi) from a junction with Rolleston Avenue at its western end, directly opposite Christ's College, to the suburbs of Linwood and Avonside in the east. For the majority of its length it runs due west-east, with the section from the central city's eastern edge to Linwood veering to the northeast.

The street lies parallel with and one block to the north of Worcester Street. The street's course is interrupted for one block by the Convention Centre Precinct. As it crosses Linwood Avenue, the street turns northeast and narrows, becoming a suburban arterial road. It then turns north, ending at the Avon River / Ōtākaro. A bridge, Dallington Bridge, crosses the river at this point, and the street continues as Gayhurst Road through a former residential area which was razed as a result of the 2011 Christchurch earthquake.

== Important buildings ==
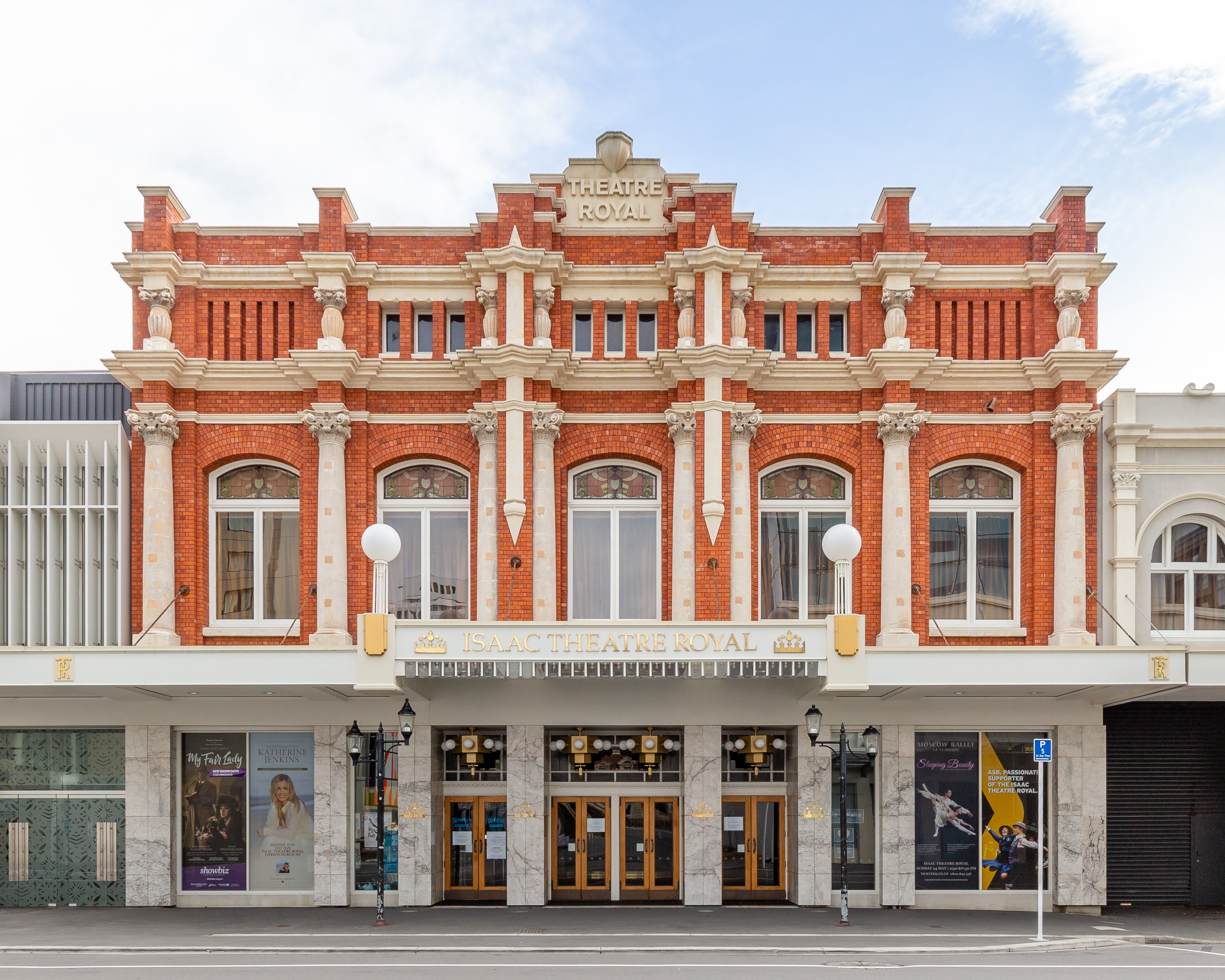
Isaac Theatre Royal, Gloucester Street

Major sites on or adjacent to Gloucester Street include Rolleston House, a NZHPT Category II-listed historic place; Gloucester Street Bridge, a NZHPT Category II-listed historic place; Christchurch Art Gallery, at the corner of Montreal Street, and the neighbouring Centre of Contemporary Art; the Isaac Theatre Royal, a NZHPT Category I-listed historic place; Te Pae Christchurch Convention Centre, between Oxford Terrace and Colombo Street; Latimer Square; and Christchurch East School.

Other notable sites previously along Gloucester Street include the Malings & Co building and DFC House, Luck's Building and the MFL Building, all of which were on the site now occupied by the Convention Centre Precinct, and several buildings demolished or destroyed as a result of the 2011 Christchurch earthquake: Wave House (formerly the Trade Union Building), the former Gas Company Building, the former Canterbury Times and Star Building, the Coachman Inn, and the former Canterbury Television Building, all of which were listed as Category II historic sites by Heritage New Zealand.
