= Edgeware =

Suburb of Christchurch, New Zealand

- Suburb
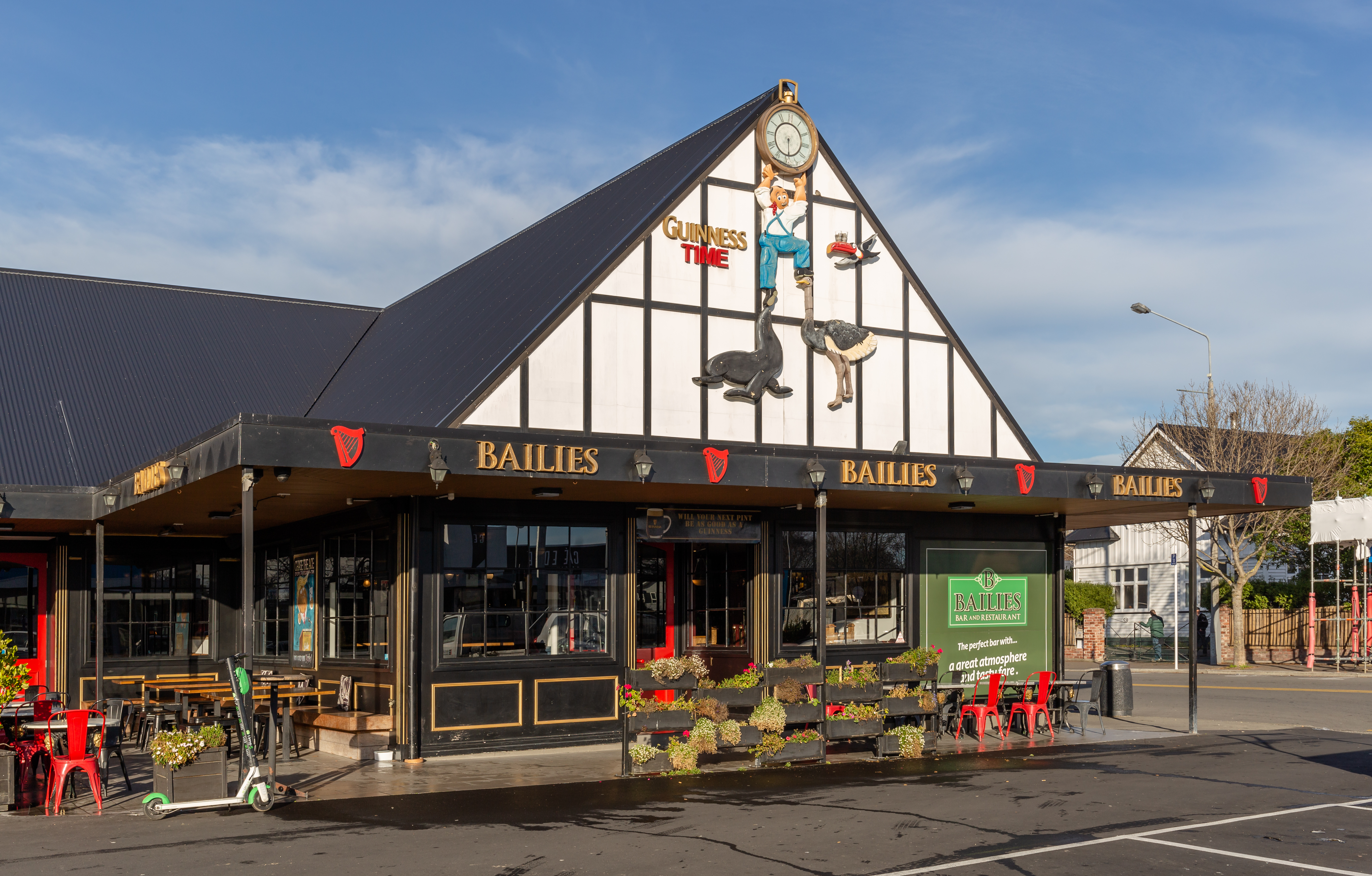
- Bailie's Bar in Edgeware Village
- Interactive map of Edgeware
- Coordinates: 43.514°S 172.647°E
- Country: New Zealand
- City: Christchurch
- Local authority: Christchurch City Council
- Electoral ward: Innes
- Community board: Waipapa Papanui-Innes-Central

Area
  - Land: 101 ha (250 acres)

Population (June 2025)
  - Total: 5,000
  - Density: 5,000/km^{2} (13,000/sq mi)

	Mairehau	Shirley
St Albans	Edgeware	Richmond
	Christchurch Central City

Edgeware is a suburb of Christchurch, New Zealand, to the north of the central city. It is centred on a cluster of some 20 shops that make up Edgeware Village on Edgeware Road near Colombo Street's northern end.

Edgeware received national attention in the news in June 2006, when an out-of-control party on Edgeware Road resulted in the deaths of two schoolgirls.

== Demographics ==
Edgeware covers 1.01 km^{2} (0.39 sq mi). It had an estimated population of 5,000 as of June 2025, with a population density of 4,950 people per km^{2}.

Historical population
Year	Pop.	±% p.a.
2006	3,684	—
2013	3,954	+1.02%
2018	4,125	+0.85%
2023	4,404	+1.32%

Edgeware had a population of 4,404 in the 2023 New Zealand census, an increase of 279 people (6.8%) since the 2018 census, and an increase of 450 people (11.4%) since the 2013 census. There were 2,118 males, 2,250 females, and 36 people of other genders in 2,085 dwellings. 7.8% of people identified as LGBTIQ+. The median age was 31.9 years (compared with 38.1 years nationally). There were 492 people (11.2%) aged under 15 years, 1,434 (32.6%) aged 15 to 29, 2,055 (46.7%) aged 30 to 64, and 420 (9.5%) aged 65 or older.

People could identify as more than one ethnicity. The results were 70.4% European (Pākehā); 10.2% Māori; 3.3% Pasifika; 22.9% Asian; 2.9% Middle Eastern, Latin American and African New Zealanders (MELAA); and 1.9% other, which includes people giving their ethnicity as "New Zealander". English was spoken by 94.5%, Māori by 2.5%, Samoan by 0.7%, and other languages by 20.0%. No language could be spoken by 2.9% (e.g. too young to talk). New Zealand Sign Language was known by 0.5%. The percentage of people born overseas was 35.9, compared with 28.8% nationally.

Religious affiliations were 25.7% Christian, 5.2% Hindu, 1.8% Islam, 0.5% Māori religious beliefs, 1.4% Buddhist, 0.8% New Age, 0.1% Jewish, and 4.2% other religions. People who answered that they had no religion were 54.3%, and 6.3% of people did not answer the census question.

Of those at least 15 years old, 1,353 (34.6%) people had a bachelor's or higher degree, 1,797 (45.9%) had a post-high school certificate or diploma, and 765 (19.6%) people exclusively held high school qualifications. The median income was $46,900, compared with $41,500 nationally. 288 people (7.4%) earned over $100,000 compared to 12.1% nationally. The employment status of those at least 15 was 2,430 (62.1%) full-time, 441 (11.3%) part-time, and 96 (2.5%) unemployed.

Individual statistical areas
Name	Area (km^{2})	Population	Density (per km^{2})	Dwellings	Median age	Median income
Edgeware North	0.43	1,374	3,195	654	33.8 years	$46,500
Edgeware South	0.58	3,030	5,224	1,431	31.4 years	$47,100
New Zealand					38.1 years	$41,500
