= Richmond, Christchurch =

Suburb of Christchurch, New Zealand

Richmond
- Suburb
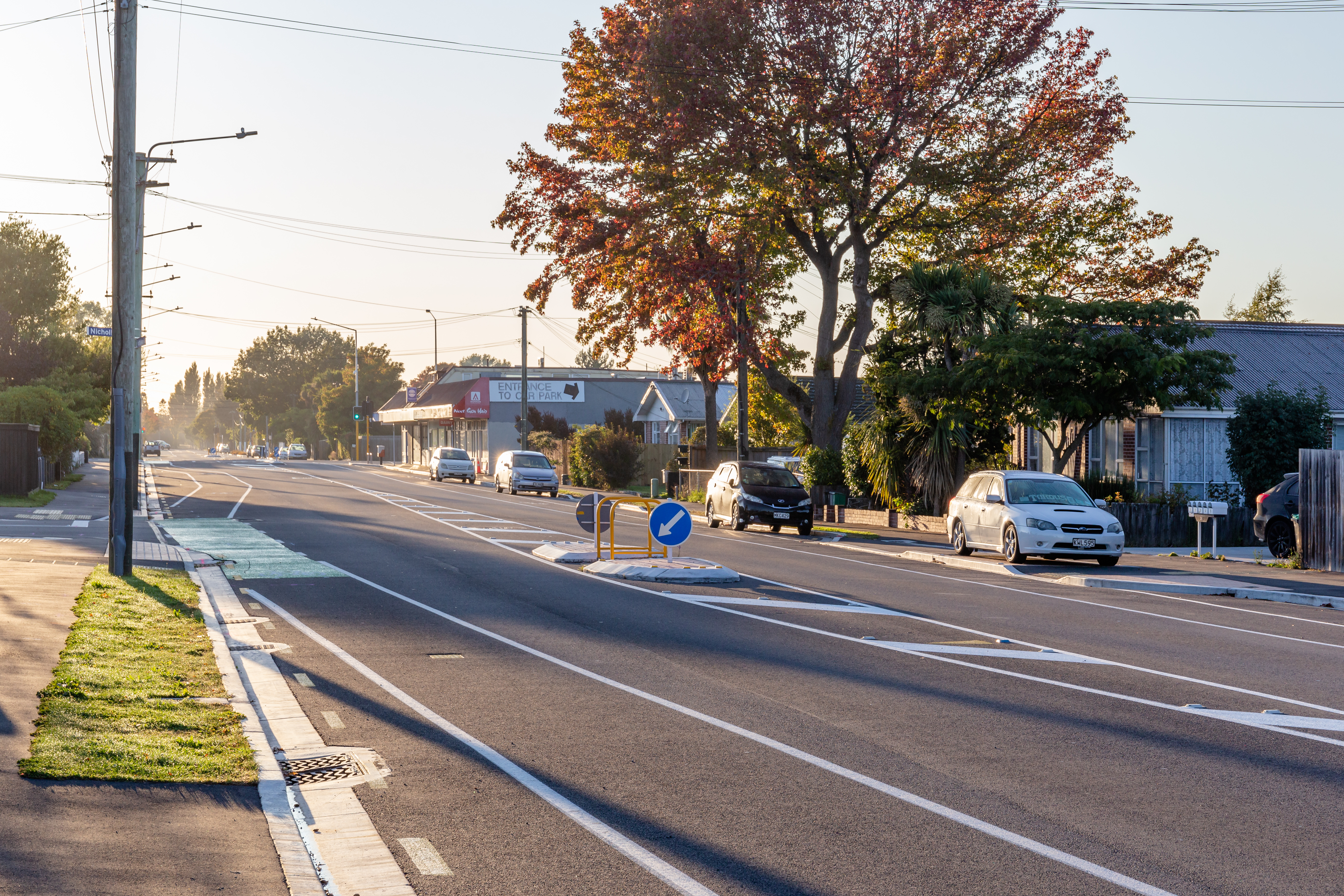
- North Avon Road
- Interactive map of Richmond
- Coordinates: 43.516767°S 172.651684°E
- Country: New Zealand
- City: Christchurch
- Local authority: Christchurch City Council
- Electoral ward: Central
- Community board: Waipapa Papanui-Innes-Central

Area
  - Land: 197 ha (490 acres)

Population (June 2025)
  - Total: 5,210
  - Density: 2,640/km^{2} (6,850/sq mi)

Mairehau	Shirley	Dallington
Edgeware	Richmond	(Residential red zone)
Christchurch Central City	Linwood	Avonside

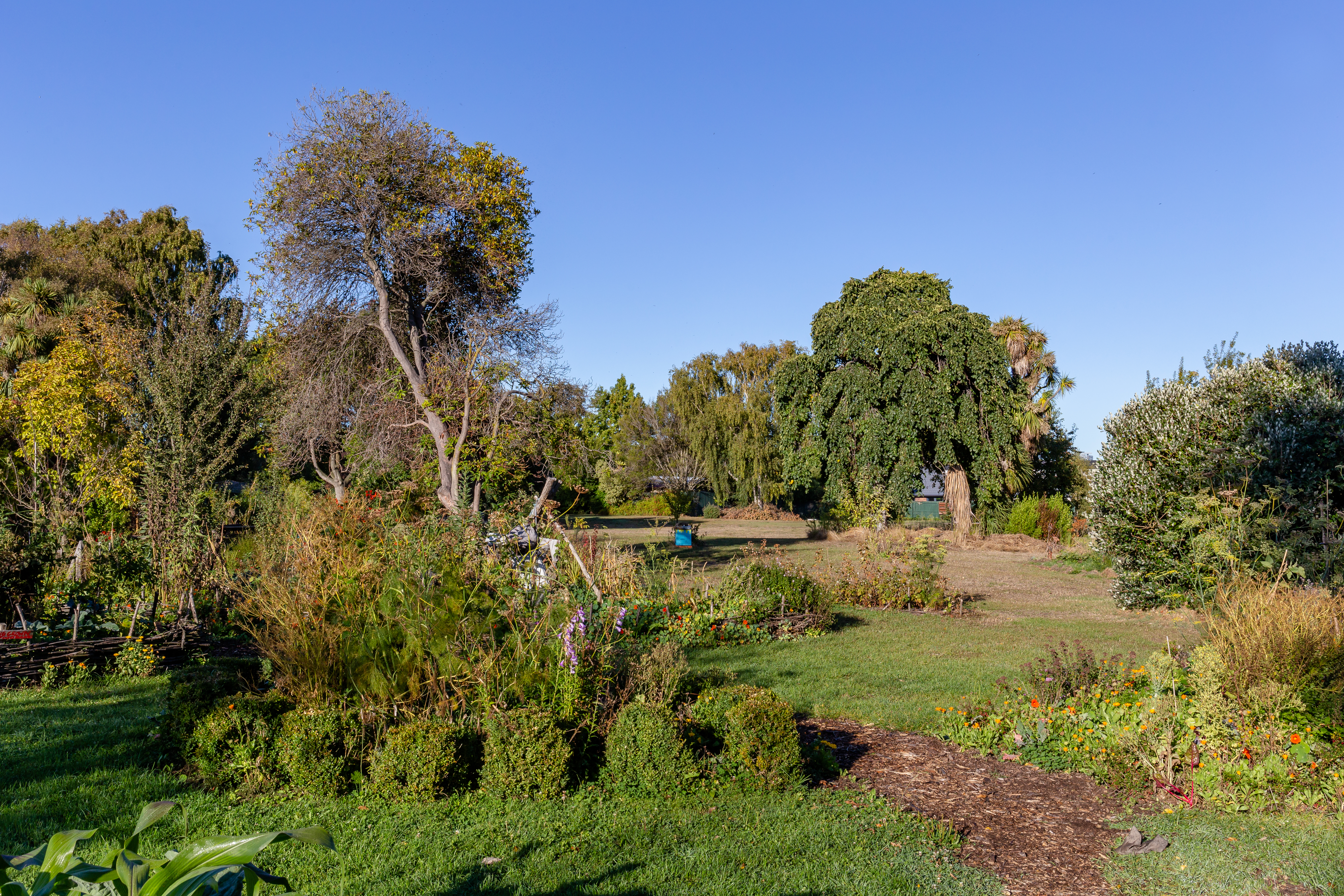
Richmond Community Garden

Richmond is a suburb of Christchurch, New Zealand.

Situated to the inner north east of the city centre, the suburb is bounded by Shirley Road to the north, Hills Road to the west, and the Avon River to the south and east.

In 2018, ongoing earthquake repairs and flood mitigation work were causing disruption within Richmond.

== Demographics ==
Richmond covers 1.97 km^{2} (0.76 sq mi). It had an estimated population of 5,210 as of June 2025, with a population density of 2,645 people per km^{2}.

Historical population
Year	Pop.	±% p.a.
2006	5,406	—
2013	4,311	−3.18%
2018	4,305	−0.03%
2023	4,779	+2.11%

Richmond had a population of 4,779 in the 2023 New Zealand census, an increase of 474 people (11.0%) since the 2018 census, and an increase of 468 people (10.9%) since the 2013 census. There were 2,346 males, 2,400 females, and 33 people of other genders in 2,163 dwellings. 7.4% of people identified as LGBTIQ+. The median age was 34.1 years (compared with 38.1 years nationally). There were 672 people (14.1%) aged under 15 years, 1,185 (24.8%) aged 15 to 29, 2,364 (49.5%) aged 30 to 64, and 558 (11.7%) aged 65 or older.

People could identify as more than one ethnicity. The results were 74.4% European (Pākehā); 13.6% Māori; 4.8% Pasifika; 17.1% Asian; 2.4% Middle Eastern, Latin American and African New Zealanders (MELAA); and 2.1% other, which includes people giving their ethnicity as "New Zealander". English was spoken by 95.3%, Māori by 3.3%, Samoan by 1.2%, and other languages by 17.0%. No language could be spoken by 2.8% (e.g. too young to talk). New Zealand Sign Language was known by 1.0%. The percentage of people born overseas was 28.4, compared with 28.8% nationally.

Religious affiliations were 26.2% Christian, 3.6% Hindu, 1.9% Islam, 0.6% Māori religious beliefs, 1.1% Buddhist, 1.0% New Age, 0.1% Jewish, and 3.2% other religions. People who answered that they had no religion were 55.9%, and 6.7% of people did not answer the census question.

Of those at least 15 years old, 1,176 (28.6%) people had a bachelor's or higher degree, 1,962 (47.8%) had a post-high school certificate or diploma, and 966 (23.5%) people exclusively held high school qualifications. The median income was $40,600, compared with $41,500 nationally. 303 people (7.4%) earned over $100,000 compared to 12.1% nationally. The employment status of those at least 15 was 2,163 (52.7%) full-time, 549 (13.4%) part-time, and 132 (3.2%) unemployed.

Individual statistical areas
Name	Area (km^{2})	Population	Density (per km^{2})	Dwellings	Median age	Median income
Richmond North	1.17	2,409	2,059	957	35.2 years	$43,100
Richmond South	0.80	2,367	2,959	1,206	33.4 years	$38,700
New Zealand					38.1 years	$41,500

== History ==
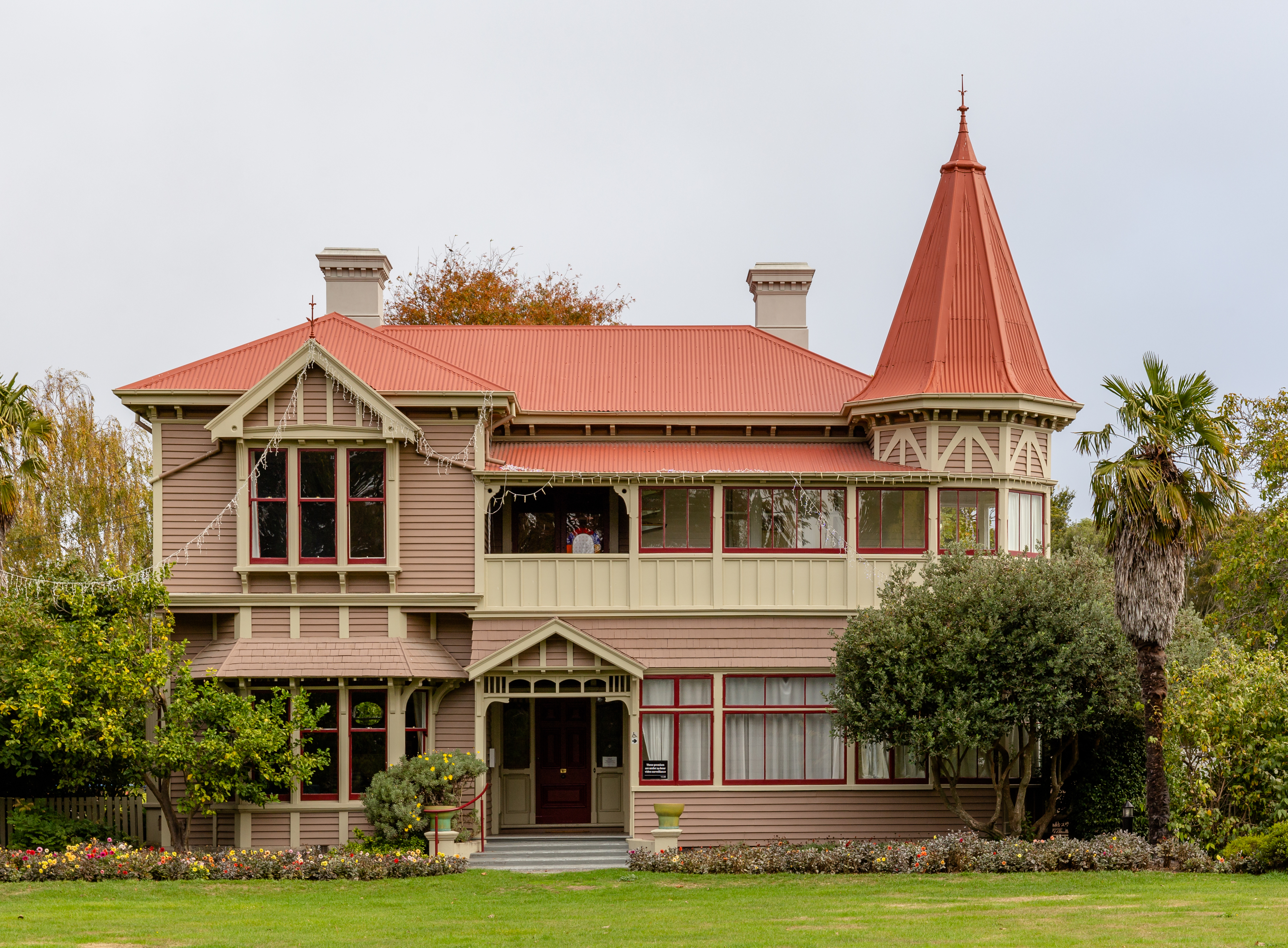
Avebury House, Christchurch

In the early days after Christchurch was established, there was a plan to create a system of canals to facilitate transport into Christchurch from outlying reaches, such as the foot of the Bridle Path, the then main route into Christchurch from the port. Buildings on the Richmond site were first erected in the 1850s, in anticipation of a planned canal linking other planned canals in Linwood and Shirley. The plan for canals was dropped in 1867 after the Lyttelton tunnel was opened. The initial name of the area was Bingsland, after a person named Bing, who had a long lease on church land there. It was later changed to Richmond, named after Richmond Hill in London.

Avebury House is a large two-storeyed building built in 1885 with extensions added in 1907. It is just north of the Avon river and is surrounded by garden-like grounds open to the public. In the early 1970s it was converted for use as a youth hostel. In the late 1990s it survived the threat of demolition to become a community facility.

== Education ==
Jean Seabrook Memorial School was a private coeducational primary school for years 1 to 8. It applied for special-character status in 2020, but the application was declined by the Ministry of Education and the school went into an "indefinite recess" due to lack of funding.

In 2022, Banks Avenue School moved sites from Banks Avenue in Dallington to Averill Street in Richmond and was renamed Pareawa Banks Avenue School.
