= List of historic places in Christchurch =

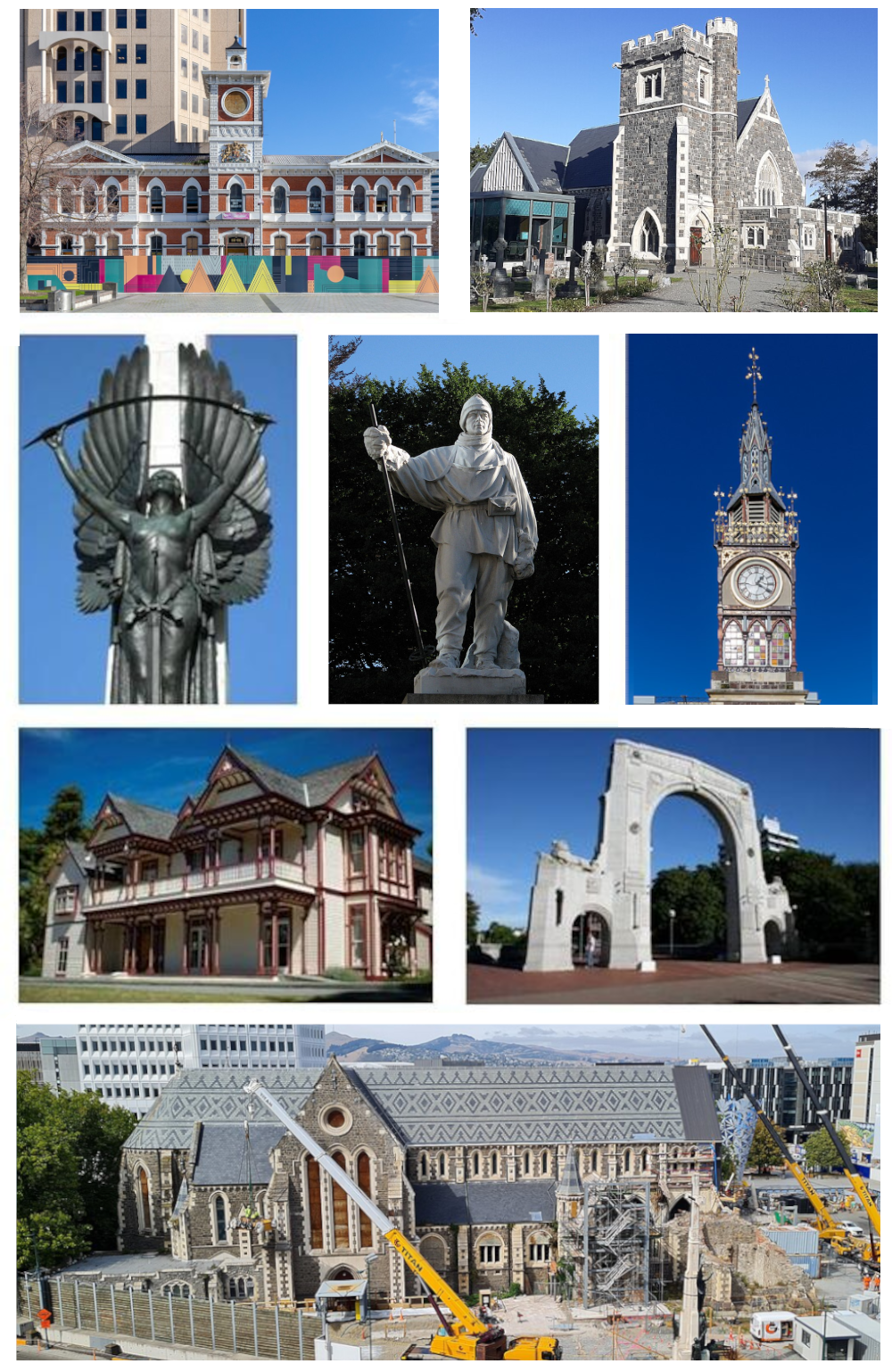
Montage of Christchurch heritage structures (from top left): Chief Post Office, St Peter's Church, Citizens' War Memorial, Statue of Robert Falcon Scott, Victoria Clock Tower, Riccarton House, Bridge of Remembrance and Christ Church Cathedral

This list of Heritage New Zealand-listed places in Christchurch contains those buildings and structures that are listed, or were listed in early 2011, with Heritage New Zealand (formerly known as Historic Places Trust) in Christchurch, New Zealand. The list is confined to the boundaries of Christchurch prior to amalgamation with the Banks Peninsula District in March 2006.

== Heritage New Zealand-listed places in Christchurch ==
There are two registers of heritage places in Christchurch. One is the national register administered by Heritage New Zealand and the other is the register in the Christchurch City Plan. The scope of this article is the Heritage New Zealand register only.

There are four parts to the national register; historic places, historic areas, Wāhi Tapu (places sacred to Māori) and Wāhi Tapu areas. Christchurch has listings in the former two categories. As of July 2011, there were 315 historic places and seven historic areas listed. In August 2011, Heritage New Zealand started the process of removing listings of buildings demolished after the earthquakes, starting with the Manchester Courts and the NZ Trust and Loan Building entries.

=== Heritage loss ===
Some of the listed buildings suffered damage to varying degrees in the 4 September 2010 Canterbury earthquake. Manchester Courts in the central city was the only listed building that was demolished after that earthquake.

Many more heritage listed buildings were lost following the February 2011 Christchurch earthquake, due to action by Civil Defence after the earthquake, and the Canterbury Earthquake Recovery Authority's clearance and redevelopment plans. Some heritage buildings fully collapsed during the earthquake, for example the Durham Street Methodist Church (killing three workers), the Stone Chamber of the Canterbury Provincial Council Buildings, the Oxford Terrace Baptist Church and the Sevicke Jones Building in Cathedral Square. Other listed buildings partially collapsed, or were badly damaged, including ChristChurch Cathedral, the Cathedral of the Blessed Sacrament, and Holy Trinity Avonside.

Category I buildings in central Christchurch demolished since the earthquakes include the Cranmer Centre (the former site of the Christchurch Girls' High School), the Guthrey Centre in City Mall, The Press Building, and the Excelsior Hotel building and façade in 2011 and 2016, respectively. Odean Theatre still awaits restoration, following the decision to sell it by its owners, Environment Canterbury, in June 2025.

Category II buildings in central Christchurch that have been demolished include Clarendon Tower and its façade, St Elmo Courts, and Wharetiki House.

=== Heritage restoration ===
Three listed heritage statues fell off their plinths; Scott Statue, Godley Statue (restored in 2016) and Rolleston Statue (restored in 2016), with the latter receiving significant damage (the head broke off).

Category I heritage listings that have received significant damage, but where the owners have declared that they will be repaired, include the Christchurch Arts Centre The future of a number of heritage buildings is as yet undecided. In 2013, the Registry Building of the Arts Centre reopened after a complete renovation and strengthening. In 2014, the Isaac Theatre Royal reopened after a $40m restoration. During 2016, the Mona Vale homestead was reopened. In 2017 the Edmonds Band Rotunda and Sign of the Kiwi reopened. The Sign of the Takahe reopened in 2019. It is expected that the gatehouse of Mona Vale, Old Stone House, the former Trinity Church, and Shand's Emporium will reopen.

== List of historic places ==
Category	Name	Address	Notes	Photo	Date of construction
II	Antonio Hall	265 Riccarton Road, Riccarton	Built 1904–1909 as a private home, originally named Kilmead. Damaged during the 2011 Christchurch earthquake, but not repaired. Multiple arson attacks; demolished in 2026 to be replaced by student housing.		1904–1909
II	Cashmere Hills Presbyterian Church	2 MacMillan Avenue, Cashmere			1929
I	Christ Church Cathedral	100 Cathedral Square	Anglican Cathedral. Seriously damaged occurred during the February 2011 earthquake, including the collapse of the spire.		1864–1904
I	Church of St Michael and All Angels, Christchurch	90 Oxford Terrace			1870–1872
II	Knox Church	Bealey Avenue	Damaged during the February 2011 earthquake. Repaired.		1901–1902
I	Nurses' Memorial Chapel	2 Riccarton Avenue	Damaged by the 2010 Canterbury earthquake and subsequent earthquakes. Restoration was completed in 2018.		1927
II	Rose Historic Chapel	866 Colombo Street	Built 1910. Suffered serious damage in the February 2011 earthquake. Restoration work was completed in 2018.		1910
I	St Andrew's Church, Christchurch	16 Merivale Lane, Merivale	Presbyterian Church in the grounds of Rangi Ruru Girls' School.		1856–1857
II	St Augustine's Church, Christchurch	5 Cracroft Terrace, Cashmere	Anglican church built 1908.		1908
I	St Barnabas Church, Christchurch	145 Fendalton Road, Fendalton	Damaged by the February 2011 earthquake. Restoration completed in 2017.		1925–1926
I	St John of God Chapel	12 Nash Road, Halswell			1910–1912
II	St Lukes Chapel (Christchurch City Mission)	275 Hereford Street			1888
I	St Luke's Vicarage	185 Kilmore Street	Built 1867–68. Believed to be the oldest Anglican vicarage in New Zealand in continuous use.		1867–1868
II	St Mary's Church	24 Church Lane, Merivale	Anglican church built 1926. Demolished following the February 2011 earthquake and later replaced.		1926
II	St Mary's Church	329 Halswell Road, Halswell	Anglican church built 1871. Underwent significant restoration following a fire in 1967.		1871
II	St Michael and All Angels Stone School Building	249 Durham Street			n.d.
I	St Michael and All Angels Belfry	86 Oxford Terrace	Built in 1861 alongside the first Church of St. Michael and All Angels.		1861
II	St Paul's Anglican Church	3 Harewood Road, Papanui	Wooden church built 1877. Suffered significant damage during the February 2011 earthquake, but was later restored.		1877
II	St Peter's Church, Riccarton	24 Main South Road, Upper Riccarton	Anglican church built 1875.		1875
II	St Saviour's Chapel	17 Winchester Street, Lyttelton	Built 1886 in Winchester Street, Lyttelton and relocated to 26 Park Terrace, Christchurch in 1975. Moved back to Winchester Street, Lyttelton in 2013.		1886
I	Trinity Congregational Church	124 Worcester Street			1864–1870
I	Bridge of Remembrance	Cashel Street at Avon River	Bridge completed 1873. Memorial arch added 1923. Repaired and strengthened following the 2011 Christchurch earthquake and was rededicated on Anzac Day 2016.		1923–1924
I	Citizens' War Memorial	Cathedral Square			1933–1937
II	Cook Statue, Christchurch	Victoria Square			1929–1932
II	Edmonds' Clock Tower	Chester Street East			1929
I	Godley Statue	Cathedral Square			1864–1865
II	Queen Victoria Statue	Victoria Square			1901–1903
II	Scott Statue	153 Worcester Street	Toppled and broken in the 2011 Christchurch earthquake but reinstated in October 2017.		1916
I	Victoria Clock Tower	Victoria Street			1860
II	War Memorial Entrance Gates	70 Stevens Street, Waltham			1923
II	Woolston Borough Monument	Ferry Road, Woolston			1893
II		86–88 Chester Street East			n.d.
II		98–100 Chester Street East			n.d.
II		18 Beveridge Street			c.1880
II		383 Selwyn Street, Addington			c.1875
II		389 Selwyn Street, Addington			c.1874
II		391 Selwyn Street, Addington			c.1874
II		5 Shelley Street, Sydenham			c.1880
II		6 Shelley Street, Sydenham (cottage)			c.1878
II		13 Spencer Street, Addington (cottage)			c.1886
II	Curator's House	Botanical Gardens, Rolleston Avenue			1920
I	Chippenham Lodge	51 Browns Road, St Albans			1862
I	Deans Cottage	Riccarton Bush, 12 Kahu Road, Riccarton			1843
I	Dorset Street Flats	2–16 Dorset Street			1956–1957
II	Eliza's Manor on Bealey	82 Bealey Avenue			1861–1862
II	Elm Tree House	236 Papanui Road, Strowan			1920
II	England House	283 Papanui Road, Strowan			1925
I	Englefield Lodge	230 Fitzgerald Avenue, Richmond			c.1855–1856
II	Ferrymead Cob Cottage	2 Main Road, Mount Pleasant			1870–1871
II	Glenmore House	6 Pear Tree Lane, Hillsborough			c.1857
II	Greystones	104 Glandovey Road, Fendalton			n.d.
II	Halswell Quarry Stone House and Garden	Kennedys Bush Road, Halswell			1927
II	The Hollies	188 Richardson Terrace, Opawa			1871
II		14 Bass Street, Linwood			n.d.
II		63 Aldwins Road, Linwood			c.1898
I		45 Ranfurly Street, St Albans			1899
II		61 Tennyson Street, Sydenham			n.d.
II	Cobham	35 Knowles Street, St Albans			1908
II		41 Ranfurly Street, St Albans			1899
II		15 Worcester Boulevard			c.1897
II		17 Worcester Boulevard			1899
II		21 Worcester Boulevard			c.1898
II		23 Worcester Boulevard			1896–1897
II		56 Armagh Street			1874
II		74 Derby Street, Merivale			n.d.
II		66 Derby Street, Merivale			n.d.
II		70 Heaton Street, Merivale			n.d.
II		74 Heaton Street, Merivale			n.d.
II		98 Heaton Street, Merivale			n.d.
II		153 Holly Road			n.d.
I		2 Whisby Road, Cashmere			1898–1900
II		88 Brockworth Place, Riccarton			n.d.
II		23 Mandeville Street, Riccarton			Media related to House at 23 Mandeville Street at Wikimedia Commons
II		14 Fleming Street, North Beach			n.d.
II		196 Fitzgerald Avenue, Linwood			n.d.
II		82 Springfield Road, St Albans			n.d.
II	n.d.	41 Leinster Road, Merivale			n.d.
II		61 Leinster Road			n.d.
II		52 Longfellow Street, Sydenham			n.d.
II	n.d.	House at 44 Opawa Road			c.1867
II	Holbury (Tyndale House)	37 Hackthorne Road, Cashmere			n.d.
II		12 Glandovey Road, Fendalton			Media related to House at 12 Glandovey Road at Wikimedia Commons
II		27 Glandovey Road, Fendalton			n.d.
II		60 Glandovey Road, Fendalton			n.d.
II		70 Glandovey Road, Fendalton			n.d.
II		43 Holmwood Road, Merivale			n.d.
II		52 Wroxton Terrace			n.d.
II		9 Ford Road, Opawa			n.d.
II		41 Opawa Road, Opawa			n.d.
II		64 Opawa Road, Opawa			n.d.
II		16 Macmillan Avenue, Cashmere			n.d.
II	Inveresk	17 Armagh Street			c.1863
II	Isaac House	779 Colombo Street			1926
I	Kate Sheppard House	83 Clyde Road, Ilam			1888
II	Knowlescourt	274 Papanui Road, Strowan			n.d.
II	Larel	277 Papanui Road, Strowan			n.d.
II	Librarian's House	109 Cambridge Terrace			n.d.
II	Lintrathen	140 Glandovey Road			n.d.
II	Linwood House	30 Linwood Avenue, Linwood			1857
II	Long Cottage	157 Papanui Road, Merivale			n.d.
I	Los Angeles	110 Fendalton Road, Fendalton			c.1909–1913
II	Maisonettes	12–20 Bealey Ave			n.d.
II	Marli	118 Bealey Avenue			n.d.
II	McKellar House (Wesley Lodge Eventide Home)	138–148 Park Terrace			n.d.
I	McLean's Mansion	387 Manchester Street			c.1899–1900
II	Middleton Grange homestead	50 Acacia Avenue, Riccarton			n.d.
I	Mona Vale	63 Fendalton Road, Riccarton			1899–1900
II	Mona Vale gate house	65 Fendalton Road, Fendalton			n.d.
II		402 Montreal Street			1878
II		404 Montreal Street			c.1877
I	Ngaio Marsh House	37 Valley Road, Cashmere			1906–1907
II	Nurse Maude Medical Hospital (Formerly McDougall Residence)	24 McDougall Avenue, Merivale			n.d.
II	Old Stone House	30 Shalamar Drive, Cashmere			1870
II	Orana House	146 Papanui Road, Merivale			n.d.
II	Orari	38–42 Gloucester Street			c.1894
II	Parkdale	16 Heaton Street, Merivale			n.d.
II	Pascoe House	58 Colenso Street, Sumner			1948
I	Riccarton House	12 Kahu Road, Riccarton			1855–1856
II	Rise Cottage and Garden	10 Westenra Terrace, Cashmere			1924
II	Risingholme	22 Cholmondeley Avenue, Opawa			1864
II	Riverlaw	81 Aynsley Terrace, Opawa			n.d.
II	Rolleston House	2 Gloucester Street			1893
II	Santa Barbara	169 Victoria Street			1936
I	Shand's Emporium	88 Hereford Street			c.1860
II	Springbank	290 Riverlaw Terrace, Opawa			c.1860
II	St Elmo Courts	47 Hereford Street			1930
II	Stone Cottage	471 Ferry Road, Woolston			1863
II	Strowan House	347 Papanui Road, Strowan			n.d.
II	Te Koraha	59 Hewitts Road, Merivale			1886
II	Te Wepu	122 Papanui Road, Merivale			1882
II	The Tea House	171 Racecourse Road			1903
I	Tiptree Cottage	63 Savills Road, Harewood			c.1862–1868
II	Victoria Mansions	91 Victoria Street			1935–1936
II	Wahi Ruru	50 Heberden Avenue, Sumner			n.d.
II	Warren House	61 Papanui Road, Merivale			n.d.
II	Warwick House	52 Armagh Street			n.d.
II	West Avon Flats	279 Montreal Street			1936
I	Weston House	62 Park Terrace			1924
II	Whalebone Cottage	704 Ferry Road, Woolston			1867
II	Whareora	63 Dyers Pass Road, Cashmere			n.d.
II	Wharetiki House	854 Colombo Street			1902–1904
II	Whitcombe House	122 Park Terrace			n.d.
II	Addington Prison	Lincoln Road, Addington			1874
I	Addington Water Tower	Clarence Street, Addington			1882–1883
I	Antigua Boat Sheds	2 Cambridge Terrace			1882
II	Armagh Street Bridge	Armagh Street, Eastern crossing of the Avon River			1883
II	Armagh Street Park Bridge	Armagh Street crossing of the Avon River to North Hagley Park			1885
II	Beaths Department Store Building	682–690 Colombo Street			1935
I	Bishopspark	100 Park Terrace			1926
II	Bandsmen's Memorial Rotunda	Botanical Gardens, Riccarton Avenue			1926
II	Canterbury Club	129 Cambridge Terrace			c.1873–1874
II	Canterbury Club Gas Light	129 Cambridge Terrace (on footpath outside the Canterbury Club)			n.d.
II	Canterbury Club Hitching Post	129 Cambridge Terrace (on footpath outside the Canterbury Club)			c.1880
II	Canterbury Cricket Umpires' Association Pavilion	Riccarton Avenue, Hagley Oval, South Hagley Park			1864
II	Canterbury Horse Bazaar	141 Lichfield Street			n.d.
II	Canterbury Jockey Club Building	128 Oxford Terrace			n.d.
I	Canterbury Museum	15 Rolleston Avenue			1870
I	Canterbury Provincial Council Buildings	280–284 Durham Street			1857–1859
I	Canterbury Public Library (former), 1870s section	109 Cambridge Terrace			n.d.
II	Canterbury Public Library (former), 1900s and 1920s section	Hereford Street			n.d.
I	Canterbury Society of Arts Gallery	282–286 Durham Street			1890
II	Cashfields	154–158 Cashel Street			n.d.
II	Cathedral Grammar School Main Block	8 Chester Street West			n.d.
I	Chief Post Office, Christchurch	15 Cathedral Square			1877–1879
I	Christchurch Arts Centre	Worcester Boulevard, Hereford Street and Rolleston Avenue			1877–1879
I	Christchurch Boys' High School (main block)	39 Kahu Road, Riccarton			n.d.
I	Christchurch Club	154 Worcester Street			1860–1862
II	Christchurch Technical College Assembly Hall	369 Moorhouse Avenue			n.d.
II	Christchurch West High School	510 Hagley Avenue			1924
I	Christ's College Big School	33 Rolleston Avenue			1863
I	Christ's College Chapel	33 Rolleston Avenue			1867
I	Christ's College Hare Memorial Library	33 Rolleston Avenue			1915
II	Christ's College Jacobs House	33 Rolleston Ave			1930–1931
I	Christ's College Memorial Dining Room	33 Rolleston Avenue			1922–1925
II	Christ's College open air classrooms	33 Rolleston Avenue			1929–1930
II	Christ's College School House	33 Rolleston Avenue			1909–1910
II	Civic Offices, Tuam Street	163–173 Tuam Street			n.d.
II	Clarendon Hotel Façade	78 Worcester Street			1903
II	Colombo Street Bridge	Colombo Street crossing the Avon River			1902
II	Cuningham House	Botanical Gardens, Rolleston Avenue			1923–1924
II	Duncan's Buildings	135–165 High Street			n.d.
II	Dux de Lux	Montreal Street	Built in 1882 Llanmaes was built as a private home. It later became the home of the University of Canterbury Students' Association.		1883
II	Edmonds Band Rotunda	230 Cambridge Terrace	Built 1929. Badly damaged by earthquakes in 2010 and 2011. The dome was salvaged, but the rest of the rotunda was replaced.		1929
II	Edmonds' Clock Tower	Chester Street East			1929
I	Excelsior Hotel, Christchurch	120 Manchester Street			c.1881–1882
I	Fisher's Building	280 High Street			1880
II	Gas Company Building (Christchurch)	94 Gloucester Street			n.d.
II	Girl Guide Headquarters	221 Armagh Street			n.d.
I	Girls' Training Hostel (Former)	90 Ensors Road, Opawa			1912–1913
II	Gloucester Street Bridge	Gloucester Street crossing the Avon River			1886
I	Guthrey Centre	124–126 Cashel Street			c.1881
II	Hamish Hay Bridge	Victoria Square across the Avon River			1863–1864
I	Harald's Building	80 Lichfield Street			n.d.
II	Harley Buildings	137 Cambridge Terrace			1929
II	Helmore's Lane Bridge	Helmore's Lane, Merivale			1866
II	Hutchinson Motors Building (formerly Ford Motors)	182–186 Tuam Street			n.d.
I	Jubilee Hospital Complex	20 Jubilee Street, Woolston			n.d.
II	Kenton Chambers	190–192 Hereford Street			n.d.
II	Lansdowne Stables	Old Tai Tapu Road, Halswell			n.d.
II	Linwood Public Library (Former)	388 Worcester Street, Linwood			1885
I	Lyttelton Rail Tunnel	Lyttelton Line, Heathcote Valley			1876–1877
I	Lyttelton Road Tunnel Administration Building	1 Bridle Path Road, Heathcote Valley			1963–1964
I	Lyttelton Times Building	56 Cathedral Square			1902–1904
I	Magistrates' Court, Christchurch	85 Armagh Street			1880–1881
II	Malthouse, Christchurch	69–71 Colombo Street, Beckenham			1867
I	Manchester Courts	158–160 Manchester Street			1905–1906
II	McKenzie & Willis Store	181 High Street	Due to earthquake damage the building was demolished in 2015 but the facade was kept and restored.		1910
II	MED Building	218 Manchester Street			n.d.
II	Midland Club (former)	176–178 Oxford Terrace	Damaged in the 2011 Christchurch earthquake. Sold in 2015, and renovated in 2018.		1934
I	Moncks Cave	Main Road, Redcliffs			n.d.
II	New City Hotel	527–533 Colombo Street			1930
I	New Regent Street Terrace Shops	New Regent Street			1930–1932
I	New Zealand Loan and Mercantile Woolstore (former)	116–118 Durham Street, Sydenham			n.d.
II	NZ Trust and Loan Building	84 Hereford Street			n.d.
I	Odeon Theatre (Christchurch)	214 Tuam Street			1883
I	Christchurch Municipal Chambers	159 Oxford Terrace			1886–1887
I	Old Government Building, Christchurch	28 Cathedral Square			1910–1913
II	P & D Duncan Building	204 St Asaph Street			1903–1904
II	Papanui Railway Station	24 Restell Street, Papanui			1900
II	Pegasus Press Building	14 Oxford Terrace			1852
II	Perry's Occidental Hotel	208 Hereford Street			n.d.
II	Peterborough Centre	Peterborough Street			1930
II	Pink Pussy Cat Building (Formerly Lawrie & Wilson Auctioneers)	196–210 Tuam Street			1910
II	Public Trust Office Building, Christchurch	152–156 Oxford Terrace			1925
II	R Buchanan & Sons Building	206–210 St Asaph Street			1904–1905
I	Registry Building	40 Worcester Boulevard			1916
II	Repertory Theatre, Christchurch	144–148 Kilmore Street			n.d.
I	Rhodes Memorial Home	34 Dyers Pass Road, Cashmere			n.d.
I	Robert McDougall Art Gallery	9 Rolleston Avenue			1928–1932
II	Shirley Community Centre (Former Shirley Primary School)	10 Shirley Road, Shirley			n.d.
I	Sign of the Kiwi	Dyers Pass, Cashmere			1916–c.1917
I	Sign of the Takahe	176 Hackthorne Road, Cashmere			1918–1948
II	St George's Private Hospital	251 Papanui Road, Strowan			n.d.
II	St Margaret's College (former)	25 Chester Street West			1913–1914
II	Star Building (Formerly Lyttelton Times Building)	134–140 Gloucester Street			n.d.
II	State Insurance Building, Christchurch	116 Worcester Street			n.d.
I	Strange's Building	219–223 High Street			n.d.
I	Sunnyside Hospital Administration Building (Former) and Setting	32 Annex Road, Middleton			n.d.
I	Theatre Royal, Christchurch	145 Gloucester Street			1906–1908
II	Theatre Royal Building (former)	148–154 Gloucester Street			n.d.
II	Trade Union Building, Christchurch	194 Gloucester Street			n.d.
II	Victory Memorial School	140 Springfield Road, St Albans			n.d.
II	Pump House, Christchurch	544 Tuam Street, Phillipstown			1882
I	Wellington Woollen Manufacturing Company Building (Former)	96–98 Lichfield Street, Christchurch Central City			1919
II	Wood Bros Flour Mill	14–24 Wise Street, Addington	Has been altered and converted into apartments.		1891
II	Worcester Chambers	69 Worcester Street			1924–1925
II	Worcester Street Bridge	Worcester Street/Boulevard crossing the Avon River			1885
II	YWCA Building, Christchurch	268 Madras Street			n.d.
II	Zetland Hotel, Christchurch	88–92 Cashel Street			n.d.

== List of lost historic places ==
The following listings have been lost; most of them due to the Christchurch earthquakes.

Category	Name	Address	Suburb/note	Photo	Commons category link
II		9 Aynsley Terrace	Demolished		
II		303 Ferry Road, Phillipstown	Lost to fire.		
II		100 Bealey Avenue	Demolished 2012.		Media related to 100 Bealey Avenue at Wikimedia Commons
II		232 Opawa Road, Opawa	Demolished 2012.		
II		112 Centaurus Road, Cashmere	Demolished 2011.		
II		116 Centaurus Road, Cashmere	Demolished 2011.		
II		5 The Spur, Clifton	Demolished 2015.		
II	A & T Burt Building (former Nugget Boot Polish Factory)	580 Ferry Road	Woolston		Media related to A & T Burt building at Wikimedia Commons
I	A.J. White's Department Store (Former)	236 Tuam Street	Christchurch Central City		Media related to A.J. White's Department Store at Wikimedia Commons
II	ANZ Bank, Christchurch	188 High Street	Christchurch Central City		Media related to ANZ Bank, Christchurch at Wikimedia Commons
II	Armstrongs Building, Christchurch	91–107 Armagh Street	Christchurch Central City		Media related to Armstrongs Building, Christchurch at Wikimedia Commons
II	Avon Theatre	86–88 Worcester Street	Christchurch Central City		Media related to Avon Theatre at Wikimedia Commons
II	Beaufort House	2 Latimer Square	Christchurch Central City		Media related to Beaufort House at Wikimedia Commons
II	Beckenham Baptist Church	146 Colombo Street	Beckenham		Media related to Beckenham Baptist Church at Wikimedia Commons
I	Cathedral of the Blessed Sacrament, Christchurch	136 Barbadoes Street	Roman Catholic cathedral built 1901–1905. Damaged during the February 2011 earthquake. Demolished in 2020 and 2021.		Media related to Cathedral of the Blessed Sacrament, Christchurch at Wikimedia Commons
II	Caledonian Hall	135 Kilmore Street	Christchurch Central City		Media related to Caledonian Hall at Wikimedia Commons
II	Canterbury Television Building	202 Gloucester Street	Christchurch Central City		Media related to TVNZ Building, Christchurch at Wikimedia Commons
II	Carlton Hotel	21 Bealey Avenue	Merivale		Media related to Carlton Hotel, Christchurch at Wikimedia Commons
II	Christchurch Railway Station (former)	386–392 Moorhouse Avenue	Christchurch Central City		Media related to Christchurch railway station, Moorhouse Avenue at Wikimedia Commons
II	The Civic	194–198 Manchester Street	Christchurch Central City		Media related to Civic, Christchurch at Wikimedia Commons
I	Church of the Good Shepherd, Christchurch	42 Phillips Street, Phillipstown	Demolished following the February 2011 earthquake.		Media related to Church of the Good Shepherd, Christchurch at Wikimedia Commons
II	Christ's College Classrooms 1915–21	33 Rolleston Ave	Christchurch Central City		
II	Coachman Inn	144 Gloucester Street	Christchurch Central City		Media related to Coachman Inn at Wikimedia Commons
I	Community of the Sacred Name	181 Barbadoes Street	Demolished following the February 2011 earthquake.		Media related to Community of the Sacred Name at Wikimedia Commons
II	Cottage and former shop at 387 Selwyn Street	387 Selwyn Street	Addington		
II	Country Glen Lodge	107 Bealey Avenue, St Albans	Built 1896, demolished 2012.		Media related to Country Glen Lodge at Wikimedia Commons
II	Cracroft House	151 Cashmere Road, Cashmere	Cob cottage built 1854–1856. Gifted to the Girl Guides Association in 1958. Demolished 2012.		Media related to Cracroft House, Christchurch at Wikimedia Commons
I	Cranmer Bridge Club	25 Armagh Street	Demolished following te February 2011 earthquake.		Media related to Cranmer Bridge Club at Wikimedia Commons
I	Cranmer Centre	40 Armagh Street	Built to house Christchurch Girls' High School. Demolished 2012.		Media related to Cranmer Centre at Wikimedia Commons
I	Cranmer Court	53 Kilmore Street	Demolished in 2012.		Media related to Cranmer Court at Wikimedia Commons
I	Daresbury	67 Fendalton Road, Fendalton	Originally Daresbury Stables. Built 1903, demolished 2011.		Media related to Daresbury (house) at Wikimedia Commons
II	The Deanery	80 Bealey Avenue	Built 1926. Collapsed during the February 2011 earthquake.		Media related to The Deanery, Christchurch at Wikimedia Commons
I	Durham Street Methodist Church	Durham Street	Collapsed during the February 2011 earthquake.		Media related to Durham Street Methodist Church at Wikimedia Commons
II	Elizabeth House	6 Circuit Street, Strowan	Built 1914, demolished 2011.		Media related to Elizabeth House, Christchurch at Wikimedia Commons
II	Fleming House, aka Wesley Lodge	138–148 Park Terrace	Demolished 2013		Media related to Fleming House, Christchurch at Wikimedia Commons
II	Girl Guide Headquarters	221 Armagh Street	Demolished July 2018		Media related to Girl Guide Headquarters, Christchurch at Wikimedia Commons
II	Hadleigh	6 Eversleigh Street, St Albans	Demolished 2011.		Media related to Hadleigh, Christchurch at Wikimedia Commons
II	Hagley House	6 Wood Lane, Fendalton	Demolished 2010.		Media related to Hagley House, Christchurch at Wikimedia Commons
I	Holy Trinity Avonside	122 Avonside Drive, Linwood	Demolished following the February 2011 earthquake.		Media related to Holy Trinity Avonside at Wikimedia Commons
II	House at 17 Rossall Street	17 Rossall Street	Fendalton		Media related to House at 17 Rossall Street at Wikimedia Commons
II	House (former Daresbury Stables)	7 Daresbury Lane	Fendalton		
I	Music Centre of Christchurch	Barbadoes Street	Main building demolished following the February 2011 earthquake.		Media related to Music Centre of Christchurch at Wikimedia Commons
II	Nazareth House Chapel	216 Brougham Street, Sydenham	Demolished and replaced following the February 2011 earthquake.		Media related to Nazareth House Chapel at Wikimedia Commons
II	Oxford Terrace Baptist Church	288 Oxford Terrace	Built 1882. Collapsed during the February 2011 earthquake.		Media related to Oxford Terrace Baptist Church at Wikimedia Commons
I	The Press Building, Christchurch	32 Cathedral Square			Media related to The Press Building, Christchurch at Wikimedia Commons
I	Regent Theatre, Christchurch	39 Cathedral Square			Media related to Regent Theatre, Christchurch at Wikimedia Commons
II	Rosary House	128 Park Terrace	Built in 1915 and designed by architect Edward England. The Sisters of Mercy who purchased the property in 1955 and ran it as a hostel for women university students. Demolished in 2012.		Media related to Rosary House at Wikimedia Commons
II	Sevicke Jones Building	53 Cathedral Square	Christchurch Central City		Media related to Sevicke Jones Building at Wikimedia Commons
II	Shirley Community Centre	10 Shirley Road	Shirley		Media related to Shirley Community Centre at Wikimedia Commons
II	Sisters of Our Lady of the Missions Convent	Barbadoes Street	Built in 1881 for the Sisters of Our Lady of the Missions. Demolished 2012.		Media related to Sisters of Our Lady of the Missions Convent at Wikimedia Commons
II	St Albans Wesleyan Church, Christchurch (Former)	163 Papanui Road	Merivale		Media related to St Albans Wesleyan Church at Wikimedia Commons
I	St John the Baptist Church	234 Hereford Street	Damaged during the February 2011 earthquake and later demolished. Now the site of the Cardboard Cathedral.		Media related to St John the Baptist Church, Christchurch at Wikimedia Commons
II	St Luke's Church, Christchurch	248 Manchester Street	Partially collapsed during the February 2011 earthquake and later demolished.		Media related to St Lukes Church, Christchurch at Wikimedia Commons
I	St Paul's Church, Christchurch	236 Cashel Street	Presbyterian church built 1877. Damaged by arson in 2009, the building was restored, but suffered further damage in the September 2010 and February 2011 earthquakes. By June 2011, the church had been demolished.		
II	Sydenham Heritage Church	343 Colombo Street	Sydenham		Media related to Sydenham Heritage Church at Wikimedia Commons
II	Sydenham Post Office	340 Colombo Street	Sydenham		Media related to Sydenham Post Office at Wikimedia Commons
II	Theosophical Society Building	267 Cambridge Terrace	Built 1926 and demolished in 2012.		Media related to Theosophical Society Building, Christchurch at Wikimedia Commons
II	Twentymen & Cousins Store	93 Cashel Street	Christchurch Central City		Media related to Twentymen & Cousins Store at Wikimedia Commons
II	Warner's Hotel	50 Cathedral Square	Christchurch Central City		Media related to Warner's Hotel at Wikimedia Commons
II	90–92 Chester Street	90–92 Chester Street East	Christchurch Central City		Media related to 90–92 Chester Street, Christchurch at Wikimedia Commons
II	94–96 Chester Street	94–96 Chester Street East	Christchurch Central City		Media related to 94–96 Chester Street, Christchurch at Wikimedia Commons

== List of historic areas ==
Name	Location	Suburb	Photo	Commons category link
Cashmere Drains Historic Area	Cashmere Stream, Cashmere Valley Drain and Ballintine's Drain	Cashmere		
Church of St Mary the Virgin Historic Area	Church Square	Addington		Media related to Church of St Mary the Virgin Historic Area at Wikimedia Commons
Englefield Historic Area	Avon River & Avonside, Fitzgerald, Hamner & Elm	Linwood		Media related to Englefield Historic Area at Wikimedia Commons
Godley Head Battery Historic Area	Godley Head	Sumner		Media related to Godley Head Battery Historic Area at Wikimedia Commons
New Regent Street Historic Area	New Regent Street	Christchurch Central City		Media related to New Regent Street at Wikimedia Commons
Park Terrace Historic Area	Park Terrace	Christchurch Central City		Media related to Park Terrace Historic Area at Wikimedia Commons
Wards Brewery Historic Area	Fitzgerald Ave, Kilmore Street, Chester Street East	Christchurch Central City		Media related to Wards Brewery Historic Area at Wikimedia Commons

== See also ==
- 2010 Canterbury earthquake
- 2011 Christchurch earthquake
- June 2011 Christchurch earthquake
- List of historic places in Dunedin
