= Midland Club Building =

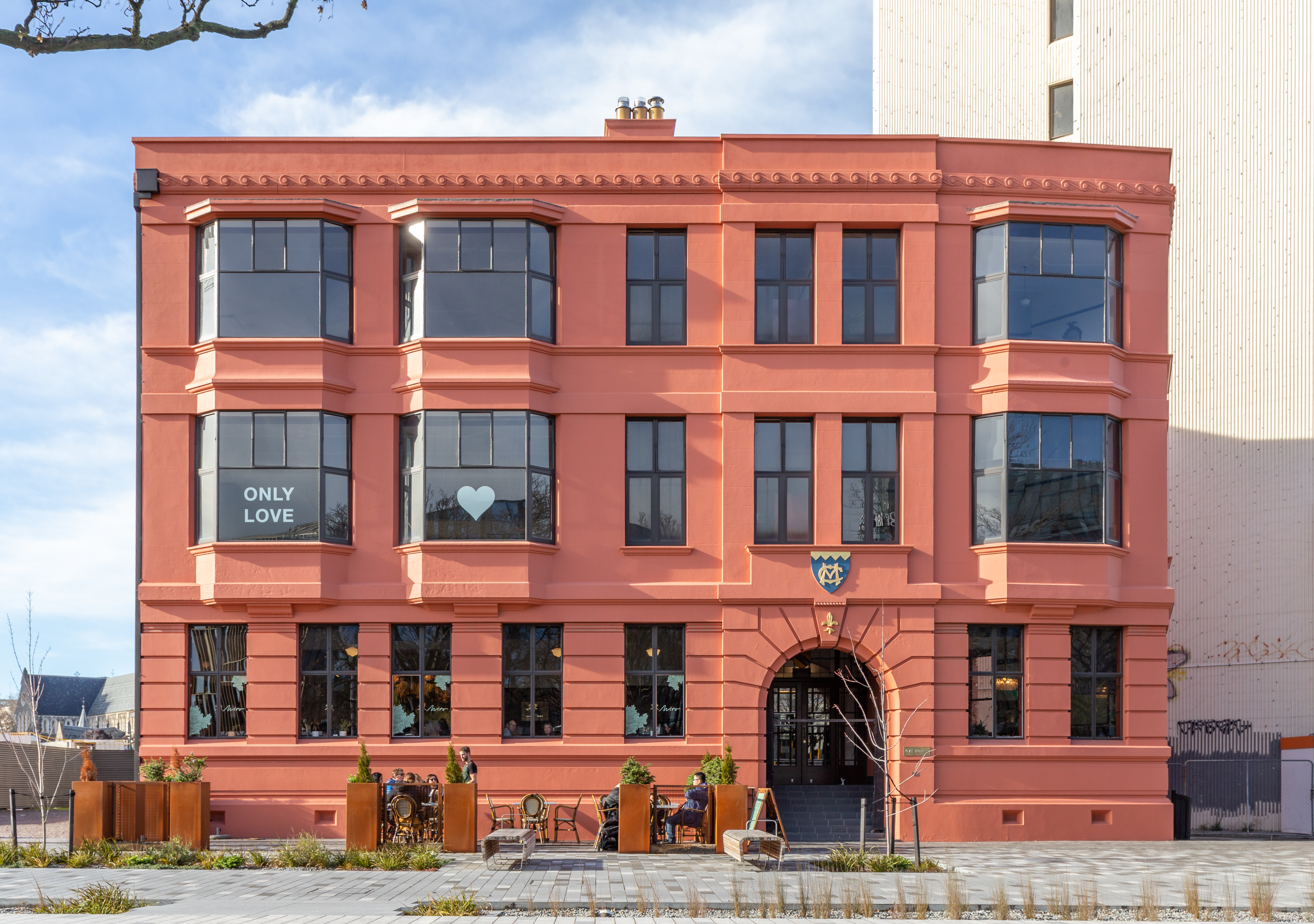
- The Midland Club Building, 2019
- Interactive map of the Midland Club Building area

General information
- Type: Commercial and hospitality enterprises
- Architectural style: Renaissance palazzo style
- Location: Christchurch Central City, 176–178 Oxford Terrace, Christchurch, New Zealand
- Coordinates: 43.5303°S 172.6342°E
- Completed: 1934
- Renovated: 2018
- Owner: Club Lane Ltd

Technical details
- Floor count: Three
- Lifts/elevators: One

Design and construction
- Architecture firm: Collins and West

Renovating team
- Renovating firm: ThreeSixty Architecture
- Awards and prizes: Canterbury Heritage Awards (2018)

Heritage New Zealand – Category 2
- Designated: 11 November 1981
- Reference no.: 3123

References
- "Midland Club (Former)". New Zealand Heritage List/Rārangi Kōrero. Heritage New Zealand.

The former Midland Club Building (also known as Caffe Roma building) is a heritage-listed building located in Central Christchurch, New Zealand. The building once house the Midland Club, which ceased in 1991, after which, the building was sold. It housed Caffe Roma until the 2011 Canterbury earthquake caused significant damage. It was later restored, and strengthened in 2018. It is one of the few remaining multi-storey brick heritage buildings left in the city, post-earthquake.

== History ==
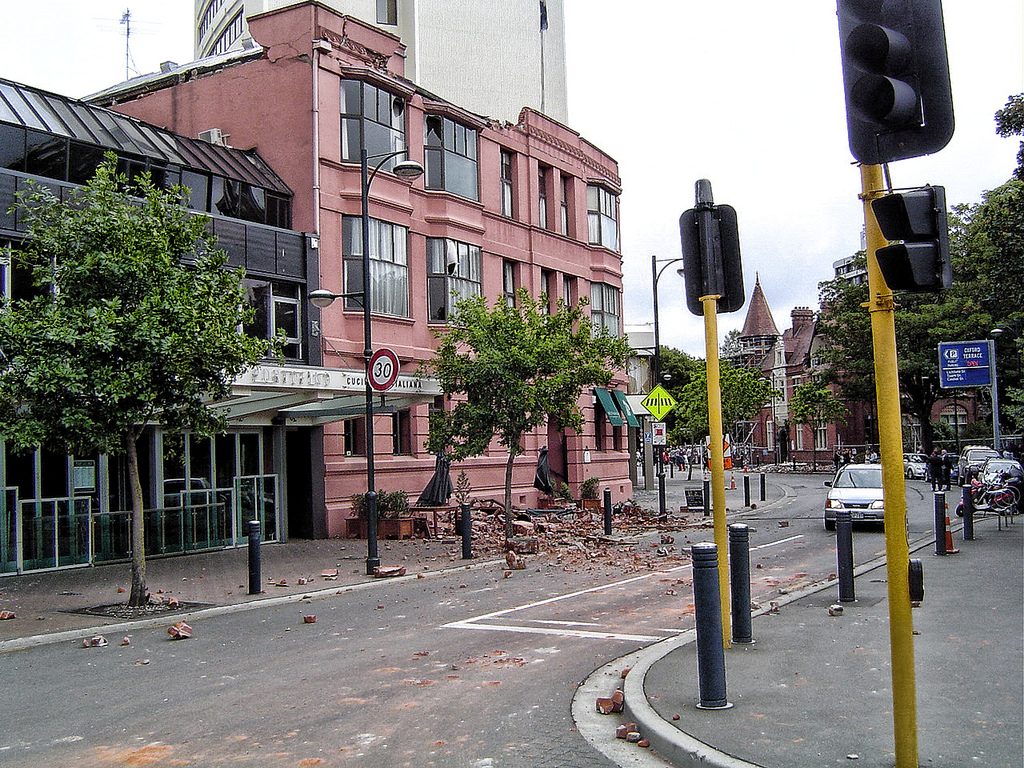
Caffe Roma, with collapsed parapets, following the 2011 Canterbury earthquake

The building was built in 1934, in the renaissance palazzo style, by Christchurch architect firm, Collins and West. Upon the building's completion, the Midland Club (a gentleman's club), moved into the premises from their outgrown site on Worcester Street. The Midland Club operated until 1991, when the disbanded and sold the building. From then, until the 2011 Canterbury earthquake, it housed Caffe Roma, a popular café, a hair salon, offices and an apartment on the top floor.

=== Earthquake damage ===
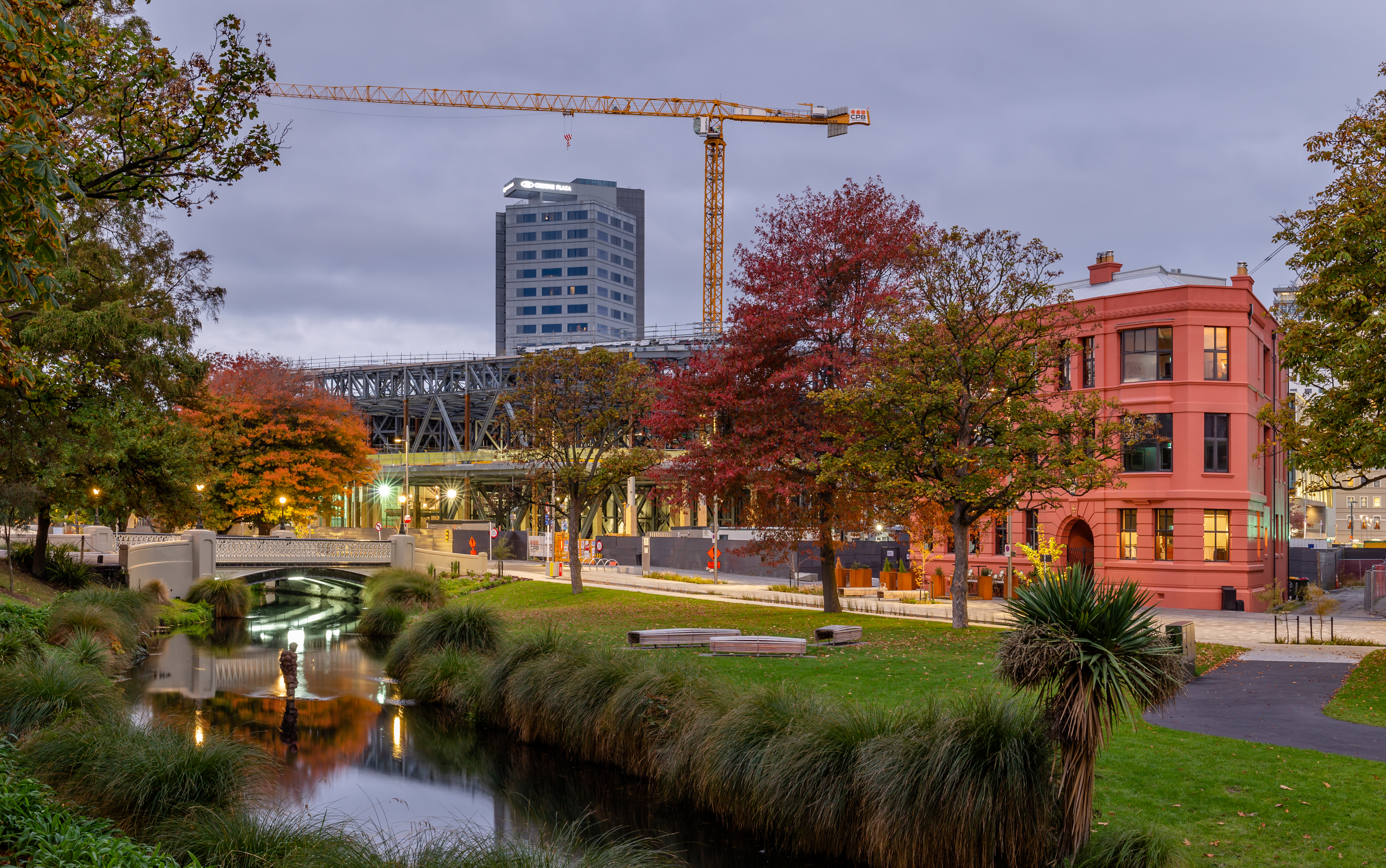
The Midland Building, following completed renovations, April 2019

The building suffered from damage during the 2010 and 2011 Canterbury earthquakes, with the loss of the chimneys and partial loss of its parapet, both collapsing during the 2011 earthquake. As a result, the remaining parapets were taken down. The building was later abandoned and became a target for squatters and vandals, however, their behaviour did not damage any of the building's heritage features.

=== Renovation ===
In 2015, the building was purchased by Club Lane Ltd., who are owned by company Box 112 for NZ$1.35m. Box 112 also purchased, restored and renovated other heritage buildings in Christchurch, including the Public Trust Office Building. The owners of Club Lane Ltd., brothers Sean and Rob Farrell also completed renovations to the Isaac Theatre Royal, through their construction company. After the previous owner, Alberto Ceccarelli received engineering reports stating that the building could not be economically saved, restoration went ahead, with Club Lane Ltd. receiving a NZ$869,500 heritage grant from the Christchurch City Council.

After completing emergency weatherproofing to prevent further deterioration, the building was renovated and strengthened to 100% of the New Zealand building code. Lost features from the earthquake, such as the parapets, were replaced with a lightweight form. The building now has a steel core, a steel framed roof, steel tensioning rods in the bricks, and concrete and plywood bracing the original timber floors. The building still contains its original light fittings and caged lift. The stained-glass windows were restored and repaired, the radiators were fixed, and the open fireplaces are among the few allowed to be lit in the central city.

The building was reopened in 2018, with new tenants including Miro, Crane Brothers clothing store, and a philanthropy company. As a result of the restoration work carried out by architect firm, ThreeSixty Architecture, the building received a highly commended award at the 2018 Canterbury Heritage Awards.

== See also ==
- List of historic places in Christchurch
