= Sevicke Jones Building =

Former building in Christchurch, New Zealand

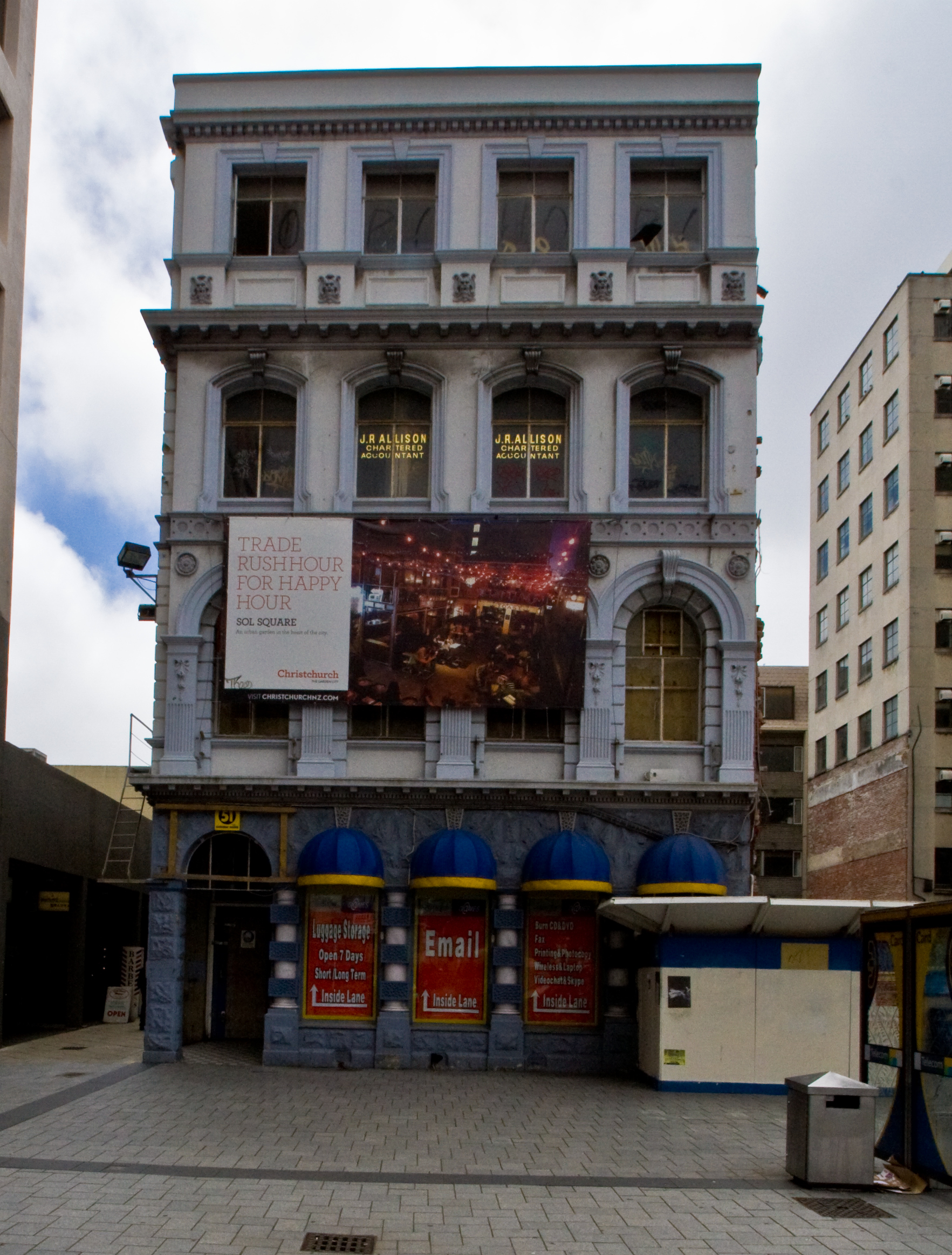
- Sevicke Jones Building in January 2010

General information
- Architectural style: North-Western Italian architecture
- Address: 53 Cathedral Square

Heritage New Zealand – Category 2
- Designated: 28 April 1995
- Reference no.: 7226

The Sevicke Jones Building was a building in Cathedral Square of Christchurch, New Zealand. Designed in 1913 and 1914 with a North-Western Italian architecturural style, it was listed by Heritage New Zealand as a Category II historic place in April 1995. It was demolished in 2011 after it partially collapsed in the 2011 Christchurch earthquake.

== History ==
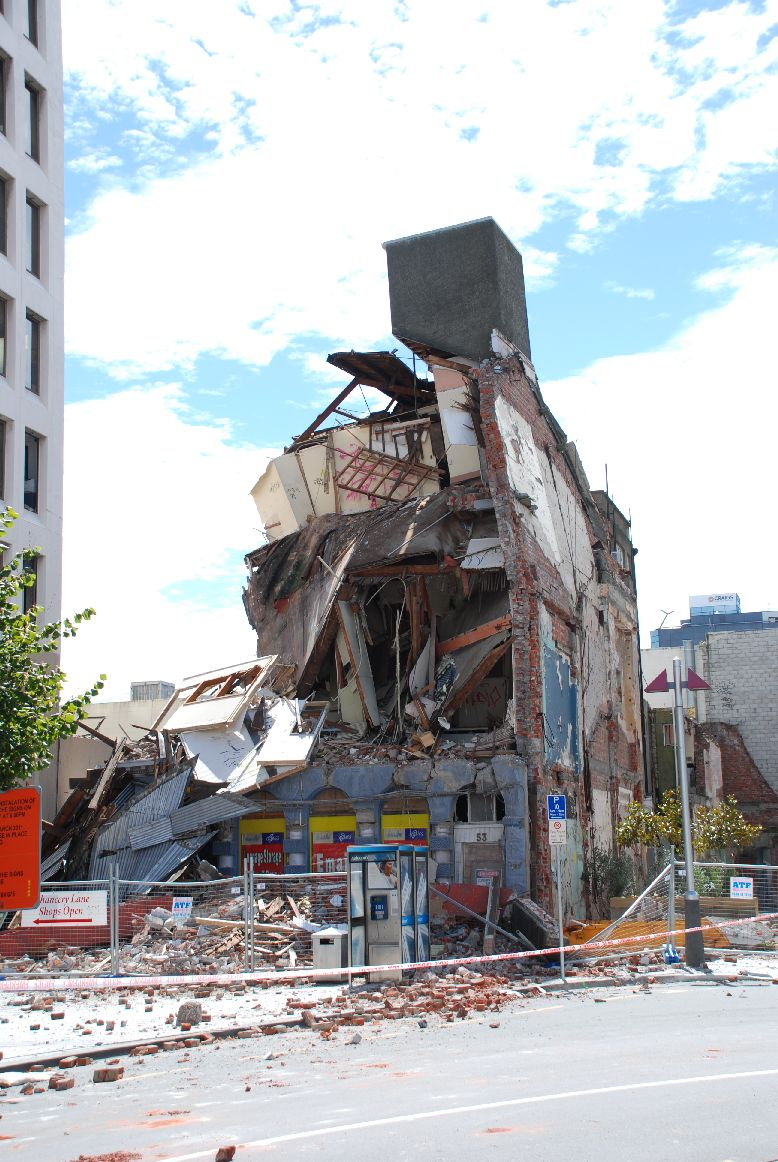
The Sevicke Jones Building on 24 February 2011

The Sevicke Jones Building was designed in 1913 and 1914 by Collins and Harman, an architectural firm that designed numerous other buildings in Christchurch, including The Press Building. The building had a North-Western Italian architectural style and was originally three storeys high, but had a fourth floor added in 1937.

In 1993 a fire caused damage to the building and in 1994 it was sold to the company Number 33 Garlan Limited, which was owned by a Singaporean property developer. The Sevicke Jones Building was registered by Heritage New Zealand as a Category II historic place in April 1995.

In the early 2000s the ground floor of the building was used as an Internet café. The Sevicke Jones Building and the Tivoli Theatre neighbouring it was bought in 2003 by the property developer David Henderson with the intention of developing a "tourist facility". In 2008 Henderson put the precinct that building was in up for sale, which included the Sevicke Jones Building and the land of the theatre, which had been demolished.

After partially collapsing in the 2011 Christchurch earthquake, the building was demolished by the Canterbury Earthquake Recovery Authority. In 2013 the authority bought the land the building was once on, for the Convention Centre Precinct, which later became the home for the new Te Pae Christchurch Convention Centre.
