= Curator's House =

Historic building in Christchurch, New Zealand

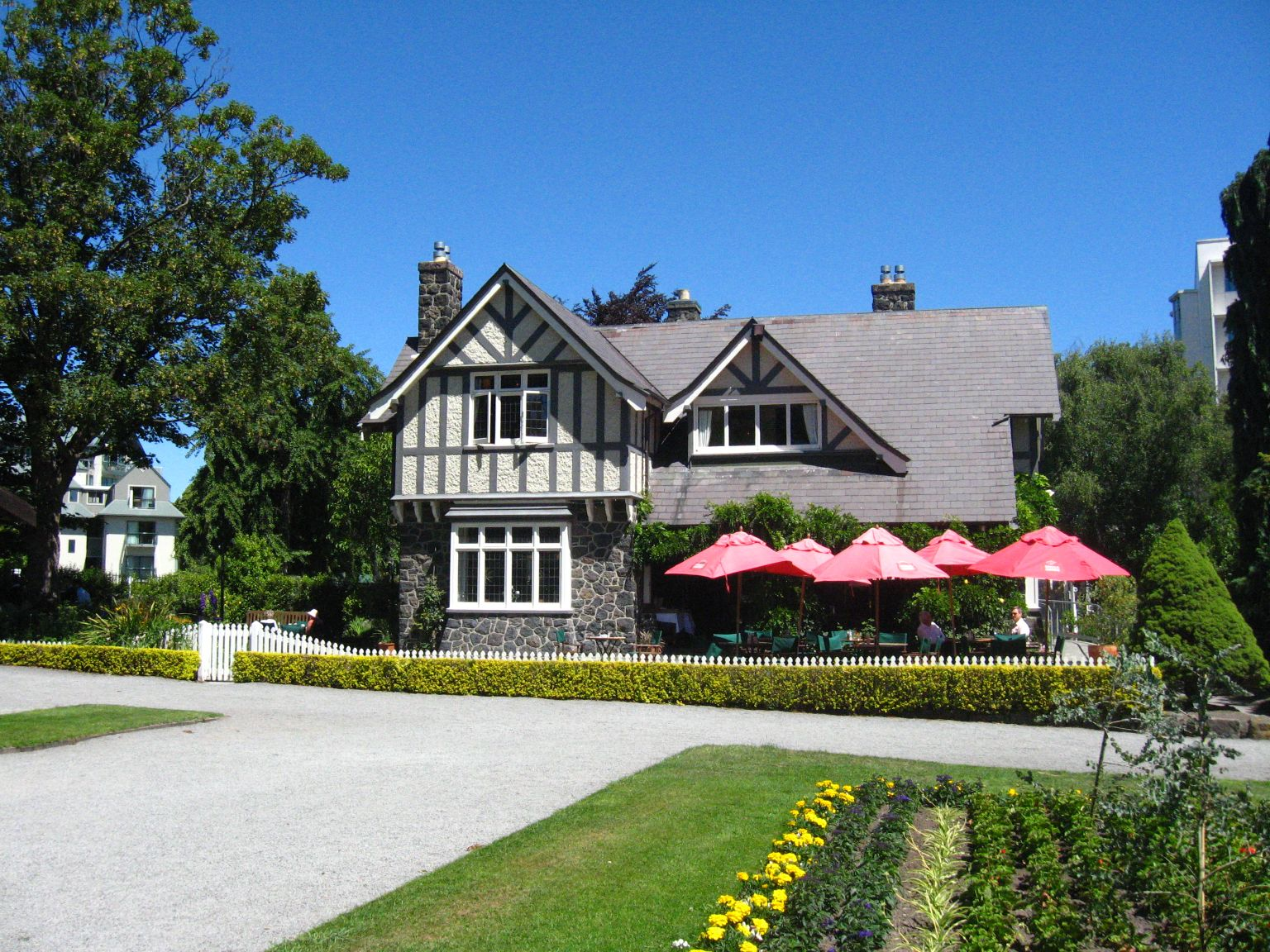
- Interactive map of the Curator's House area

General information
- Architectural style: Tudor Revival architecture
- Location: 7 Rolleston Avenue, Christchurch, New Zealand
- Coordinates: 43.532677°S 172.627156°E
- Owner: Christchurch City Council

Height
- Roof: slate

Technical details
- Floor count: two

Design and construction
- Architect: Collins and Harman

Website
- curatorshouse.co.nz

Heritage New Zealand – Category 2
- Designated: 26 November 1981
- Reference no.: 1863

References
- "Curator's House". New Zealand Heritage List/Rārangi Kōrero. Heritage New Zealand.

The Curator's House is a historic building in the Christchurch Botanic Garden, in Christchurch, New Zealand. It was built for the Curator of the Botanic Gardens in 1920 and it is now home to a restaurant, called The Curator's House.

== History ==
On the same site as the present Curator's House, a single-storey timber building was constructed in 1872 for the Christchurch Domain Curator, John Armstrong. By 1919, the original wooden building was in poor condition and the current Curator's House was built in its place in 1920. The Architectural firm Collins and Harman were employed in 1919 to design a two storied brick house with a slate roof. It was finished in 1920 and the house was the residence for the curators of the Botanic Gardens up until 1984. In 2000 it was renovated into a restaurant.

=== Heritage registration ===
The building was registered as a heritage building by the New Zealand Historic Places Trust on 26 November 1981 with registration number 1863 classified as Category II listing. The Christchurch City Council also lists the Curator's House as a Heritage Place for its "high historical and social significance for its association with the development and history of the Christchurch Botanic Gardens".

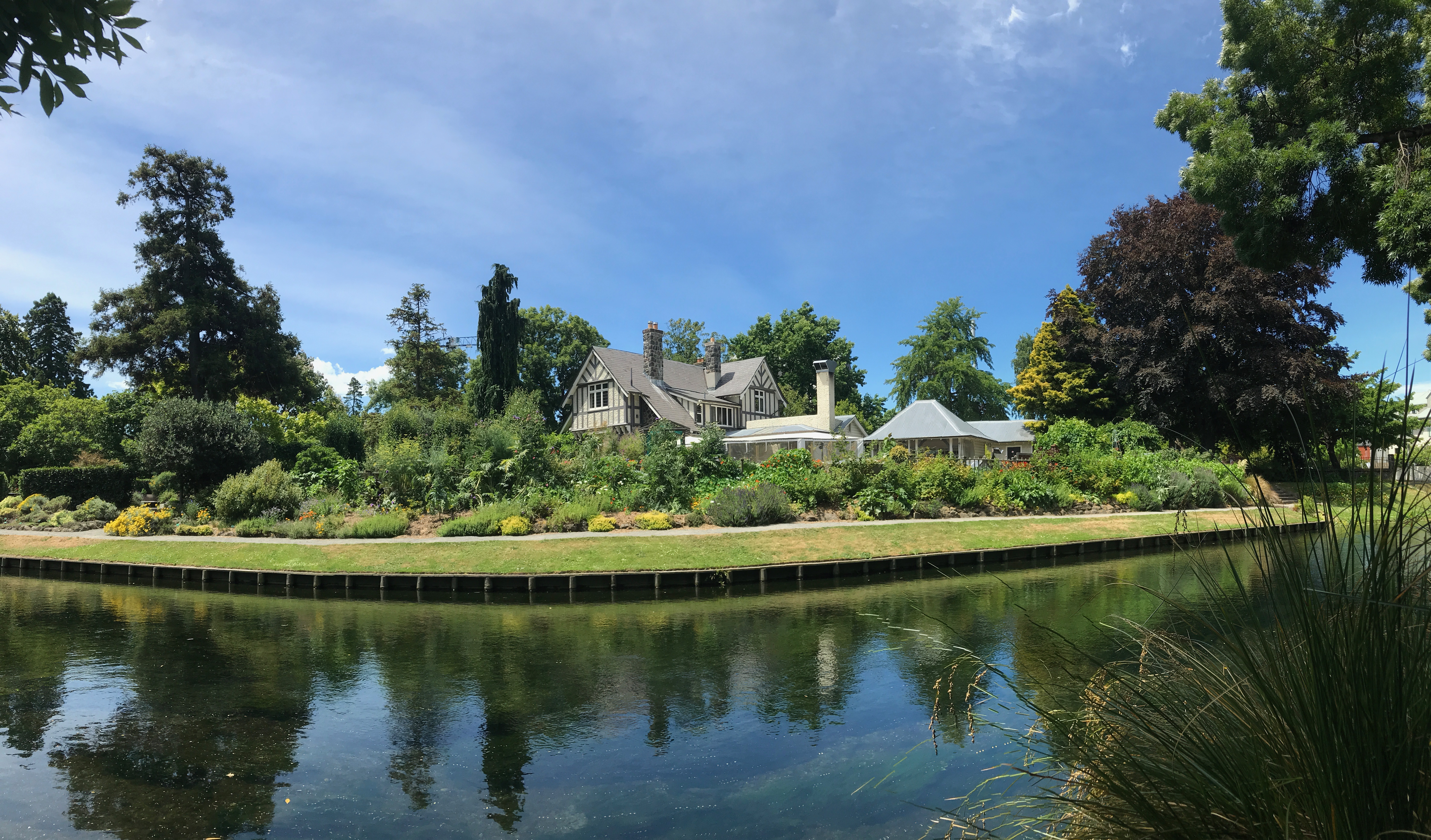
The Curator's House and the Avon River

== See also ==
- List of historic places in Christchurch
