= Magistrates' Court, Christchurch =

Former court building in Christchurch, New Zealand

Magistrates' Court
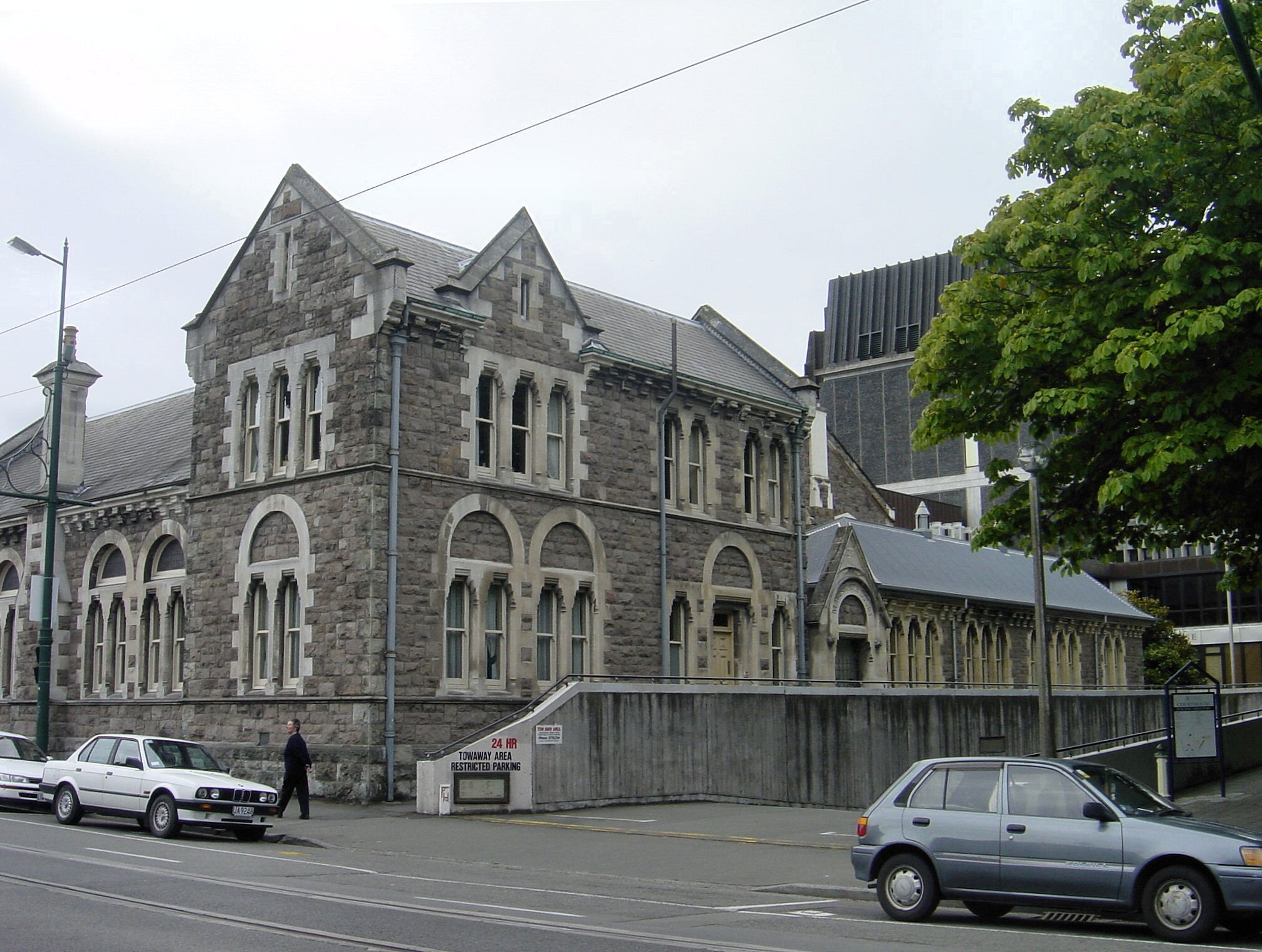
- The former Magistrate's Court in 2007
- Interactive map of the Magistrates' Court area

General information
- Type: Court
- Architectural style: Gothic Revival architecture
- Location: Christchurch Central City, 85 Armagh Street, Christchurch, New Zealand
- Coordinates: 43.52853°S 172.63422°E
- Current tenants: Millie's Court House (childcare centre)
- Completed: 1880

Technical details
- Floor count: 2
- Floor area: 650 square metres (7,000 sq ft)

Design and construction
- Architect: Benjamin Mountfort

Heritage New Zealand – Category 1
- Designated: 1991-08-08
- Reference no.: 5308

The former Magistrates' Court is a heritage-listed court building in Christchurch, New Zealand. It was built in 1880 and was used as a court building until 2017.

== History ==
The first Christchurch Supreme Court building was opened in 1870, but there was a need for a smaller adjoining court for minor local matters to be heard in. The building that had previously been used for such matters was a small wooden construction that was in serious disrepair by the late 1870s. Architect Benjamin Mountfort was commissioned to design the building, and it was opened in August 1880. As with Mountfort's other contributions to the city, it is an example of Gothic Revival architecture. An extension was added in 1908. This extended the building south towards Armagh Street, and used many of the same design motifs as the original building.

For much of its life the building functioned as the magistrates' court (later the district court). When the new law court complex was built just to the north in the 1980s, the district court functions were moved there, and the building instead became the Family Court. It remained in that role until 2017 when the Christchurch law courts moved to their new home at the Justice and Emergency Services Precinct. Today it is used as a childcare centre.

The building was strengthened in the 1980s when it was converted to be the Family Court, and survived the 2011 Christchurch earthquake relatively unscathed, with only moderate damage to the chimneys and gable stonework, which was quickly repaired.

== See also ==
- List of oldest buildings in Christchurch
