= St Augustine's Church, Christchurch =

St Augustine's Church
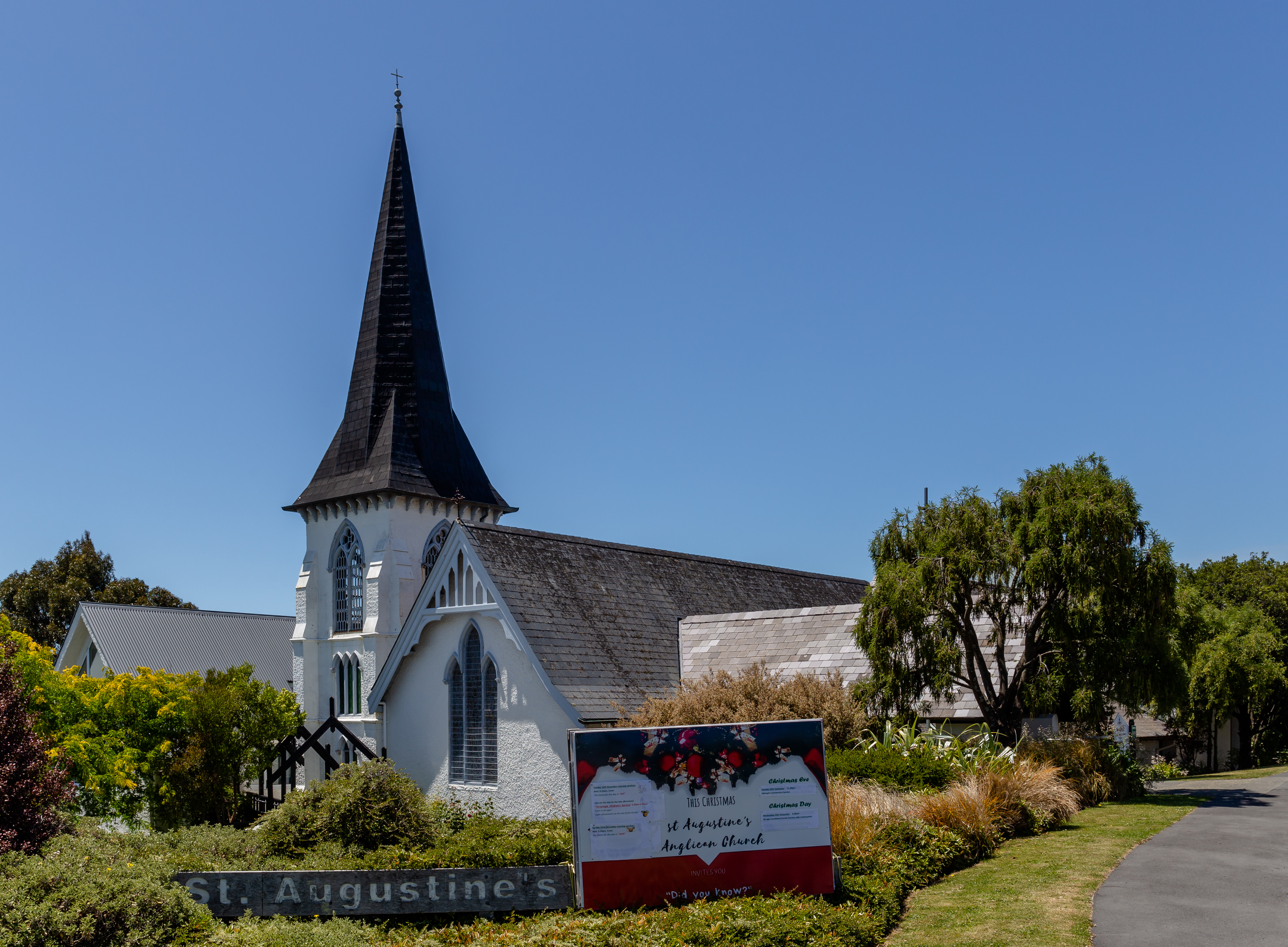
- St Augustine's Church in 2018
- St Augustine's Church
- 43.569924°S 172.633339°E
- Location: 5 Cracroft Terrace, Christchurch
- Country: New Zealand
- Denomination: Anglican

Architecture
- Architect: Collins and Harman
- Style: Gothic Revival
- Years built: 1908

Administration
- Diocese: Diocese of Christchurch

Clergy
- Vicar: Kofe Havea

Heritage New Zealand – Category 2
- Designated: 26 November 1981
- Reference no.: 1924

St Augustine's Church is an Anglican church in Christchurch, New Zealand. It is registered as Category II by Heritage New Zealand.

== History ==
Collins and Harman designed St Augustine's Church. The church opened in 1908 and the service was led by Bishop Julius. A bell tower and spire were added in 1914. Between 1954 and 1999 three more additions were made to the church.
