= Pegasus Press Building =

Oldest building in Christchurch, New Zealand

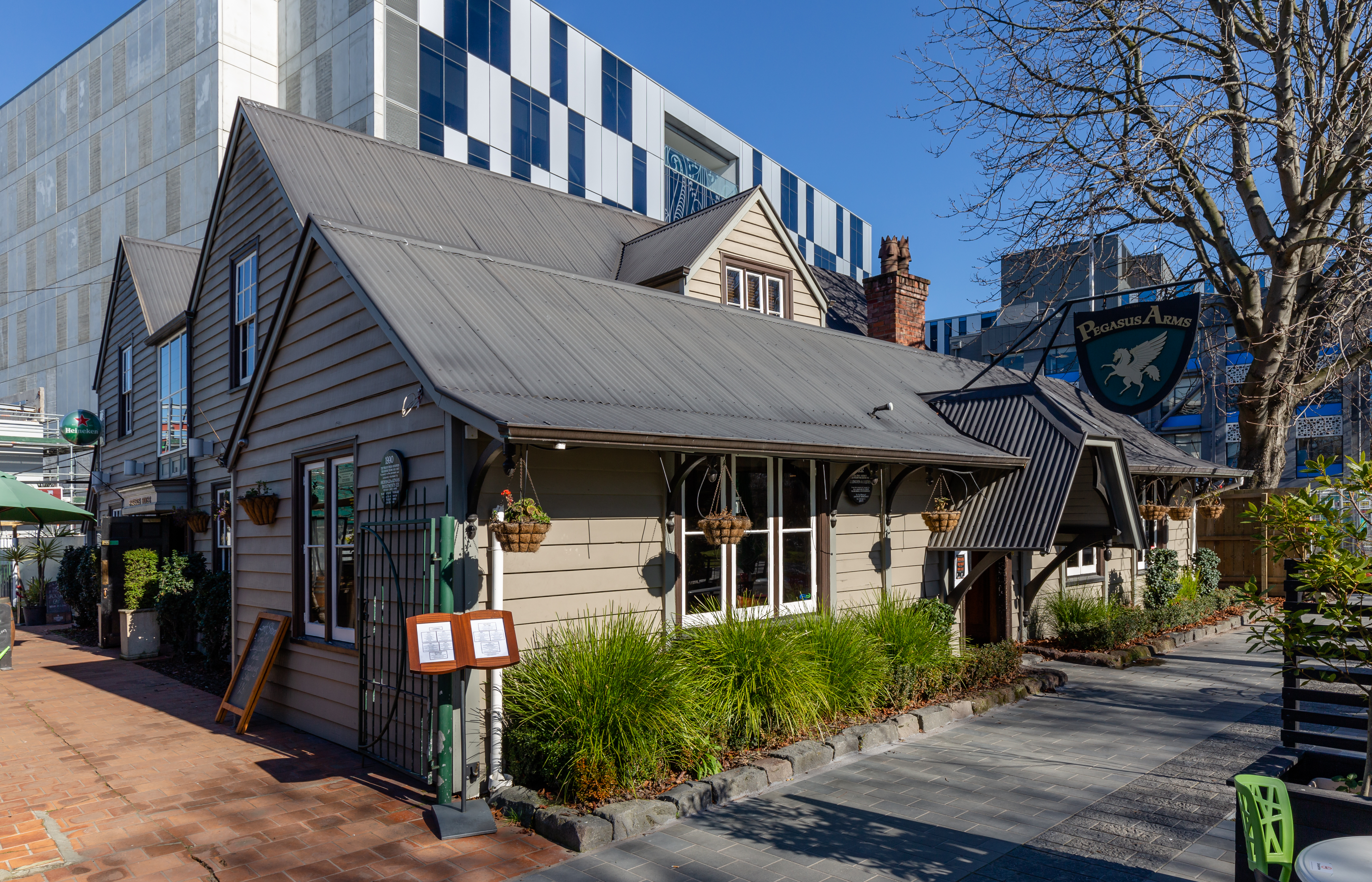
- Pegasus Press Building (now the Pegasus Arms pub) in 2019.
- Interactive map of the Pegasus Press Building area

General information
- Type: Former residential
- Location: Christchurch Central City, 14 Oxford Terrace, Christchurch, New Zealand
- Coordinates: 43°32′5.16″S 172°37′42.39″E
- Construction started: 1852

Technical details
- Floor count: two

Design and construction
- Architect: William Fitzjohn Crisp (partial)

Heritage New Zealand – Category 2
- Reference no.: 1912

The Pegasus Press Building, better known as Pegasus Arms, is a registered heritage building in the Christchurch Central City. It is believed to be the oldest surviving building in Christchurch.

== History ==
The building was first constructed in 1852 by early Lyttelton merchants Joseph Longden and Henry LeCren. In 1853 it was sold to Dr Burrell Parkerson who went on to be the first Surgeon General at Christchurch Hospital. In 1857 it was sold to the coroner, Dr Fisher. The first meeting of the newly-formed Canterbury Medical Association was held at the house in 1865, as it had become a very well-established medical house due to being owned by a series of doctors. It was again sold in 1866 to Dr Coward, who commissioned William Fitzjohn Crisp to design the second-story extension at the back of property in 1869.

In 1952 the building was sold to the Pegasus Press to be used as a printing house, with a dedicated printery added at the rear of the building in 1966. After the press closed in 1987, the building was relocated slightly westward and extended. It was listed as a Category II heritage building in 1987 in response to the sale, and the New Zealand Historic Places Trust (later Heritage New Zealand) strongly objected to the renovations that occurred. It reopened in 1990 as the Pegasus Arms pub.

The building survived the 2011 Christchurch earthquake, and is generally considered the oldest surviving building in central Christchurch.

== Gallery ==
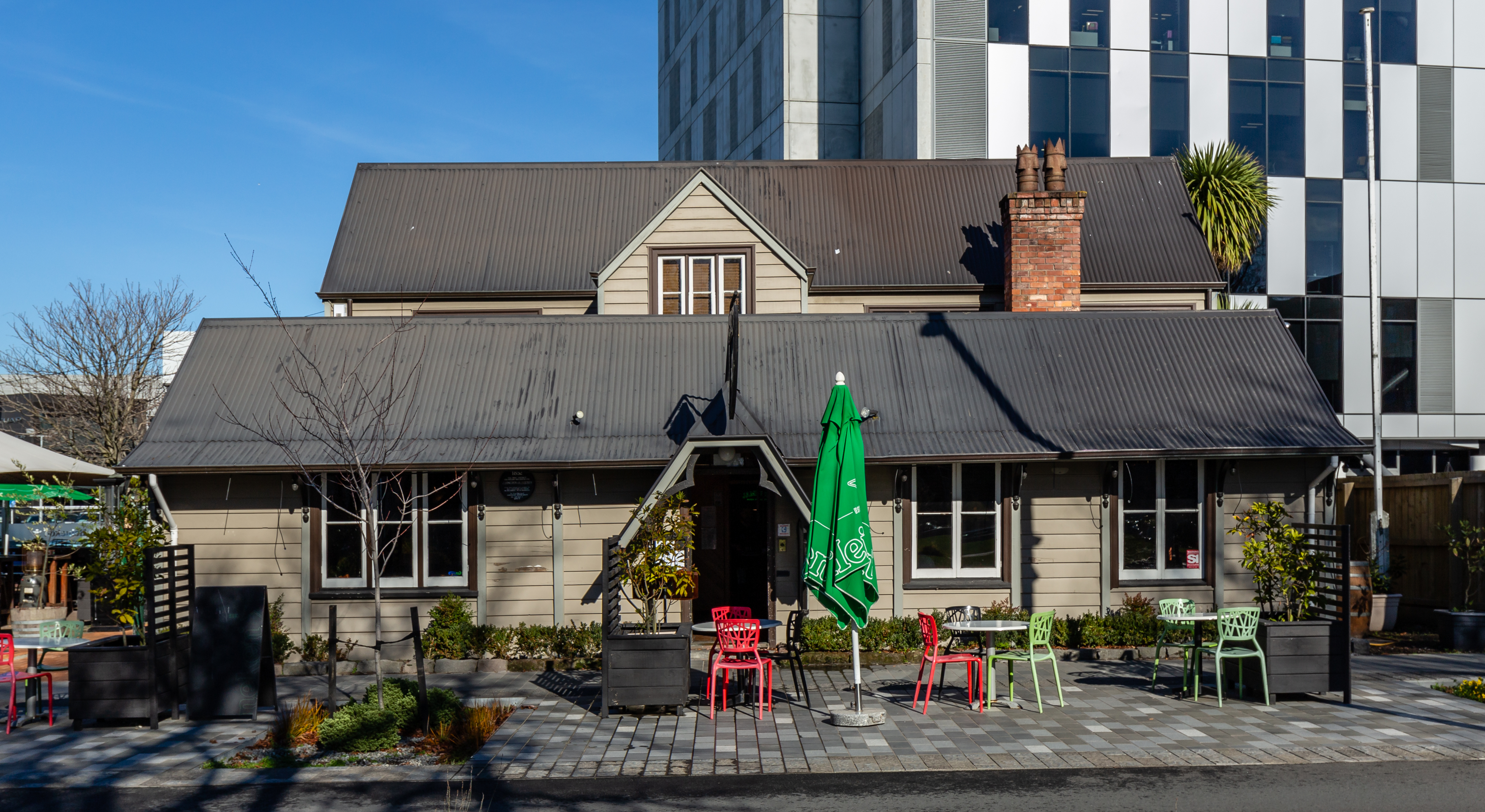
Frontage of the building viewed at street-level.

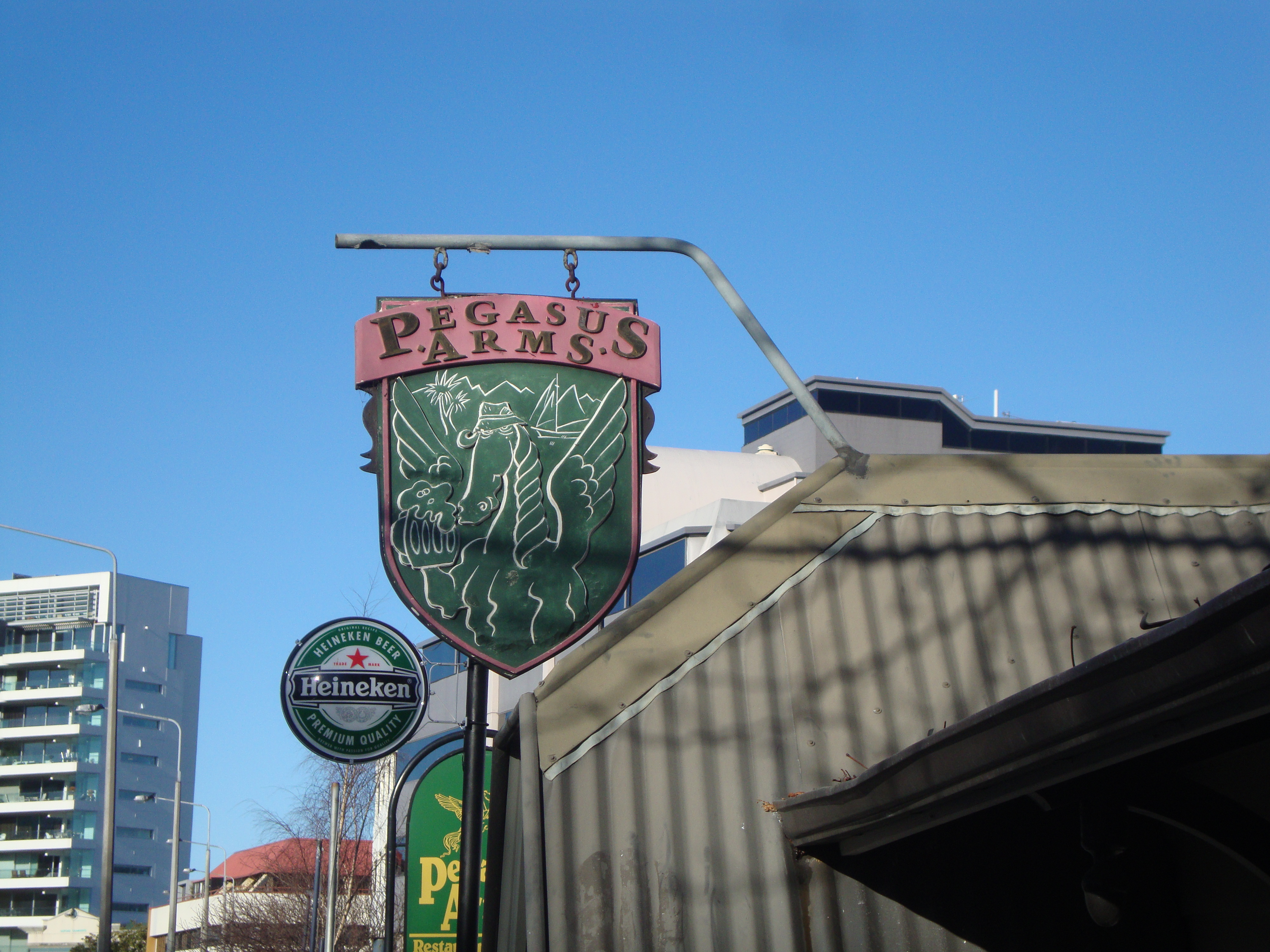
The hanging swing sign of the Pegasus Arms pub, current tenant since 1990.

== See also ==
- List of oldest buildings in Christchurch
