= Antigua Boat Sheds =

Historic buildings in New Zealand

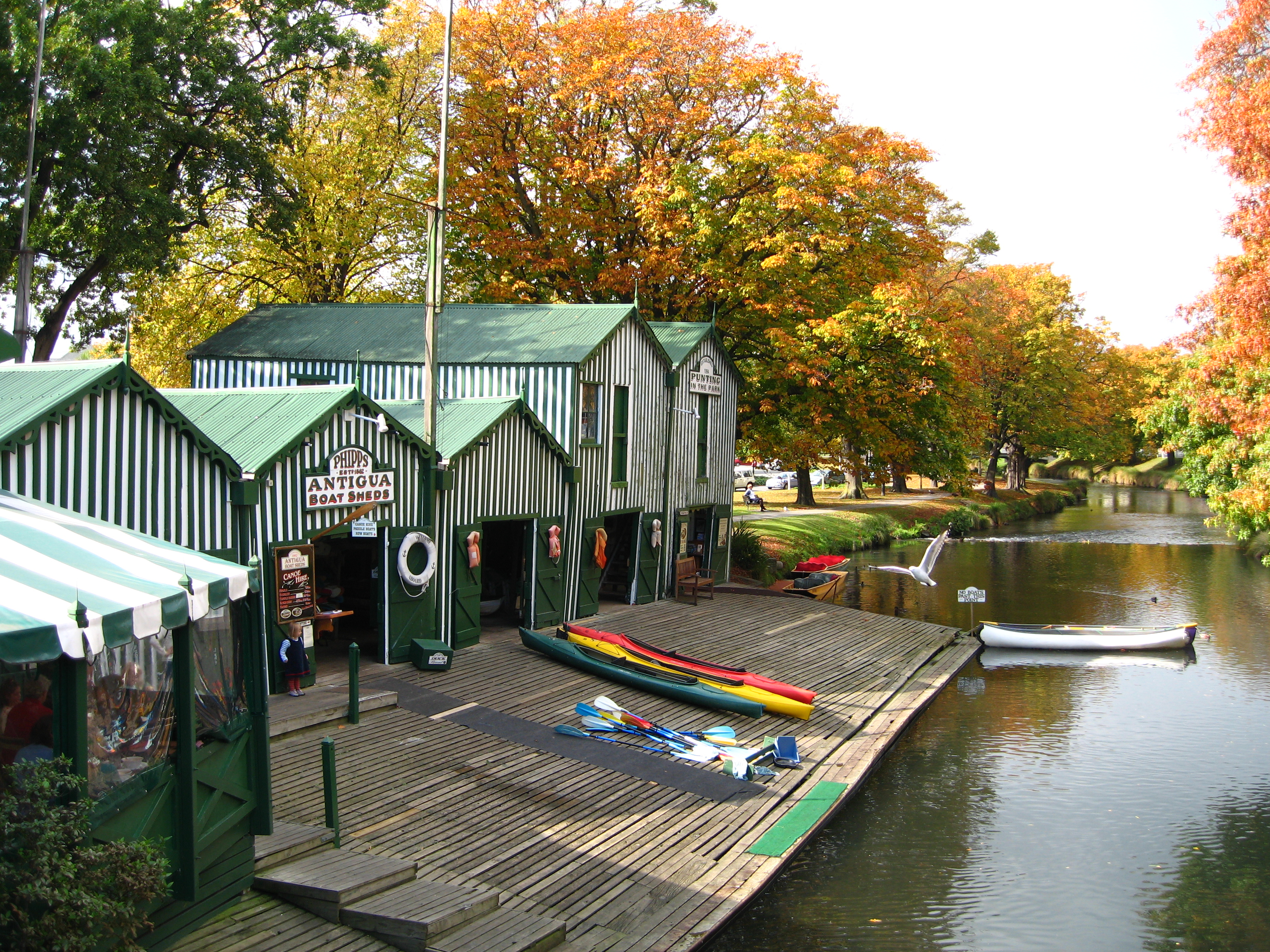
- Interactive map of the Antigua Boat Sheds area

General information
- Location: 43.533831°S 172.627995°E, 2 Cambridge Terrace, Christchurch, New Zealand
- Construction started: 1882
- Completed: 1883

Design and construction
- Architects: Albert Shaw and J T Tidd

Heritage New Zealand – Category 1
- Designated: 10 September 2004
- Reference no.: 1825

The Antigua Boat Sheds in Christchurch, New Zealand is an historic building on the banks of the Avon River. It is possibly the only 19th-century example of a commercial boat shed situated on a river in New Zealand. It has been used as a boat shed continuously since its completion in 1882.

== Geography ==
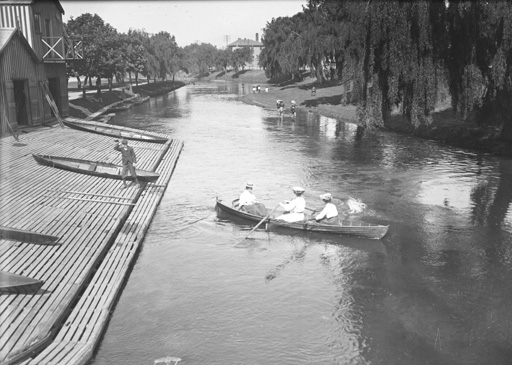
The Antigua Boat Sheds in 1906

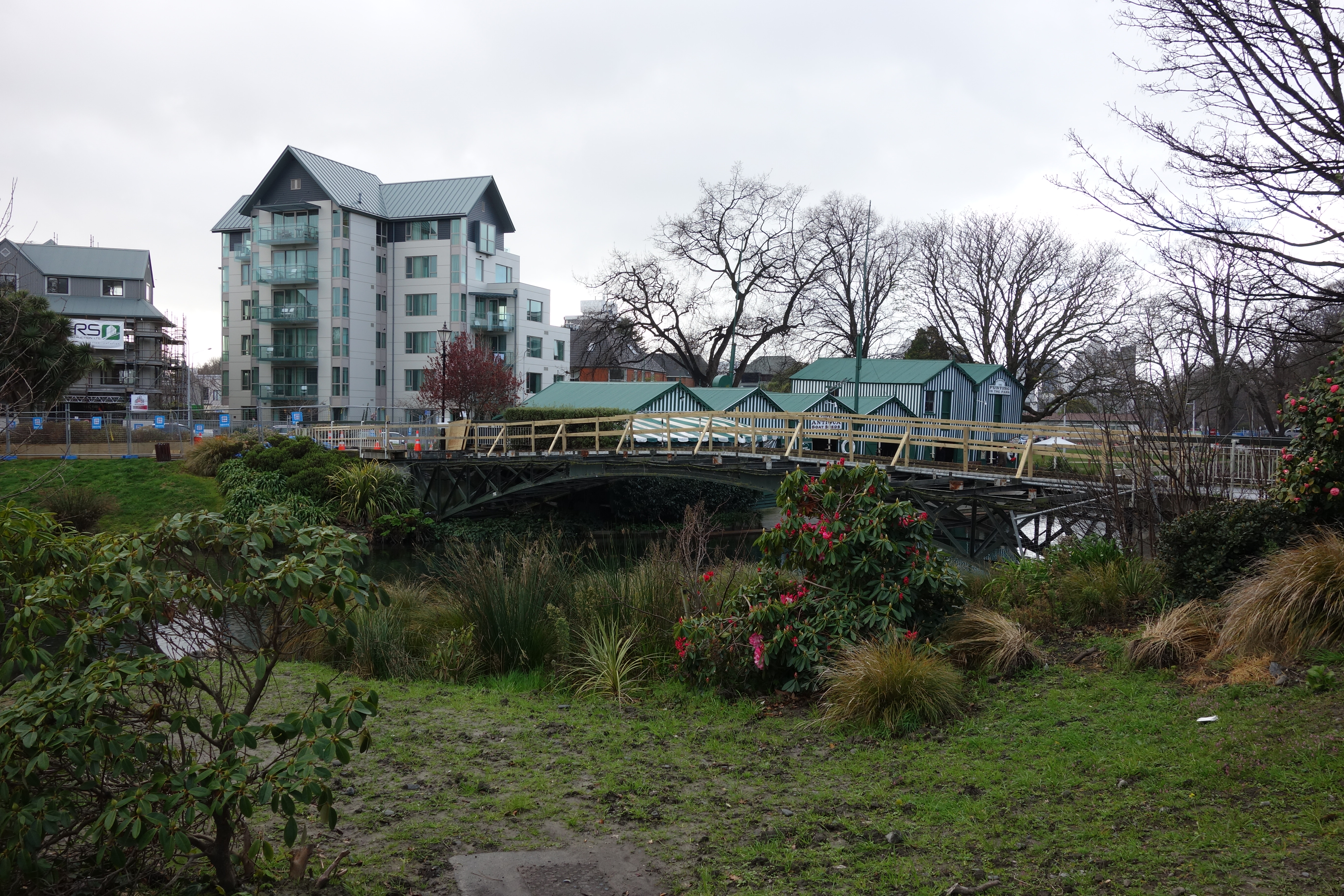
Antigua Street Bridge under construction (with the boat sheds in the background)

The sheds are named after Antigua Street and the Antigua Bridge, which is today the northern terminus of Antigua Street; although until 1904, Antigua Street extended as far north as Armagh Street. The boat sheds are right next to the northern end of the Antigua Bridge and opposite Christchurch Hospital.

== History ==
The sheds were built between 1882 and 1883 by two Lyttelton boat builders Albert Shaw and J.T. Tidd. They launched their first boat on 28 July 1882. Albert Shaw bought out Tidd in 1887. In 1896 Shaw partnered with Samuel Anstey. Anstey introduced photographic services from within the boat sheds. On 14 May 1907 a fire destroyed half of the Antigua Boat Sheds along with around half the boats. The eastern end was replaced by a new two-storey section. In 1920, Albert's son, William Shaw took over the business. In 1930 Mr Bennett bought the business which he ran until Mr Bill Dini took over in 1948. The business was taken over by Maurice and Diane Phipps in 1978. In 1986, they sold the business to their daughter and son-in-law, Mike and Sally Jones, and later they sold them the building, too. As of 2017, the Jones' are still the proprietors of the business.

The building survived the 2010 and 2011 Christchurch earthquakes due to recent renovation and strengthening work.

=== Heritage registration ===
The building was classified as a "Category II" historic place by Heritage New Zealand on 10 September 2004 with registration number 1825. It was upgraded to "Category I" on 19 February 2010.

== See also ==
- List of oldest buildings in Christchurch
