= St Elmo Courts =

Demolished high-rise building

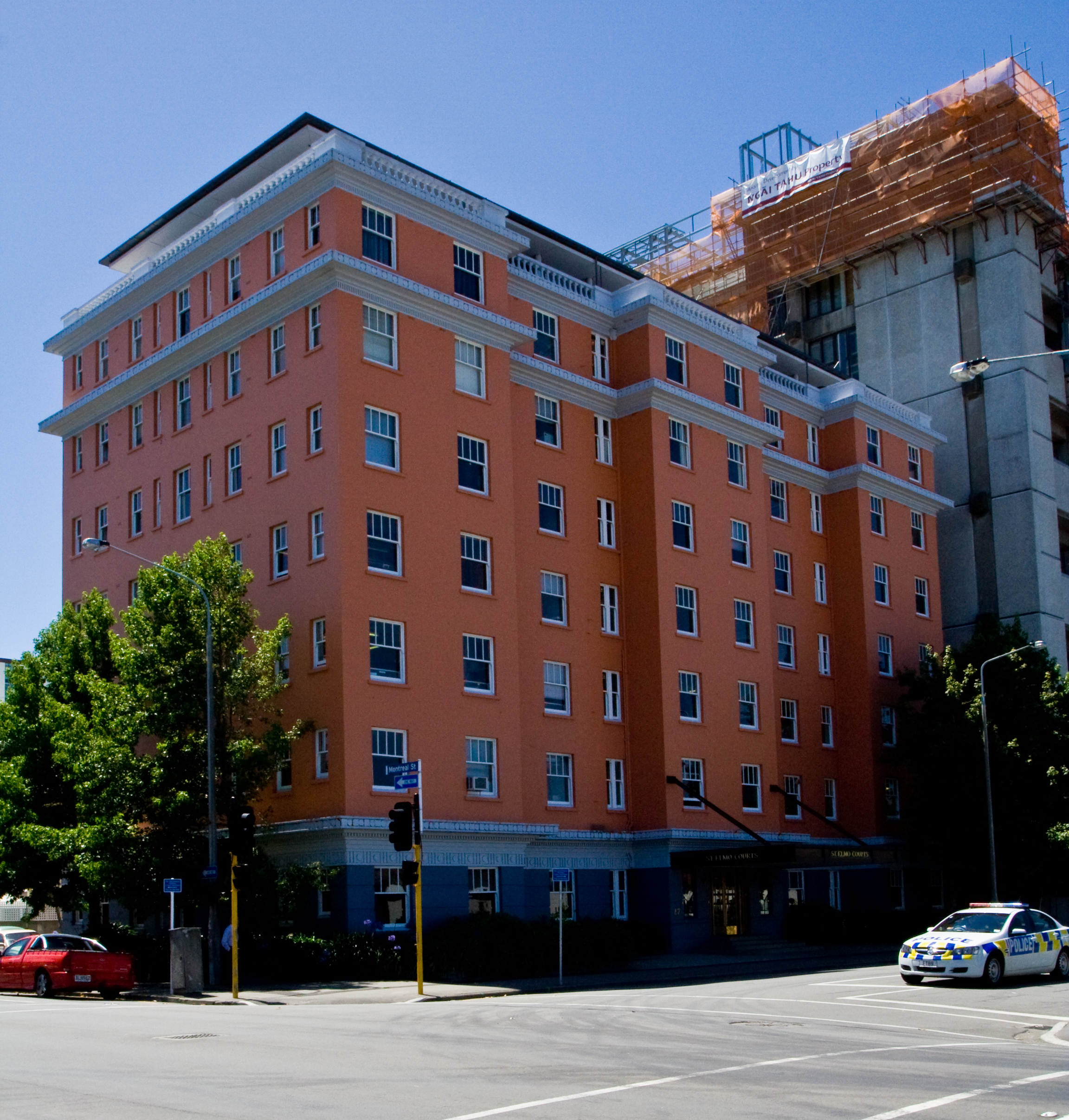
- St Elmo Courts in January 2010

General information
- Type: Apartments in high-rise, mostly converted to offices
- Location: Corner Hereford and Montreal Streets, Christchurch Central City, 47 Hereford Street; Christchurch
- Coordinates: 43.5319°S 172.6310°E
- Construction started: 1930
- Inaugurated: 1930
- Demolished: March 2011

Technical details
- Floor count: 8

Design and construction
- Architect: B. J. Ager

Heritage New Zealand – Category 2
- Designated: 26-Nov-1981
- Reference no.: 3133

References
- "St Elmo Courts". New Zealand Heritage List/Rārangi Kōrero. Heritage New Zealand.

St Elmo Courts was a residential high-rise building constructed in 1930 in the city centre of Christchurch, New Zealand. Used mainly as an office building in later years, it had a Category II heritage listing by the New Zealand Historic Places Trust. It was demolished in March 2011, having suffered significant damage in the 2010 Canterbury earthquake and more damage in the subsequent February 2011 Christchurch earthquake.

== History ==
The site of the building, on the corner of Hereford and Montreal Streets, was occupied by the St Elmo Boarding House. It was advertised as "superior private accommodation". A replacement building, St Elmo Courts, was designed in 1929 by B. J. Ager. This reflected a movement in the larger New Zealand cities in the 1920s and 1930s for apartment living. The appeals were inexpensive living in a central location, with apartments offering modern conveniences and built in furniture. St Elmo Courts was constructed in 1930. Accordingly, St Elmo Court provided bedsits and two-bedroom apartments. Many of those were later converted to office space.

After the 2010 Canterbury earthquake, the building was yellow-stickered (meaning restricted access only). The building's owner and his insurance company agreed that it was too damaged after the 22 February 2011 earthquake for it to be saved. Demolition began on 20 March 2011.

== Structural design and failure mechanism ==
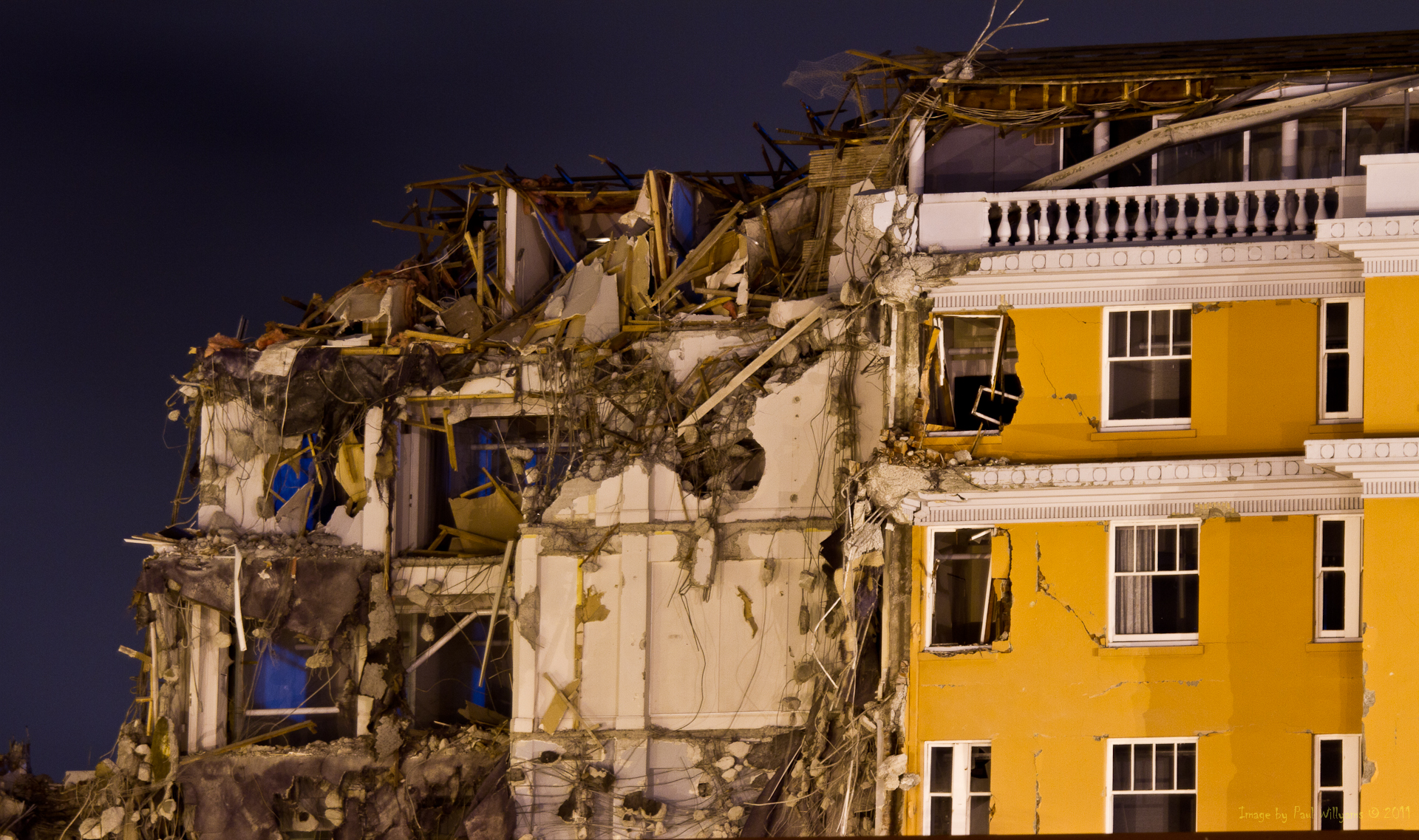
Demolition of St Elmo Courts in March 2011.

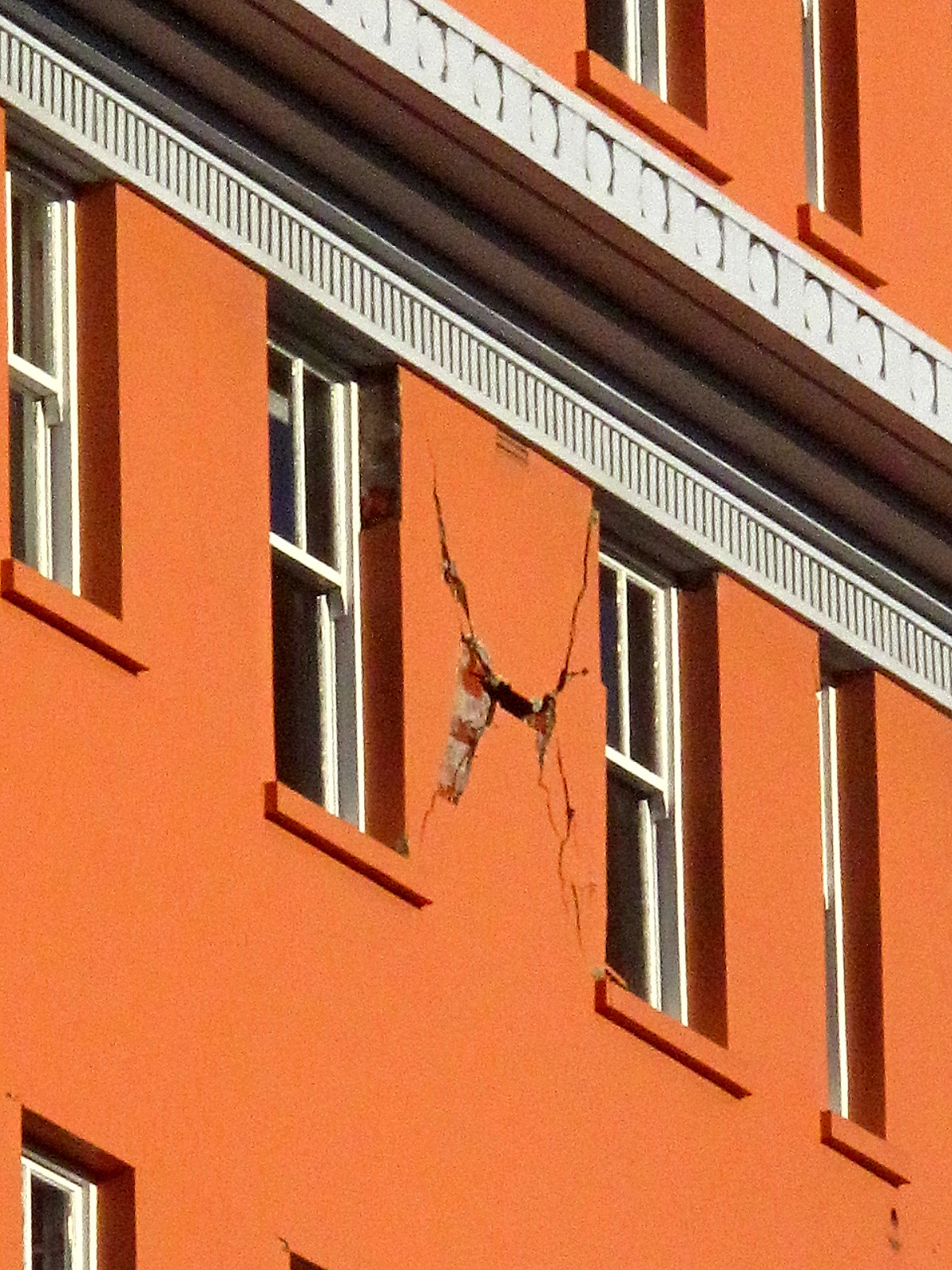
Shear failure detail.

St Elmo Court had a light reinforced concrete frame that was infilled with masonry. Following the 4 September 2010 earthquake, diagonal shear cracks were visible in the façade in the vertical piers. One column had a shear failure. The damage became more extensive in the 22 February 2011 earthquake.

== Rebuild ==
A modern, 5-storey replacement has been constructed on the Hereford Street site. The new building is to 180% of the new building code, and features base isolators. Law firm Wynn Williams has taken naming rights and the building is now called Wynn Williams House.

== Heritage listing ==
On 26 November 1981, the building was registered by the New Zealand Historic Places Trust as a Category II historic place, with the registration number being 3133.
