= The Press Building, Christchurch =

The Press Building
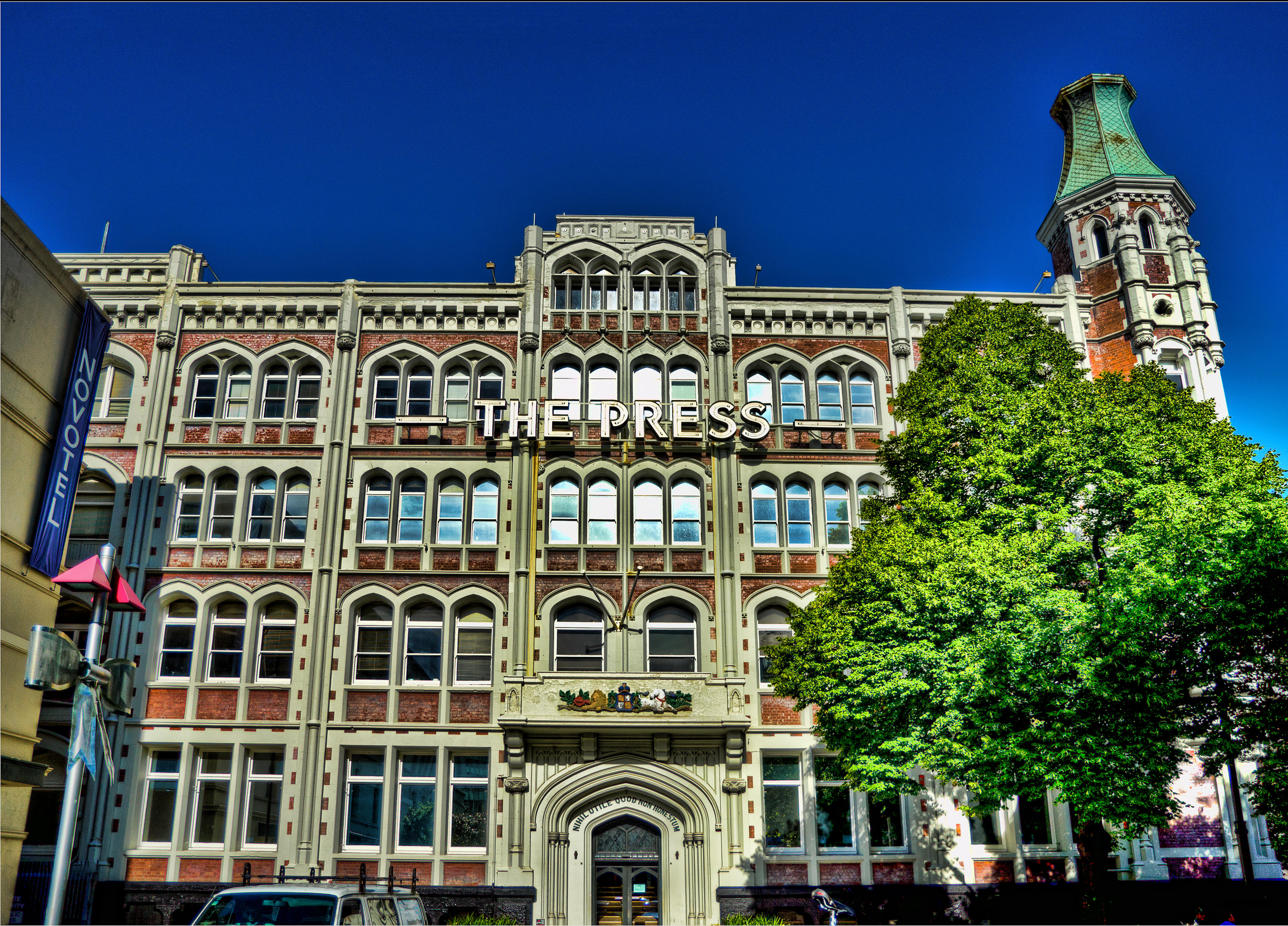
- The Press Building in November 2010
- Interactive map of the The Press Building area

General information
- Type: Office and printing press
- Architectural style: Perpendicular Gothic
- Location: Corner Cathedral Square and Worcester Street, Christchurch Central City, 32 Cathedral Square, Christchurch, New Zealand
- Coordinates: 43.5306°S 172.6381°E
- Construction started: 1907
- Completed: 1909
- Inaugurated: 2 February 1909
- Demolished: 2011
- Client: The Press

Technical details
- Structural system: Reinforced concrete

Design and construction
- Architect: John Goddard Collins
- Architecture firm: Armson, Collins and Harman
- Main contractor: Henry Eli White

Heritage New Zealand – Category 1
- Designated: 2 April 1985
- Reference no.: 302

References
- "Register Record". UC Quakestudies.

The Press Building, located in Cathedral Square in Christchurch, was the home of The Press between 1909 and February 2011. The building, designed in the Perpendicular Gothic style, was registered with the New Zealand Historic Places Trust as a Category I heritage item, with the registration number 302. It suffered significant damage in the February 2011 Christchurch earthquake, with one staff member killed in the collapsed top floor. The building was demolished in July and August of 2011.

== History ==
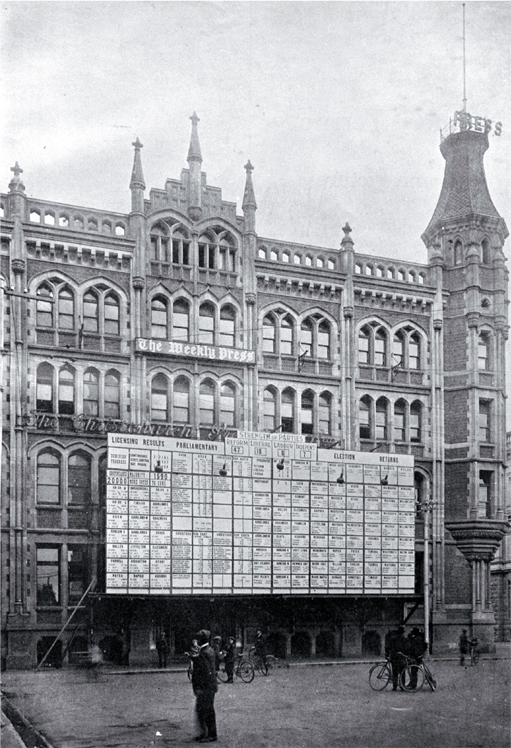
The results of the 1919 general election displayed outside The Press Building

The Press was founded in 1861 by James FitzGerald in order to oppose the politics of his political rival William Sefton Moorhouse. From humble beginnings in a Montreal Street cottage, the newspaper was next located in Cashel Street. George Stead bought the newspaper in 1890, and in 1905 purchased a site in Cathedral Square for a new building in a location that he thought would become the town centre. The firm of Armson, Collins and Harman was engaged to design the building, and John Goddard Collins designed a four-storey building in perpendicular Gothic style. The builder was Henry Eli White.

The building was constructed using reinforced concrete, one of the first in Christchurch to utilise this technique, to support the weight of the printing presses. He allowed for a distinctive tower in the south-west corner. The first edition of The Press produced in the building was published on 2 February 1909. From 1886 to the 1920s, the newspaper used pigeon post for message transfer, and the pigeon house remains on the roof of the building.

The building was sold in 2008 to the Australian company Ganellen. The redevelopment plan was to build a new head office for The Press on an adjacent site in Gloucester Street, and the historic Press Building was to be refurbished as "an A-grade commercial building".

The building was damaged in the 2010 Canterbury earthquake, and the company vacated the building on 8 September 2010. The building was certified for use again. It suffered significant damage in the 22 February 2011 Christchurch earthquake with the top floor collapsing; one employee died, several people were seriously injured and many staff were trapped in the rubble. The earthquake hit two weeks before staff were due to move into the adjacent new office building. The building was demolished in July 2011. All that was remaining by 25 July 2011 was the main entrance door with the newspaper's motto above it ("Nihil utile quod non honestum", which translates to "Nothing is useful that is not honest") and the company's crest above it. Contractors are trying to remove the crest in one piece.

Following the February 2011 earthquake, the staff of The Press worked for 15 months out of a portacom village adjacent to their printing press in Harewood near the airport. They moved into their new building, adjacent to their old site, in May 2012. The first newspaper to be produced in the new premises was the 28 May 2012 edition.

== Heritage listing ==
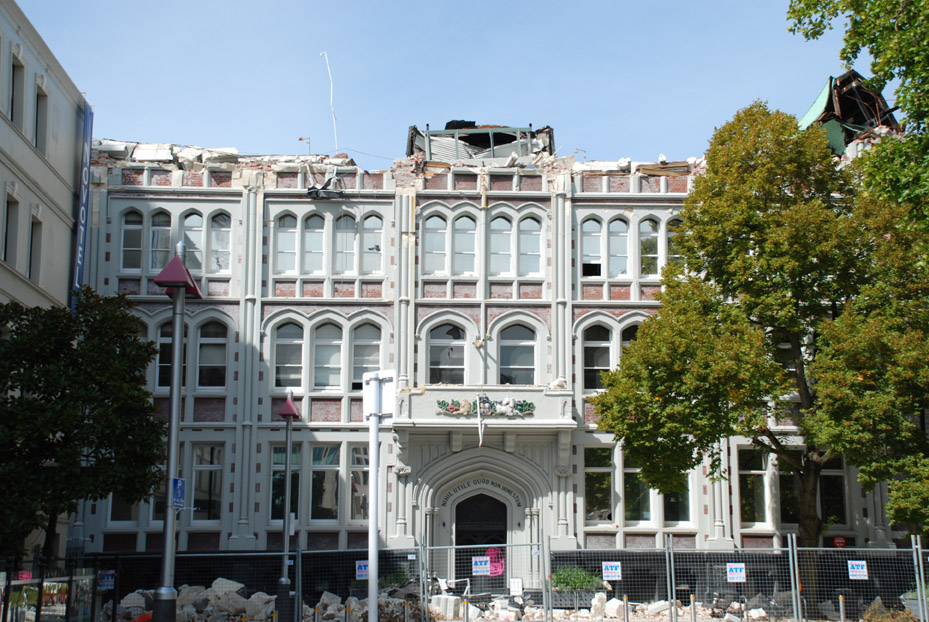
The Press Building showing damage from the February 2011 Christchurch earthquake, with the top floor of the building collapsed

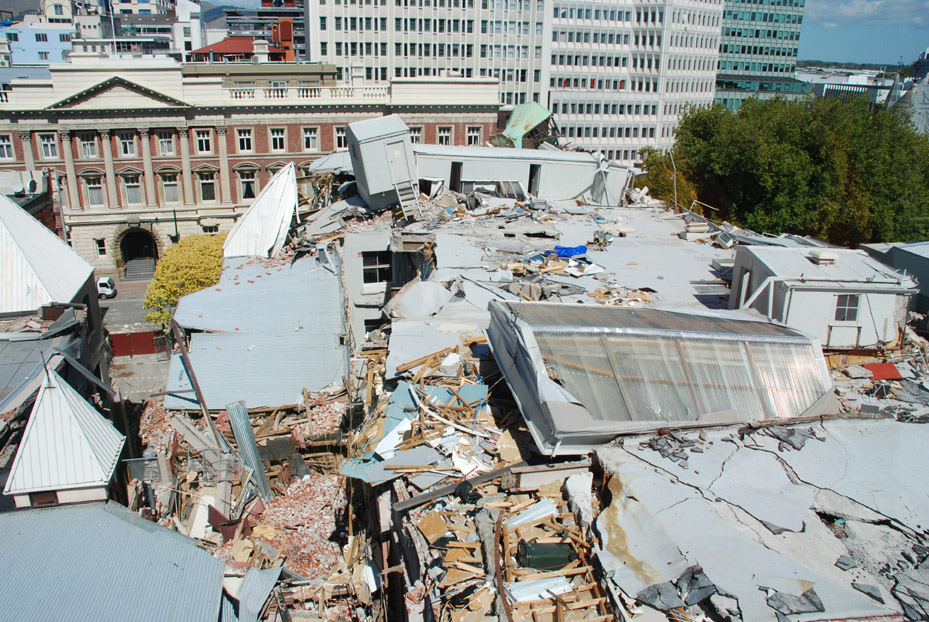
The roof of The Press Building showing the collapsed top floor, as seen from the new Press building

On 2 April 1985, the building was registered by the New Zealand Historic Places Trust as a Category I historic place, with the registration number 302. The Lyttelton Times Building in contemporary Chicago school architectural style is located in the same quadrant of Cathedral Square, and the two façades represent the two different newspaper styles, with The Press being regarded as the more conservative newspaper. The building is a notable example of the firm of Armson, Collins and Harman. The use of reinforced concrete is one of the earliest examples in Christchurch.
