= Armson, Collins and Harman =

Former architectural firm in New Zealand

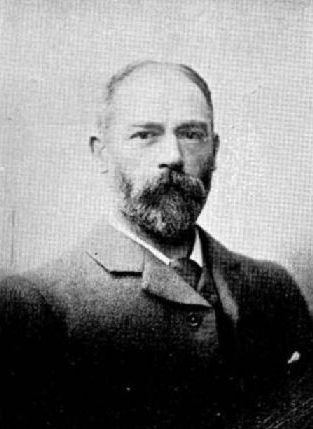
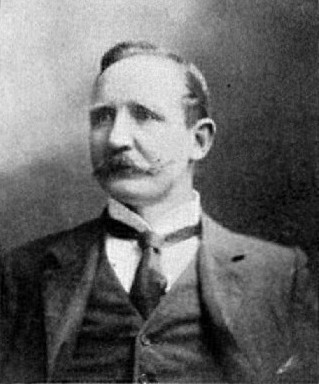
J. J. Collins (left) and R. D. Harman, c. 1903

Armson, Collins and Harman was an architectural firm in New Zealand. It was founded by William Barnett Armson (1832/3–1883), and after his death became the practice of two architects who articled with him, John James Collins (1855–1933) and Richard Dacre Harman (1859–1927).

== History ==
Armson, Collins and Harman was one of the two oldest architectural firms in the country. The practice was founded by Armson in 1870 who was one of the most prolific architects in early Christchurch. Having been articled to Armson as a young architect, J.J. Collins bought the firm after Armson’s death. Four years later, Collins brought Harman (a son of Richard James Strachan Harman) into partnership with him, Harman also having previously articled with Armson. Collins and Harman may have been the first New Zealand-born, educated and trained Christchurch architects.

John Goddard Collins (1886–1973) joined his father’s staff in 1903. In 1928, the firm's name was shortened to Collins and Harman. John Kempthorne Collins (1916–1983), son of J.G. Collins, joined the firm at a later date. Eventually, the name changed to Collins Architects Ltd before closing in 1993.

== Works ==
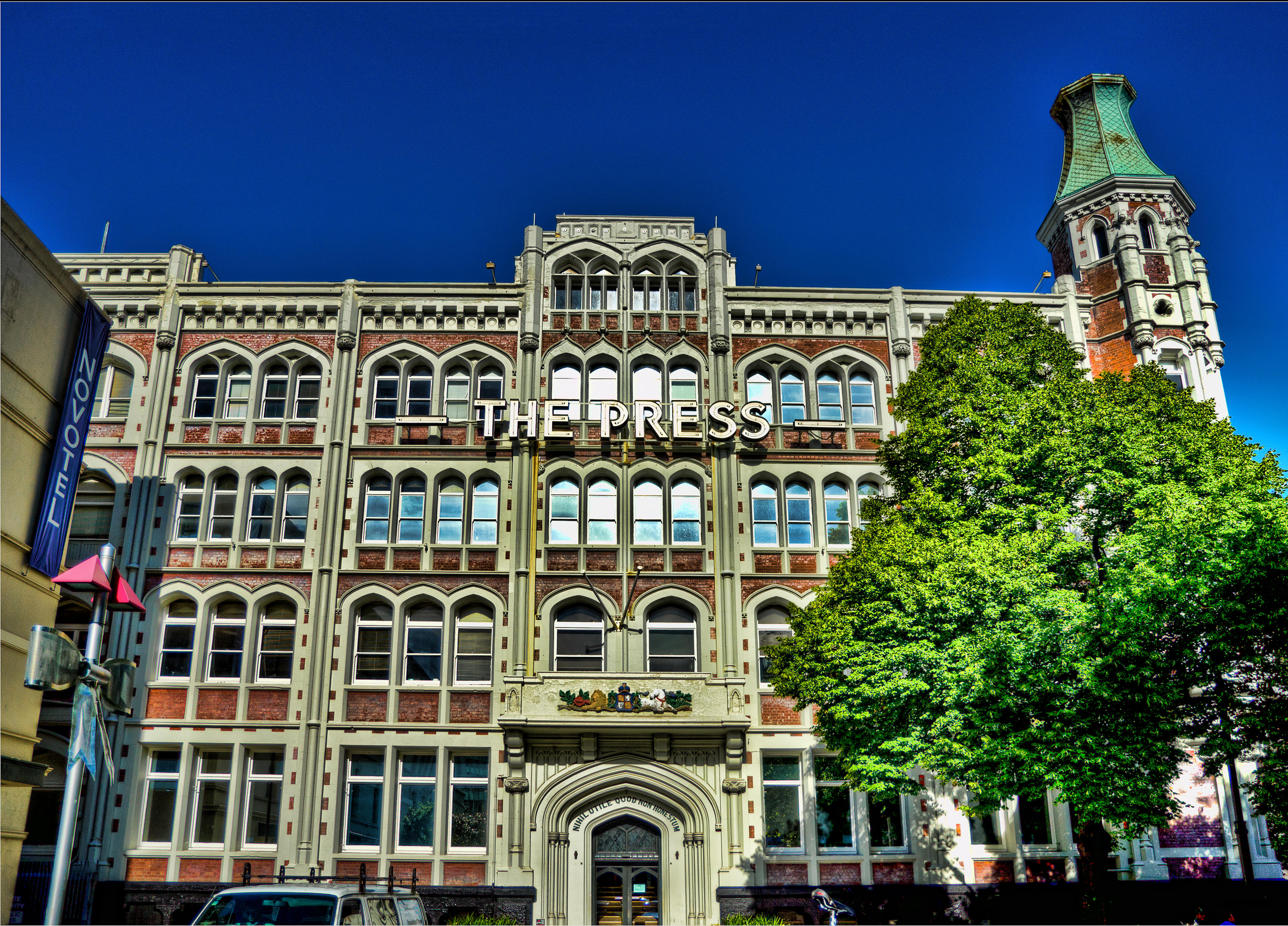
The Press Building, Christchurch (1909)

Many examples of their work were still standing before the 2011 Christchurch earthquake. These include commercial buildings in Timaru, Christchurch, and Lyttelton. The Strange and Co's building on the corner of High and Lichfield Streets, in Christchurch was built for a company that was established in 1863. Others included Christchurch Press Building (1909), Nazareth House (1909), Curator’s House, Botanic Gardens, Rolleston Avenue (1919), the former Canterbury College Students Union (1927), the Nurses Memorial Chapel at Christchurch Public Hospital (1927), and the Sign of the Takahe (1934/36). They also designed private residences such as Blue Cliffs Station Homestead (1889); residence of Arthur Rhodes, Te Koraha ('The Wilderness'), Merivale, where the Duke and Duchess of Cornwall stayed during their Christchurch visit in 1901; residence of G. H. Rhodes, at Claremont, Timaru; residence of R. H. Rhodes at Bluecliffs; residence of G. E. Rhodes at Meadowbank; residence of H. D. Buchanan at Little River; and the Longbeach House, built for John Grigg.

The firm's archives, donated to the Macmillan Brown Library, were added to the UNESCO Memory of the World Aotearoa New Zealand Ngā Mahara o te Ao register in 2018.
