= Birdman =

Birdman or birdmen may refer to:

== Flying ==
- Avian humanoid, a person with avian characteristics in mythology, folklore, and popular fiction
- Birdman, a wingsuit flying parachutist
  - Birdman Rally, a competition where people attempt to fly with home-made contraptions
  - International Birdman, the original Birdman rally

=== Business ===
- Birdman Enterprises, a Canadian aircraft manufacturer from 1973 to 1987
- Birdman Aircraft, an American ultralight manufacturer in the 1970s and early 80s
- Birdman, a brand of wingsuits owned by Jari Kuosma

== Arts and entertainment ==
=== Music ===
- "Birdman", a 1970 song by Ian McDonald and Michael Giles from the album McDonald and Giles
- "Birdmen", a 1982 song by Felt from the album Crumbling the Antiseptic Beauty
- "Birdman", a 1994 song by Ride from the album Carnival of Light
- "The Birdman" (song), a 1994 song by Our Lady Peace
- Birdman (album), a 2002 album by Birdman, then known as Baby
- Birdman (film score), a soundtrack album from the 2014 film
- Birdman Records, an independent music label
- "Jean the Birdman", 1993 music video

=== Film and television ===
- The Bird Men (former name The Birder), a 2013 film starring Fred Willard
- Birdman (film), also called Birdman or (The Unexpected Virtue of Ignorance), a 2014 film by Alejandro González Iñárritu
- Birdperson, a character in the television series Rick and Morty
- Harvey Birdman, a fictional Hanna-Barbera character
  - Birdman and the Galaxy Trio, an American animated TV series (1967–1968) starring Harvey Birdman
  - Harvey Birdman, Attorney at Law, an American adult animated television sitcom

=== Comics and literature ===
- Bird-Man, the alias shared by three villainous Marvel Comics characters
- Birdman, a character in Birdman and Chicken, 1970s British comic strip
- Birdman, a character in Fujiko F. Fujio's manga Perman
- Birdman (novel), a 2000 novel by Mo Hayder
- Birdmen (manga), a 2013 manga series by Yellow Tanabe

== People ==
- Chris Andersen (born 1978), American retired basketball player nicknamed "The Birdman"
- Lincoln Beachey (1887–1915), American pioneering aviator sometimes called the "Master Birdman"
- Birdman (rapper) (born 1969), stage name for American rapper Bryan Williams
- Brett Burton (born 1978), Australian Rules Footballer for the Adelaide Crows
- Tony Hawk (born 1968), American skateboarder nicknamed "The Birdman"
- Albin K. Longren (1882–1950), American aviation pioneer
- Jock Orr (1908-1988), a man known for feeding gulls in Cathedral Square, Christchurch
- Robert Stroud (1890–1963), the "Birdman of Alcatraz", American prisoner and author famous for raising birds
- Koko B. Ware (James Ware, born 1957), American professional wrestler

== Other uses ==
- Birdman, the avian themed dancing warrior from artwork connected to the Southeastern Ceremonial Complex
- Tangata manu (literally "the bird-man"), the winner of a ritual competition on Easter Island

== See also ==
- Bird people (disambiguation)
- Birdman burial, an elaborate elite personage burial from the Mound 72 archaeological site at Cahokia, Illinois, U.S.
- Birdman of the Coorong, a 19th-century Irish-Australian bushranger
- Hawkman (disambiguation)
- Junior Birdmen, a former boys club in the US
- Wingman (disambiguation)
