= Warner's Hotel =

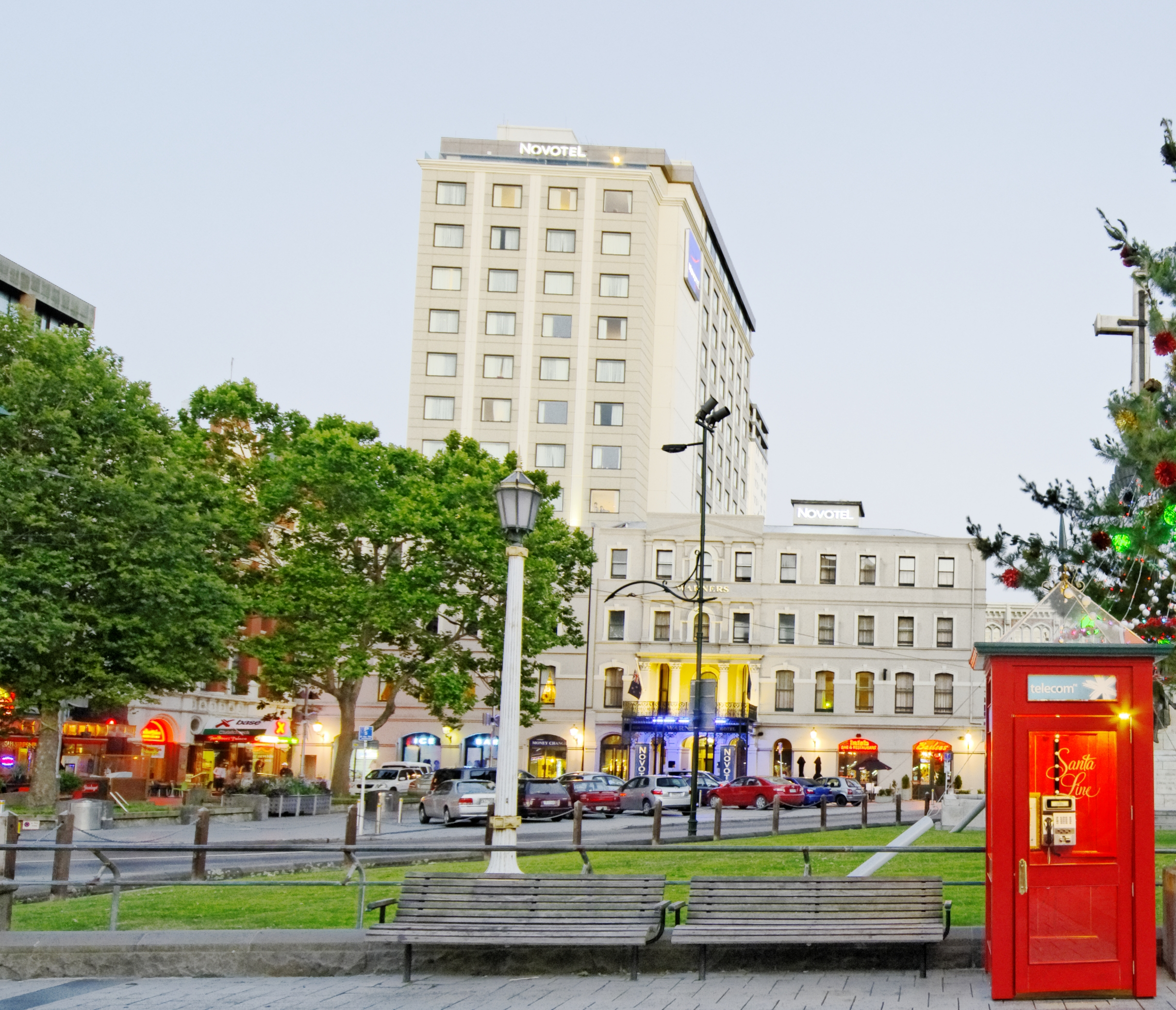
- Warner's Hotel in December 2010 with the Novotel completed

General information
- Type: Hotel
- Architectural style: Victorian Free Classical
- Location: Cathedral Square, Christchurch Central City, 50 Cathedral Square, Christchurch, New Zealand
- Coordinates: 43.5305°S 172.6375°E
- Current tenants: Novotel
- Completed: 29 October 1901
- Renovated: 1910 (fourth storey added)
- Client: Percy Arthur Herman
- Owner: Chrystal Imports
- Landlord: Gordon Chamberlain

Technical details
- Floor count: four

Design and construction
- Architect: Joseph Madison

Renovating team
- Architect: Sidney and Alfred Luttrell

Heritage New Zealand – Category 2
- Designated: 24 April 1997
- Reference no.: 7384

References
- "Warner's Hotel". New Zealand Heritage List/Rārangi Kōrero. Heritage New Zealand.

Warner's Hotel in 50 Cathedral Square, Christchurch, is the site of a hotel established in 1863. The original building, extended on numerous occasions, burned down in 1900. A new building was built in 1901. Again, it underwent numerous alterations. A fourth storey was added in 1910 and the northern end of the building was demolished in 1917 and a theatre built in its place to create a noise buffer to the printing presses of the adjoining Lyttelton Times Building. The theatre was demolished in 1996 and patrons enjoyed a beer garden. In 2010, a high-rise Novotel hotel opened on the site of the beer garden and in the process, the historical and symmetrical 1901 façade was recreated.

Warner's Hotel was recognised as a Category II heritage building by Heritage New Zealand, with registration number 7384. Subsequent to the February 2011 Christchurch earthquake, the historic part of the building was demolished in late 2011. The owner has consent for rebuilding the hotel, but has cited uncertainty over other large projects nearby for the reason of not going ahead yet.

== History ==
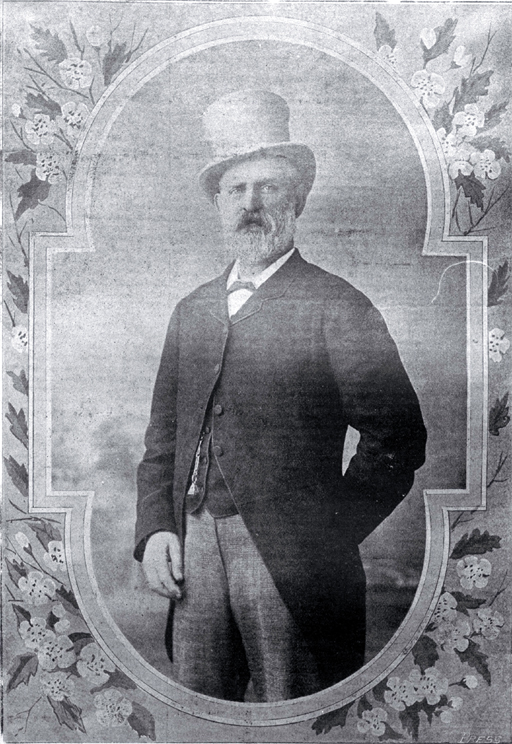
William Francis Warner, an early proprietor of what became known as Warner's Hotel

The Commercial and Dining Rooms were established by John Etherden Coker (1832–1894) in 1863. William Francis Warner (1836–1896) was either the third proprietor from 1874, or the second proprietor from 1873, and the establishment was known as Warner's Hotel from the mid-1870s. Warner, described as "the patriarch among licensed victuallers in Christchurch", drowned in a boating accident on the Avon Heathcote Estuary in 1896. The three resulting funerals were a big event in Christchurch, and Prime Minister Richard Seddon sent flowers to Warner's funeral.

A fire broke out at Warner's Hotel on the evening of 24 April 1900. The wooden portion of the building was destroyed, but the modern part was still habitable. After the fire crews had left, the fire ignited again. The fire threatened at one point to ignite the adjacent original building of the Lyttelton Times, but apart from some windows broken by the intense heat, nothing happened.

The licence for the hotel was transferred to Percy Arthur Herman, an experienced proprietor from the North Island, in March 1901. Herman engaged architect Joseph Maddison to design a new building for the site, who chose a Victorian Free Classical architecture style in the palazzo genre. The façade utilised a grand central entrance with a pediment and balustraded parapets on either side, representing typical use of classical symmetry. The new hotel, with over 120 rooms, was opened on 29 October 1901.

Herman, together with solicitor Walter Cresswell, commissioned architects Sidney and Alfred Luttrell to design what became known as the Royal Exchange, and what is these days known as the Regent Theatre, on the opposite site of Cathedral Square. That building was constructed in 1905. Earlier, in 1902, the Luttrell Brothers had been engaged by the publishers of the Lyttelton Times to design new headquarters on their existing site. The new Lyttelton Times Building was built immediately adjacent to Warner's Hotel and opened in 1904. Initially, Warner's Hotel rented some of the rooms on the upper floors as additional hotel rooms, but this venture folded in 1905, as the printing presses kept the guests awake at night.

Herman engaged the Luttrell Brothers again in 1910 for an expansion of his hotel, and he got them to design another floor. The architectural integrity of the Cathedral Square façade was kept by shifting the entrance pediment up by one floor, and by reinstating the balustraded parapets. In 1917, however, the symmetry of the façade was destroyed by the decision to have the north end of the hotel demolished. In its place, the Liberty Theatre (later known as the Savoy Theatre) was built, and it was to act as a noise buffer between the hotel patrons and the printing presses of the Lyttelton Times, which kept them awake at night. The Savoy Theatre was later registered as a Category II building by the New Zealand Historic Places Trust, but it was demolished in 1993.

In the 1960s, the pediment and the parapets were removed from Warner's Hotel. The gap left by the demolished Savoy developed into a beer garden, and it became a popular place. One regular patron was Green Party co-leader Rod Donald, and after his funeral in the adjacent ChristChurch Cathedral on 10 November 2005, his wake was held in the beer garden.

Warner's Hotel was under the threat of demolition from the 1960s until 2000, when property investor and developer Gordon Chamberlain, director of Crystal Imports, purchased the building from Angus Macfarlane. A 14-storey Novotel hotel was built on the site of the beer garden behind a replica of the hotel's original 1910 façade. The new hotel, designed by CDA Architecture opened in January 2010.

== Heritage listing ==
On 24 April 1997, the building was registered by the New Zealand Historic Places Trust as a Category II historic place, with the registration number 7384. The building was recognised due to its contribution of the street scape in this part of Cathedral Square, being one of the number of heritage buildings in the quadrant. In terms of cultural significance, it was an important meeting place for businesses and community groups. Until the 1900s, it was also a transport terminus.

== Earthquakes ==
Crystal Imports owns five properties in the central city, including the Chief Post Office and Warner's. At least two of those properties are likely to be demolished having suffered significant damage in the February 2011 Christchurch earthquake, including Warner's Hotel. In September 2011, Warner's Hotel became part of the political discussion, with Brendon Burns arguing that it should be retained, after the Canterbury Earthquake Recovery Authority had ordered its demolition and Earthquake Recovery Minister Gerry Brownlee refusing to intervene in heritage demolition decisions. By early November, Warner's had been demolished.

The Novotel hotel reopened on 19 August 2013 after 18 months of repairs. In February 2016, it was reported that Chamberlain had recently been granted resource consent for rebuilding Warner's Hotel. But like many of the neighbouring owners, he was not going ahead at this point in time because of the uncertainty around the large critical projects nearby, i.e. the future of ChristChurch Cathedral, Christchurch and the stalled Convention Centre Precinct in the north-west quadrant of the Square.

== Gallery ==
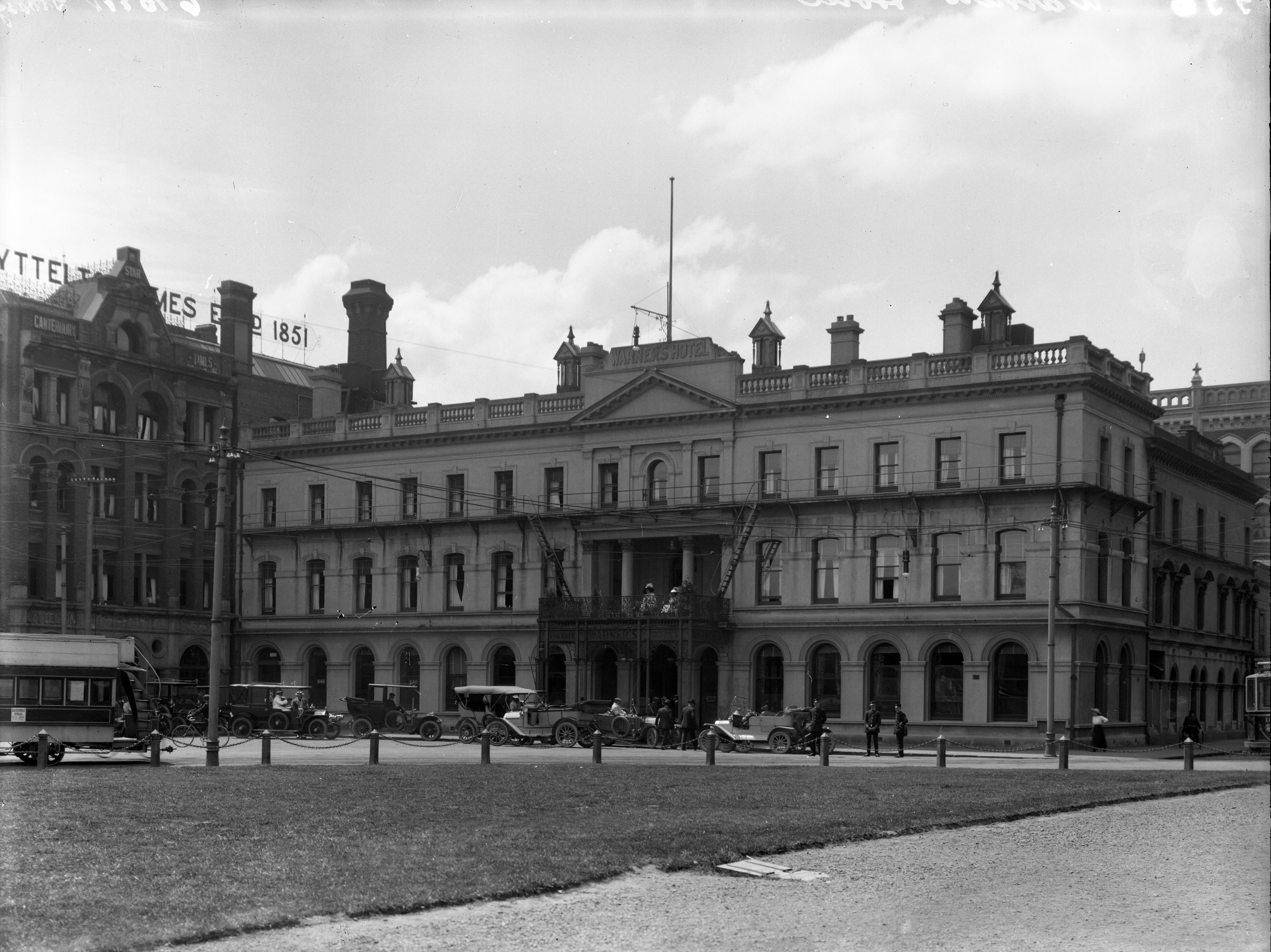
Warner's Hotel between 1904 (completion of the Lyttelton Times Building) and 1910, when another storey was added to the hotel

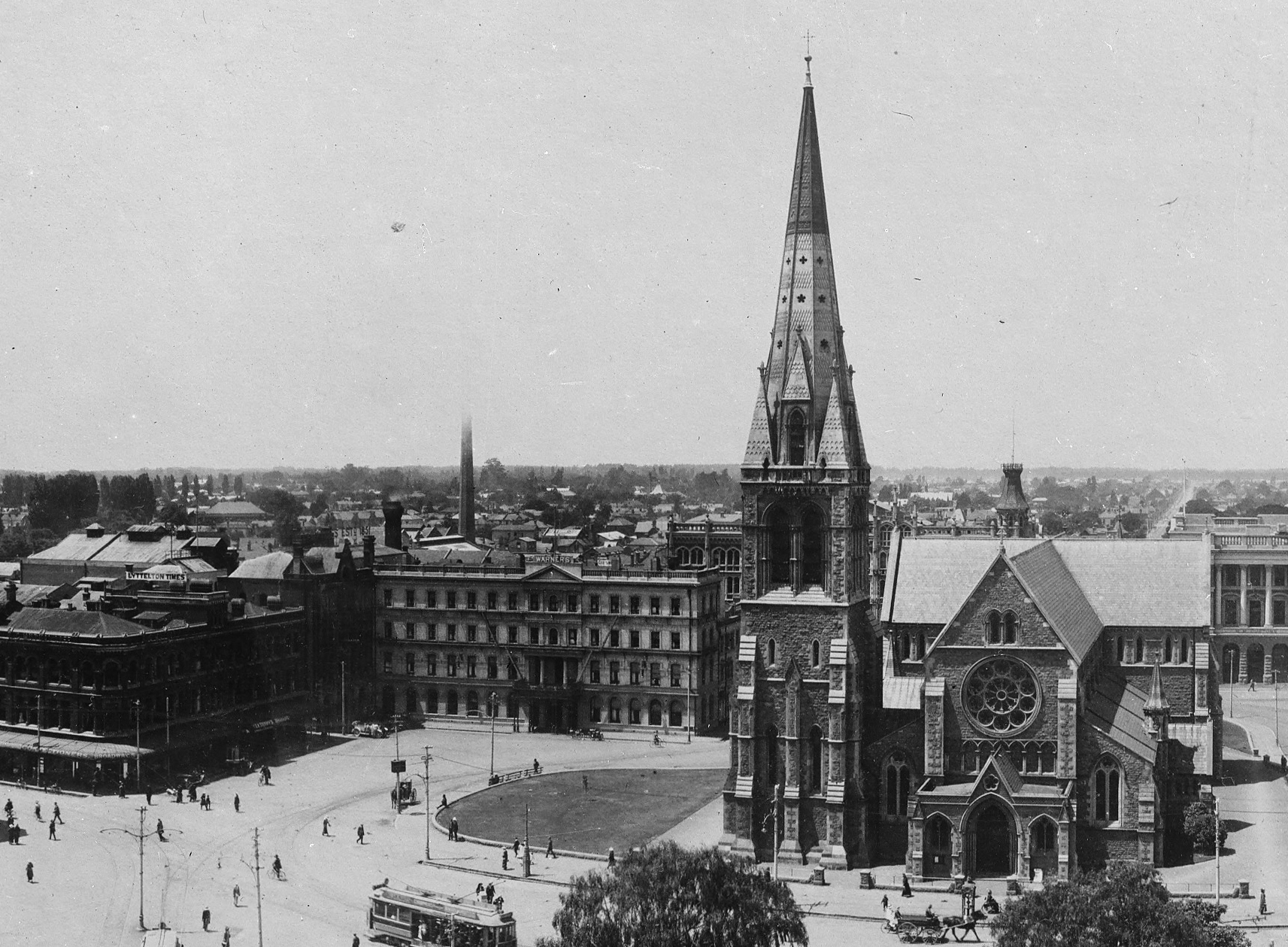
Warner's Hotel with the fourth storey added (built in 1910) and with the façade still symmetrical (until 1917)

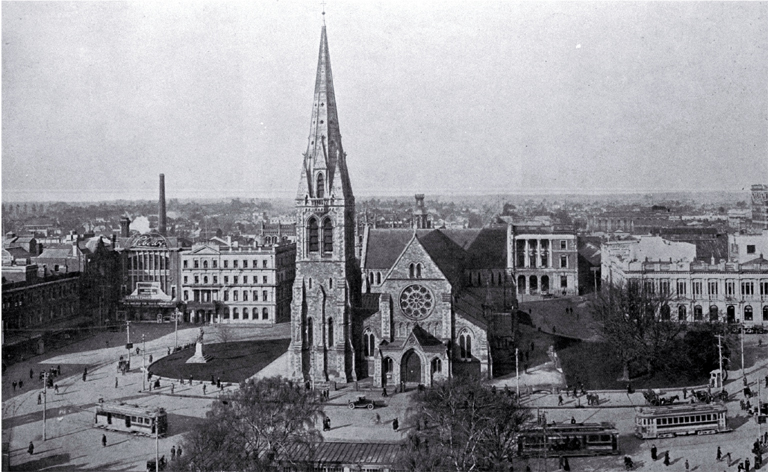
Warner's Hotel in 1926, with the Liberty Theatre built as a buffer to the Lyttelton Times Building

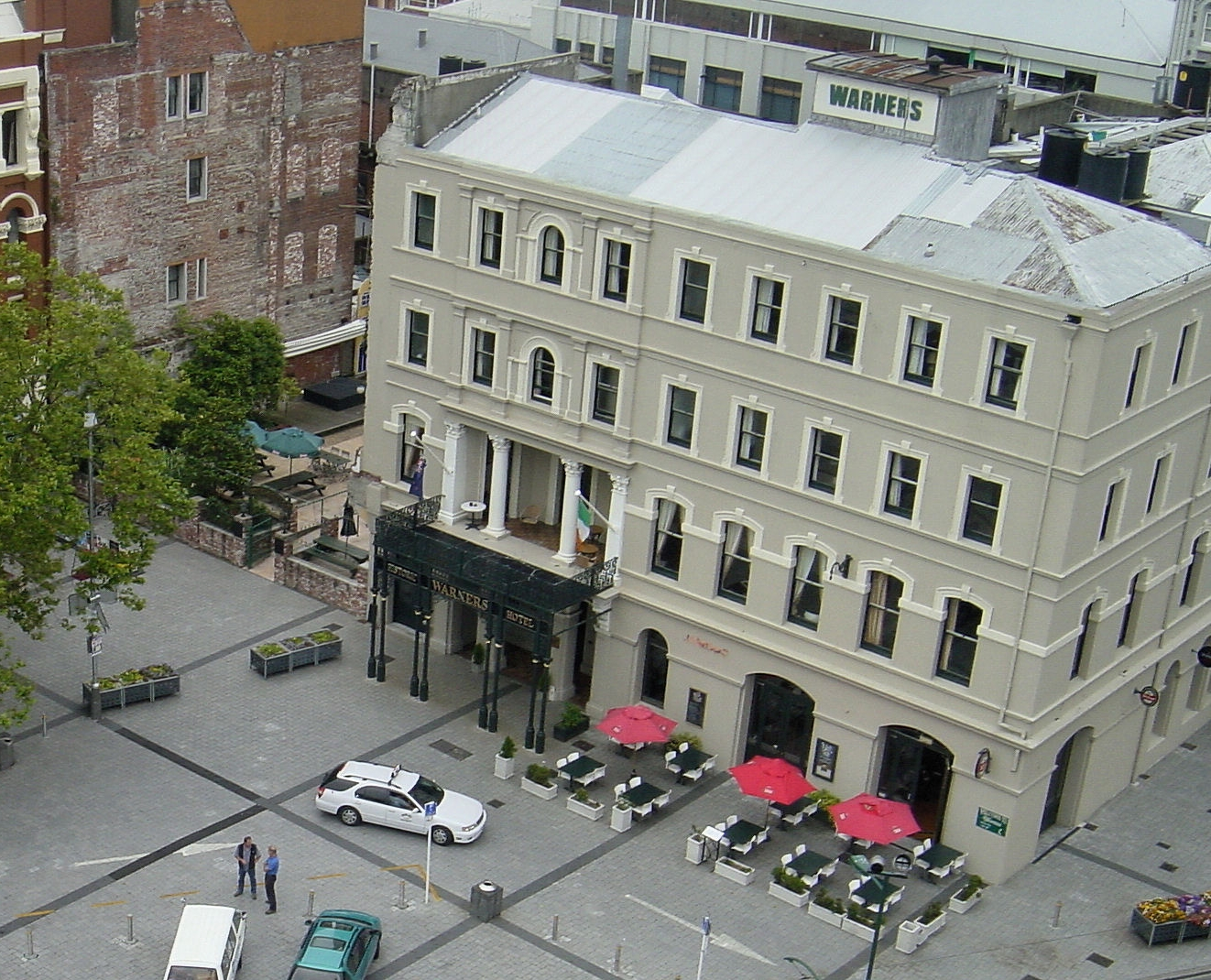
Warner's Hotel in 2007 including the beer garden before construction of the Novotel began

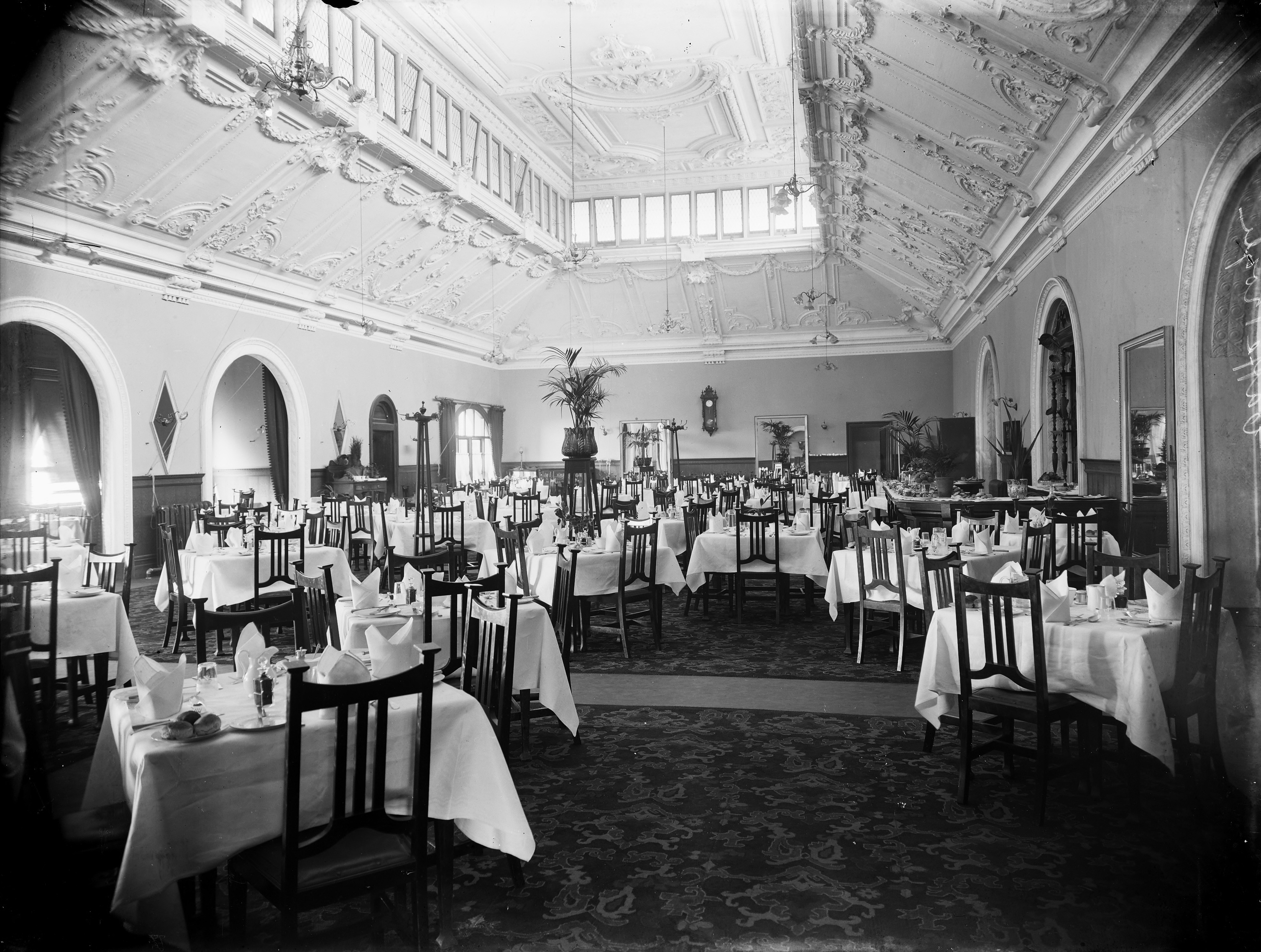
Historic photo of the dining room of Warner's Hotel
