= Bird People =

Bird People may apply to:

- Avian humanoids
- The Crow Nation, known in their language as Absaroka, or the Bird People
- Bird People (film), a 2014 French film
- The Bird People in China, a 1998 Japanese film

== See also ==
- Birdman (disambiguation)
- Hawkman (disambiguation)
- Wingman (disambiguation)
