= Jock Orr =

New Zealand eccentric (1908–1988

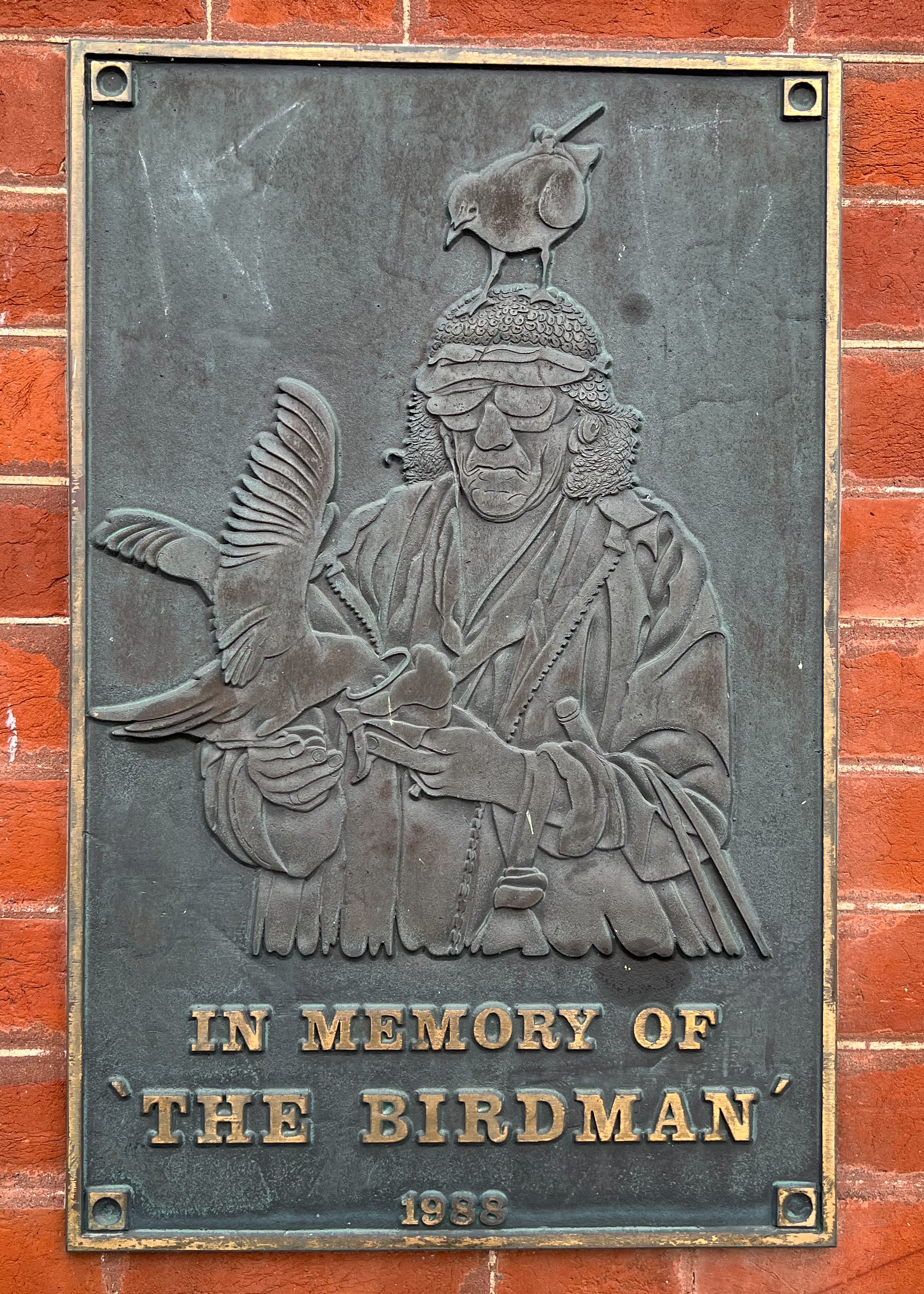
- Memorial plaque for Orr, on the old Chief Post Office, Christchurch
- Born: John Hastings Orr; 7 December 1908; Invercargill, New Zealand
- Died: 15 June 1988 (aged 79); Christchurch, New Zealand
- Years active: 1960s–1980s
- Known for: Eccentric fixture in Cathedral Square

John Hastings "Jock" Orr (7 December 1908 – 15 June 1988), more widely known as the Birdman, was a New Zealand eccentric. He became well known for feeding the birds in Cathedral Square, Christchurch, during the 1970s and 1980s.

== Early life and family ==
Orr was born in Invercargill on 7 December 1908, the son of Thomas Cublick Orr and Daisy Jane Orr (née Mann). He had a troubled upbringing: His mother died when he was less than a year old; he was an inmate of an industrial school—an institution for poor, neglected or delinquent children—by the age of 10; and was sentenced to three years in borstal when he was 16 years old for fraudulently appropriating £7 17s 6d while working as a window cleaner in Gore.

== Birdman ==
By the 1960s, Orr was living in a boarding house in the Christchurch suburb of Beckenham. He had an interest in radios, going as far as to mount a battery-operated television to the handlebars of his bicycle during the 1960s. He was partially sighted, which he attributed to glare from the sun while employed cleaning windows, and from 1972 he lived at the Fernwood Hostel for the Blind in Abberley Park, St Albans.

In later life, Orr was a regular fixture in Cathedral Square, where he became well known as one of the "eccentrics" that spent time there. He would feed the gulls in the square, and they would flock around him, including standing on his head. For this reason, he became something of a tourist attraction. When he noticed that his flock of gulls was declining in 1984, he blamed the disappearance on ultrasonic bird scarers that had been installed on some buildings in the square.

== Death and legacy ==
On 15 July 1988, at the age of 79, Orr died at Princess Margaret Hospital after being taken ill the previous day. He was buried at Avonhead Cemetery.

After Orr's death, the Animal Defenders' League proposed a memorial birdbath be installed in the square to commemorate him. Despite the Christchurch City Council's rejection of the suggestion on the grounds that they did not want a permanent structure to be installed, they did instead commission a bronze memorial plaque. The plaque, which depicts Orr with a gull perched on his head, cost NZ$1,100 and was installed on an exterior wall of the Chief Post Office building on 14 December 1988.
