= Lyttelton Times =

Defunct New Zealand newspaper

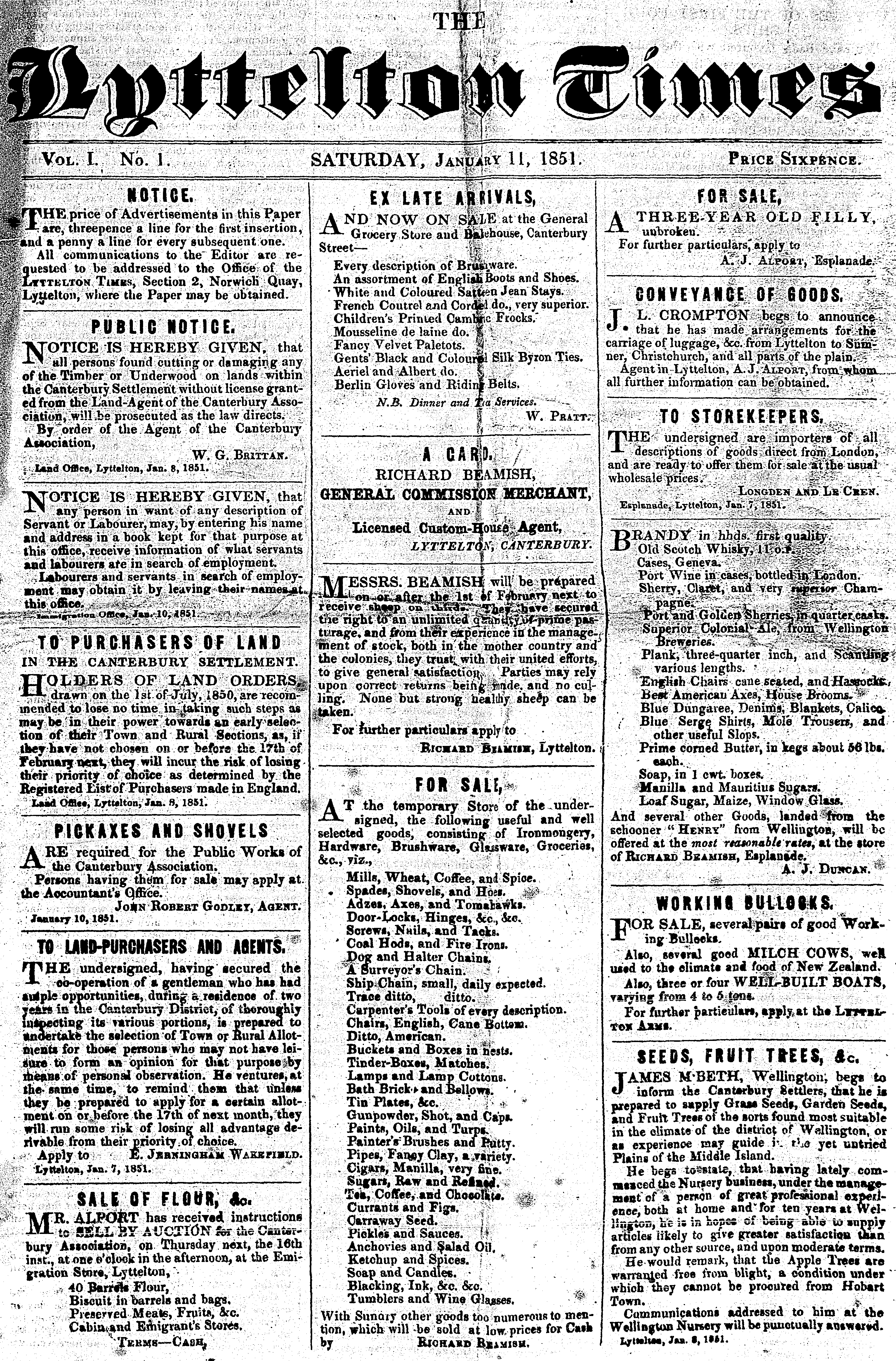
- Cover of the first edition of the Lyttelton Times
- Type: Daily newspaper
- Format: Broadsheet
- Founded: 11 January 1851
- Ceased publication: 29 June 1935
- Headquarters: Lyttelton Times Building, 56 Cathedral Square, Christchurch; New Zealand

The Lyttelton Times was the first newspaper in Canterbury, New Zealand, publishing the first edition in January 1851. It was established by the Canterbury Association as part of its planned settlement of Canterbury and developed into a liberal, at the time sometimes seen as radical, newspaper. A successor paper, The Star, is published as a free bi-weekly newspaper.

James FitzGerald was the newspaper's first editor, and it was FitzGerald who in 1861 set up its main competitor, The Press, over the Lyttelton Times' support for the Lyttelton Rail Tunnel. In 1935, it was The Press that won the competition for the morning newspaper market in Christchurch; the Lyttelton Times was the oldest newspaper in the country when it ceased that year.

== History ==
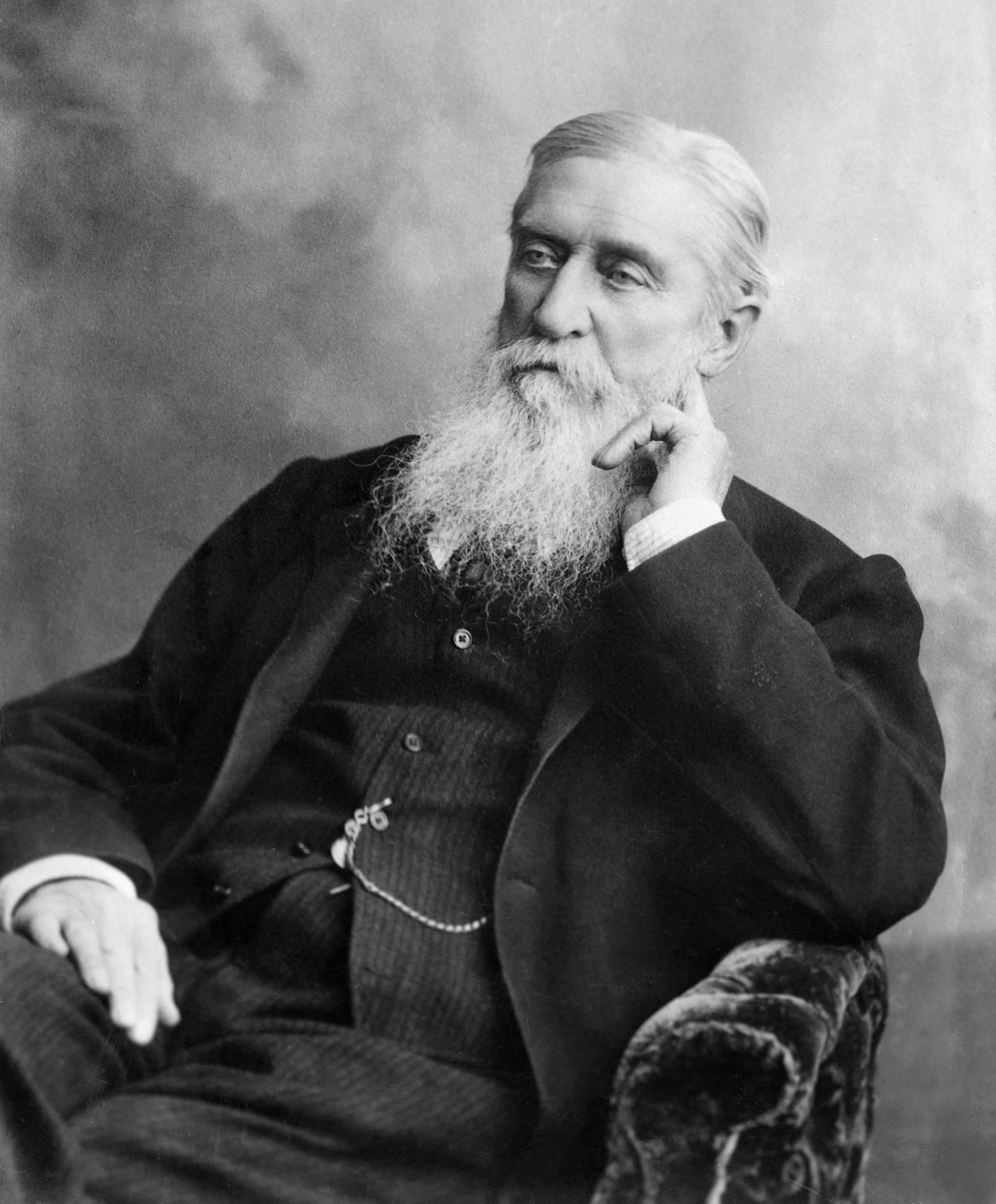
James FitzGerald, the first editor of the Lyttelton Times, and later the founder of its major competitor, The Press.

The Canterbury Association was formed in order to establish a colony in what is now the Canterbury Region in the South Island of New Zealand. Part of the plan was to have a newspaper, and a prospectus was published in August 1850. The Canterbury Association entered into a contract with Ingram Shrimpton, of the Crown Yard Printing Office, Oxford, to send out the necessary plant in one of the First Four Ships to Lyttelton. The printing equipment arrived on the Charlotte Jane on 16 December 1850, and the first edition of the Lyttelton Times was published less than one month later on 11 January 1851.

The press was first installed in a shed on Norwich Quay. John Ingram Shrimpton, Ingram Shrimpton's son, came out on the Charlotte Jane with some staff for the newspaper and was manager and canvasser. James FitzGerald was the first editor for the Lyttelton Times, and had agreed to work for free. One of the early contributors to the newspaper was John Robert Godley.

Ingram Shrimpton came out from England in 1854 and took over as editor. FitzGerald had effectively relinquished the editorship upon his election as Superintendent of the Canterbury Province in July 1853. The production moved to more spacious premises in Lyttelton's Oxford Street in 1854. In July 1856, Shrimpton sold the newspaper to Charles Bowen and Crosbie Ward for £5000. Ward became editor and showed great talent in running the newspaper. When he lost his seat in Parliament in 1866, he could devote himself full-time to journalism and was regarded as Canterbury's best satirical writer.

In 1861 Bowen sold his interest in the business to William Reeves, and William John Warburton Hamilton and Thomas William Maude became minority shareholders.

Due to the growth of Christchurch, the newspaper moved to this bigger market in 1863, but kept its original name. The new location for the newspaper was in Gloucester Street, with the section extending back to Cathedral Square. The buildings were extended several times and in 1884, the Star Building was established at the Gloucester Street frontage and between 1902 and 1904, the final office building, the Lyttelton Times Building, was constructed on the Cathedral Square frontage by Sidney and Alfred Luttrell.

Ward died in November 1867 and Reeves took editorial and managerial control. Later, his son, William Pember Reeves, joined the staff. A lawyer by training, he reported Christchurch Supreme Court cases for the New Zealand Law Reports. His real interest was in politics, though, and he wrote political commentary for the Lyttelton Times before becoming the parliamentary correspondent. He became editor of the Lyttelton Times in 1889, but resigned in 1891 when he became a minister. Reeves senior died shortly after that and it was discovered that he had mismanaged the finances of the newspaper, and the family lost its control of the Lyttelton Times.

== Publishing history ==
The Lyttelton Times started as a weekly newspaper. Beginning on 4 August 1854, the newspaper became bi-weekly. From 1863, the newspaper was published three times a week. After the move to Christchurch, the newspaper became a daily. An illustrated weekly paper, the Canterbury Times, was first published in 1865. The Star, the evening edition of the Lyttelton Times, was added to the portfolio on 14 May 1868.

On 1 August 1929, the name was changed to Christchurch Times. The final issue was published on 29 June 1935. Its demise was brought on by intense competition, with two morning papers and two evening papers being published in Christchurch at that time. The Press, which is still published today, took the morning newspaper market. The Lyttelton Times Company was renamed to New Zealand Newspapers Ltd and published the Star-Sun as an evening paper. The successor of that evening paper, The Star, is still published in Christchurch on Wednesdays and Fridays as a free newspaper.

== Notable news coverage ==
The first edition covered the journey of the First Four Ships, which due to its importance for the history of Christchurch is often quoted.

Starting with issue 8 on 1 March 1851, the Lyttelton Times published the rural sections chosen by land purchasers. Much of the land listed makes up suburban Christchurch. The rural sections (RS) were numbers in the order they were chosen. The table below lists rural sections and notable purchasers. In the 1 March edition, rural sections 1 to 18 were described. This came to an end with issue 17, by which time the first 157 rural land purchases had been reported.

Issue	Date	RS	Notable purchasers
8	1 March	1–18	Felix Wakefield (RS 2); Guise Brittan (RS 5); Henry Sewell (RS 9); John Watts-Russell (RS 12); Lord Wharncliffe (RS 15); Walpole Cheshire Fendall (RS 18)
9	8 March	19–38	Benjamin Mountfort (RS 20); Guise Brittan (RS 26)
10	15 March	39–53	Benjamin Dudley (RS 40); Guise Brittan (RS 41); Alfred Barker (RS 46); G. Draper and James FitzGerald (RS 48)
11	22 March	54–70	Joseph Longden and Henry Le Cren (RS 55); Felix Wakefield (RS 56); Richard James Strachan Harman (RS 58); Guise Brittan (RS 60); Benjamin Lancaster (RS 62); Thomas Rowley Jr. (RS 63); Edward Kent and Isaac Luck (RS 64)
12	29 March	71–104	Rev Charles Martin Torlesse (RS 81 & 86); George Hart (RS 84); Thomas Rowley Sr. (RS 85); Henry Selfe (RS 91); Charles Bowen (RS 94); Edward Bishop and Frederick Augustus Bishop (RS 98)
15	19 April	105–117	Charles Adderley, 1st Baron Norton (RS 115)
16	26 April	118–138	Rev Thomas Jackson (RS 121 & 123)
17	3 May	139–157	Rev Thomas Jackson (RS 141, 146, 156); Lady Olivia Sparrow (RS 147); Richard Packer (RS 148); Edward Dobson (RS 152); Charles Simeon (RS 154)

A topic on everybody's mind was the proposal for the Lyttelton Rail Tunnel. Eventually, it became the first tunnel in the world to be taken through the side of an extinct volcano, and at 2.7 km, the longest in the country. William Sefton Moorhouse became a strong proponent of the tunnel project. During the election campaign of the provincial Superintendent in 1857, the tunnel became the central issue, with Moorhouse’s opponent, Joseph Brittan, being opposed to the idea. Moorhouse received much support for his position from the residents of Lyttelton, as evidenced by the results of the election: of the 12,000 residents of Canterbury, including 3,205 in Christchurch and 1,944 in Lyttelton, both candidates received 206 votes from the residents of Christchurch. However, overall results were a victory for Moorhouse by 727 votes to 352. Moorhouse later began the project by turning the first sod on 17 July 1861. The tunnel project was supported by the Lyttelton Times. FitzGerald, the first editor of the Lyttelton Times until he became the first Superintendent, was vehemently opposed to the tunnel to the extent that he founded The Press in 1861, so that he could give a voice to his opposition.

Crosbie Ward and the Lyttelton Times are credited with the successful campaign for a fast mail service between England and the colony through Panama to be established.
