= Lyttelton Times Building =

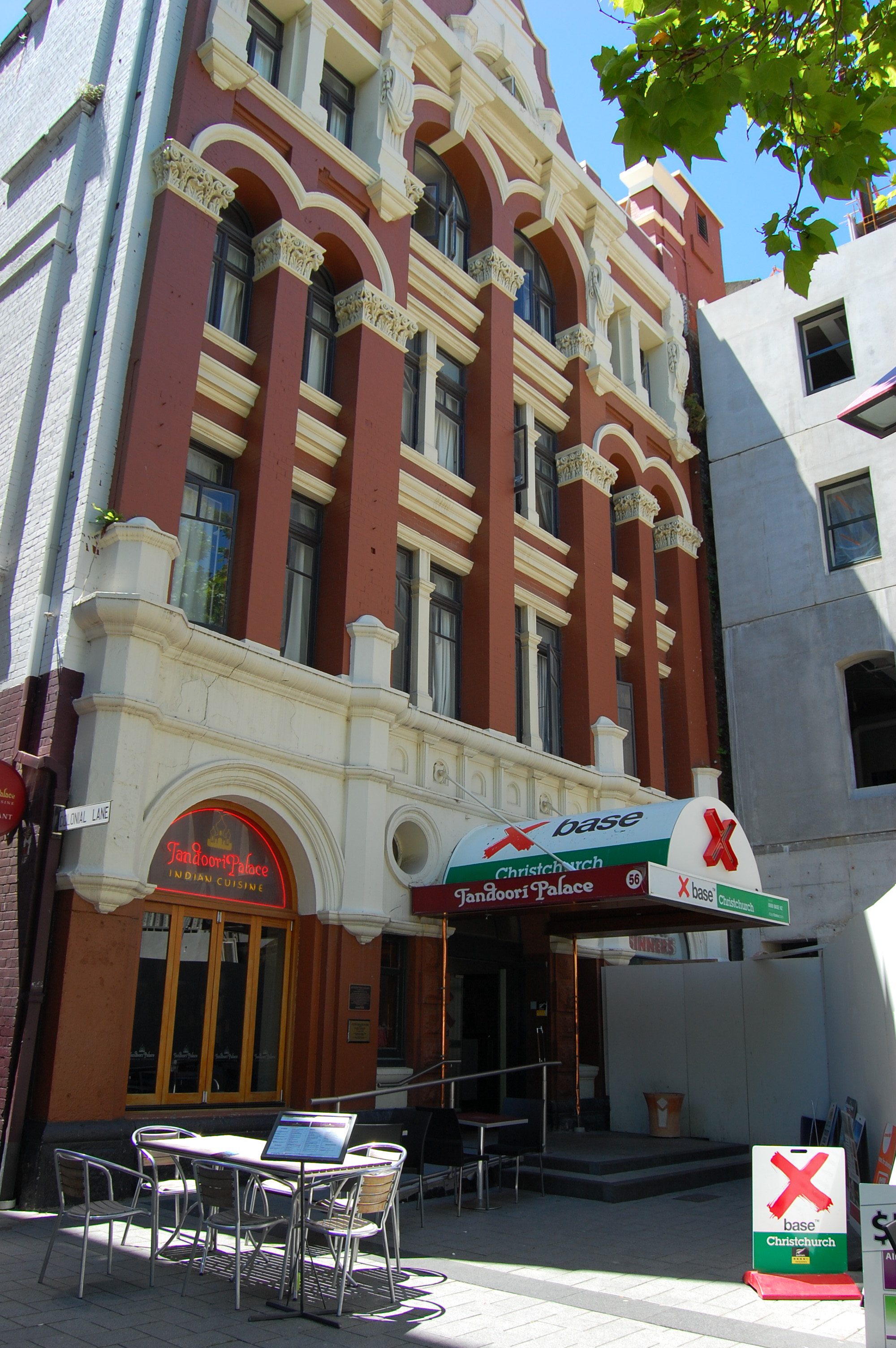
- The façade of the Lyttelton Times Building in December 2008.
- Interactive map of the Lyttelton Times Building area
- Alternative names: Base Backpackers

General information
- Type: Initially commercial, now hostel
- Architectural style: Chicago School
- Location: Cathedral Square, Christchurch Central City, 56 Cathedral Square, Christchurch, New Zealand
- Coordinates: 43.5302°S 172.6373°E
- Construction started: 1902
- Completed: 1904
- Demolished: 2011
- Client: Lyttelton Times

Technical details
- Structural system: Load bearing walls

Design and construction
- Architect: Sidney and Alfred Luttrell

Heritage New Zealand – Category 1
- Designated: 16-Dec-1994
- Reference no.: 7216

References
- "Lyttelton Times Building". New Zealand Heritage List/Rārangi Kōrero. Heritage New Zealand.

The Lyttelton Times Building, last known as Base Backpackers, in 56 Cathedral Square, Christchurch Central City, was the last headquarters of the Lyttelton Times before its demise in 1935 as the then-oldest newspaper in New Zealand. The building in Chicago School architectural style was registered with New Zealand Historic Places Trust as a Category I heritage item, with the registration number 7216. The building's last use was as a backpackers' hostel and a restaurant. It was demolished following the February 2011 Christchurch earthquake.

== Historical context ==
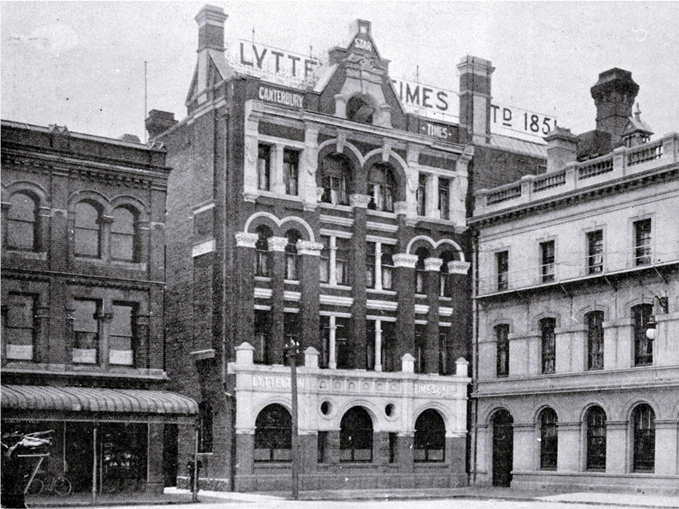
Lyttelton Times Building shortly after opening

The Lyttelton Times was devised by the Canterbury Association as part of the planned settlement of Canterbury. After arrival in mid December 1850, the first edition of the newspaper was published on 11 January 1851. From its initial location in the port town, Lyttelton, the newspaper moved its headquarters to the larger market of Christchurch in 1863. Its main competitor, The Press, had established itself in Christchurch in 1861.

== History ==
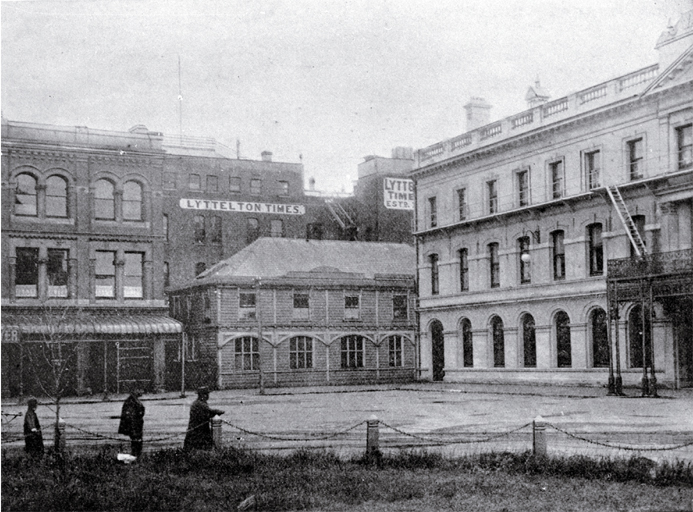
Two-storey wooden Lyttelton Times office in Cathedral Square in ca 1902. Behind it, the headquarters from 1884 fronting Gloucester Street are visible.

The site that the Lyttelton Times had occupied in Gloucester Street with an agency since the 1850s extended through to Cathedral Square. A two-storey wooden building was erected on the Cathedral Square frontage when the headquarters moved from Lyttelton. Further growth necessitated bigger premises, and what is now known as the Star Building was built on the Gloucester Street frontage in 1884. Growth continued, and Sidney and Alfred Luttrell were commissioned in 1902 to design a new building for the Cathedral Square frontage.

The Luttrell brothers had only recently come to Christchurch from Tasmania. The Lyttelton Times Building was their first major commission, and established them as architects and building contractors. They used the Chicago School architectural style for the design, and that was the first time that this was applied by them in New Zealand. While they employed the appearance of the façade of this style, they did not employ the structural system of an internal steel frame, but they relied on load bearing walls. With their later commissions, Manchester Courts in Christchurch and Consultancy House in Dunedin, both for the New Zealand Express Company, they came closer to using the structural design of the Chicago School. Construction of the Lyttelton Times Building started in ca 1902, and the building was finished in 1904. At the time, it was the tallest building in Cathedral Square besides the tower of ChristChurch Cathedral itself.

Initially, some of the rooms in the building were used by the adjacent Warner's Hotel, built in 1901 after the previous hotel burned down. The association with Warner's did not last long, as patrons were kept awake at night by the printing presses in the building. In fact, the noise environment was bad enough in Warner's Hotel itself, and the northern end of the hotel, which adjoined the Lyttelton Times Building, was removed in 1917 and the gap filled with the Liberty Theatre (later called the Savoy).

The Lyttelton Times changed its name to Christchurch Times in 1929, and in 1935, production of that newspaper folded owing to intense competition, with two morning papers and two evening papers being published in Christchurch at that time. The Press, which is still published today, took the morning newspaper market. The Lyttelton Times Company was renamed to New Zealand Newspapers Ltd and published the Star-Sun as an evening paper, as a continuation of their evening paper The Star, which had been published since 1868. Production of the Star-Sun continued in the building until 1958, when the newspaper shifted to premises in Kilmore Street and changed its name again to The Star. It is still published in Christchurch on Wednesdays and Fridays as a free newspaper.

In 1994, the building was registered as a heritage building by the New Zealand Historic Places Trust (NZHPT). In 1997, the owner of the Star Building, the Lyttelton Times Building and Warner's Hotel applied for demolition consent. At the time, only the Lyttelton Times Building was registered with the NZHPT. The hearing's commissioner, Bob Batty, granted permission for the Lyttelton Times Building to be demolished, declined the request for Warner's Hotel, and granted permission to demolish the Star Building, but its façade had to be kept. The Environment Court overturned the demolition consent, and the Lyttelton Times Building was purchased by the Christchurch Heritage Trust, which turned the building into a backpackers' hostel and a restaurant.

Following the February 2011 Christchurch earthquake, the Lyttelton Times Building was as of 2 April 2011 not on the list of buildings to be demolished. In August 2011, it was reported that the building has been demolished. The historic part of Warner's Hotel is understood to also needing demolition, while the adjacent The Press Building was demolished in July 2011.

== Heritage listing ==
On 16 December 1994, the building was registered by the New Zealand Historic Places Trust as a Category I historic place, with the registration number 7216. The Lyttelton Times Building in contemporary Chicago School architectural style is located in the same quadrant of Cathedral Square as The Press Building, and the two façades represent the two different newspaper styles, with The Press being regarded as the more conservative newspaper. The Lyttelton Times Building is part of the largest surviving group of heritage buildings in Cathedral Square. It introduced the Chicago School architectural style to Christchurch, and it was the first major commission for the Luttrell brothers, starting their New Zealand career.

The newspaper is an important part of the New Zealand history, often expressing a liberal view. Examples are the support of the trade unions in the lead up to the 1890 maritime strike, which swept across to New Zealand from Australia. Notable liberal politicians worked for the newspaper as editors, including William Reeves and his son William Pember Reeves.
