= Cheeky Weekly =

UK magazine

Cheeky Weekly was a British comic book magazine published every Monday by IPC Magazines Ltd. It ran for 117 issues from (issues dates) 22 October 1977 to 2 February 1980, failing to be published for 3 weeks in December 1978 due to an industrial dispute. It merged with stable-mate Whoopee!, initially as a 16-page pull-out section. The title character originated in an earlier comic called Krazy as a character in the strip The Krazy Gang and also the star of the 'Ello, It's Cheeky feature, and proved popular enough to get his own comic, which managed to outlive Krazy itself. The first issue came with a free "Red Jet Rattler" (a build-it-yourself model aeroplane). Its characters and strips included:

- Cheeky's Week, a comic strip featuring the title character meeting various regular characters with much joke-telling. This strip was drawn by Frank McDiarmid.
- Lily Pop
- Posh Claude
- Walter Wurx
- Jogging Jeremy
- Baby Burpo
- Baker's Boy
- Sid the Street Sweeper
- Ursula the Usherette

== Other Cheeky comic strips ==
- Mustapha Million comic strip
- Six Million Dollar Gran comic strip - This was a parody of The Six Million Dollar Man.
- Skateboard Squad comic strip, later renamed "Speed Squad"
- Tub - Tub was one of the characters from Cheeky's "Mystery Comic".
- Disaster Des comic strip - Des's comic strip began in Cheeky issue dated 30 September 1978 and continued until the last issue.
- Elephant On The Run - another of the characters from Cheeky's "Mystery Comic"
- Calculator Kid
- Paddywack
- Stage School
- Snail of the Century

For many of the later issues of Cheeky his unnamed pet snail had the back page and met other garden creatures to exchange jokes.

The lead character Cheeky was portrayed in a red and black striped sweater with a large C on the chest. At one point the comic gave away a free knitting pattern so readers could knit their own (or get their mums to knit one for them).

One unusual aspect of Cheeky Weekly compared to its contemporaries was that the title character appeared in more than one strip. A typical issue would follow Cheeky through the week from Sunday through to the following Saturday in a series of one- or two-page strips. Often not so much a narrative as a series of random gags each episode was designed to lead into the ‘support’ strip which followed.

Some notable examples include:

- Cheeky racing home to watch his favourite TV Show, usually arriving with seconds to spare.
- Cheeky trying to read the latest James Bold book in the bookshop – this would lead into a two-page ‘drama’ strip which would then end abruptly as the bookshop owner chased Cheeky from the store.

On Wednesdays, Cheeky babysat for Baby Burpo, a mischievous child similar to Whoopee!’s Sweeny Toddler. Cheeky would read him a tongue-in-cheek ghost story in the hope of scaring the kid but this invariably backfired and Cheeky would end up running home in terror as if pursued by whatever menace had featured in that week's story.

Initially on Saturdays, Cheeky attended a Saturday morning picture show at his local cinema where he saw a cartoon (often represented by a strip featuring Warner Brothers cartoon characters) followed by a drama serial, while exchanging jokes with his friends in the interval. After just over a year the cinema feature was dropped and subsequent issues showed Cheeky pursuing a variety of weekend activities instead.

"Cheeky Chit-Chat" was the readers' letter pages. Any reader who had their letter printed received £2 and a "Friend of Cheeky" badge.

The "Joke-Box Jury" page gave the readers a chance to send in jokes, with a prize of £2 if their joke was published.

== Whoopee! comic merger ==
For the first Whoopee! merged issue, Cheeky had the middle 16 pages (half the comic). Cheeky himself had 4 pages. Six Million Dollar Gran, renamed "Robot Granny" had 2 pages. Calculator Kid had 1 page. Stage School also had 2 pages. Paddywack had half a page. The letters page was renamed "Whoopee Chit-Chat" and usually occupied one and a half pages (the prize was £2 plus a Whoopee! logo'd T-shirt. Mustapha Million had 2 pages, though in 1981 many of these were reprints. On the 16 February 1980 issue a brand new single page comic strip Chip began. The other pages had advertising.

The last issue of Whoopee! to feature the Cheeky logo on the cover was dated 25 July 1981. The Whoopee! dated 5 September 1981 was the last to feature a 4-page Cheeky story and hereafter the Cheeky's comic strips were distributed throughout the comic (rather than the 16 central pages).
