= Jari Kuosma =

Jari Kuosma (born 3 March 1969 in Helsinki) is the original developer of modern and commercial wingsuit (as a product), wingsuit flying (as a sport) and owner of BirdMan Inc. Kuosma has over 5000 jumps. He has worked as an Accelerated Free Fall (AFF) Instructor in USA, Sweden and Venezuela. He introduced the first wingsuit training program for skydivers in 1999. A wingsuit instructor program followed the year after.

Kuosma began skydiving in 1990. He took part in the breaking of the Finnish record for free-falling formation in 1993, and introduced a Russian low-altitude jumping technique into Finland. He was introduced to wingsuits in 1997, based on those used by Patrick de Gayardon. With Robert Pecnik, he began selling wingsuits in 1999, after making them in Slovenia.

== Early life ==
Kuosma was raised in Helsinki, Finland by his father, who owned an army surplus store, and his mother, who was a secretary. As a teenager he practised martial arts.
