= Birdman and Chicken =

British comic strip by Trevor Metcalfe

Birdman and Chicken was a British comic strip published in Krazy from 1977 until 1978 and drawn by Trevor Metcalfe. It concerned the (mis)adventures of the superhero 'Birdman' and his not-so-bright sidekick 'Chicken', who was nicknamed 'The Boy Blunder'. The title and stories were a parody of Batman.

It ran in the issues of Krazy from 11 December 1976 to 25 June 1977 and 9 July 1977 to 15 April 1978, as well as the Krazy Annuals from 1978-1985. The only edition which was not illustrated by Metcalfe was The Bookworm Browser two-parter (10, 17 December 1977), which was illustrated by Thomas Williams.

== Rebellion revival ==
In September 2021 it was announced that Rebellion, publishers of 2000 AD would be relaunching the Monster Fun comic in April 2022, "revived and reimagined for today's kids".

A Monster Fun Halloween Special issue ("Halloween Spooktacular") was published in October 2021, which included a new Birdman & Chicken story (along with a new sidekick, Sparrow) entitled "The Lame Halloween", which was written by Doug Graves and drawn by Edward Whatley, with lettering by Pioro Dziob.

It has not yet been confirmed that Birdman & Chicken will appear in the new bi-monthly Monster Fun when it starts being published in April 2022, although the strip was not present in the first issue.
