= Regent Theatre, Christchurch =

Former building in New Zealand

Regent Theatre
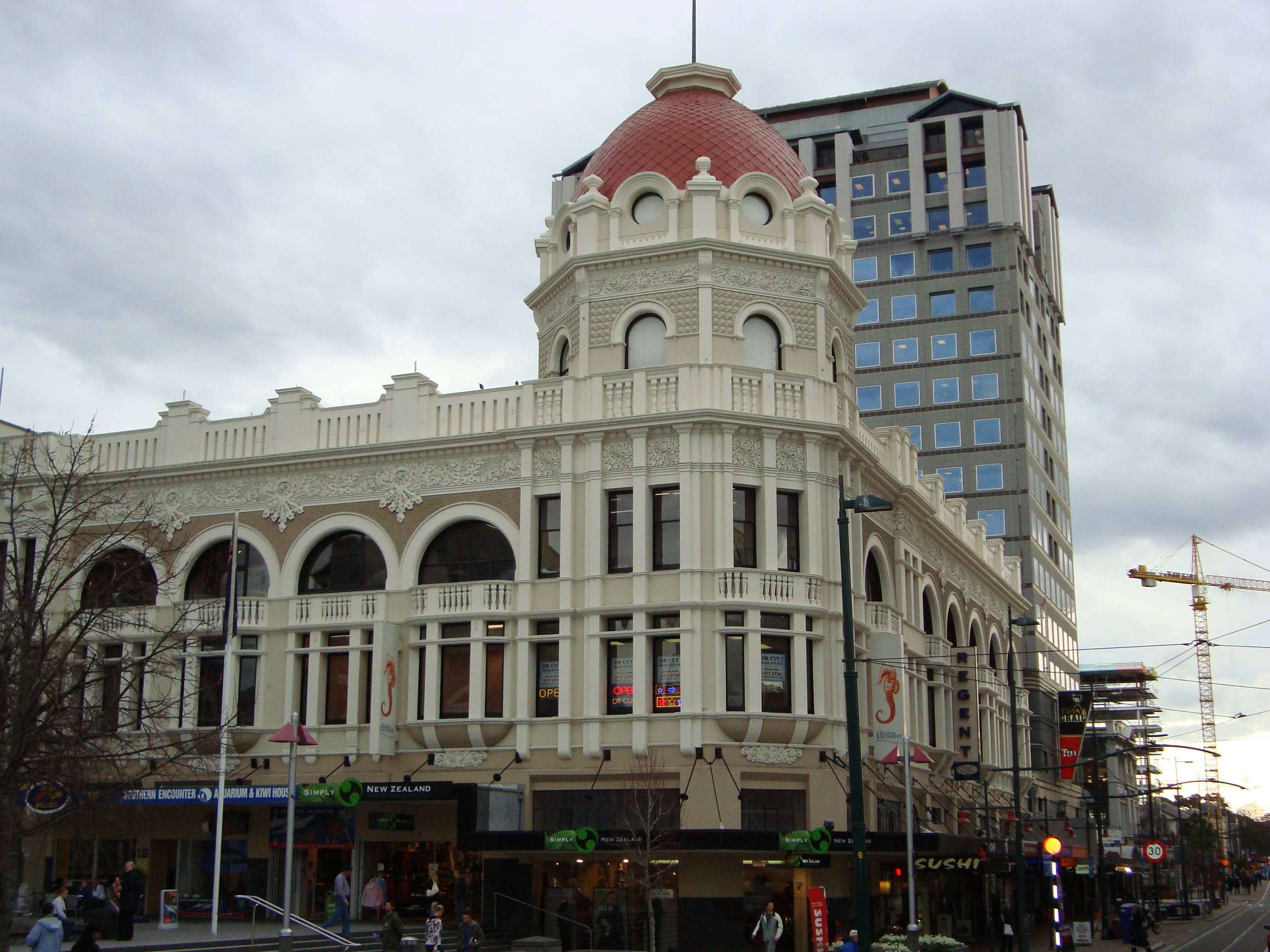
- The Regent Theatre in 2008
- Interactive map of the Regent Theatre area
- Former names: Royal Exchange Building

General information
- Architectural style: Edwardian
- Coordinates: 43°31′52″S 172°38′06″E
- Construction started: January 1904
- Opened: 1905
- Demolished: 2011

Heritage New Zealand – Category 1
- Designated: 30 August 1990
- Reference no.: 1918

The Regent Theatre was a building at the corner of Worcester Street and Cathedral Square in Christchurch, New Zealand. After opening in 1905, its first primary tenant was the Royal Exchange Assurance Corporation, giving the building the name Royal Exchange Building at the time. In 1930, the interior was renovated and a cinema was added, giving the building the name Regent Theatre. In 1990, it was listed by Heritage New Zealand as a Category I historic place. It was damaged in the 2010 Canterbury and 2011 Christchurch earthquakes and was subsequently demolished due to it being damaged beyond repair.

== Building ==
The Regent Theatre was located at the corner of Worcester Street and Cathedral Square. It was designed in the Edwardian Baroque architectural style, popular in Britain, but also had some influence from American architecture. The building was designed by brothers Sidney and Alfred Luttrell, the architects for Christchurch's Manchester Courts and Dunedin's Consultancy House, among other notable buildings. It was originally planned to have a turret at the top, but a dome was used instead.

== History ==
Construction of the building began in January 1904 and had its first tenant, a pharmacy, move in while the building was still being constructed in November 1904. It opened in 1905, becoming the "first major Edwardian building" to be built in Cathedral Square.

The building was originally known as the Royal Exchange Building, after one of its main tenants, the Royal Exchange Assurance Corporation, a British insurance company that came to New Zealand in 1892. The building also housed several other commercial tenants, with warehouse, office and retail space. In June 1905 the Royal Cafe opened and used a considerable amount of the second floor, with entry being afforded by some of the first examples of electric lifts in New Zealand.

In 1930, the architect J. S. Guthrie redesigned the interior of the building, keeping the exterior unchanged. He used gilt, mirrors and marble in order to give the interior a luxurious appearance, later described as "the grandeur and charm of Old Spain". It reopened as the Regent Theatre and had what was then the largest screen in Australasia.

In 1979, the interior was lost to a fire. The theatre reopened two years later, with two separate screening rooms. In 1990, Heritage New Zealand listed the building as a Category 1 historic place. In 1994, Carter Group bought the building and the cinema became leased by Hoyts. After renovations, in 1996 Hoyts opened a cinema with multiple screens in the top floor. In 1997, the Southern Encounter Aquarium opened on the south-east corner of the ground floor, while the rest of the first and second floors became offices and the ground floor had shops. Later on, an apartment was built inside the dome. In May 2010 the Carter Group listed the building for sale.

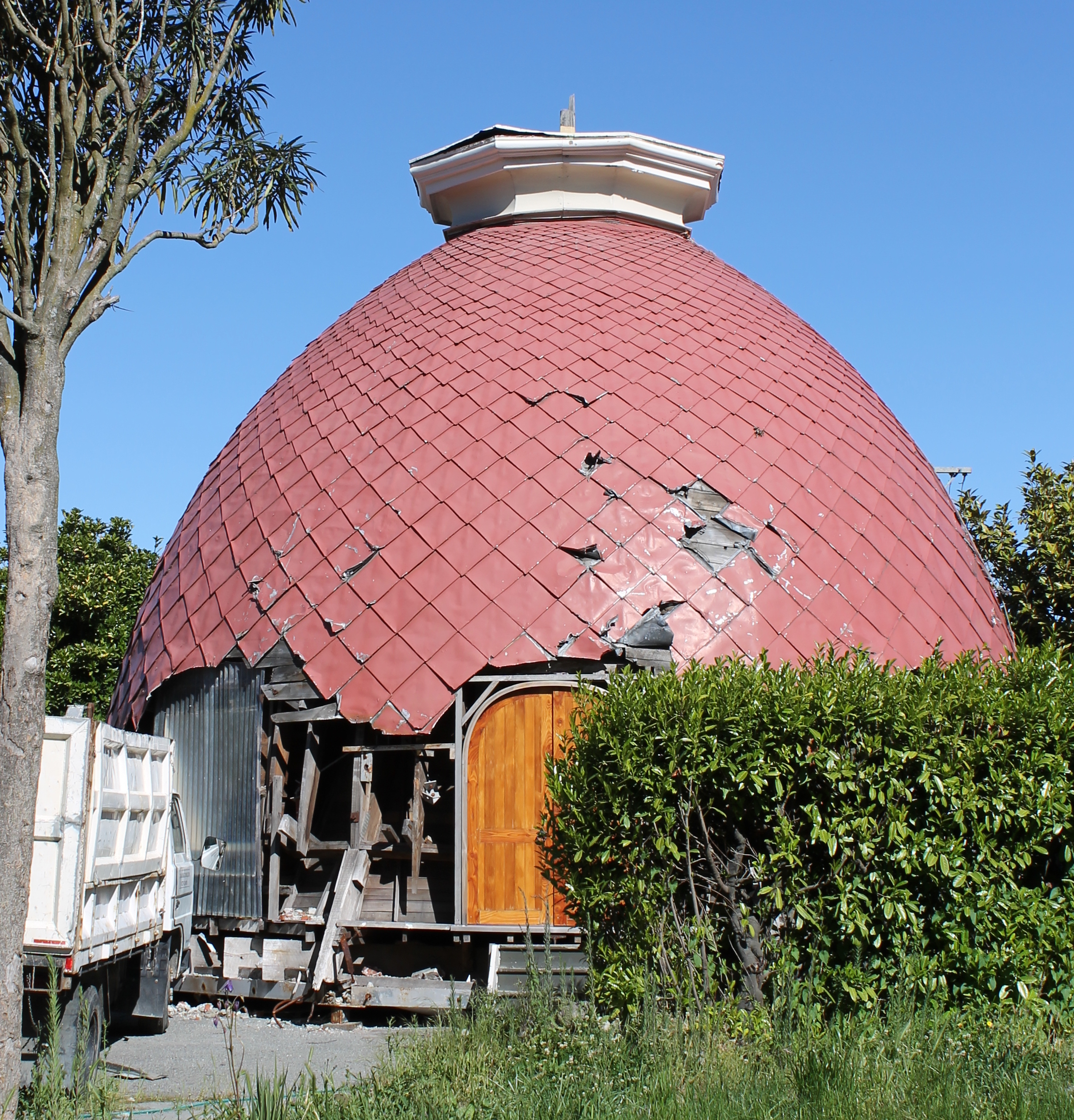
The dome in Linwood in November 2012

The September 2010 Canterbury and February 2011 Christchurch earthquakes caused damage to the building, leading to the decision in April 2011 that it would be demolished. It took until the early 2020s for a new building to be erected on the site. As of 2025, the former building's dome is located on a residential property in the suburb of Linwood.

== See also ==
- List of historic places in Christchurch
