= Wingman (disambiguation) =

A wingman is a pilot who supports another in a potentially dangerous flying environment.

Wingman also may refer to:

== Television ==
- "Wingman" (Person of Interest), an episode of the television series Person of Interest
- "Wingman" (Lucifer), an episode of the television series Lucifer
- "Wingman" (Sanctuary), an episode of the television series Sanctuary
- "Wingman" (Kim's Convenience), an episode of the television series Kim's Convenience
- "The Wingman", an episode of the television series Schitt's Creek

== Other uses ==
- Wing-Man, a manga series
- Wingmen (novel), a novel by Ensan Case
- Wingman (social), a companion intended to facilitate social interaction
- Wingman and Wingman 2, Enix home computer games
- Ko Wing-man (born 1957), Hong Kong physician and politician

== See also ==
- Winger (disambiguation)
