= Winger =

Winger may refer to:

== Arts and entertainment ==
- Winger (band), an American hard rock band
  - Winger (album), the band's self-titled debut album
- Winger (novel), a 2013 book by Andrew Smith
- Winger, a recurring character in the Garrett P.I. fantasy book series

== Places ==
- Winger, Minnesota, a city in the United States
- Winger Township, Polk County, Minnesota

== Sport ==
- Winger (sports), a position on the extreme left and right sides in many sports
  - Winger (association football)
  - Winger (ice hockey)
  - Winger (rugby league)
  - Winger (rugby union)

== Other uses ==
- Winger (surname), a list of people so named
- Tata Winger, a van produced by Tata Motors

== See also ==
- Leftwinger (disambiguation)
- Right winger
