= Hawkman (disambiguation) =

Hawkman is the name of several superheroes appearing in American comic books published by DC Comics.

Hawkman or Hawkmen may also refer to:

== In comics ==
- Hawkman (Katar Hol)
- Hawkman (Carter Hall)
- Hawkman (Fel Andar)
- Hawkmen, members of Thanagar's police force in DC Comics
- Hawkmen, the bird-like people led by Prince Vultan in Flash Gordon stories
- Hawkman, a villain in the manga Kinnikuman

== In music ==
- Hawkman, stage name of Garrison Hawk, a reggae artist who collaborated with trip-hop artist Tricky
- "Hawkman", nickname for MC Hawking

== See also ==
- Falconry
- Birdman (disambiguation)
