= Chief Post Office, Christchurch =

Chief Post Office
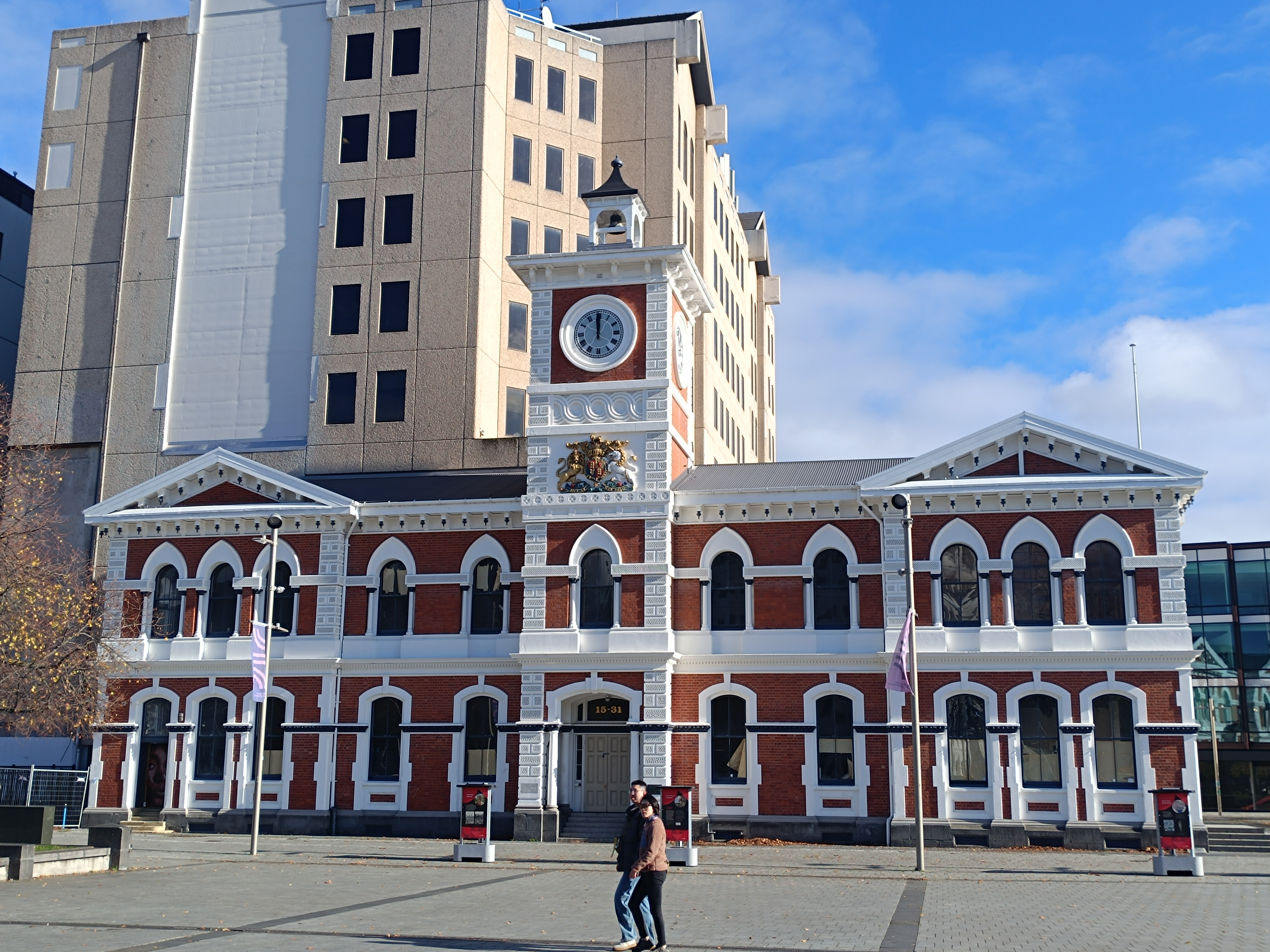
- The Chief Post Office following the completion of restoration work
- Interactive map of the Chief Post Office area

General information
- Type: Government, with some commercial enterprises
- Architectural style: Italianate style with classical and Venetian Gothic elements
- Location: Cathedral Square, Christchurch Central City, 31 Cathedral Square, Christchurch, New Zealand
- Coordinates: 43.53141°S 172.63576°E
- Current tenants: None
- Construction started: 24 May 1877
- Completed: 1878
- Renovated: 1907
- Owner: Gordon Chamberlin

Technical details
- Floor count: Two

Design and construction
- Architect: William Henry Clayton
- Main contractor: Dan Reese

Heritage New Zealand – Category 1
- Designated: 2 April 1985
- Reference no.: 291

References
- "Chief Post Office (Former)". New Zealand Heritage List/Rārangi Kōrero. Heritage New Zealand.

The Chief Post Office or Christchurch Central Post Office, originally known as the Government Buildings, is located in Cathedral Square, Christchurch, New Zealand. The building was initially a post office with Immigration, Customs and Public Works departments. The Government Buildings were later replaced by the new Government Buildings opened in 1913, and the Chief Post Office remained on-site. In 1881, New Zealand’s first telephone exchange was installed in the building. Post services were offered from the building until 2000 when it was re-purposed to house a Christchurch tourist information centre and a restaurant, café and offices. Following the 2011 Christchurch earthquake the building closed. In the early 2020s repairs and strengthening took place. The building was planned to reopen in 2023 in stages, and eventually include a restaurant, shops, and a visitor information centre, under the name "The Grand". The structure is registered with Heritage New Zealand as a Category I heritage building.

== Geography ==
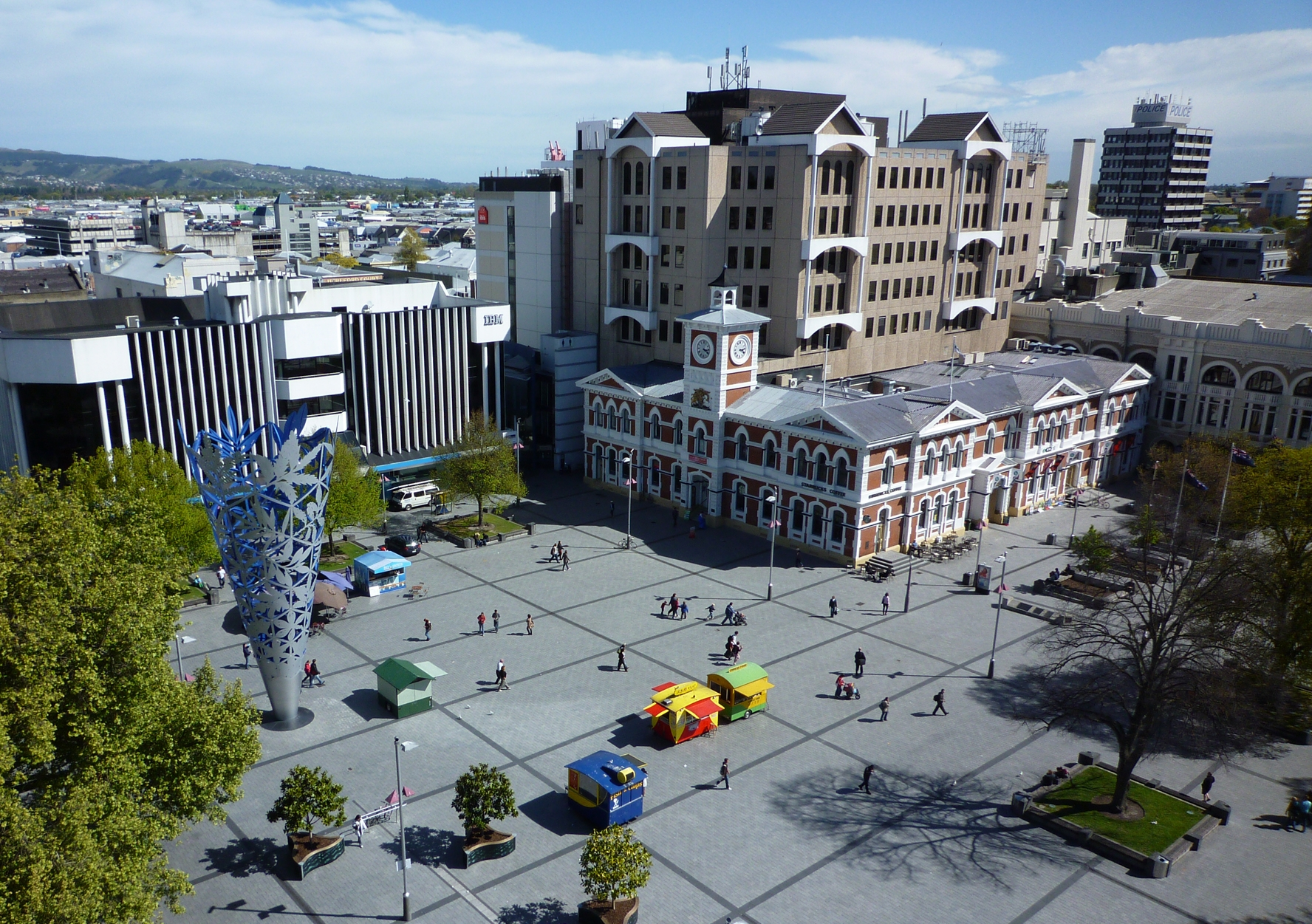
The building's setting within Cathedral Square in 2009

The building is located at 31 Cathedral Square, and is situated in the Square's southwest corner. Footpaths and a cabstand were added after the post office opened. During the 1992 redesign and redevelopment process of the Square, the road in front of the former Chief Post Office was closed.

== History ==
In 1863, the New Zealand House of Representatives noted an important change was to take place in Canterbury, in that Christchurch would replace Lyttelton as the principal post town. The General Government was renting several government buildings in Canterbury, some of which were inconveniently situated or badly constructed. Christchurch's first post office was very small, and located at Market Square, these days known as Victoria Square.

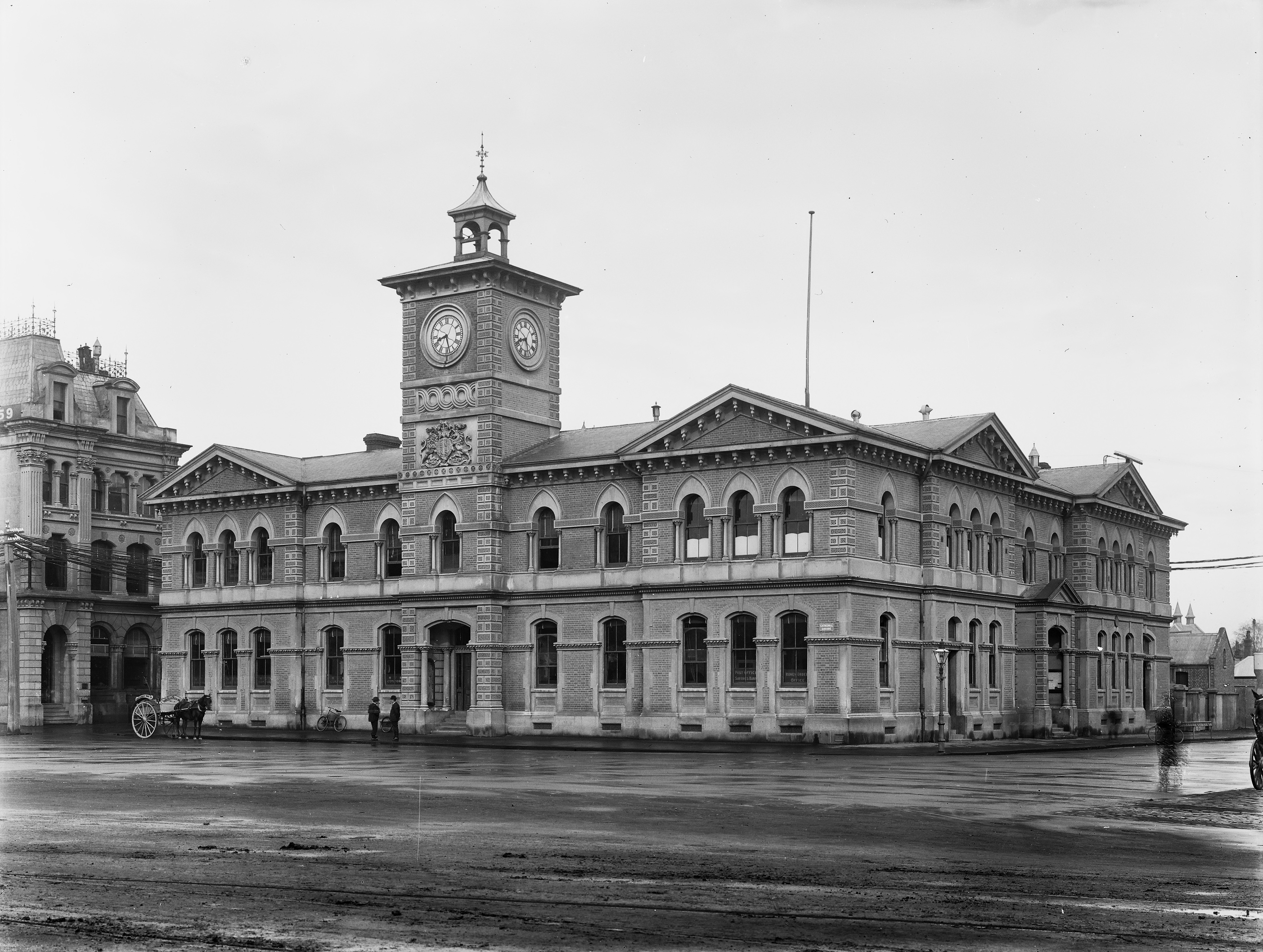
Chief Post Office prior to the 1907 extension, still with two symmetrical façades

The Canterbury Provincial Council, with the sanction of the General Government, agreed to erect government buildings in Cathedral Square, opposite the Anglican Church's building site. A Bill passed in 1873 vested the site in the Crown. Plans were drawn by William Henry Clayton, the first (and only) Colonial Architect to New Zealand. Clayton had previously designed the (former) post office in Lyttelton, and that building, smaller but similar in style, is regarded as his "trial run" for the building in the Square. The building was at the time referred to as the new Government Buildings. While it was agreed that the new building should accommodate the General Government, opinions differed on whether the construction should be ornamental. A prevailing motion approved that some regard ought to be paid to a little architectural finish.

The construction contract was awarded to Dan Reese. The foundation stone was laid by Hon Edward Richardson, a Christchurch member of parliament who until earlier in the year had been the first Minister of Public Works, on Queen's Birthday on 24 May 1877. The event was poorly attended, partly because no programme had been arranged beforehand. In his speech, Richardson reflected on the lengthy delay of starting construction, owing to the controversy about the building site. The mayor, Fred Hobbs, then used his address to lobby the attending members of parliament for a Resident Magistrate's Court (which was built in 1880/81). Since nobody came forward to speak afterwards, the crowd dispersed. Attendees of the ceremony were Bishop Harper, MHR William Rolleston, MHR Edward Stevens and MHR William Montgomery.

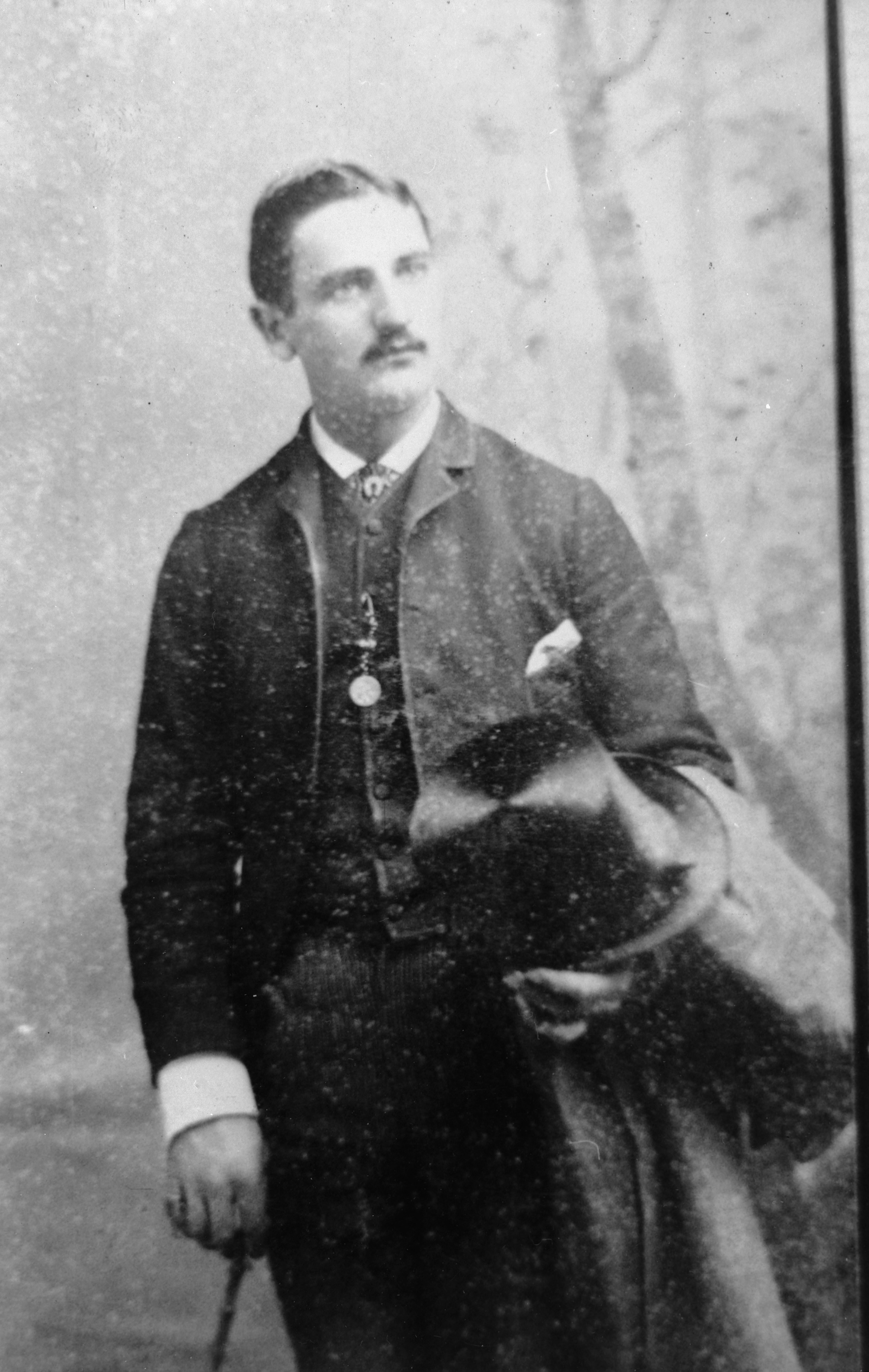
William Clayton in 1860

Soon after laying the foundation stone, Clayton died and the work was supervised by his assistant Pierre Finch Martineau Burrows. The building was completed in 1878. It opened behind schedule on 14 July 1879.

The building originally housed the postal department as well as other Government and administration offices. In 1881, New Zealand's first telephone exchange was installed in the building. The building was extended in 1907 to the west by adding a third gable; up until that point, it had two symmetrical façades. The extension was designed and supervised by Burrows. When the new Government Building opened at the eastern end of the Square in 1913, the postal services remained and the building became known as the Chief Post Office.

In the 1930s, the post office was threatened by demolition, as more space was required. Construction of a new post office didn't start until 1989, immediately to the south of the existing building. The seven-storey building dominates and impairs the historic structure, and parts of the old building had to be demolished to make way for the high rise.

The building suffered minimal damage in the 2010 Canterbury earthquake, and only minor damage in the February 2011 Christchurch earthquake. The landlord, Gordon Chamberlain, director of Chrystal Imports, feared that necessary repair to or demolition of nearby high-rise buildings would restrict access to his buildings for "years". Of the four other central city buildings owned by Crystal Imports, two were demolished, including Warner's Hotel on the opposite side of the Square.

It was announced in 2020 that the building would be restored into a hospitality and visitor complex called The Grand which would occupy the entire building it hoped to open in 2021. The opening of the complex was delayed due to COVID-19 and failed fundraising but in June 2022 the crowd funding goal was met and would open in August 2022 but that date was pushed back again and it was planned to open sometime after March 2023, but failed to open. The company behind the plan went into voluntary administration in August 2024.

== Architecture and fittings ==
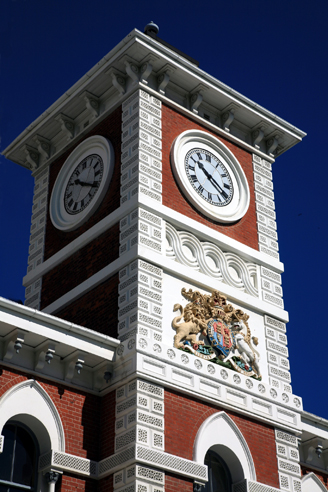
The clock tower with the UK royal coat of arms

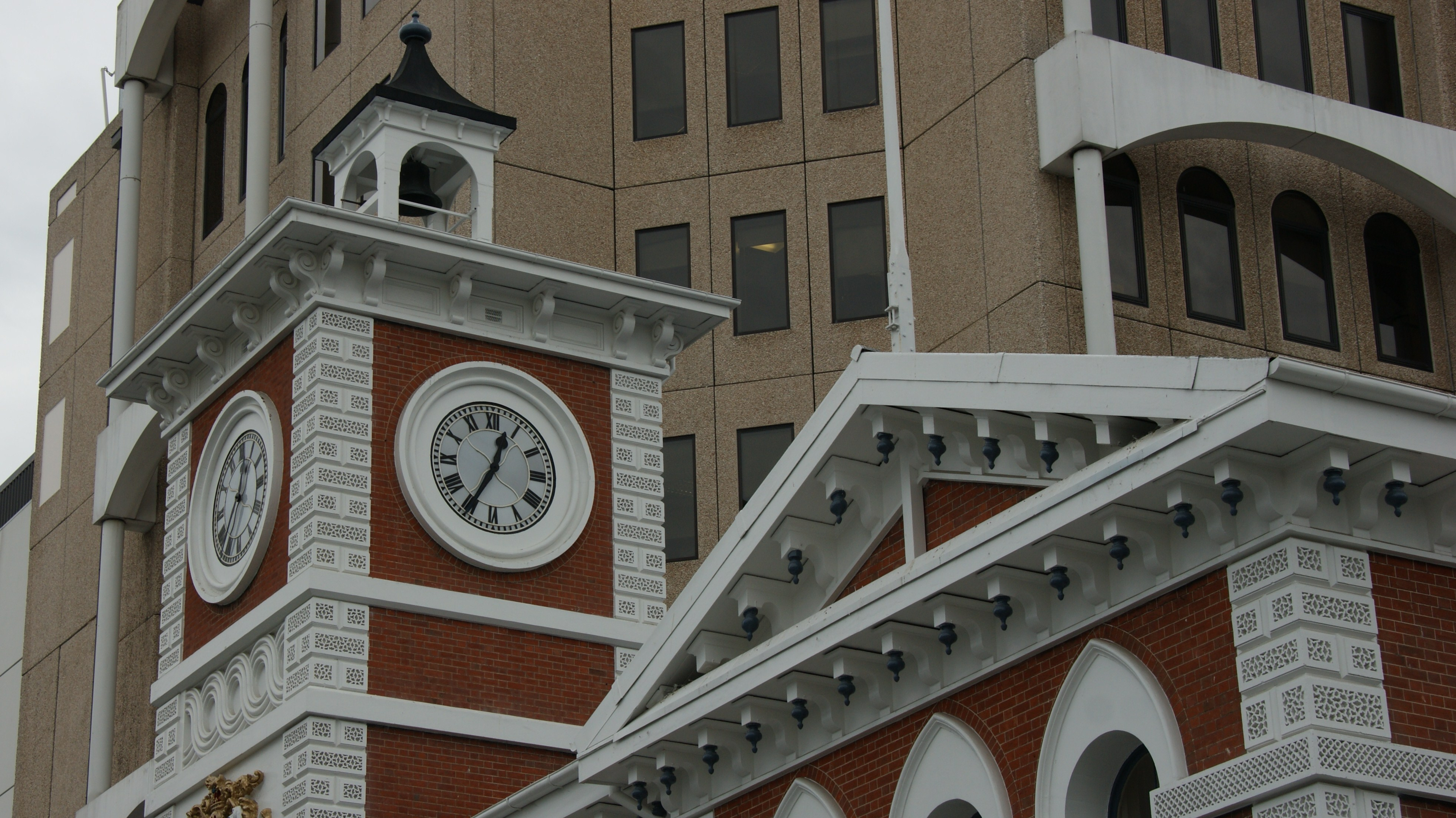
Architectural detail with the dominant Telecom high-rise in the background

Built of brick, the design is Italianate style with classical and Venetian Gothic elements. The upper windows feature pointed arches. A later renovation brought a third gabled bay to the north frontage. The building is registered with the New Zealand Historic Places Trust as a Category I heritage item, with the registration number 291.

Clock

Reputed to be a replica of London's Great Clock of Westminster, a working, free standing, four faced turret clock was installed in 1879 within a clock tower. Underneath the east facing clock face is the Royal coat of arms of the United Kingdom. Notable for being unreliable, an electric clock was eventually installed to control the visible faces as slave clocks. While at one time it chimed on the hour and at the quarters, after the mechanisms were damaged in a 1980s fire, the clock became silent.

== See also ==
- List of oldest buildings in Christchurch
