= Cathedral Square, Christchurch =

Square in Christchurch, New Zealand

Cathedral Square
- Public square
- Whiti-reia (Māori)
- Nickname: The Square
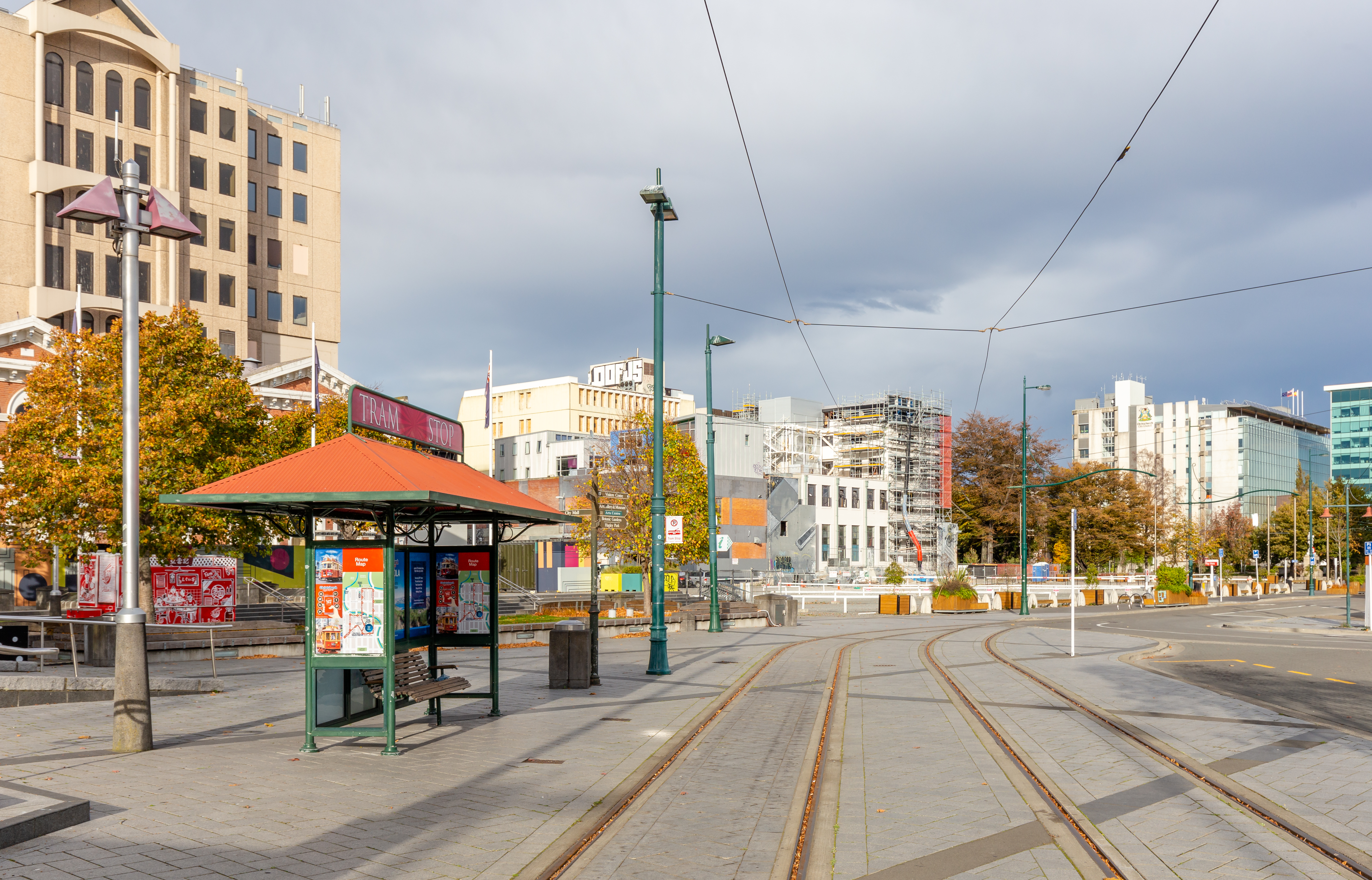
- Cathedral Square in 2020
- Location: Christchurch, New Zealand
- Interactive map of Cathedral Square
- Coordinates: 43°31′51″S 172°38′11″E

Cathedral Square, locally known simply as the Square, is the geographical centre and heart of Christchurch, New Zealand, where the city's Anglican cathedral, Christ Church Cathedral is located. The square stands at the theoretical crossing of the city's two main orthogonal streets, Colombo Street and Worcester Street, though in practice both have been either blocked off or detoured around the square itself. The square was badly damaged in the February 2011 Christchurch earthquake.

== Naming ==
The square was originally intended to be called Ridley Square, after the Protestant martyr Nicholas Ridley, but in Edward Jollie's 1850 plan of central Christchurch it was marked as Cathedral Square. Ridley's co-martyrs and colleague bishops, Cranmer and Latimer have Squares named after them, not far distant from Cathedral Square. The original choice of Ridley is another of Christchurch's many references to Oxford, since Ridley was martyred there.

Although always called a "square", its shape is that of a cruciform.

== History ==
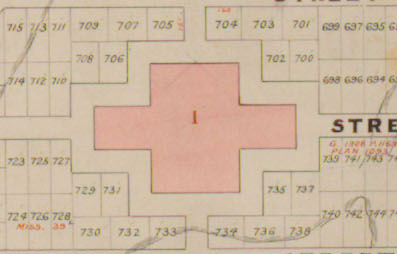
Cathedral Square-part of the Black Map

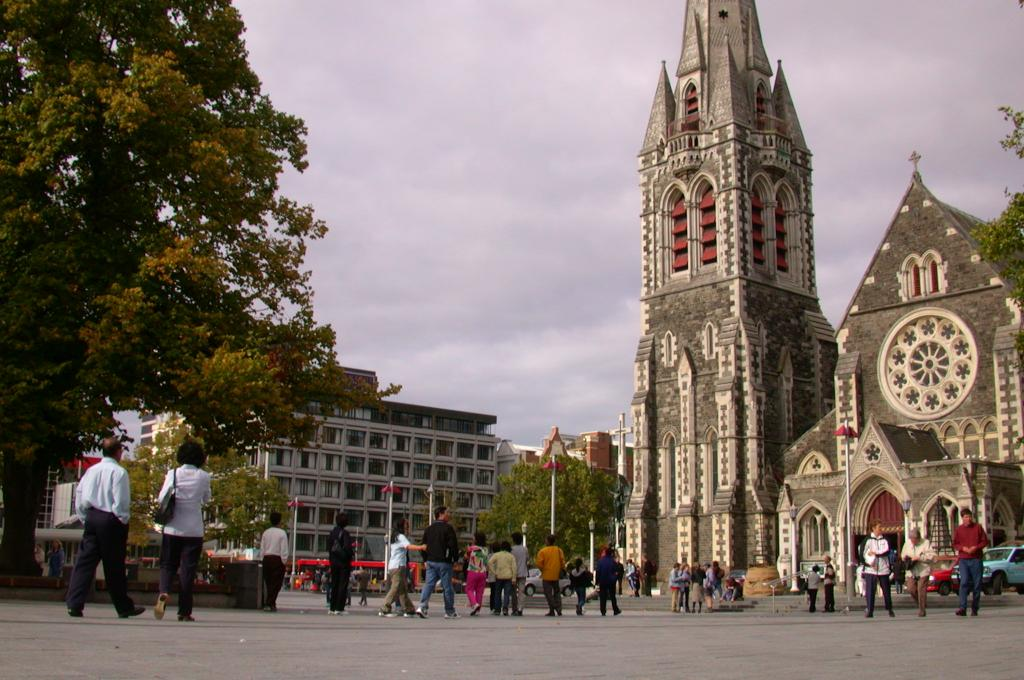
Cathedral Square in Christchurch, with Christ Church Cathedral in the background prior to the 2011 Christchurch earthquake

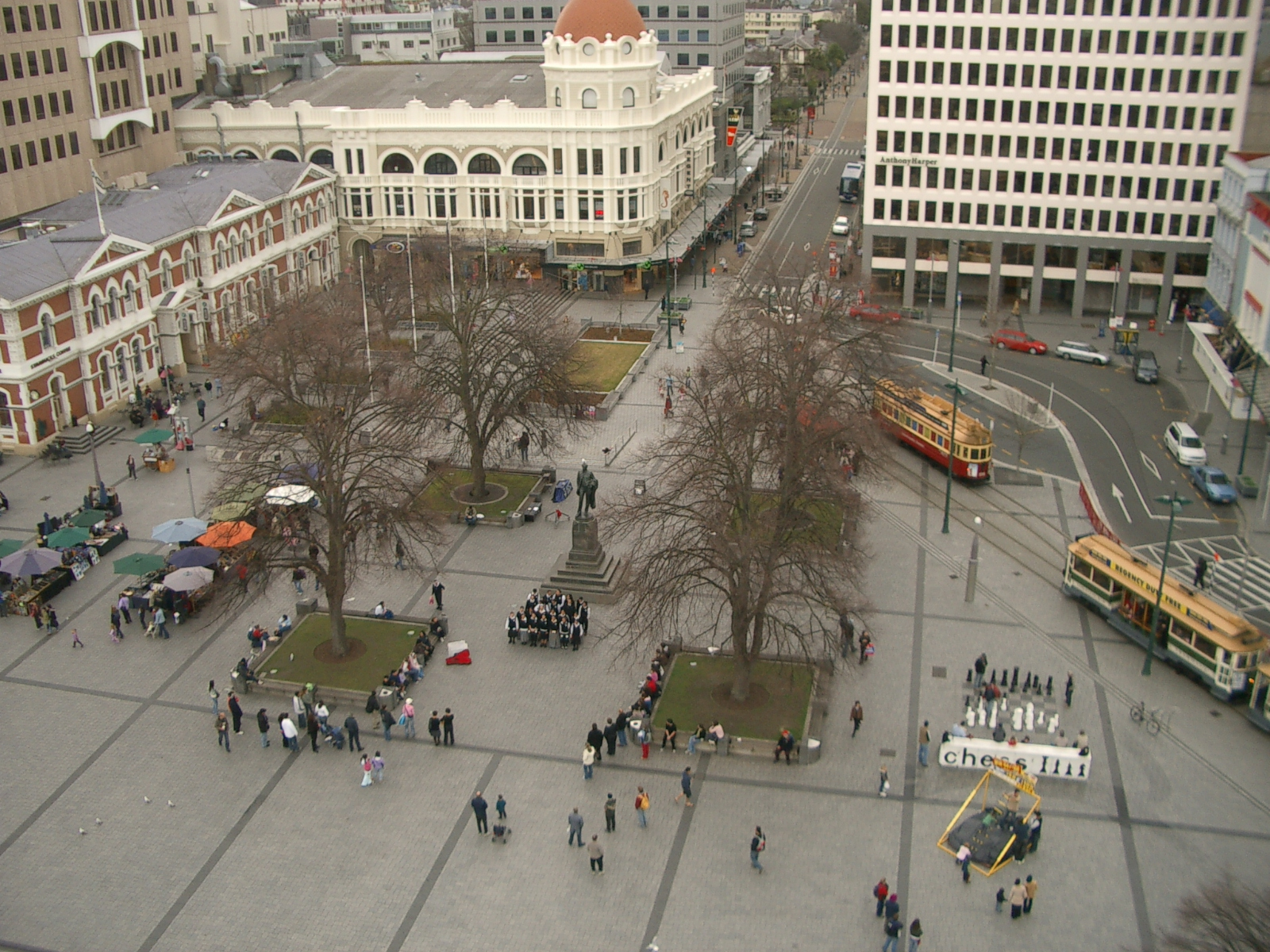
A view of Cathedral Square from the Christ Church Cathedral (2006)

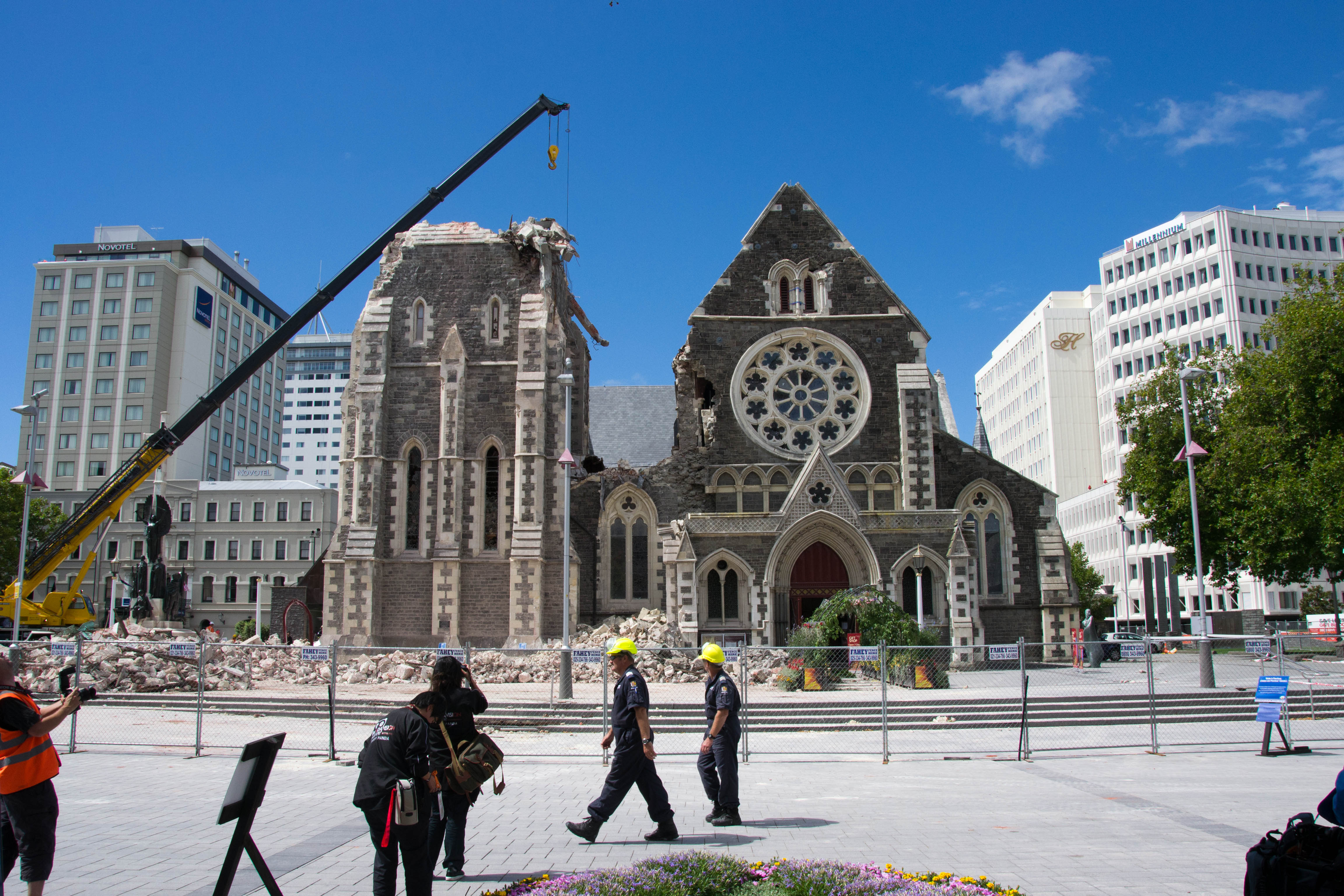
Damage from the February 2011 Christchurch earthquake on the square

In the original survey of central Christchurch (known as the Black Map), which was undertaken in 1850, it was envisaged for Christ's College and Christ Church Cathedral to be built adjacent to one another in Cathedral Square, modelled on Christ Church, Oxford. The area set aside for the college in Cathedral Square was found to be insufficient, and Henry Sewell suggested in June 1853 to move the college to land reserved for the Christchurch Botanic Gardens. This transaction was formalised through The Cathedral Square Ordinance 1858, a law passed by the Canterbury Provincial Council in October 1858. The ordinance allowed for Colombo Street to go straight through the middle of Cathedral Square at a legal width of 1.5 chains (99 ft; 30 m), and the cathedral to be placed west of this thoroughfare.

Christianity has adopted the practice of praying towards the East as the Orient was thought of as containing the mankind's original home. Hence, most Christian churches are oriented towards the east, and to comply with this convention, Henry Harper, Christchurch's first Bishop, lobbied to have the eastern side of Cathedral Square to be used for the pro-cathedral. That way, the main entrance would face Colombo Street, resulting in praying towards the east in line with convention. The Cathedral Square Amendment Ordinance 1859, which was passed a year after the previous ordinance, formalised the change in placement of the cathedral.

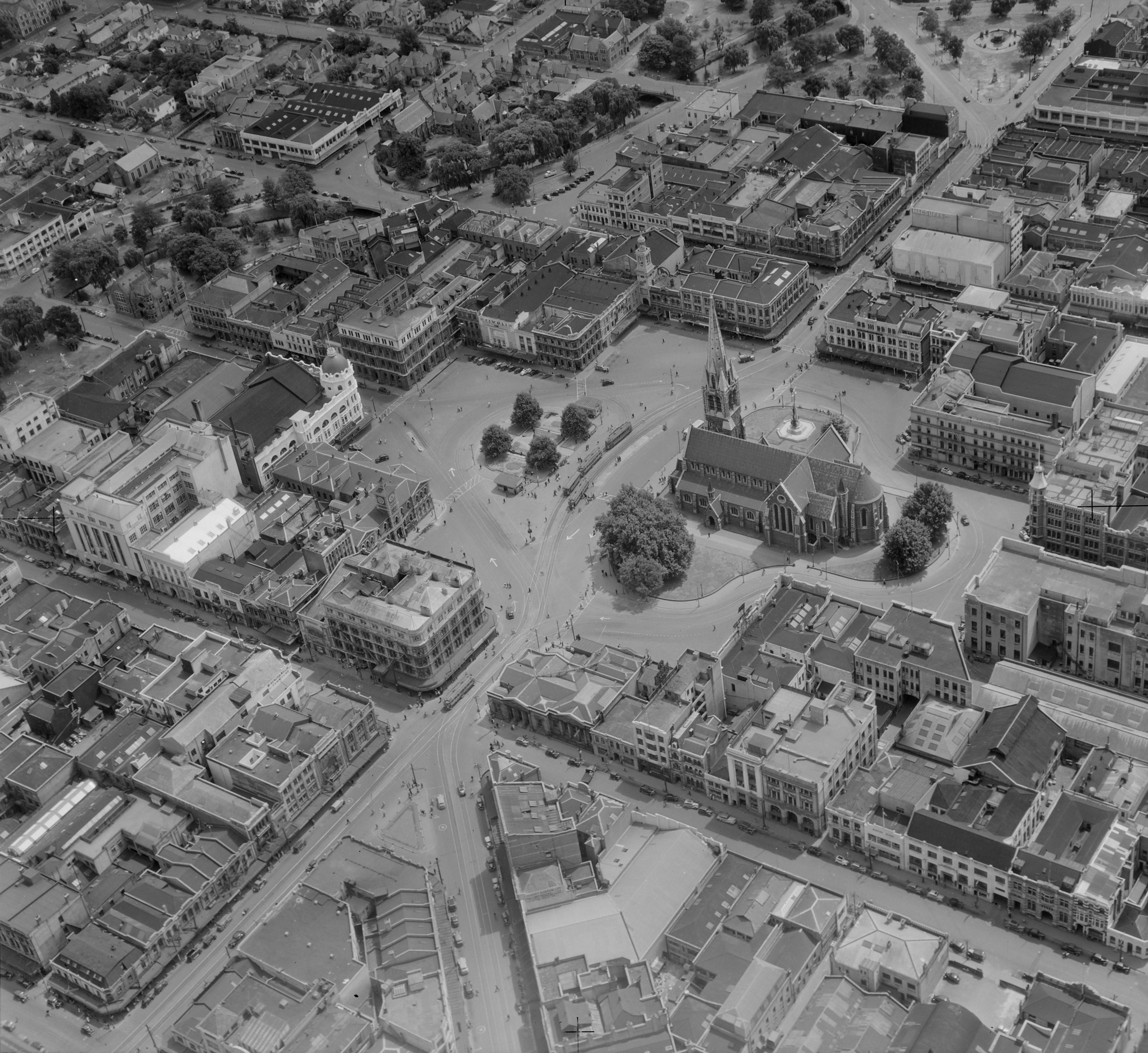
Aerial view of Cathedral Square showing the curved alignment of Colombo Street (pre-1954)

Just before work on the cathedral's foundations began in 1864, the alignment of Colombo Street through Cathedral Square was changed again by introducing a curve towards the west; the western side of the legal road had a radius of 3 chains 75 links (75 m). The purpose of this change was to allow the placement of the cathedral slightly further west, making its tower visible along Colombo Street from a distance. Up to the point of work starting on the cathedral, here was initially little development.

The statue of John Robert Godley, the city's founder, was unveiled on 6 August 1867 on a pedestal opposite the cathedral. It was the first public statue in New Zealand. The city's central post office was located alongside the square in 1879.

Over the years Cathedral Square has been redesigned on several occasions. Two significant changes took place when the road in front of the cathedral was closed in 1965, and the road in front of the Post Office closed in 1972. In the late 1990s / early 2000s, the Square underwent a significant reconstruction using new tiling. This was an often criticised project, for example for the amount of glare that the tiles gave off in dry weather conditions, or the tiles being slippery when wet.

In 2001, The Chalice was revealed, a large modern sculpture in the forum of an inverted cone dedicated to the millennium, designed by Neil Dawson and made up of 42 leaf patterns featuring different plants.

Before 2011, the Square was the city's main meeting place for people and was a regular site of street performers and speakers. The most notable of the square's "characters" was The Wizard of New Zealand, but others including the "Birdman", "Charlie of the Square", and the "Bible Lady" were regular fixtures and became minor tourist attractions.

New designs for the Square were unveiled in 2017 which would remove the roadways through the square and add green space and waterways and split it into five zones (Post Office Place, The Courtyard, Library Plaza, Cathedral Gardens and The Living Room). But the plan lacks funding and the original plans have been shelved.

Te Pae Christchurch Convention Centre opened in 2021 as one of the city's anchor projects and the third new building in the Square since the earthquakes after Tūranga and the Spark building.

In 2022 plans to renovate "tatty" corners of the square started these plans were meant to begin in 2019 but had been delayed. Minor work on these plans begun in late 2022 but in July 2023 work started on the completion of these plans in front of the Spark building, Distinction hotel and Old Government building.

Following the earthquakes, Christchurch's Anzac Day dawn services were mostly held in Cranmer Square rather than Cathedral Square. This was until 2023 when dawn services returned to Cathedral Square.

== Registered heritage places ==
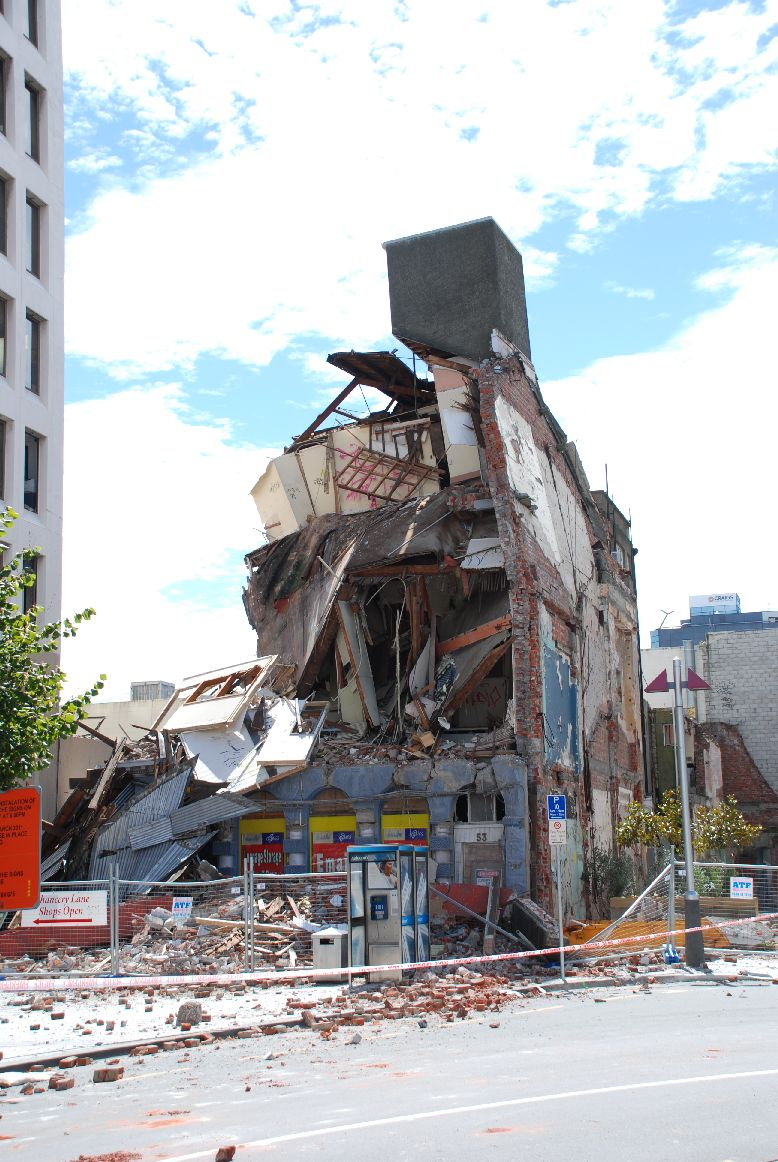
The Sevicke Jones Building collapsed after the 2011 earthquake.

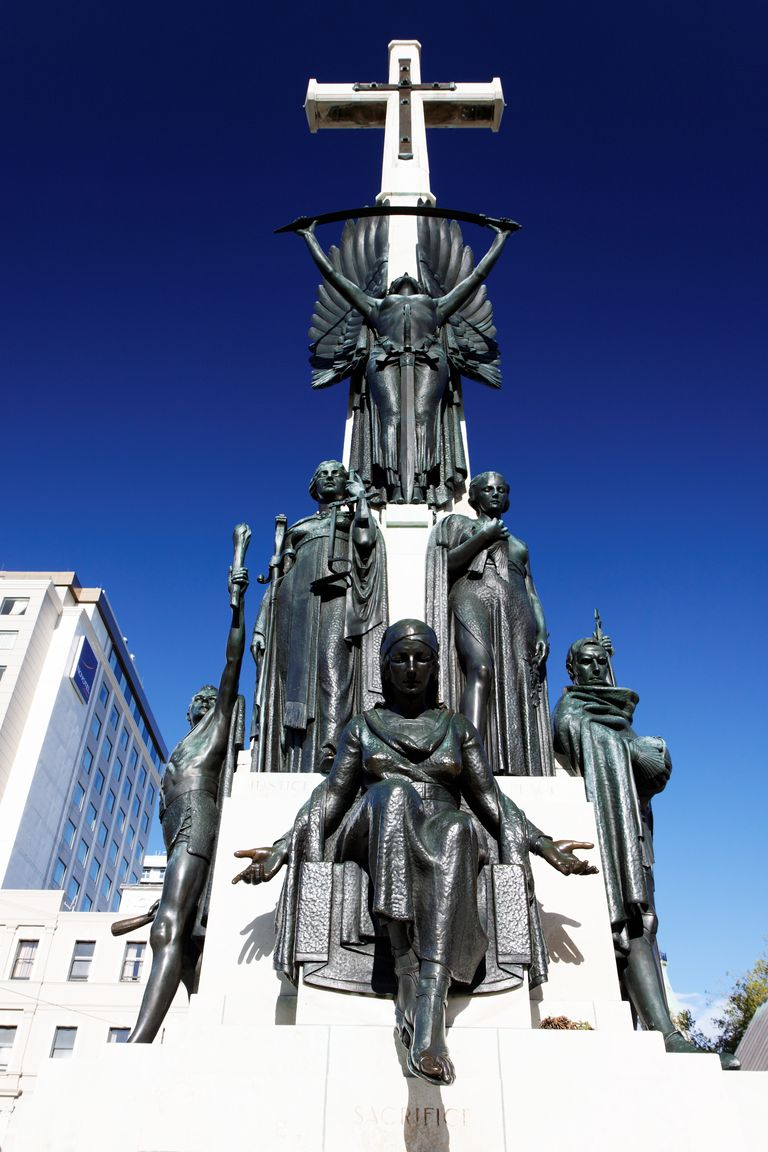
Citizens' War Memorial

Cathedral Square has a large number of buildings and statues that are registered as heritage items with Heritage New Zealand. Many of those were damaged in the February 2011 Christchurch earthquake and because of earthquake damage some have been lost as a consequence.

Category I places

- Christ Church Cathedral is arguably the most important heritage building. It was registered on 7 April 1983.
- The Press Building was registered on 2 April 1984. It was significantly damaged in the February 2011 earthquake and was demolished in July 2011.
- The former Chief Post Office was also registered on 2 April 1984.
- The Old Government Building was registered on 5 April 1984.
- The Citizens' War Memorial was registered on 6 September 1984.
- The statue of John Robert Godley was registered on 2 April 1985. The statue fell off its plinth in the 2011 Christchurch earthquake and time capsules were discovered inside the plinth.
- The Regent Theatre was registered on 30 August 1990.
- The Lyttelton Times Building was registered on 16 December 1994. It was demolished in 2011.

Category II places

- The Sevicke Jones Building was registered on 28 April 1995. The building collapsed in the February 2011 earthquake.
- Warner's Hotel was registered on 24 April 1997. The historic part of the hotel was demolished.

== Transport function ==
The Chalice alongside the cathedral

When steam trams began operating in the city in 1880, they left from the Square. Later, when buses replaced trams in 1954, the Square was used as the main point of departure. For many years, the square was a busy road intersection. In 1962, the road in front of the cathedral was closed. In 1972 it was redeveloped to provide large pedestrian areas, and the south-west quadrant was closed to traffic.

Trams returned in 1995, with the introduction of a tourist tram ride around the central city. Most buses left the Square when the Bus Exchange in Lichfield Street opened in November 2000. Since then, the public transport use of the Square was by the airport bus, taxis and shuttles. In February 2011 due to the earthquake the Square was closed off but was reopened on 30 June 2013, however some areas and buildings remained fenced off due to earthquake damage.

== Gallery ==
Views of Cathedral Square
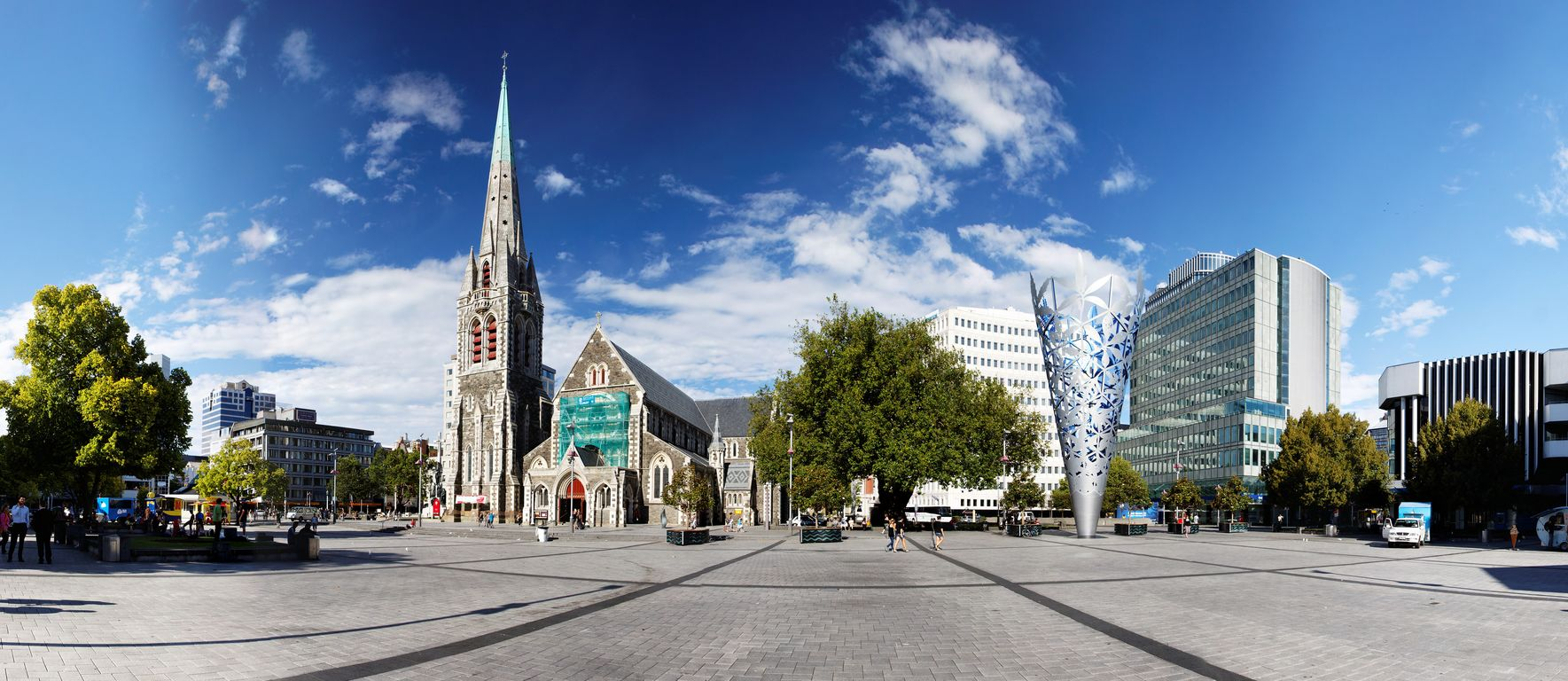
Christchurch Cathedral Square panorama from January 2010

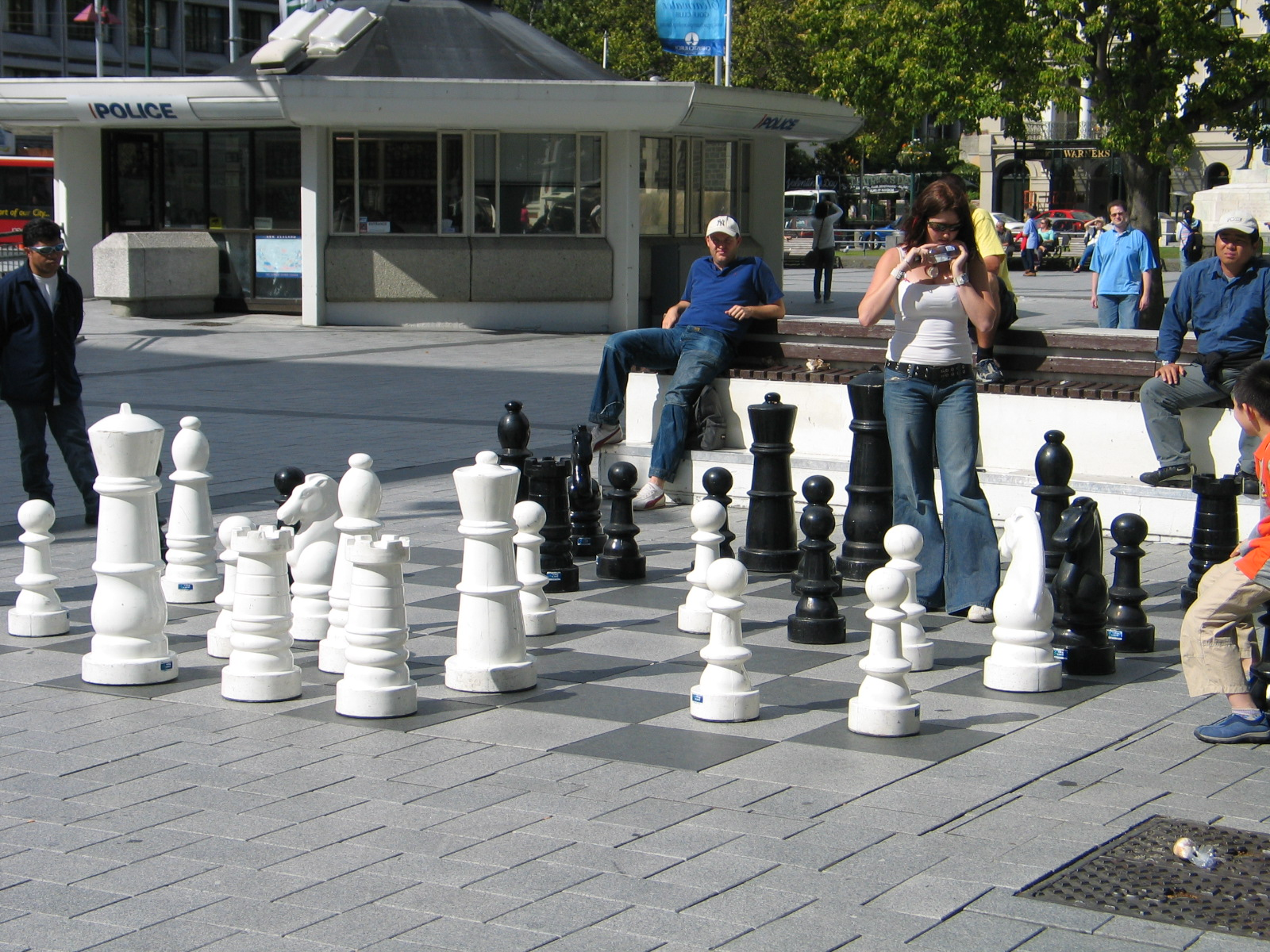
Chess in Cathedral Square

== See also ==
- Aotea Square, Auckland
- Te Ngākau Civic Square, Wellington
- The Octagon, Dunedin
