= Riverside Market =

Food hall in Christchurch, New Zealand

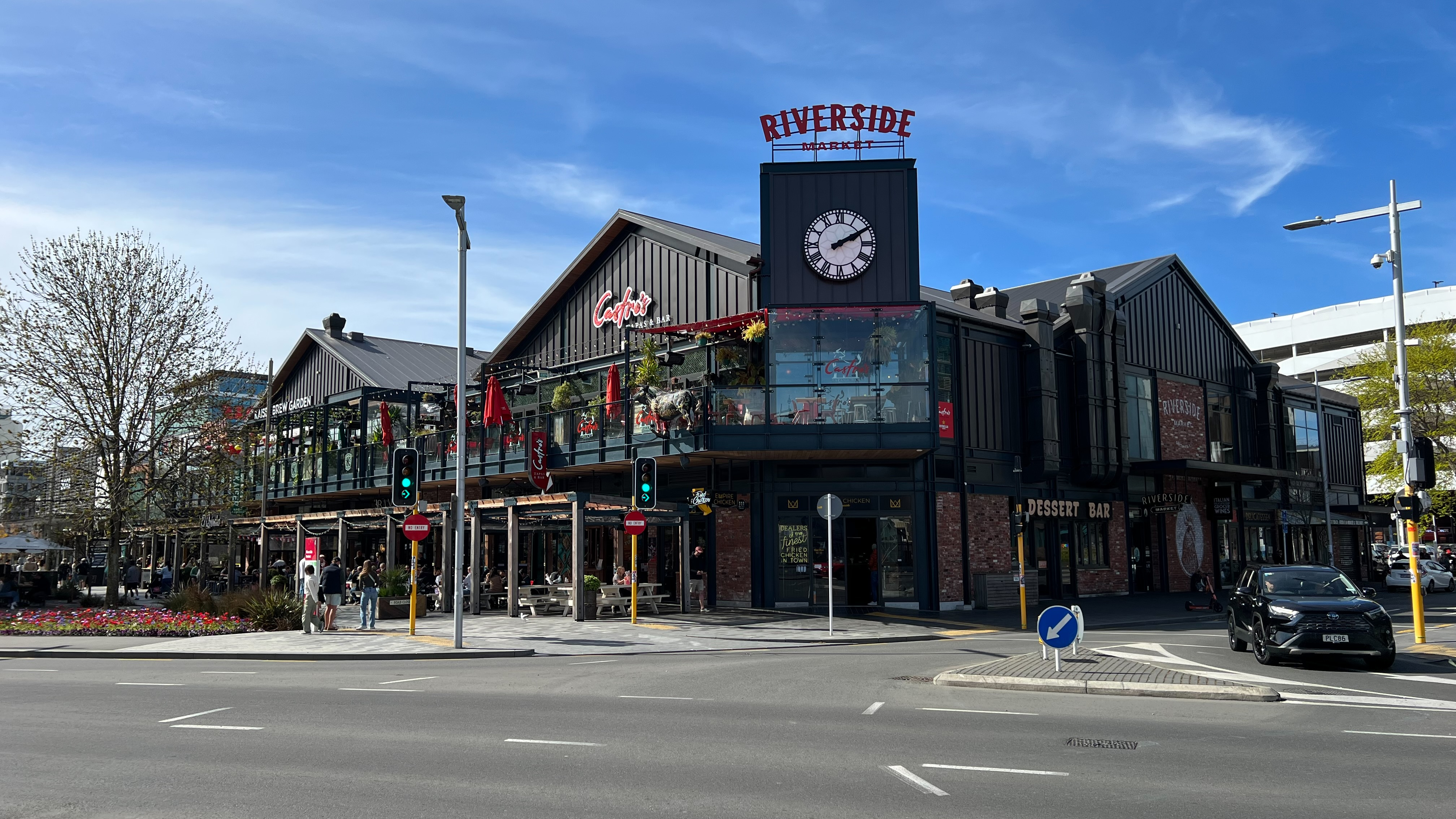
- Riverside Market as seen from the corner of Lichfield Street and Oxford Terrace
- Interactive map of the Riverside Market area

General information
- Type: Food hall
- Location: 96 Oxford Terrace, Christchurch, New Zealand
- Coordinates: 43.53394°S 172.63399°E
- Opened: September 28, 2019; 6 years ago

Website
- riverside.nz

Riverside Market is a food hall on Oxford Terrace in the Christchurch Central City, New Zealand.

== History ==
Riverside Market opened on 28 September 2019. The market was founded by Mike Percasky, Kris Inglis and Richard Peebles, who modelled the design on food markets in Melbourne and Copenhagen. They had previously had success with a similar location in Christchurch, called the Little High Eatery. Riverside Market was built on a site adjacent to the City Mall that was cleared after the 2010 Christchurch earthquake, and subsequently hosted the Re:START container mall. The developers purchased the land from crown rebuild agency Ōtakaro for NZ$11.5 million. The development of the site cost NZ$80 million.

As of 2024, Riverside Market hosts about 100 small businesses and receives 10,000 visitors a day.

== Design and tenancy ==
The interior design of the market incorporates mostly natural materials, including wood recycled from the wharf at Lyttelton. Outdoor seating is provided on Oxford Terrace for customers to eat at. An open-plan design on the first floor allows for a view down to the market below. While the ground floor is mostly market stalls, the first floor hosts more conventional bars and restaurants. The upstairs "cantina" area provides a view down onto the market below.
