= Johnson's Grocers =

Store in Christchurch, New Zealand, 1922–2016

Johnson's Grocers was a boutique grocery store in Christchurch, New Zealand. The store originally opened in 1922 as Leigh and Co's grocery, which relocated there from other premises.^{1} In 1949 the store was purchased by Stan Johnson and later renamed to Johnson's Grocers. His son Colin began working at the store in 1957, and they worked there together until Stan's retirement in the 90s, after which Colin continued operating the store alone.

The store retained its original early-20th century layout throughout its life, and the staff continued to wear the traditional white grocers' aprons. It mostly sold foodstuffs imported from the United Kingdom, including lollies and haggis. The high shelves required a ladder to access, and the shop created the feeling of stepping back in time.

The store building at 787 Colombo Street was damaged in the 2011 Christchurch earthquakes and was forced to close. It relocated to the re:START mall in 2012. Johnson retired in 2016 and closed the store, citing uncertainty over the future of the temporary mall as a reason for the decision.

In 2026, a mural of the store was painted by Guy Ellis, aka Dcypher, just around the corner from the original Colombo Street location, opposite the Christchurch Town Hall. The mural had to be repainted after it was noticed the building depicted was actually a Melbourne grocery store with the same name. The artist explained the mistake had occurred in the design process. The mural continued to show an incorrect establishment date of 1911, when in fact the store originally opened in 1922.

== Notes ==
- ^1 Stuff has repeatedly published that the store was opened in 1911, which is incorrect. The store premises at 787 Colombo Street was auctioned to Leigh and Co in 1922. It was originally a medical herbalist dispensary.
