= City Mall, Christchurch =

Street in Christchurch Central City, New Zealand

City Mall
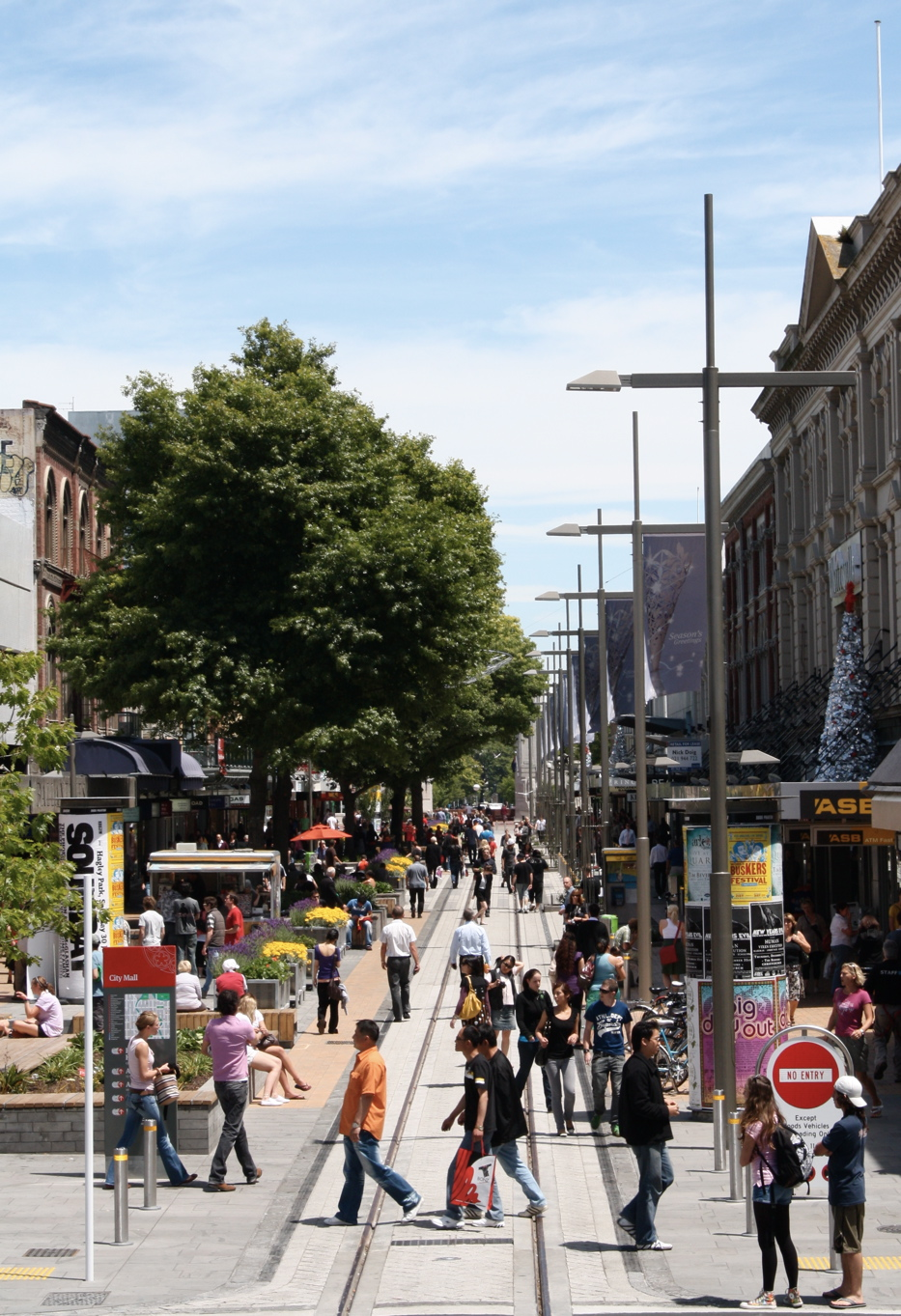
- The Cashel Street part of City Mall looking west as seen from Colombo Street in 2009
- Interactive map of City Mall
- Former names: Cashel Street and High Street
- Maintained by: Christchurch City Council
- Width: 20 m
- Location: Christchurch Central City
- Coordinates: 43°31′57.28″S 172°38′14.69″E

Construction
- Construction start: 1982
- Inauguration: 7 August 1982

City Mall is the main pedestrian mall in the central city of Christchurch, New Zealand, comprising two sections of Cashel Street plus the Bridge of Remembrance and one section of High Street. It is also known colloquially as Cashel Mall. The Bridge of Remembrance was pedestrianised in 1976. The main mall was closed to traffic on 11 January 1982 and formally reopened as a pedestrian mall on 7 August, but it was not until 1992 that the entire mall was paved. The mall was redeveloped between 2006 and 2009, and track was installed for an expansion of the heritage tram network.

The September 2010 Canterbury earthquake caused damage to some buildings, but the Boxing Day aftershock, directly underneath the city, caused even more damage, including building failures. The 6.3 magnitude February 2011 Christchurch earthquake devastated the mall; the façades of many buildings collapsed and there were several fatalities. The centre of the city was subsequently closed to allow demolition work to proceed. Structures affected included most of the heritage buildings in the mall that are or were registered by Heritage New Zealand. Part of City Mall, the section of Cashel Street from Oxford Terrace to Colombo Street, was the first part of the central city to open again, on Saturday, 29 October 2011, marked by a ceremony at which the Prime Minister John Key officiated.

== Urban context ==
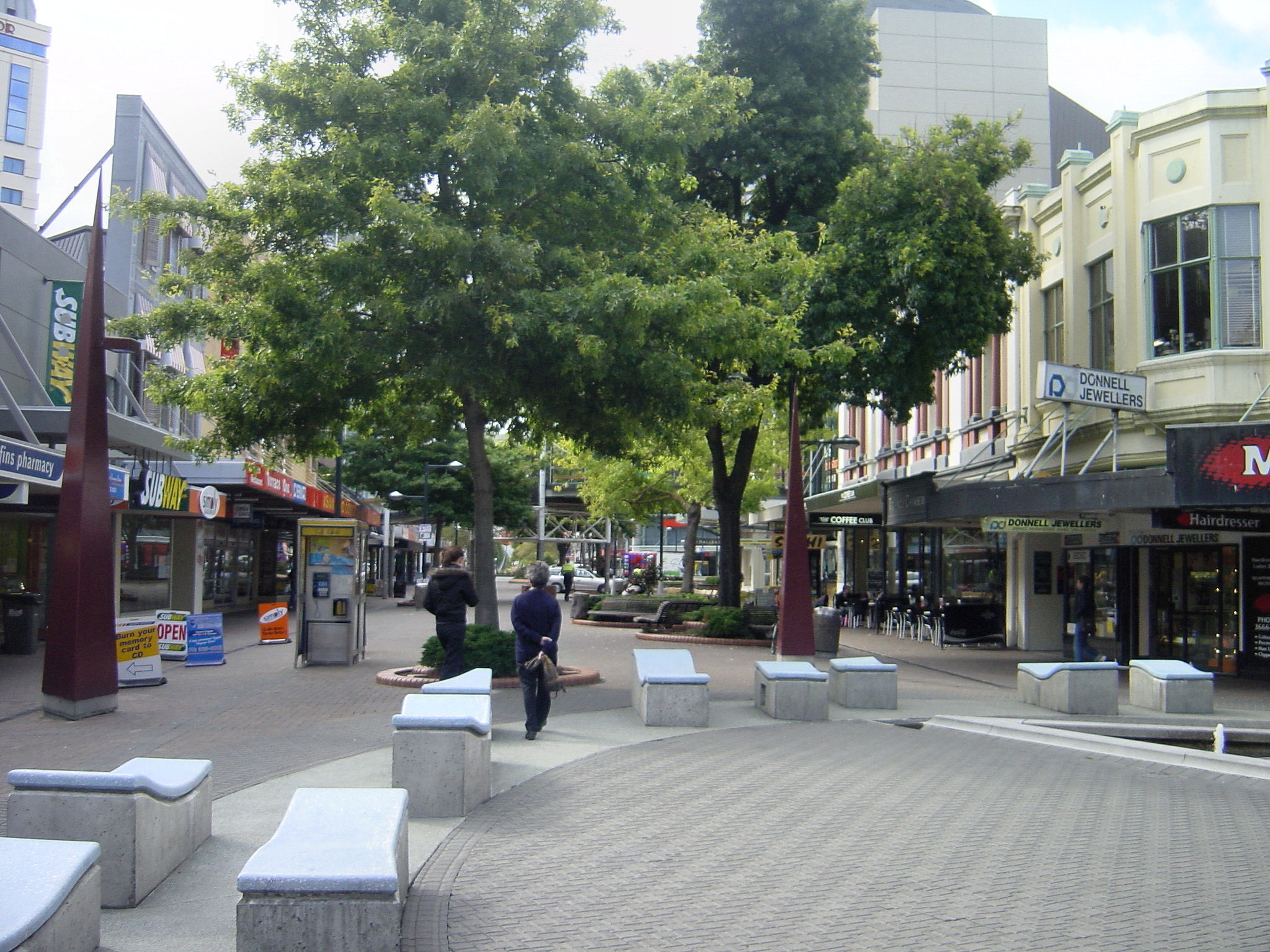
Looking down High Street from its intersection with Colombo and Hereford Streets, with part of the former Stewart Fountain in the foreground (2007)

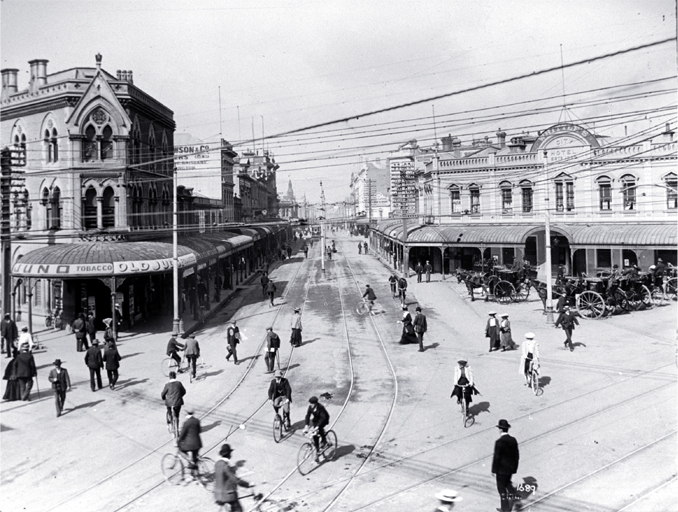
Looking down High Street from its intersection with Colombo and Hereford Streets (c. 1910)

City Mall is made up of Cashel Street between Cambridge Terrace up to its intersection with High Street and High Street from Cashel Street to its intersection with Hereford and Colombo Streets.

Cashel Street runs east–west. The portion of Cashel Street that makes up City Mall is approximately 400 metres (1,300 ft) long. The street is named after the bishopric of Cashel. At the time of naming by surveyor Edward Jollie and Joseph Thomas, the bishop was Robert Daly, an uncle of John Robert Godley, who is considered to be the founder of Canterbury.

High Street is one of the two diagonal streets in the central city, running from north-west to south-east. The portion of High Street that makes up City Mall is approximately 150 metres (490 ft) long. It was initially called Sumner Road, as it connected to the village (and later suburb) of Sumner. It was renamed Lower High Street, and then just High Street, probably after The High in Oxford.

== History ==
The first traffic lights in the South Island were installed at the intersection of Cashel and Colombo Streets. The traffic lights, which were first tested on the evening of 5 November 1930, replaced officers on point duty. (Note: In the book Christchurch chronology: a history of settlement, the incorrect installation date of December 1930 is given.)

The Canterbury/Westland Branch of the New Zealand Institute of Valuers began biannual pedestrian counts in central Christchurch in 1957. The count takes place one hour in the morning and afternoon, respectively (10:30h to 11:30h and 14:30h to 15:30h). While dozens of sites are counted, only seven of the locations have been included in the count since the work began in the 1950s. There is a gradual but steady decline visible in pedestrian numbers. The seven sites had 30,000 pedestrians in 1957, and that had reduced to 18,000 by the 1981 count. The establishment of City Mall saw the numbers increase to 25,000 again, but the overall downward trend continued after that, albeit starting at the higher level of the 1983 count.

=== Original scheme ===
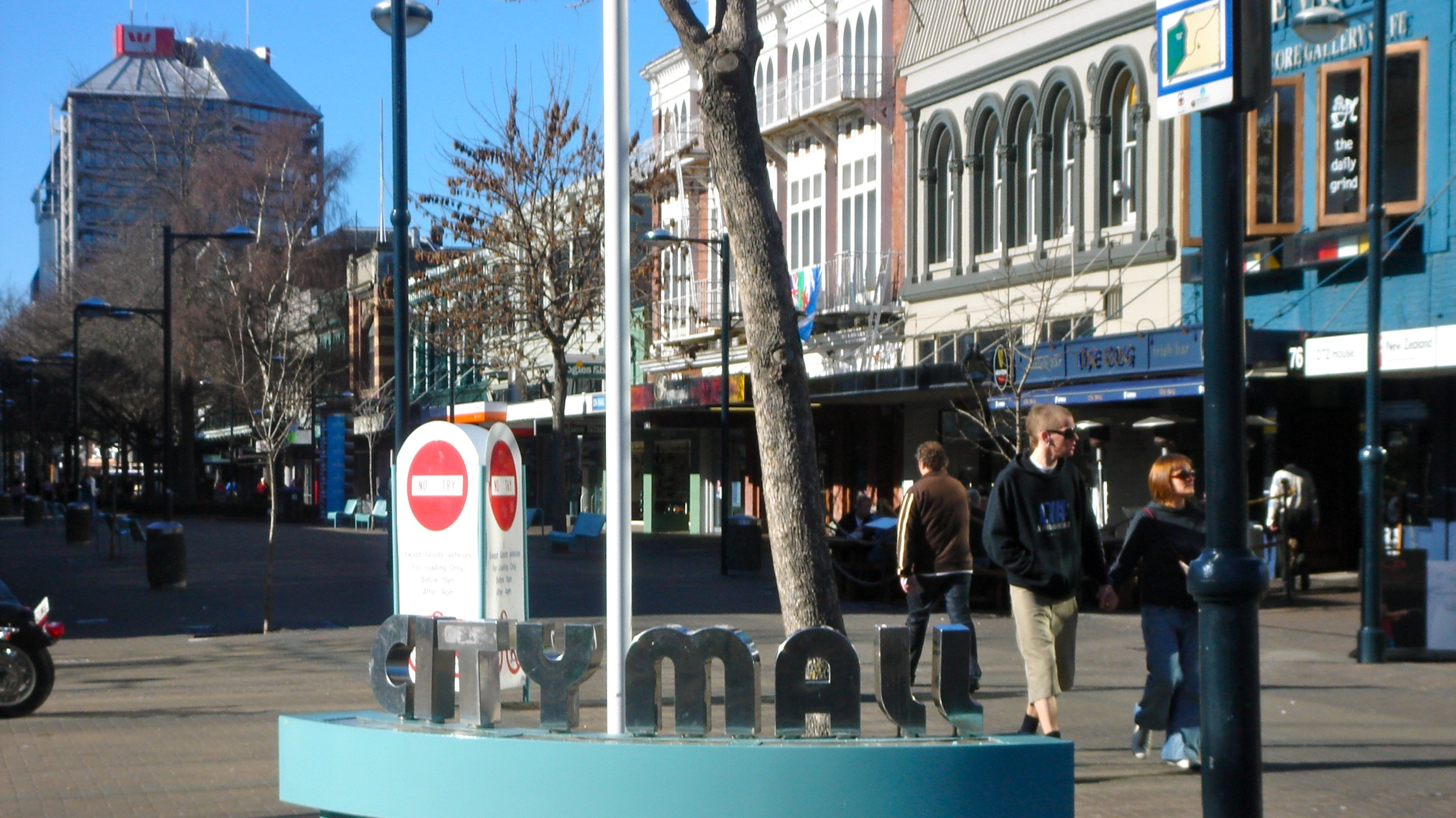
Cashel Street as seen from Oxford Terrace in 2005

The concept of a pedestrian mall in Cashel and High Streets was first developed in the 1965 central city redevelopment study. In the same year, there were proposals in Wellington to form a pedestrian mall in Cuba Street. The Christchurch concept was included in the 1968 District Scheme (a predecessor of the Christchurch City Plan). A year later, Cuba Mall was established in Wellington, the success of which gave other cities the confidence to advance their plans for pedestrianising streets. In 1976, the Bridge of Remembrance was closed to traffic, reserving the short Cashel Street link between Oxford and Cambridge Terraces over the Avon River / Ōtākaro for pedestrians. The plans for City Mall were confirmed in the 1979 review of the District Scheme. A concept design by the City Architect was adopted by Christchurch City Council, the Cashel Street Businessmen's Association and the High Street Businessmen's Association in 1981.

On 11 January 1982, the sections of Cashel and High Street that form the mall were closed to traffic. Mayor Hamish Hay opened the NZ$0.5m City Mall project on 7 August 1982. It took ten years and three separate project stages before the whole area was paved; tree planters and additional seating were installed as part of the final project stage in the early 1990s. Mayor Vicki Buck opened the third and final stage on 4 December 1992.

In 1998, Christchurch City Council redeveloped the adjacent section of Oxford Terrace, which became known as The Strip, and narrowed the road to a one-way street. It was the prime night-time entertainment hub in Christchurch over the next decade, until increasing competition from newer developments took its toll. Another pedestrian mall in Christchurch inspired by City Mall was New Regent Street, which was closed to traffic in 1994 in preparation for the reintroduction of the Christchurch tram.

=== 2007–2009 redevelopment ===
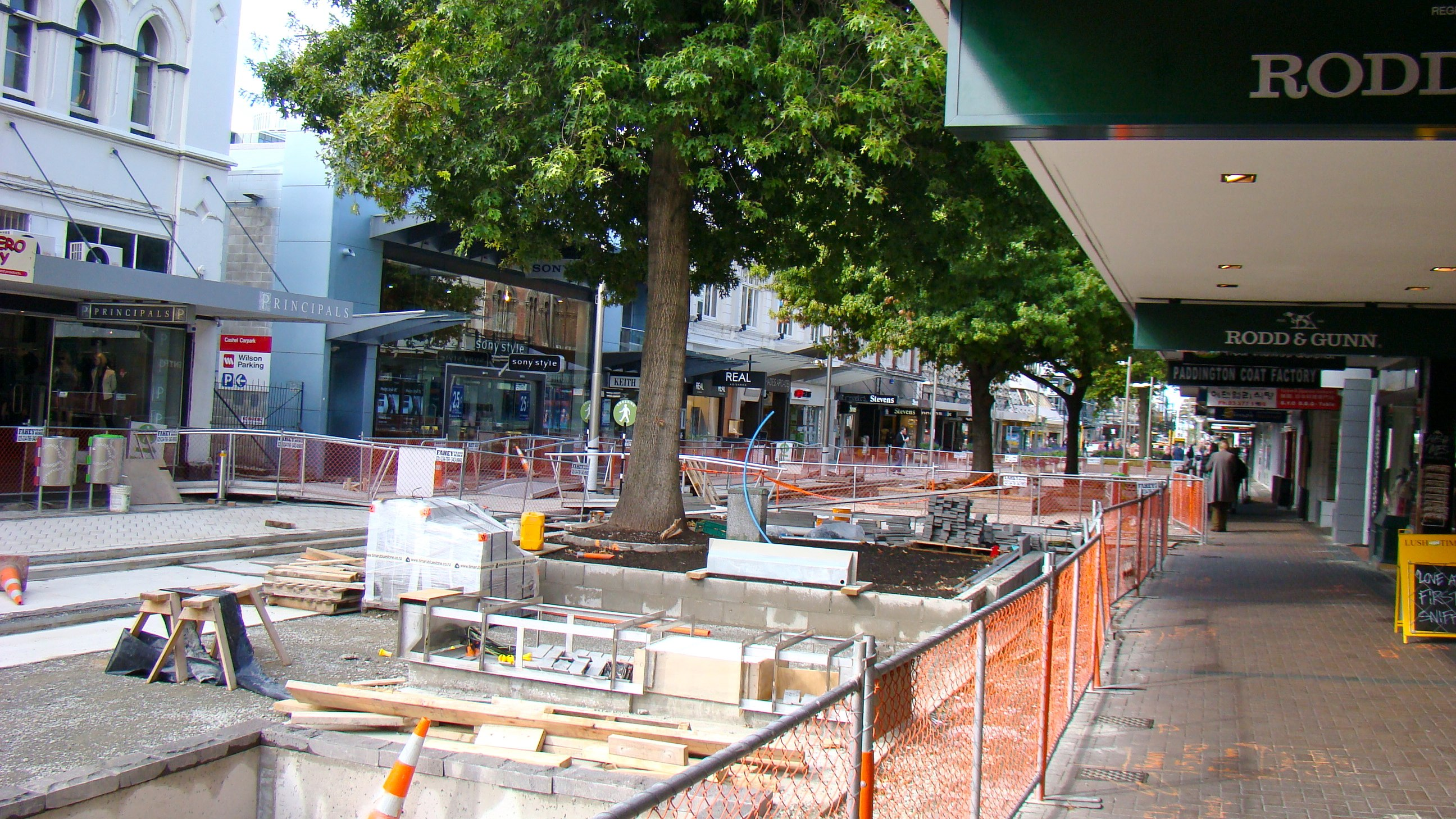
Redevelopment of City Mall in March 2009 (the building on the left is 93 Cashel Street)

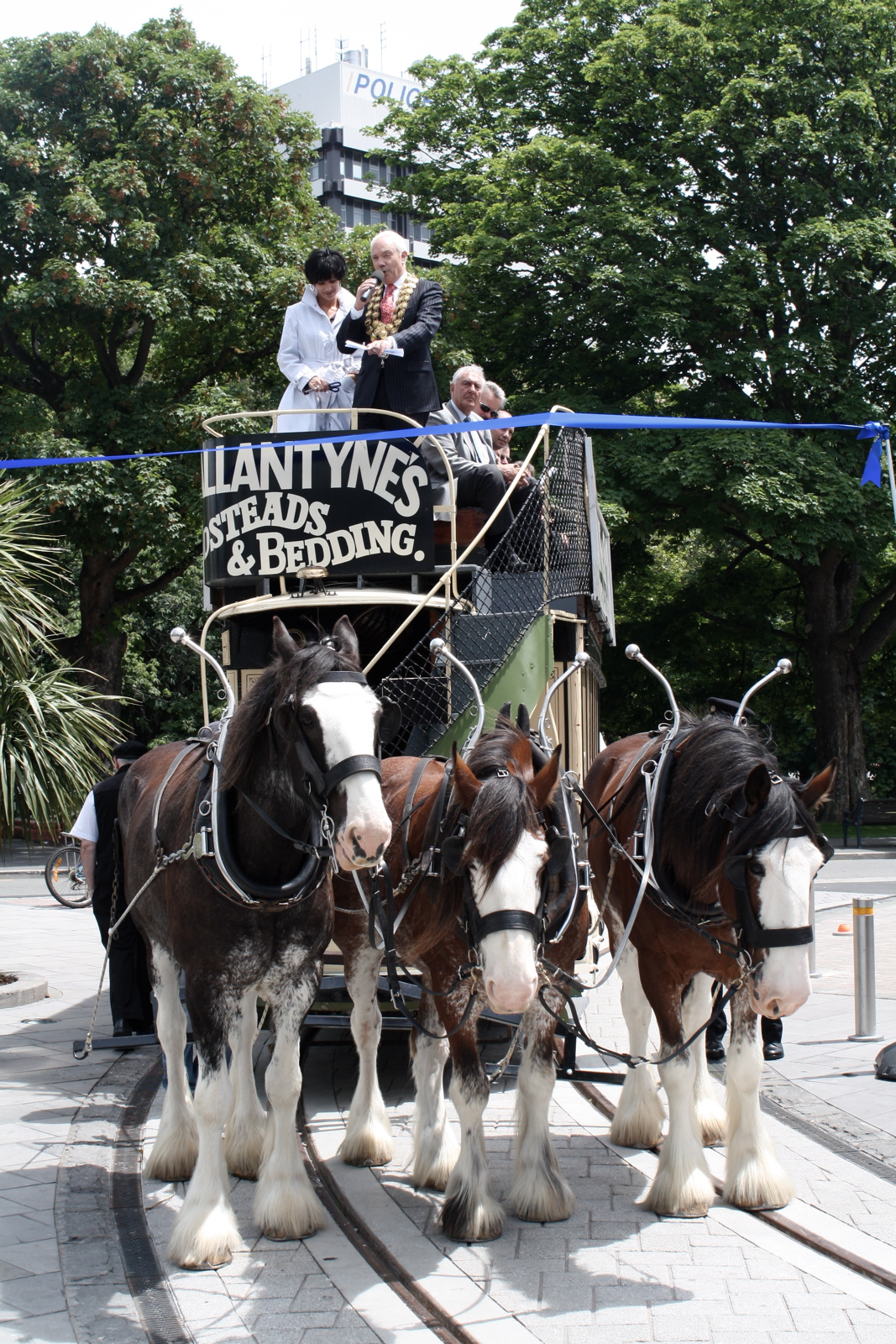
Mayor Bob Parker and the mayoress opening the redeveloped City Mall

During 2006, the public were invited to comment on the proposed redevelopment plans for City Mall. The Council approved the final proposals in December 2006 and agreed an implementation plan, for which NZ$10.5 million had been budgeted, but on which NZ$14 million was spent. An alliance contract was entered into between Christchurch City Council as the client, Isthmus Group as the designer, and Downer EDI Works as the contractor. Mayor Garry Moore and Central City Business Association chairman Antony Gough started the work with a symbolic lifting of the first brick on 10 August 2007.

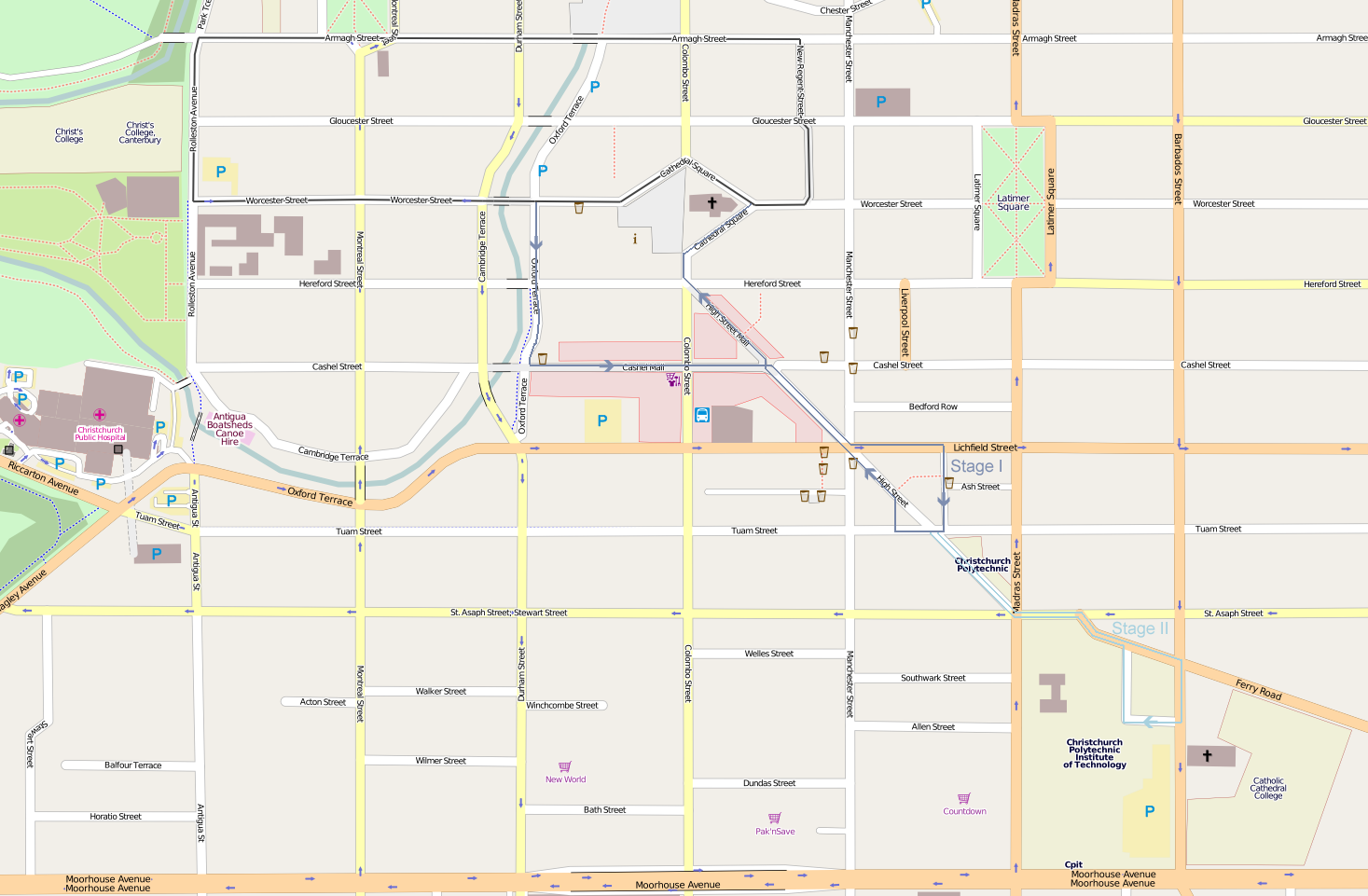
Christchurch heritage tramway circuit with extensions through City Mall

A separate project that affected the City Mall redevelopment was the extension of the heritage tramway. From the previous circuit on Worcester Street, the extension would see the trams turn left into Oxford Terrace (The Strip), and then left into the Cashel Street part of City Mall. At the intersection with High Street, trams would turn south-east towards Lichfield Street. On the return journey, trams would travel north-west along High Street, including the City Mall part of it. The $10.8 million project, to be funded from grants and from borrowing, was due to be completed in the 2013/14 financial year.

The redevelopment was not without controversy. Young people protested strongly about the demolition of Hack Circle on the corner of Cashel and High Streets, as it was seen as an attempt to push them out of City Mall. Antony Gough, owner of several properties along The Strip, was an advocate of stronger security for City Mall, particularly the Hack Circle, telling The Press that the people who associate there "are just very scary". Police arrested several young people during the mall redevelopment, including 13 teenagers when the demolition of Stewart Fountain began.

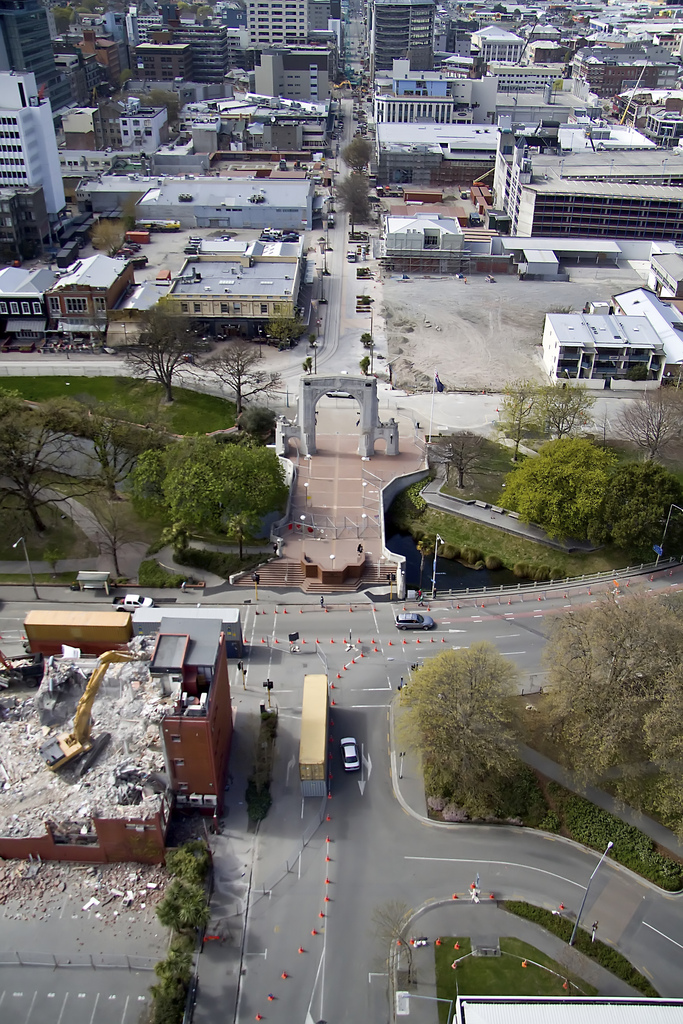
Aerial view of Cashel Street looking east on 29 September 2011, with the Bridge of Remembrance in the centre of the photo and the temporary container mall under construction

The second Stewart Fountain, replacing an earlier fountain, was built in 1998 at a cost of NZ$700,000, with a NZ$200,000 contribution by industrialist Sir Robertson Stewart and decorated with hundreds of tiles painted by Christchurch schoolchildren. Demolition of the fountain began on 13 August 2007 and 13 young people were arrested in the resulting demonstration; Sir Robertson Stewart had died that morning. Christchurch City Council formally named the reserve Stewart Plaza in 2008. Stewart's bequest part-funded the replacement sculpture, "Flour Power", on the condition that the installation be permanent, and that the land be known as Stewart Plaza.

Another controversial issue was the slow road through High Street. Despite opposition from 70% of those who had taken part in the public consultation, the Council confirmed that the slow road would go ahead. The upgraded City Mall was opened by mayor Bob Parker on 18 December 2009.

=== 2010 and 2011 earthquakes ===
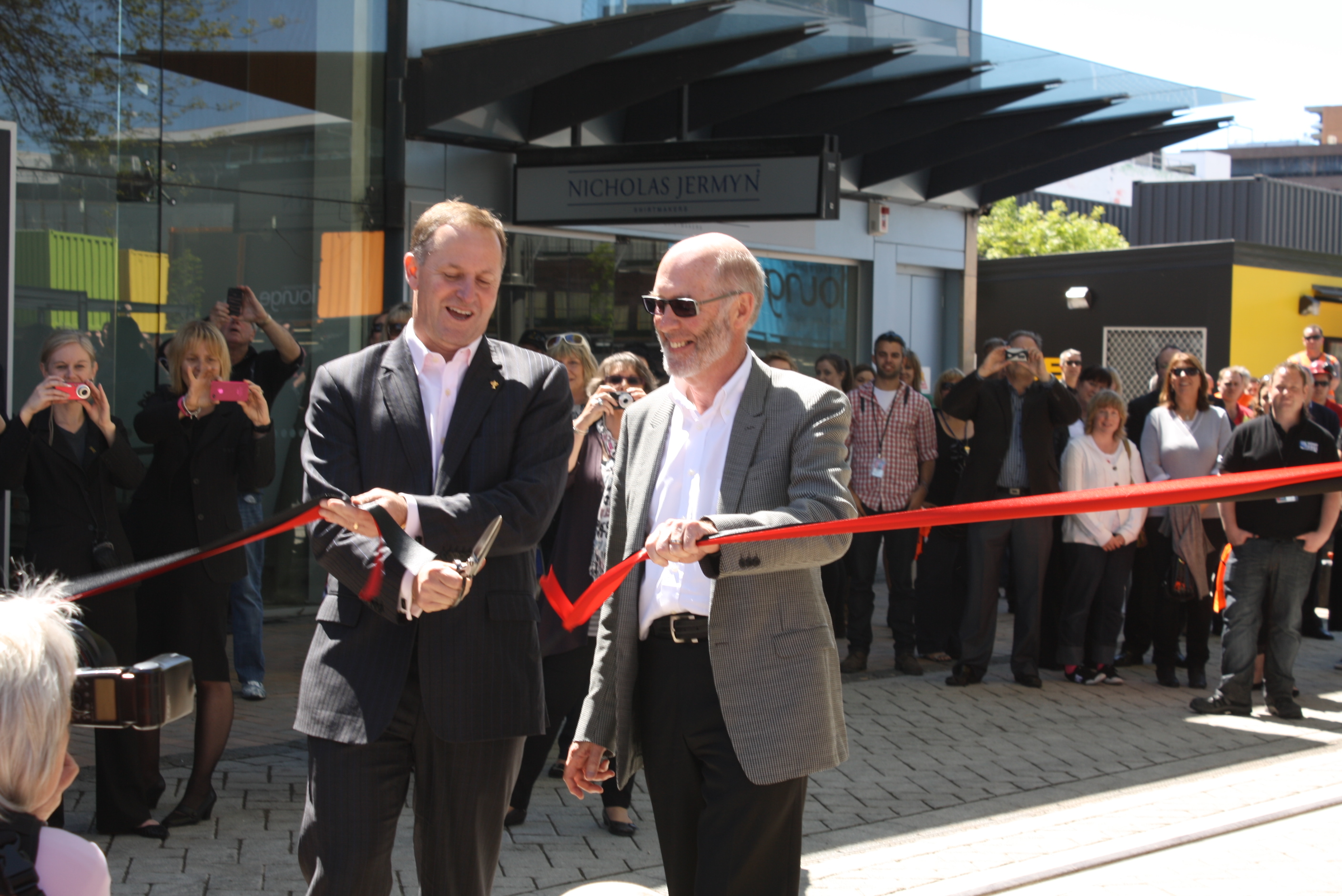
John Key and Re:START chairman John Suckling cutting the ribbon

The central city was closed for a week after the 7.1 magnitude earthquake on 4 September 2010; some buildings were damaged, including parapets collapsing. The central city experienced peak ground acceleration (i.e. earthquake intensity) of between 15% and 20% of Earth's gravity. Ongoing aftershocks and cracked building façades dented confidence in the central city. Retailers in the City Mall retailers had put an effort into strongly promoting the traditional Boxing Day sales in 2010, and there was "brisk trade" until an aftershock at 10.30 am. Although only a 4.9 magnitude earthquake, it occurred directly beneath the central city and the resulting peak ground acceleration ranged from 22% of gravity at ChristChurch Cathedral and 48% at Christchurch Botanic Gardens. The wall of the former Zetland Hotel collapsed and crashed through the roof of a restaurant at 94 Cashel Street; anybody standing in the restaurant's bar area would likely have been killed, but it was still closed that morning.

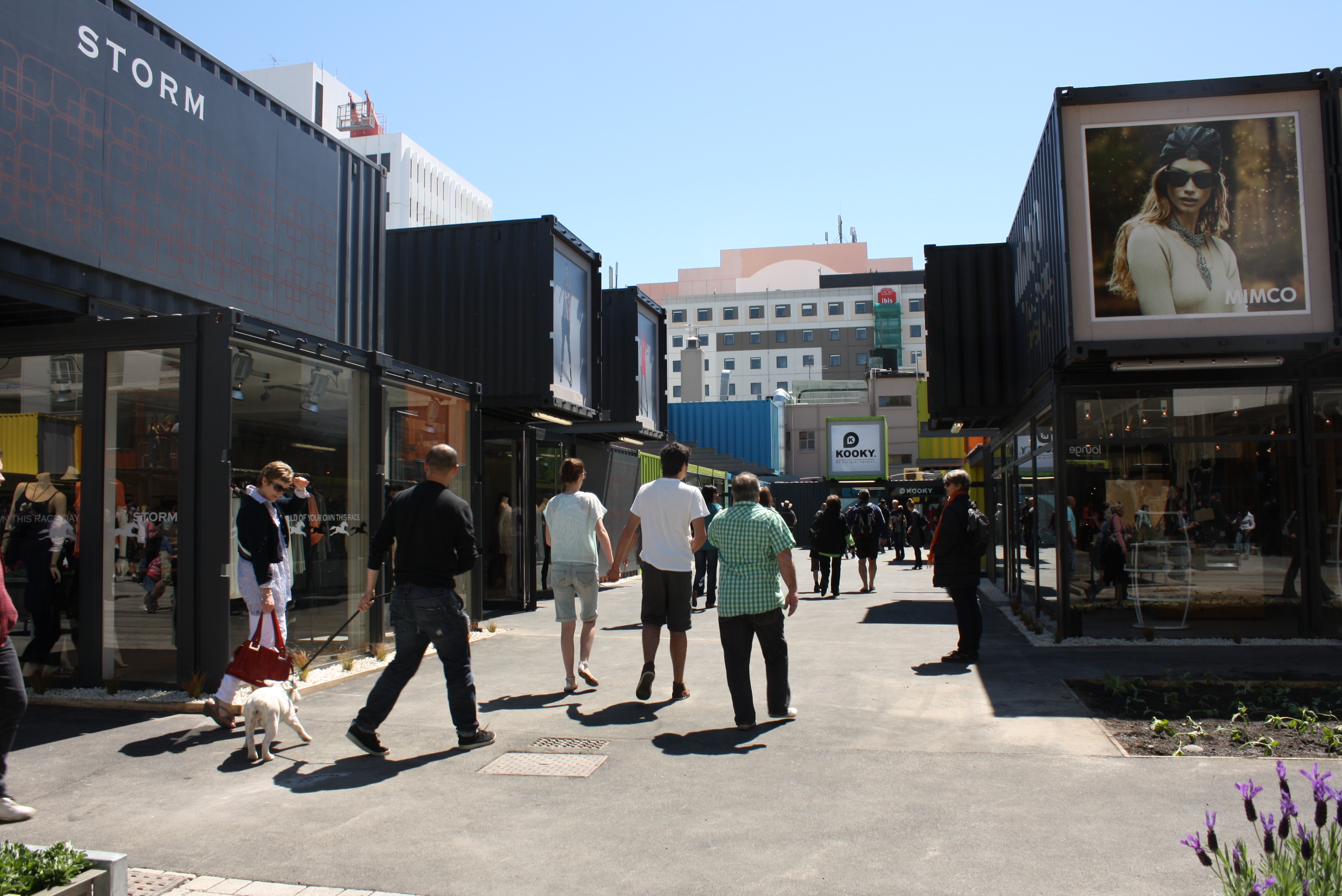
City Mall on re-opening day

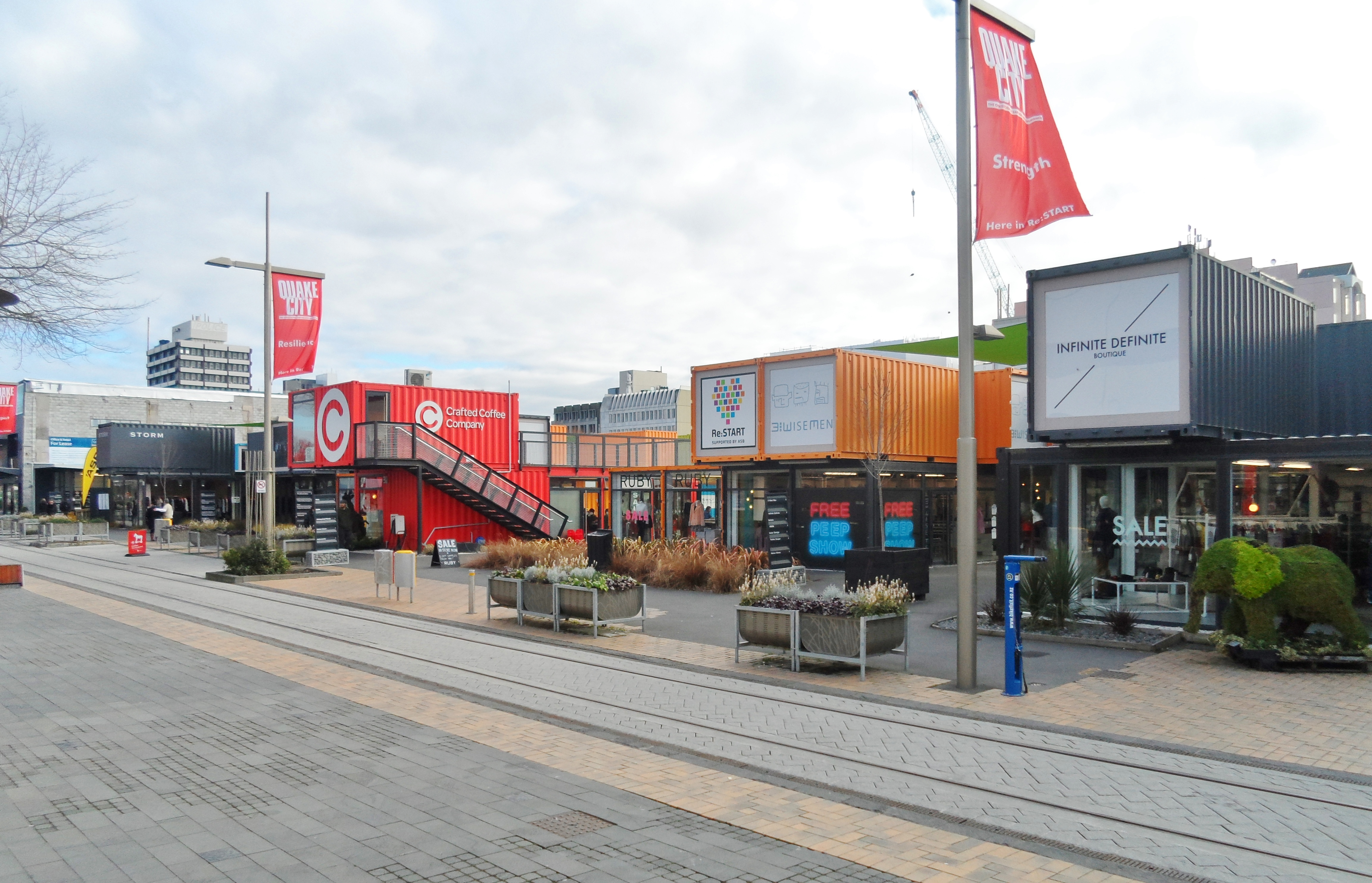
Re:START City Mall

Damage caused by the 22 February 2011 Christchurch earthquake was much more severe. Although its 6.3 magnitude was lower than the September 2010 event, it was much closer to the central city and caused the loss of many buildings. The peak ground acceleration reached 180% of gravity in the city. Four people died in Cashel Street in the section between Oxford Terrace and Colombo Street, and one person died in the High Street part of City Mall, all of them killed by falling masonry. The central city was cordoned off on 22 February while demolitions were underway.

In April 2011, it was announced that part of Cashel Street was to reopen on 29 October 2011. Temporary shops made from shipping containers were fitted out as retail premises, accommodating 27 shops known as Re:START. Ballantynes, Christchurch's remaining department store, also reopened and is the retail anchor. Prime Minister John Key officiated at the opening ceremony.

Organisers initially claimed that it was the world's first pop-up mall, but there were already container malls in other places, for example Cholula (Mexico) and Bishkek (Kyrgyzstan). Organisers of the Christchurch mall project were threatened with legal action by organisers of a similar project in London (Boxpark) that was yet to open.

The Canterbury Earthquake Recovery Authority completed the removal of the Red Zone cordon, including removing the remaining cordon around City Mall, in June 2013.

== Registered heritage buildings ==
City Mall contains or contained seven structures that are or were registered as historic places by Heritage New Zealand. The following table lists these buildings starting at the Colombo / Hereford / High intersection and proceeding down High Street and then along Cashel Street:

Photo	Name	Category	Status	Address	Description
	Fisher's Building	I	Demolished	280 High Street	Commercial building designed by William Armson
	D.I.C. Building	II	Demolished	154–158 Cashel Street	Former department store building from 1909
	Beaths Department Store Building	II	Still standing	682–690 Colombo Street; corner Cashel Street	Part of the Bus Exchange as of 2011
	Guthrey Centre	I	Demolished	124–126 Cashel Street	Commercial building from ca. 1881 designed by William Armson
	Twentymen & Cousins Store	II	Demolished	93 Cashel Street	Commercial building from 1882
	Zetland Hotel	II	Demolished	88–92 Cashel Street	Former hotel from 1903; the Last Train to India restaurant is in the low rise on the left
	Bridge of Remembrance	I	Repairs completed April 2016	Between Oxford and Cambridge Terraces	World War I war memorial
