= Central City Red Zone =

Former public exclusion zone in Christchurch, New Zealand

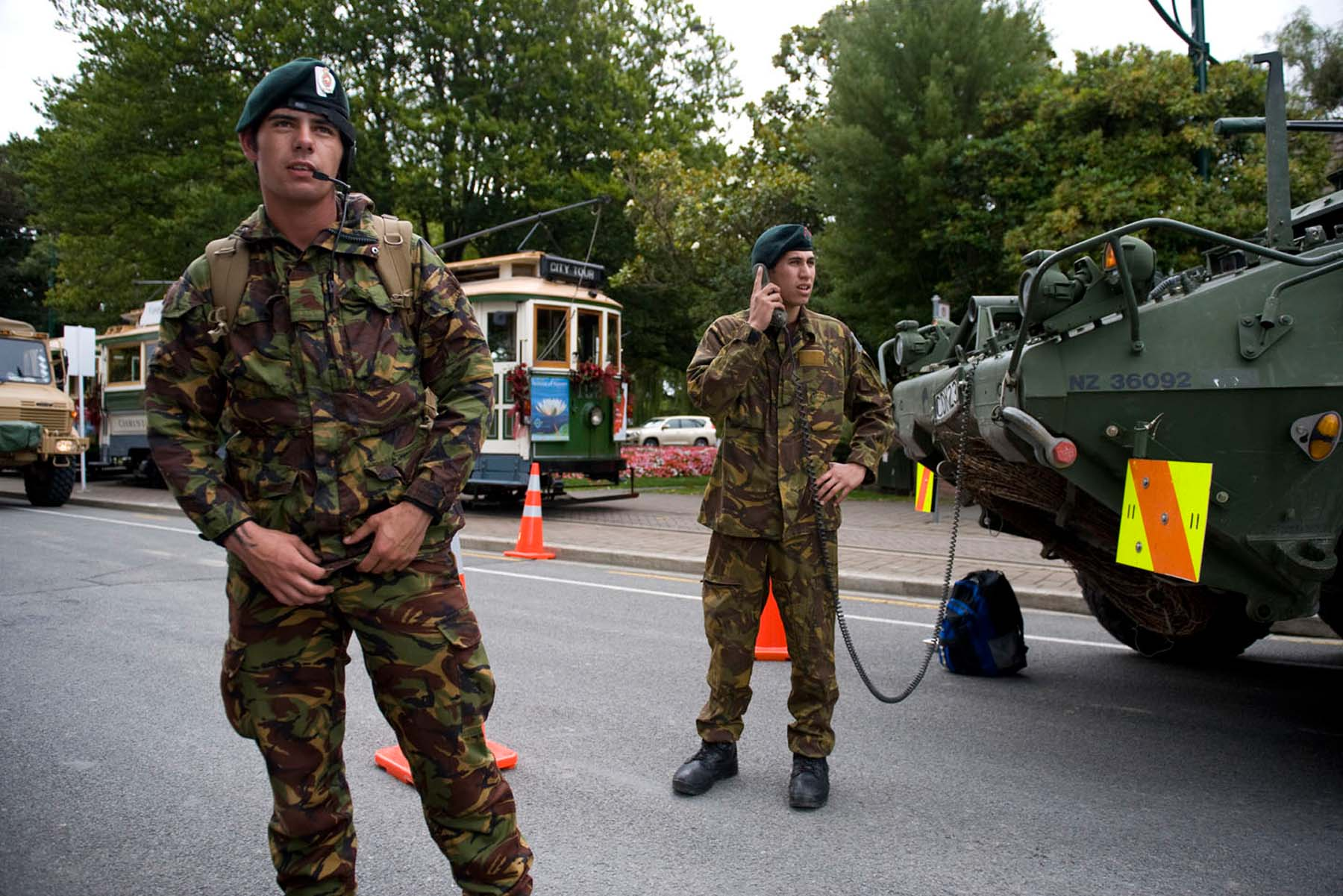
New Zealand Army soldiers manning the red zone cordon on 23 February 2011 at the Hagley Park end of Armagh Street

The Central City Red Zone, also known as the CBD Red Zone, was a public exclusion zone in the Christchurch Central City implemented after the 22 February 2011 Christchurch earthquake. After February 2013, it was officially renamed the CBD Rebuild Zone by government agencies, but remained known as the Red Zone. It gradually shrank in size and the last cordons were removed on 30 June 2013, 859 days after the earthquake.

== Background ==
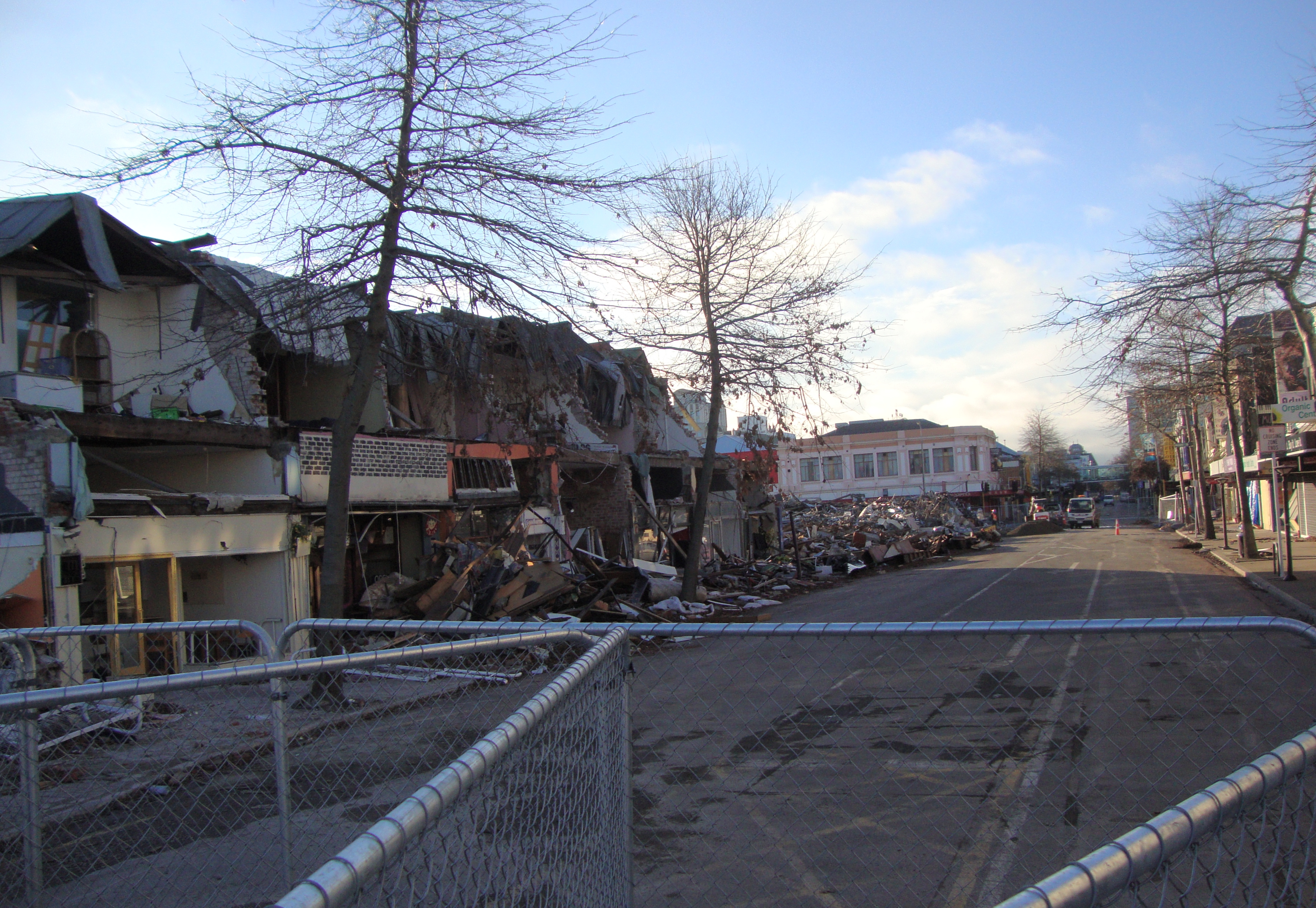
Colombo Street in May 2011; 15 people died in this section, including 8 on buses hit by falling façades

=== February 2011 earthquake ===
The February 2011 earthquake caused widespread damage across Christchurch, especially in the central city and eastern suburbs, with damage exacerbated by buildings and infrastructure already being weakened by the 4 September 2010 earthquake and its aftershocks. The earthquake, which struck at lunchtime on a weekday, caused devastation in the central city, with two large office buildings having collapsed (the CTV Building and the PGC Building), many historic building façades had collapsed into the streets, two buses were crushed by falling façades in Colombo Street, and many people in City Mall were trapped by fallen masonry. A total of 185 people died in the February earthquake, 169 died in the central zone alone: 115 in the CTV building, 18 at the PGC Building, 8 on buses in Colombo Street and 28 others in various CBD locations.

Authorities cleared the central city of people, established a cordon on the day of the earthquake and denied access. The day after the earthquake, the New Zealand Government declared a state of national emergency, which stayed in force until 30 April 2011.

=== Colour confusion ===
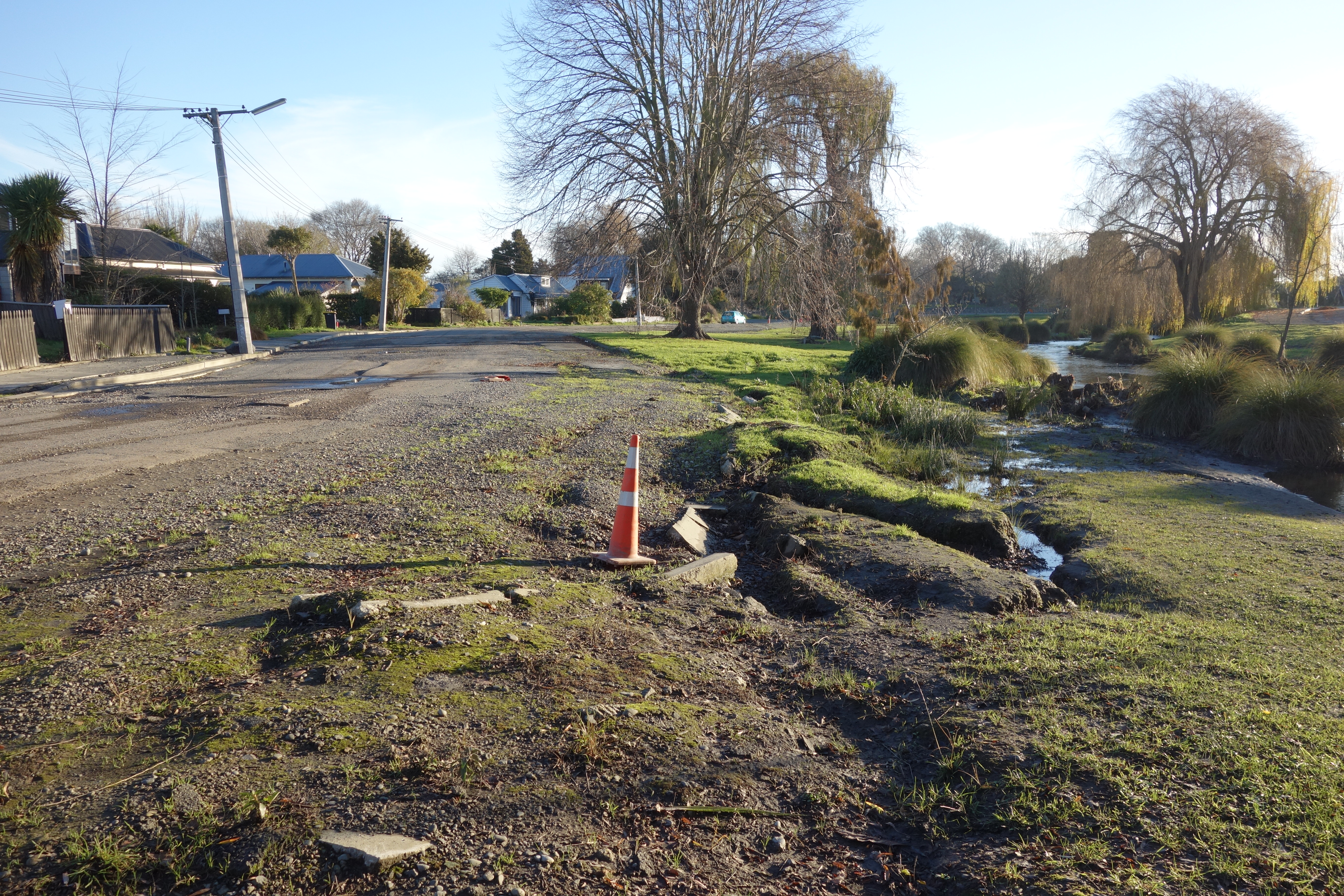
Oxford Terrace in the Avon Loop, an area that was initially in the Central City Red Zone and later became part of the residential red zone

Post-Christchurch had a confusing colour-coding applied, with the same colour meaning different things in different areas. The Central City Red Zone is not to be confused with the residential red zone. In the central city, it described the area that was cordoned off after the earthquake. In the eastern suburbs, the colour red refers to land that is subject to liquefaction or the related effect of lateral spreading and that is deemed uneconomic to repair; with over 7,000 properties being purchased by The Crown under what has been called a voluntary yet coercive scheme – while residents were free to refuse the Government's buyout of their homes, the Government cautioned that remaining in place would entail a lack of insurance, infrastructure, and city services. In the Port Hills, red zoning refers to land where it is not economic to protect buildings that are at risk from rockfall, or land that is unstable due to its proximity to cliffs, with The Crown offering to buy the land. 510 properties are zoned red in the Port Hills.

As explained below, the Central City Red Zone was further divided, with an outer orange zone accessible to residents. In the eastern suburbs, the orange zone was that land that had yet to be assessed and zoned (either green, blue, or red). There was no orange zone in the Port Hills, though, and land that had yet to be classified was zoned white. A white zone also applied in the central city initially, as geotechnical assessments were not carried out there for many months.

The Avon Loop, which is located in the central city, further adds to the colour confusion. Until 13 March 2011, the Avon Loop was in the orange zone of the Central City Red Zone. When the residential land zoning was first announced in June 2011, the Avon Loop was zoned orange. Much of the Avon Loop was eventually zoned red, and this is the only land in the central city that was initially in the Central City Red Zone which later became part of the Residential Red Zone.

== Cordon ==
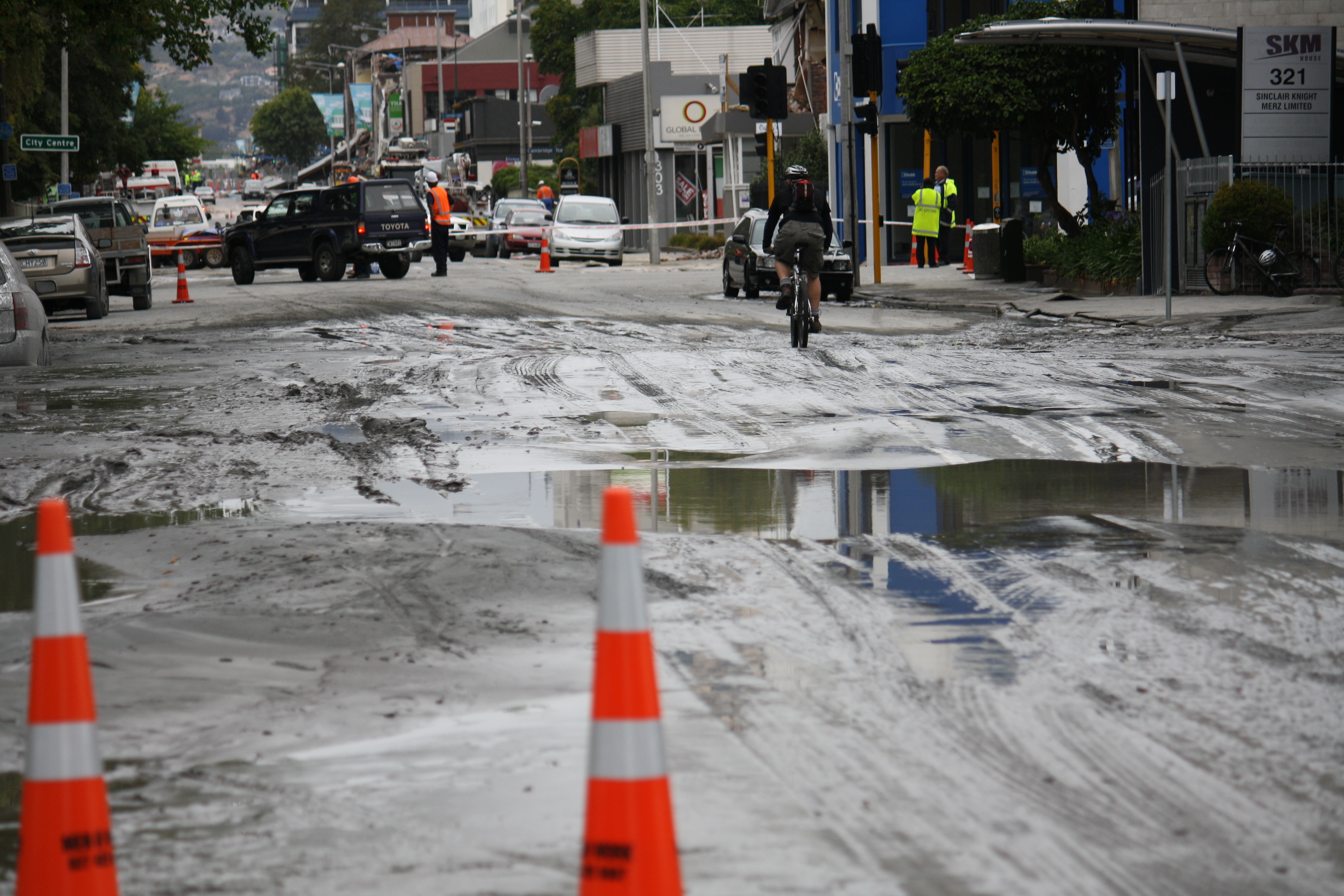
Manchester Street on the day of the earthquake

An initial cordon was established by Police and the New Zealand Army around the perimeter along the central city along Bealey Avenue, Fitzgerald Avenue, Moorhouse Avenue, Antigua Street, Rolleston Avenue, and Park Terrace. Within days, cordon checkpoints were also manned by Australian Police (mostly New South Wales Police Force and Australian Federal Police) and Singapore Armed Forces.

The CBD fringe is in large areas of residential nature, so the initial cordon saw many residents within the restricted area. At the last census in 2006, some 7,600 people lived within the three census zones (Avon Loop, Cathedral Square, and Hagley Park) that make up the central city. A triangular area defined by Antigua Street, Hagley Avenue, and Moorhouse Avenue in the south-west of the central city was outside of the cordon. Not much of that area is residential, though, as large areas are occupied by Christchurch Hospital, Hagley Community College, and many industrial uses. Hence, some 7,000 residents were initially affected by the red zone. The cordoned area was thus further subdivided, with an outer orange zone accessible to residents, but no access to the inner red zone other than people authorised first by Civil Defence and later by the Canterbury Earthquake Recovery Authority (CERA). Residents living in the inner red zone did not have access to their buildings and had to find accommodation elsewhere.

A vehicle recovery programme was initiated by Police around 10 March 2011. Cars and bicycles were transferred to a secured compound within Hagley Park, from where vehicle owners could retrieve their vehicles.

On 21 March 2011, about 100 business owners protested at the Art Gallery, the temporary headquarters of Civil Defence, about lack of access to critical business property (e.g. computer servers, merchandise, cash) as well as a lack of communication, with some buildings having been demolished without any prior communication. They demanded to speak to the National Controller of Civil Defence, John Hamilton. When Hamilton would not see them, some of the business owners breached the inner cordon in protest by simply walking past soldiers manning the entrances, but within minutes, Police started arresting the protesters and pushed protesters back outside the inner cordon. The next day, the New Zealand Government issued a press release, with Civil Defence Minister John Carter stating that it was "foolish to breach the cordon around the red zone. People died behind that cordon."

The cordon was officially renamed to the Rebuild Zone in February 2013. The employment of the New Zealand Army finished on 28 June 2013, after the army having served for 858 days. The cordon was removed two days later on 30 June 2013. Many individual buildings are still fenced off, as they are deemed unstable by the authorities; this includes the Anglican Cathedral in Cathedral Square.

Over time, the role of the army personnel at the cordon entry points changed from simply restricting access to become guides to tourists and locals alike, with even locals not knowing their way around any longer as so many landmarks have been demolished.

== Timeline ==
The first time that CERA set a target date for the removal of the red zone cordons was in September 2011, when a 1 April 2012 removal was announced.

A red zone removal by 28 June 2013 was first announced in March 2013; the ultimate removal date was 30 June.

== Public access ==
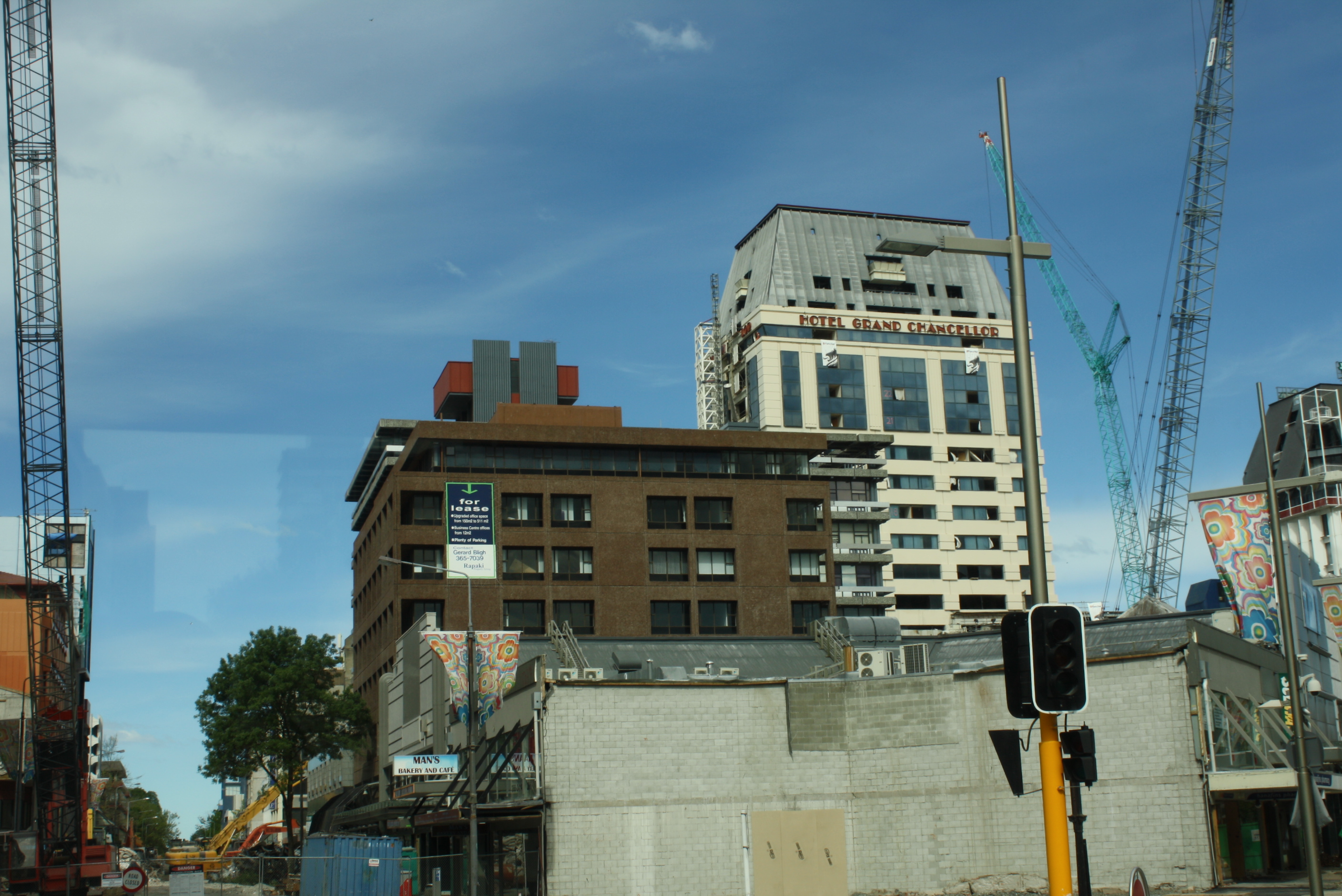
Photo taken in November 2011 during a red zone bus tour; the empty spot is where Fisher's Building used to stand

CERA ran weekend red zone bus tours from November to December 2011. Due to passengers not being allowed to exit the vehicles whilst they were inside the red zone, security and Red Cross personnel came on the buses. Passengers were also warned about the possibility of being trapped or crushed by a collapsing building. Red Bus started operating bus tours in July 2012, and three companies were selected in March 2013 to give tours.

From November to December 2011, a pathway surrounded by security fences between Cathedral Square and Cashell Mall allowed the public to visit the area. It was open during weekends and shut on weekdays.
