= Re:START =

Temporary mall in Christchurch, New Zealand

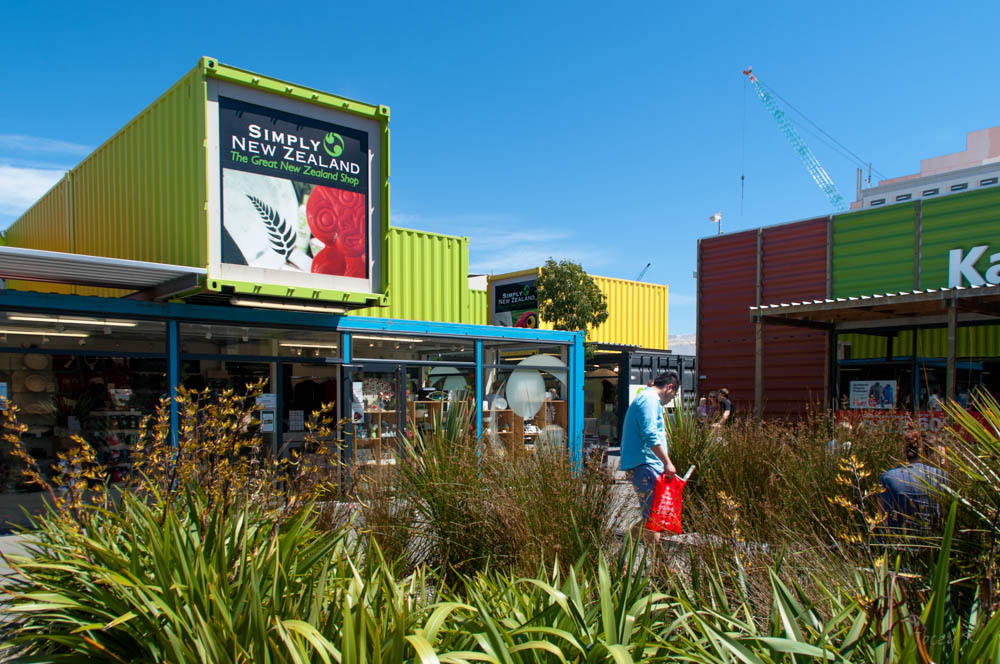
- Re:START in November 2013
- Location: Cashel Street; City Mall, Christchurch, New Zealand; 43°31′59.77″S 172°38′6.27″E
- Opening date: 29 October 2011; 14 years ago
- Closing date: 31 January 2018; 8 years ago
- Developer: Restart The Heart Trust
- Number of tenants: c. 50
- Interactive map of Re:START

Container Mall (originally called Re:START) was a temporary mall built from shipping containers in Christchurch Central City, New Zealand. It was a response to the 22 February 2011 Christchurch earthquake, which destroyed most buildings in City Mall (Cashel and High Streets), and resulted in the central city being cordoned off from public access while buildings were being demolished. Initially considered a short-term response to the lack of permanent buildings, Re:START was popular with locals and tourists alike and remained open for business until January 2018.

== Background ==
City Mall was the main shopping area in central Christchurch. The pedestrian mall was made up of two blocks of Cashel Street (from Oxford Terrace to High Street), and one block of High Street (from Cashel Street to Hereford Street). The central city including buildings in City Mall suffered some damage in the 4 September 2010 Canterbury earthquake. Although lower in magnitude, the 2010 Boxing Day earthquake was more damaging as the epicentre was directly located under the central city. It was the 22 February 2011 Christchurch earthquake that all but devastated the city centre, when many of the building façades of the historic buildings in the mall collapsed.

== History ==
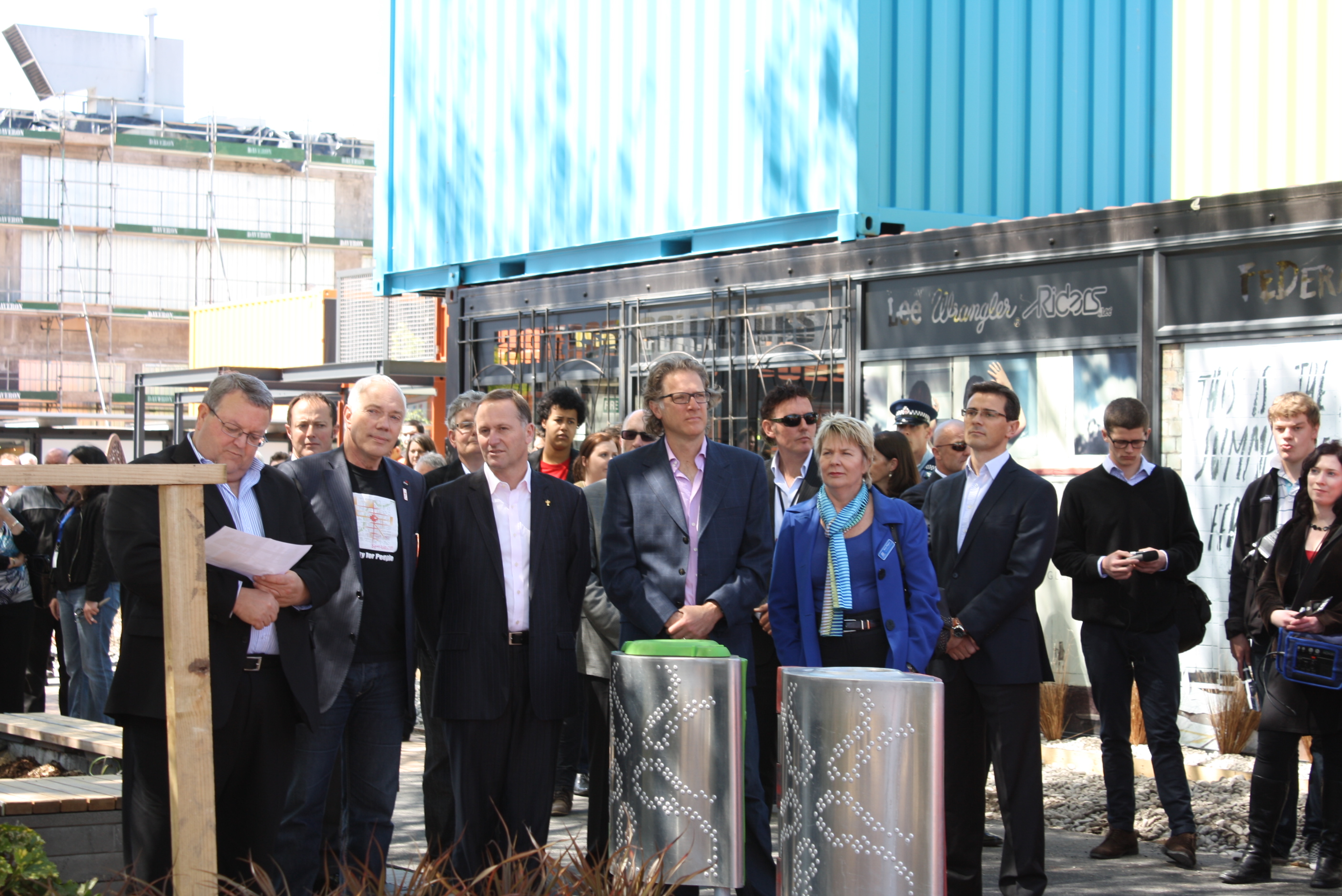
Dignitaries at the Re:START opening (from left): Gerry Brownlee, Bob Parker, John Key, Roger Sutton, and Nicky Wagner; Brendon Burns and Paul Lonsdale are in the second row

=== Original location ===
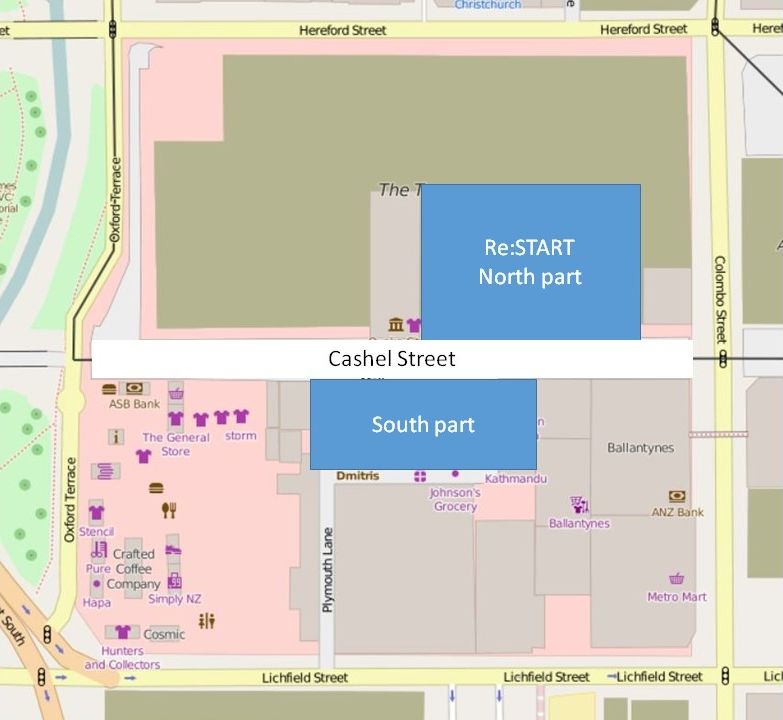
Location of Re:START from October 2011 to June 2014

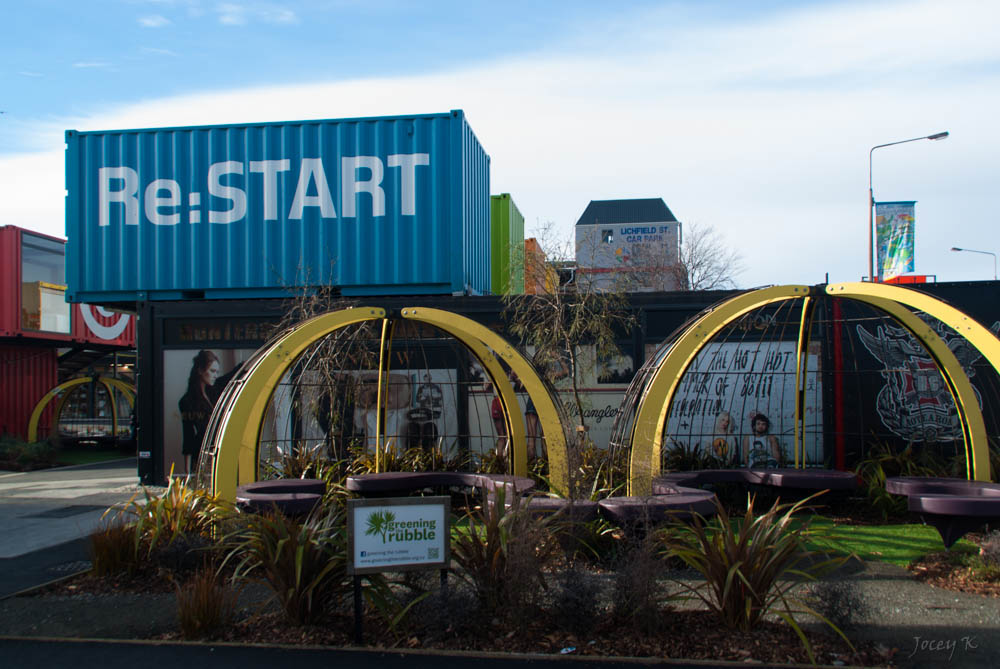
Re:START in July 2014

In April 2011, it was announced that part of Cashel Street was to reopen on 29 October 2011. The date was set just prior to Cup and Show Week, where the Canterbury A&P Show is held in the week that coincides with the provincial anniversary day. The initiative was driven by the Restart The Heart Trust, which was set up for the purpose of getting retail back into the central city. The Restart The Heart Trust was given an interest-free loan of $3.36 million by the Christchurch Earthquake Appeal Trust. Temporary shops made from shipping containers were fitted out as retail premises, to accommodate 27 shops branded as Re:START. Ballantynes, Christchurch's remaining department store, also reopened and is the retail anchor. Prime Minister John Key officiated at the opening ceremony.

The original proponent of the concept, Paul Lonsdale of the Central City Business Association, became the manager of the mall initiative. Lonsdale and others initially claimed that it was the world first pop-up mall, but there were already container malls in other places, for example Cholula (Mexico) and Bishkek (Kyrgyzstan). Organisers of the Christchurch mall project were threatened with legal action by organisers of a similar project in London (Boxpark) that was yet to open. Shipping containers were chosen because they were "strong & re-locatable" (the mall was developed while Christchurch still experienced strong aftershocks, e.g. the June 2011 earthquake), and due to agreements with land owners, it may be necessary to relocate the mall to make way for building reconstruction. The initial 27 tenants were given six-months contracts.

Re:START was opened on Saturday, 29 October 2011 by the mayor, Bob Parker, and the prime minister, John Key, with the latter calling the project "incredibly funky". An estimated 10,000 visitors came to the opening, with one retailer describing it as having a "carnival atmosphere". Access to Re:START was from the western end of City Mall, with much of the central city still cordoned off, including Colombo Street; it was not until 30 June 2013 that the central city cordons were removed. The initial layout saw about two-thirds of the shops north of Cashel Street opposite Ballantynes, and the remainder south of Cashel Street to the west of Ballantynes.

=== June 2014 move ===
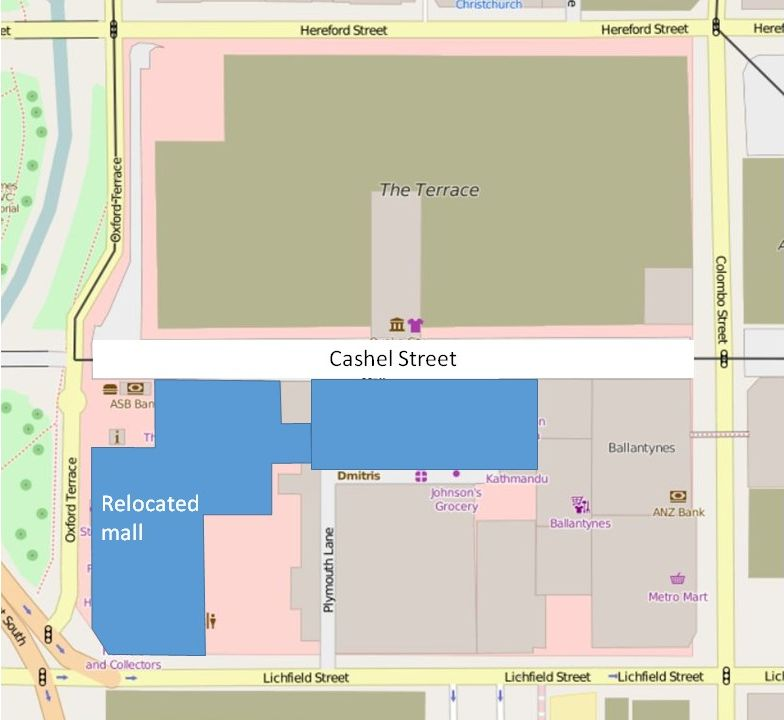
Location of Re:START since June 2014

In December 2013, it was announced that by April 2014, Re:START may have to close, which evoked a strong reaction by the public and stakeholders for it to be retained. The lease on the northern part of the mall was about to expire, with most of the land owned by Lichfield Holdings, and a building project was about to start. A month later, it was reported that negotiations were under way for a relocation of the northern part of the mall. In February 2014, the Christchurch newspaper The Press announced that the northern part of the mall was to shift west, to be adjacent to the part that is located south of Cashel Street. The Earthquake Recovery Minister, Gerry Brownlee, announced in March 2014 that the Crown had given a $1.27 million grant to the Restart The Heart Trust for relocation onto land partially owned by the Crown and partially in private hands. It took 10 days to relocate the northern part of the mall, and Brownlee opened the relocated part on 13 June 2014.

== Effects ==
In 2012, Christchurch's earthquake recovery was given a boost when international travel guide Lonely Planet included it in its list of 'top 10 cities to visit' in 2013, with Re:START listed as "most bizarre sight".

Re:START manager Lonsdale gained a high-profile through this initiative and was one of two main contenders for the Christchurch mayoralty in the October 2013 local elections. Beaten by former Labour Party MP Lianne Dalziel for the mayoralty, Lonsdale was successful as a Christchurch City Councillor.

== Closure ==
With closure of the mall pending, the Re:Start the Heart Trust wound up in 2017 and the assets were sold to Riverside Ltd, a development company led by Richard Peebles. The container mall closed on Wednesday, 31 January 2018, with the various tenants dispersing to other locations throughout the city centre. Riverside Ltd bought land in that area from The Crown to achieve half a hectare (5000 square metres), which is the minimum development size for the city mall area. They planned to place five buildings on the site bounded by Cashel Street, Oxford Terrace, and Lichfield Street, including a 7-day indoor farmers' market. The cost of this development is NZ$80 million.

== See also ==
- Tin Town, a similar temporary shopping centre following the 1931 Hawke's Bay earthquake
