= Boxpark =

Food/retail park made from shipping containers

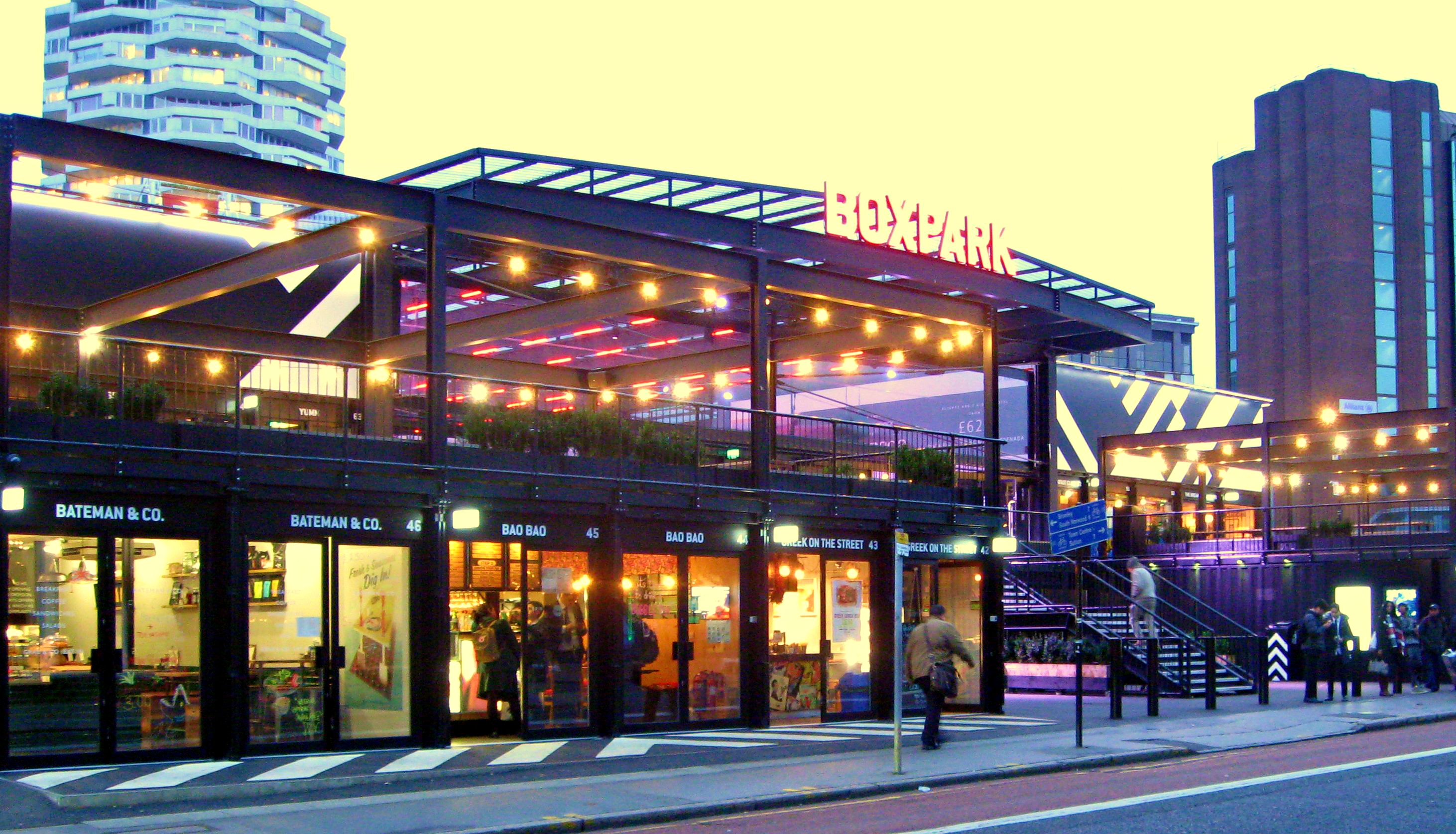
Boxpark Croydon

Boxpark is a food and retail park made out of refitted shipping containers in Britain. It was founded by Roger Wade, who described it as the "world's first pop-up mall". The first Boxpark was launched in Shoreditch in 2011, followed by a second built in Croydon next to East Croydon station in 2016, and others were opened in Wembley in late 2018, and Liverpool and Camden Town in 2024.

== Origin ==
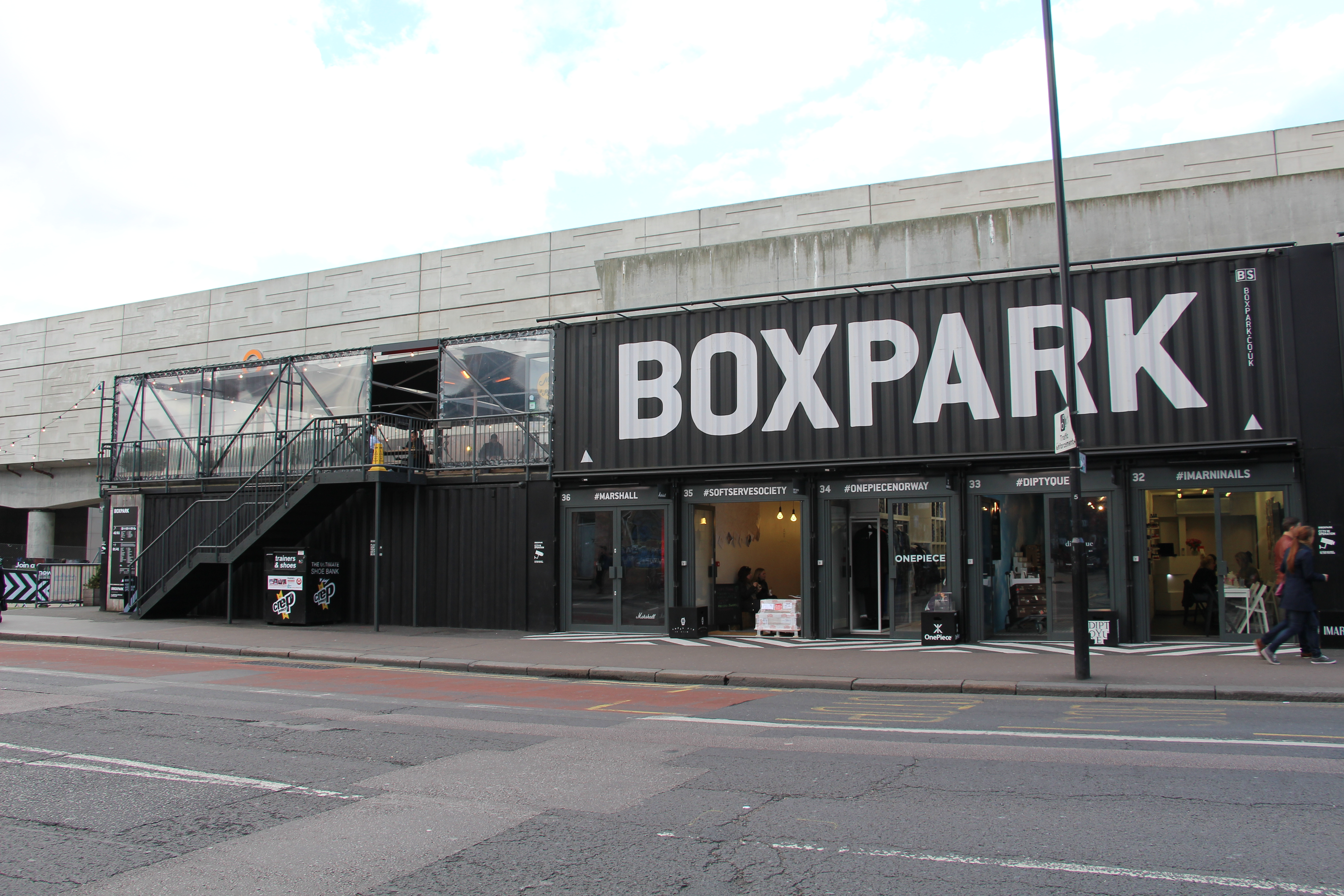
The first Boxpark opened in Shoreditch in 2011.

According to its founder Roger Wade, who started out with the street fashion shop and label Boxfresh, the idea for a shopping centre made out of shipping containers has its origin in 1999, while he was attending German trade shows with Boxfresh. For each show, he would need to build a mini shop that would then be demolished, and he wondered if he could build a trade show stand in a container that could be reused. He said: "That was the beginning of my fascination, in 1999. Years later a friend was running retail developments, so some time in 2008-09 I wondered 'why not build a whole retail development out of containers?"

The first Boxpark was built in 2011 and was described "the world's first pop up mall". However, by then shipping containers had already been used as pop-up shops, office and retail spaces around the world, for example the portable Puma City shop in US cities, and the Dordoy Bazaar in Bishkek, Kyrgyzstan. The company has plans to expand to other countries; however, a retail park also called Boxpark that opened in Dubai is not part of this company.

== Boxpark Shoreditch ==
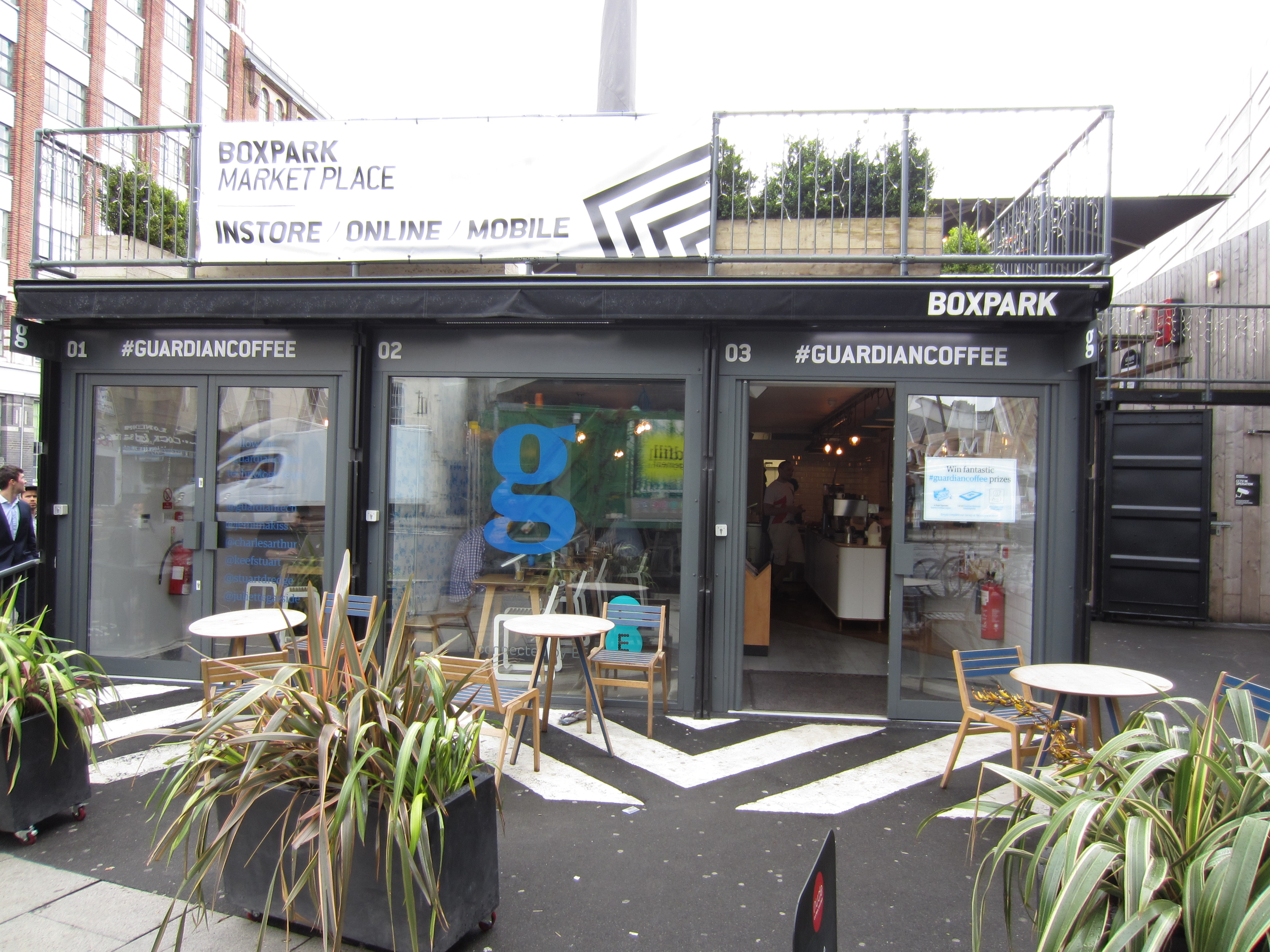
A coffee shop in Boxpark Shoreditch

The first temporary shopping centre, backed by Charles Dunstone of Carphone Warehouse, was built at Bethnal Green Road on part of the former Bishopsgate goods yard in Shoreditch. Boxpark opened in December 2011, initially made out of 60 recycled shipping containers over two floors, with 40 in the lower floor, 20 in the upper floor. Originally intended to open for five years, the centre is still operating. Boxpark Shoreditch has 19 restaurants and bars and 27 shops.

The Boxpark at Shoreditch was redeveloped in 2017, with the upper deck becoming the focus for street food at the venue. In July 2024, it was announced that it would close down by the end of summer to make way for The Goodsyard development. In response to the announcement, The Night Time Industries Association started a campaign to save the site from closure, arguing that it has launched hundreds of new independent businesses and annually contributes more than £80 million to the local economy. The campaign to save Boxpark Shoreditch was a success and the site remains open as of August 2026.

== Boxpark Croydon ==
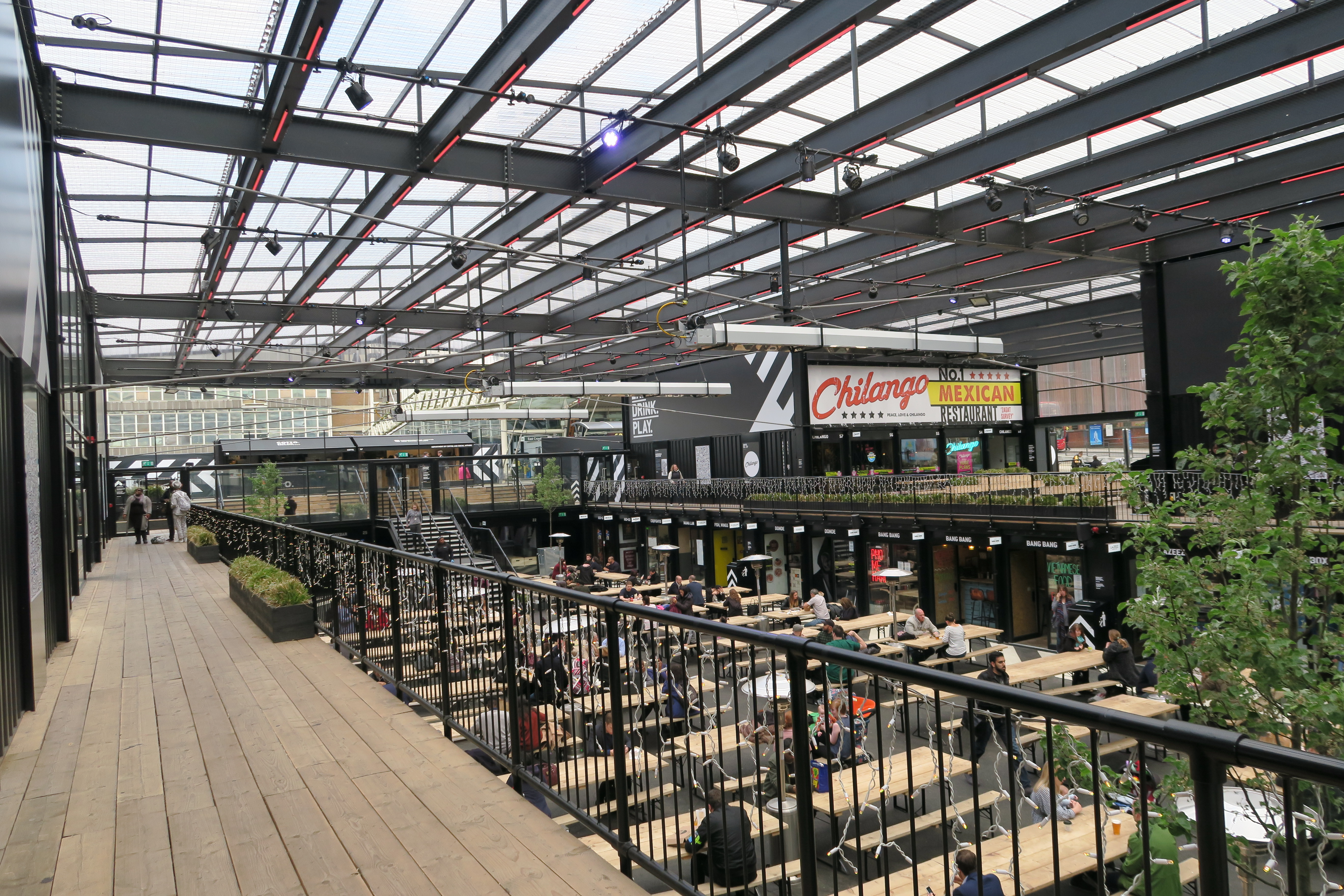
Interior view of Boxpark Croydon

On 20 March 2015, it was announced that a second Boxpark would be built in Croydon to coincide with the regeneration project Croydon Vision 2020. The centre was built with a £3 million loan from the Croydon Council and intended to be a temporary structure that would last for five years, until homes and offices could be developed on the site. The scheme was designed by BDP, and the two-storey structure is constructed out of 96 shipping containers. It is in the form of a semi-enclosed market hall with units arranged around it, and provides 24,000 sq ft of retail and restaurant space, double that of Shoreditch. The Boxpark in Croydon has a covered seating area, as it was found that trade dropped off during the winter months in Shoreditch when it was exposed to the elements. Boxpark Croydon has 36 shop units and is focused on dining and drink outlets. It opened in October 2016. It also hosts events such as music performances, kickboxing and screenings of films and football matches. The resident DJ of the Croydon is DJ Jay Knox.

== Boxpark Wembley ==
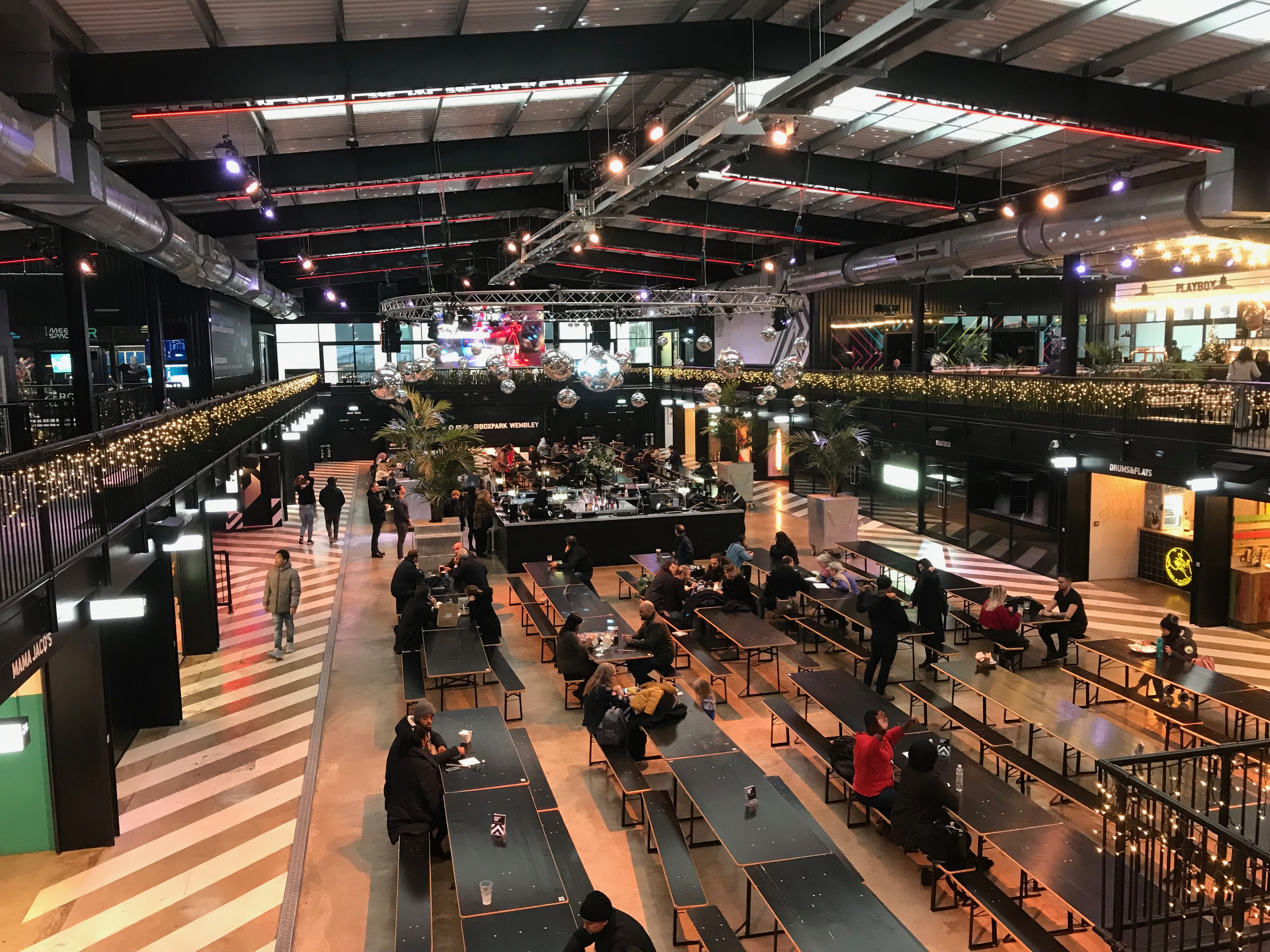
Boxpark Wembley

A third Boxpark opened near Wembley Stadium in December 2018. Boxpark Wembley is the largest one yet, covering a floor area of 50,000 sq ft, with a 2,000-person capacity events space. Boxpark Wembley has 30 units, and 24 food and drink retail outlets have opened at the venue. As with Boxpark Croydon, the open hall/events space may be used for events such as music performances and screenings. It is regularly used as a fan zone for those attending football matches, concerts and other events held at Wembley.

== Boxpark Liverpool ==
The first Boxpark outside London opened in the Baltic Triangle area of Liverpool on 19 April 2024. It is located in Cains Brewery Village operating on a 15-year lease, and the venue covers an area of 21,000 sq ft with a external terrace of 5,500 sq ft that may be used for dining and events. As with the other Boxparks, Boxpark Liverpool is used as a venue for a variety of events.

== Boxpark Camden ==
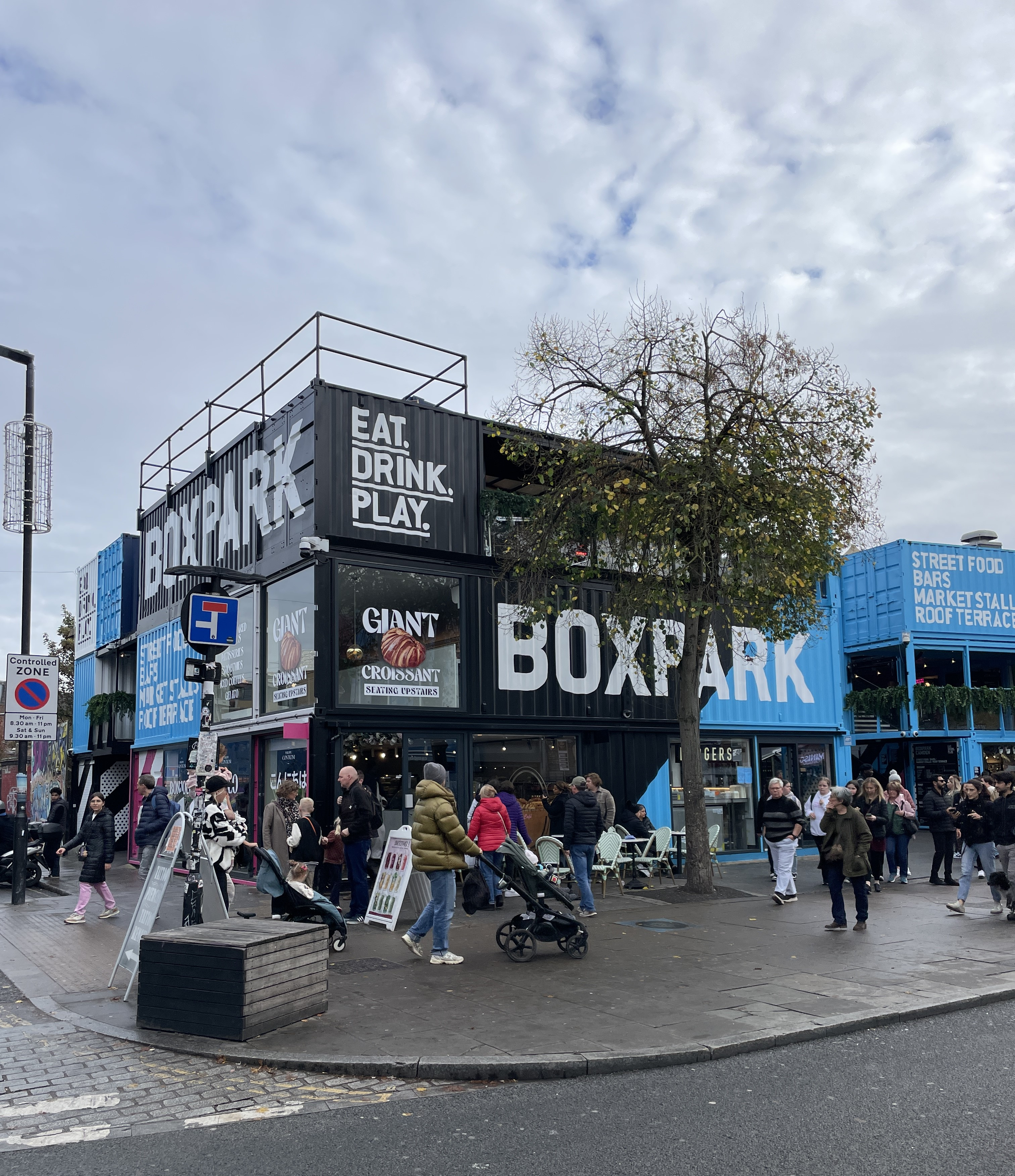
Boxpark Camden

Boxpark took over the Buck Street Market, a venue also constructed from shipping containers, in 2024. The venue was renovated with a floor added for a planned rooftop terrace. Box park Camden opened in September 2024. The venue covers 3 floors and has 60 food and retail units with 2 bars.

== See also ==
- Re:START, a temporary shopping centre in Christchurch, New Zealand.
- Downtown Container Park, is an outdoor shopping mall and entertainment complex in Las Vegas, Nevada, in which the shops and restaurants are housed in repurposed shipping containers
- Shipping container architecture
