= December 2010 Christchurch earthquake =

Earthquake in New Zealand

Boxing Day earthquake
- Location within New Zealand
- UTC time: 2010-12-25 21:30:15
- ISC event: 15882518
- USGS-ANSS: ComCat
- Local date: 26 December 2010
- Local time: 10:30 am NZDT (UTC+13)
- Magnitude: M_{w} 4.7 mb 4.5
- Depth: 4–5 km (2–3 mi)
- Epicentre: 43.55°S 172.63°E
- Areas affected: Christchurch, New Zealand
- Max. intensity: MMI VI (Strong)

The December 2010 Christchurch earthquake (also known as the Boxing Day earthquake) was a M_{w} 4.7 earthquake which occurred on 26 December 2010, directly under the city centre of Christchurch, New Zealand, at a depth between 4 and 5 km (2.5 and 3.1 mi). It caused significant damage to the city, and was part of the earthquake sequence beginning with the September 2010 Darfield earthquake, and followed by the 2011 Christchurch earthquake. Businesses running their Boxing Day promotions at the time lost revenue due to the earthquake, and responded by re-running Boxing Day sales on 12 February 2011.

The earthquake caused strong ground shaking in the city centre but there were no casualties. It caused some masonry to fall onto streets, windows to break and a few walls to collapse, with damage being worst in the pedestrian mall City Mall. Damage mostly occurred on buildings that had been affected by the Darfield earthquake and its earlier aftershocks. Cordons were placed around two blocks and multiple separate buildings, and were mostly gone within a day. By 14 January, the Earthquake Commission received 6,895 damage claims.

== Background ==
A magnitude 7.1 M_{w} earthquake, known as the Darfield earthquake, occurred on 4 September 2010, and had, at the time, the biggest ground shaking ever to be recorded in New Zealand, at 1.26 g (1.26 times the acceleration of gravity). The Darfield quake occurred along the Greendale Fault, and had thousands of shallow aftershocks over the coming months. Most occurred along the fault's surface trace, but there was also a zone of aftershocks extending northwards from the middle of the fault trace, as well as beyond the western and eastern (towards Christchurch) sides. The Boxing Day aftershock occurred in the eastern cluster. Most aftershocks were under magnitude 3 and did not cause significant damage, however a few did, including a magnitude 5.0 quake on 19 October, a magnitude 4.7 quake on 14 November, the M_{w} 4.7 Boxing Day quake and the M_{w} 6.2 22 February 2011 earthquake. The February earthquake caused 185 deaths and tens of billion dollars in damage.

== Earthquake ==
The earthquake occurred at 10:30 a.m. on Boxing Day, 26 December 2010, and had a moment magnitude (M_{w}) of 4.7 and local magnitude (M_{L}) of 4.9. The hypocentre was located 4–5 km (2.5–3.1 mi) under the city, with an epicentre near Barbadoes Street, or 1.8 km (1.1 mi) northwest of Christ Church Cathedral. It was Christchurch's largest earthquake by magnitude since mid-November, and the 17th biggest since the sequence began in September.

The maximum peak ground acceleration measured 0.4 g, at Christchurch Botanic Gardens. By contrast, the M_{w} 7.1 Darfield earthquake had peak ground accelerations in the central city ranging up to 0.3 g. The Boxing Day earthquake did not last as long as the Darfield event, and hence resulted in less damage. The shallow depth of the earthquake resulted in strong ground shaking, but due to the low magnitude, it was restricted to within central Christchurch.

The Boxing Day earthquake was followed by an aftershock sequence in the same area, with 'two dozen' occurring in the first 36 hours, and more than 30 occurring within three-to-four weeks. They mostly occurred within a 1 km^{2} (0.39 sq mi) area, at depths of 3.5–7 km (2.2–4.3 mi), along a steeply dipping strike-slip fault striking east–northeast. Activity on that fault was spread over a distance of about 2.5 km (1.6 mi). Five aftershocks had magnitudes of at least M_{L} 4.0, and 20 measured M_{L} 3.0 or greater.

Because the earthquake did not occur on the Greendale Fault that ruptured in the Darfield earthquake, the Boxing Day earthquake does not fit GNS Science's definition of an aftershock, which should occur on the same fault. As it is likely that the Boxing Day earthquake resulted from the stress changes following the Darfield earthquake, it can be 'loosely' considered an aftershock.

== Damage and effects ==
The Boxing Day earthquake caused "significant" damage to Christchurch, which mostly occurred on buildings that had already been damaged in the Darfield earthquake and its aftershocks. Of the 3,000 buildings inspected within a day of the earthquake (out of 5,000) in Four Avenues, 115 needed repairs.

Immediately after the earthquake, 40,000 homes in Papanui, St Albans and Fendalton lost power. It took about an hour for it to be mostly restored, and the power network did not experience significant damage. The earthquake also caused windows to break, including those in shop fronts. A few walls collapsed and a few buildings had masonry fall onto streets, including the Southern Encounter Aquarium building in Cathedral Square. Several buildings had a few cracks form and bricks loosened. Some sprinkler pipes broke and the upper section of a building fell onto Manchester Street. The damage was worst in City Mall, a pedestrian mall, "where an internal wall collapsed and building parapets crumbled", and some doors jammed which trapped people in buildings. Bricks and debris fell off a building and crashed through the roof of a restaurant in City Mall, crushing several tables. According to the owner, if the restaurant was operating at the time of the earthquake, people could have died as a result. There was no damage to the water, wastewater or stormwater networks, and there were no reports of injuries.

By 6 January, the Earthquake Commission had received 3,500 damage compensation claims, and that rose to 6,895 by 14 January. By contrast, the Darfield earthquake had 157,000 at that point in time, the 19 October earthquake had 2,139 claims on 6 January and the 14 November aftershock had 1,986. This was also more than the 6,200 claims received after the M_{w} 6.7 2007 Gisborne earthquake.

An expert panel report commissioned by the Department of Building and Housing concluded that the Boxing Day and Darfield quakes "did not significantly reduce the earthquake resistance" of four major buildings that experienced building failure in the February 2011 earthquake: the CTV Building, the PGC Building, the Hotel Grand Chancellor building and the Forsyth Barr Building.

== Response ==
Shortly after the earthquake, hundreds of shoppers were evacuated from the Westfield Riccarton shopping mall. The fire service received 200 emergency calls, mostly from alarm activations. Other calls included gas leaks, small fires, and people being trapped in lifts or stairwells. Due to concerns about unstable structures, cordons were placed around two blocks and multiple separate buildings, including in City Mall and a section of Poplar Lane. In the late afternoon, these restricted zones were slowly scaled back, and mostly gone by the morning of 27 December. Police made three arrests relating to the cordons. A Civil Defence Emergency Operations Centre was set up at the city council's Hereford Street building.

The earthquake occurred on Boxing Day, which is one of the biggest shopping events of the year, giving it the name "Boxing Day" earthquake. The quake caused a few shops to close, and retailers experienced a drop in revenue: Christchurch electronic transactions were down 10.7% from the previous year, which was more than the national drop of 6.7%. To recoup for these losses, Boxing Day sales were re-run on 12 February 2011. It was launched by Mayor Bob Parker and Earthquake Recovery Minister Gerry Brownlee at City Mall, and received funding from the government, the city council and earthquake trusts.

Despite claims that New Year's Eve celebrations at Cathedral Square had to be relocated due to the damage, it did not happen. After structural assessments determined that there was no public danger, the council decided that the celebrations would continue and expected 15,000 attendees.

== See also ==
- List of earthquakes in 2010
- List of earthquakes in New Zealand
