= Fisher's Building =

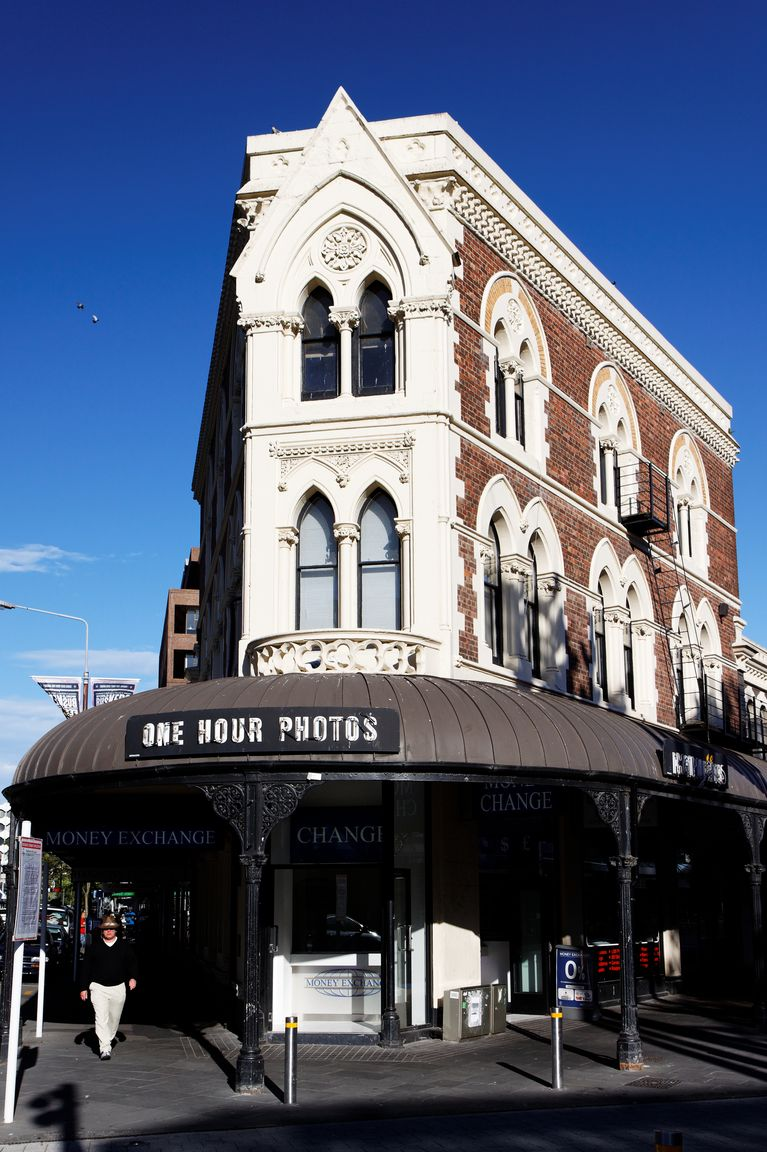
- The Fisher's Building in January 2010
- Interactive map of the Fisher's Building area
- Alternative names: Hanafins Building, Venetian Gothic Fisher building

General information
- Location: Christchurch Central, New Zealand, 280-282 High Street, Christchurch 8011
- Coordinates: 43°31′55.6″S 172°38′12.84″E
- Year built: 1880
- Renovated: 1979
- Destroyed: February 2011
- Demolished: July 2011

Design and construction
- Architect: William Armson
- Main contractor: James Tait

Renovating team
- Renovating firm: Collins, Hunt and Loveridge

The Fisher's Building (also known as the Hanafins Building) was a 19th-century Venetian Gothic building located in central Christchurch, New Zealand. It was designed in 1872 by architect William Armson and constructed from concrete and brick in 1880 on a central city site leased to Thomas Richard Fisher, who ran a tea and grocery store. The building was known for its prominent verandah, ornate design, and distinct corner shape.

A category-one heritage-listed property, the Fisher's Building was one of the few surviving examples of Venetian Gothic architecture in Christchurch. It was also the last surviving structure on Hereford Street designed by Armson, who had designed several commercial buildings in the area. Built as an extension to what was then the City Chambers, it occupied a corner site on the intersection of High Street and Hereford Street, giving it a distinctive triangle shape from above.

Following Fisher's death in 1890, the building was inherited by his estate and passed to numerous owners in the subsequent decades, until it was purchased in 1922 by Henry Slater Richards, who transferred it to his three sons in 1926. The brothers held joint interest until the 1970s, when it was transferred to Pyne Gould Guinness Limited in 1979 following a successful restoration project.

In 1929, the building became associated with James George Hanafin, who operated a chemist from property. In the 1980s, his descending relative Lawry Hanafin opened a photography store from the property, operating it for 30 years as one of the last tenants to run a business from the site.

Despite being strengthened and well cared for, the Fisher's Building was badly damaged in the 2011 Christchurch earthquake. It was demolished in July 2011, with Hanafin watching the demolition. The site was used as a car park until 2025, when it was redeveloped into retail space, becoming a store for The North Face in 2026.

== History ==
=== Construction and original owners ===
In 1872, the site of the building was owned by John Broughton. He leased it for a period of 56 years to Reverend Thomas Richard Fisher, a businessman and local Wesleyan clergyman who had given up his work with the church for health reasons. The original wooden building on the site was demolished in May 1880 by Fisher, with tender for the construction of a new building given to James Tait that August. Tait was a Scottish immigrant regarded as a fine stonemason, who later served as the second mayor of Sumner.

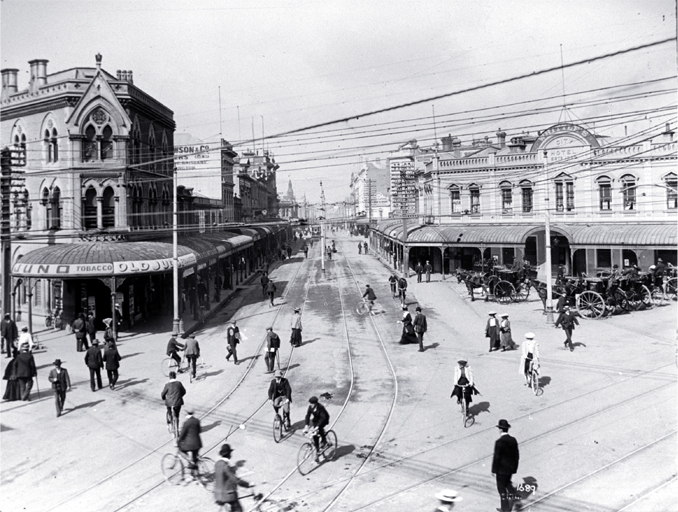
The building (left) circa 1910

The building was designed by architect William Armson in 1871, and was one of his later projects prior to his ill-health and eventual death just two years after the building was built. It was constructed from concrete and brick, and built as an extension to the adjacent City Chambers building. Located on the intersection of High Street and Hereford Street, the building took on a triangle shape when viewed from above to conform to the limits of the site. It became prominent for its distinctive verandah, corner shape, and ornate details, including a spiral staircase in the interior.

Fisher had previously run a tea and grocery shop named Alliance Tea Company, and later moved into art and picture framing. He died in 1890, and the lease was inherited by his estate. The property was later bought from Broughton by Henry Slater Richards in 1922, and was transferred to his three sons in 1926 after his death.

Over the decades, various tenants occupied the building, including tobacconists, confectioners, florists, and various firms using it for office space. In the 1950s, it was home to Robilliard Jewellers.

=== 1970s restoration ===
In 1978 the building required refurbishment and was considered for demolition. Still under ownership of Richards' sons, the building underwent strengthening, cleaning, and restoration to the brickwork and veranda roof. The project was undertaken by Maurice Hunt of Collins, Hunt and Loveridge. The following year, joint interest was transferred from the Richards' to Pyne Gould Guinness Limited.

In 1985, the building was registered as a Category 1 historic place.

=== Hanafins ===
In 1929, chemist James George Hanafin operated a shop in the Fisher's Building, and became associated with it by locals. Subsequently, the building became known as the Hanafins Building.

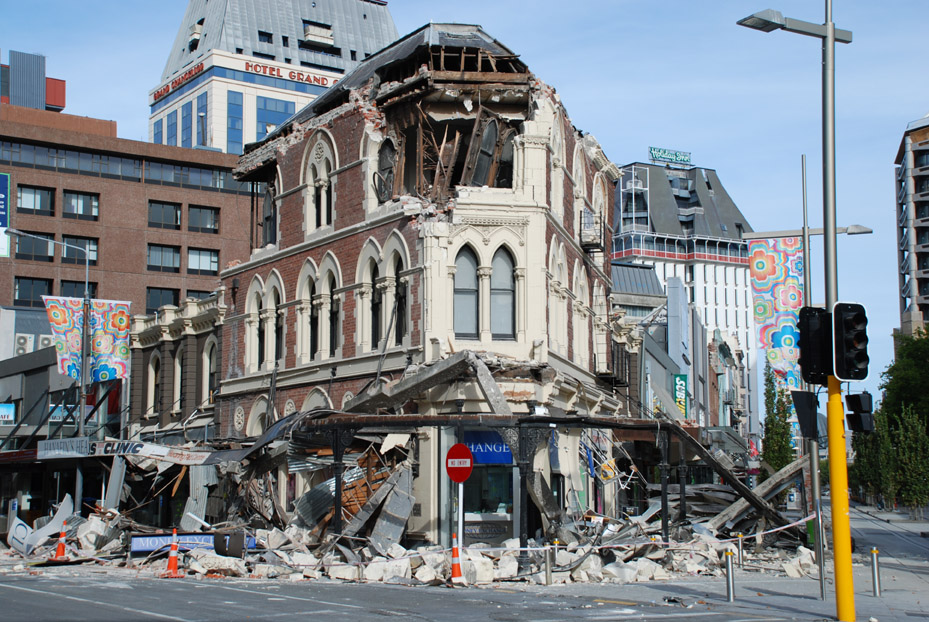
The damaged Fisher's building on 28 February 2011

In 1981, Lawry Hanafin, a descendant of James, opened a photography shop in the building, continuing the legacy. Hanafin operated his store from the building for thirty years until it was destroyed in the 2011 Christchurch earthquake, and watched as it was demolished.

Hanafin reopened his one-hour photography store in Westfield Riccarton mall. After 42 years, Hanafin closed his business on 21 June 2023 due to rising costs and a change in consumer demand. Loyal customers reportedly flew down to Christchurch to visit the store before it closed.

=== Earthquake damage and demolition ===
The Fisher's Building was severely damaged in the 2011 Christchurch earthquake; the top floor had lost much of its façade, with rubble destroying the verandah below. Despite having been taken care of and strengthened over its lifetime, as a brick and concrete heritage building, it did not survive the intensity of the earthquake. It was demolished in July 2011.

At the time of demolition, it was the last surviving building designed by Armson which had been constructed on Hereford Street, which once had several buildings designed by him. The land was used as car parking space until 2024, when a local developer announced that a new retail building would be constructed on the same site. Construction began in 2025, with the new building featuring a similar triangular shape; the space was acquired by The North Face and was officially opened on 18 July 2026 in a grand opening attended by Jossi Wells.
