= Margaret Frankel =

New Zealand artist (1902–1997)

Lady Margaret Frankel
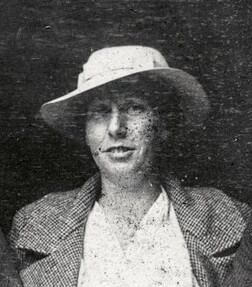
- Frankel, c. 1930
- Born: Elaine Margaret Anderson; 8 October 1902; Christchurch, New Zealand
- Died: 9 December 1997 (aged 95); Canberra, Australia
- Occupations: Painter; potter; printmaker; art teacher
- Spouse: Otto Frankel (m. 1939)

Elaine Margaret Frankel (née Anderson; 8 October 1902 – 9 December 1997) was a New Zealand painter, potter, printmaker and art teacher. She was a founding member of The Group, an association of New Zealand artists.

== Early life ==
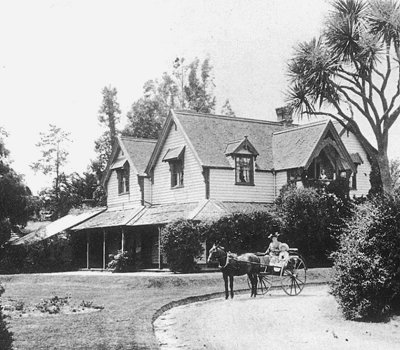
Risingholme, c. 1870

Frankel was born in Christchurch on 8 October 1902. She was the middle of three children of engineer Frederick Anderson and his wife Phoebe. Her grandfather, John Anderson (1820–1897), founded an engineering business, and two uncles, Andrew (1851–1927) and John (1849–1934), were prominent engineers. In April 1923 she left New Zealand to study painting in France for a year. She attended Rangi Ruru Girls' School. The family moved to Opawa in 1918, where they lived at Risingholme.

In 1925, Frankel enrolled at the Canterbury College School of Art and became an artist member of the Canterbury Society of Arts. Four of her impressionist watercolour paintings were exhibited by the society.

== The Group and career ==
In 1927, Frankel and friends (Cora Wilding, Viola Macmillan Brown, Ngaio Marsh, Evelyn Polson (later Page), Edith Wall, William H. Montgomery and Billy S. Baverstock) founded artist's association The Group and held their first exhibition on 3 August 1927. Frankel at this time was responsible for The Group's finances.

In 1929 Frankel exhibited fourteen paintings with The Group, mainly of local subjects and landscapes. In the same year she began teaching art at Rangi Ruru and began her diploma of fine arts at the Canterbury College School of Art. In 1933 she exhibited linocut prints with the New Zealand Society of Artists. She married scientist Otto Frankel on 8 December 1939. Frankel's notable landscapes around this time include Lyttelton Harbour – Rāpaki (1939) and Old Houses, Lyttelton (1946).

Frankel and her husband developed her childhood home into an arts and crafts centre called Risingholme Community Centre, which opened in 1945. Frankel taught pottery at the centre together with Doris Lusk. At a 1950 fête at the centre, Frankel was the "craft queen" and was crowned overall queen of the fête "by a narrow margin". Frankel became a committee member of the Canterbury Society of Arts in 1947.

From 1948 to 1951, Frankel worked to purchase Pleasure Garden by Frances Hodgkins for the city of Christchurch. Following Frankel's public appeal for subscriptions, the work was successfully purchased in 1949; however, the city council rejected the painting on the grounds that it was too modern. Frankel responded:

It is proper that any art gallery should have the right – indeed it has the duty – to refuse gifts which are not in keeping with high artistic standards. But can the painting in question seriously be challenged on these grounds? It is the work of an artist recently described by the art critic of Time and Tide as one of our greatest contemporary English painters at the time of her death.

Frankel received public support from other artists and members of The Group. A renewed offer in 1951 was accepted, and the painting was given to the Robert McDougall Art Gallery. Bill Sutton created a large painting based on this incident, with Frankel at the centre; his painting was later accidentally destroyed, but his sketches are still in existence.

== Move to Canberra and later life ==
In 1951 Frankel and her husband moved to live in Canberra. At the time of her last exhibition with The Group in October 1951, newspaper The Press described Frankel as having been "the moving spirit of [The Group] ever since it was founded".

After the move, Frankel gave up painting but continued with her pottery. Frankel joined the Canberra Art Club and assisted with its efforts to establish the Australian National Gallery; she and her husband would eventually leave a bequest to the gallery to fund the purchase of New Zealand art. In 1961 she ran an exhibition of Pacific and south-east Asian artworks as part of the Pan Pacific and Southeast Asia Women's Association's international conference. She became entitled to use the honorific Lady following her husband's knighthood in 1966.

Her pottery works were shown in exhibitions and art galleries in Australia. In 1972 she spoke to The Press about the acceptance of pottery as an art form rather than a hobby.

Frankel died in Canberra on 9 December 1997.
