= Samuel Farr (architect) =

19th-century New Zealand architect

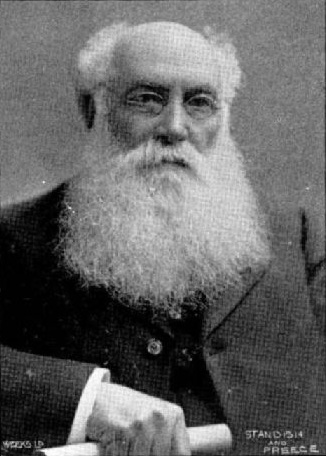
- Samuel Farr c. 1900
- Born: 1827; Baldock, North Hertfordshire, England
- Died: 14 July 1918 (aged 90–91); Christchurch, New Zealand
- Occupation: Architect
- Buildings: Cranmer Court; St Paul's Church

Samuel Charles Farr (1827 – 14 July 1918) was a 19th-century builder and architect in Christchurch, New Zealand. He intended to emigrate from England to Auckland, but significant shipping problems saw him end up in Akaroa in 1850 instead. From 1862, he lived in Christchurch. Farr has a number of firsts against his name: the first marriage in Canterbury, he designed Akaroa's first church, designed New Zealand's first iron verandahs, and he started Sunday schools in Canterbury. As a leading member of the Acclimatisation Society, he stocked almost every lake and river in Canterbury with fish and was instrumental in introducing the bumblebee to New Zealand. His most notable building was Cranmer Court, the former Normal School, in the Christchurch Central City; this building was demolished following the February 2011 Christchurch earthquake.

== Early life ==
Farr was born in Baldock, North Hertfordshire, England, in 1827. He was the son of a builder and was exposed to architecture through observing his father's work, but he did not receive formal training, which required working for an architect for four years. In 1849, Mary Ann Pavitt from Theydon Garnon visited friends in Baldock for a farewell, as she was to emigrate with her family to New Zealand. Farr and Pavitt fell in love and became engaged. She was the oldest daughter of John and Elizabeth Pavitt.

The Pavitt family and Farr left London on 19 November 1849, in the barque The Monarch for Auckland. On 5 March 1860, while The Monarch was crossing the Tasman Sea in a heavy gale, her rudder was carried away. The vessel drifted with the wind to the south of Stewart Island, and it took a fortnight to get a temporary rudder installed. The Monarch then made its way up the east coast of the South Island, but a week later the new rudder was carried away and was lost. On 2 April 1850, The Monarch managed to reach Akaroa, and there 41 passengers, including Farr, decided to remain.

== Akaroa ==
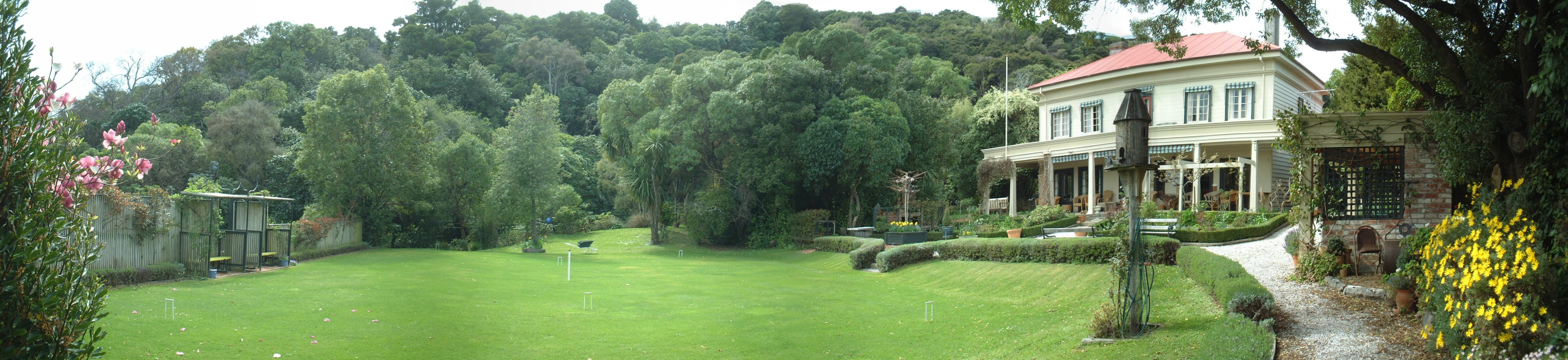
Augustus White's Blythcliffe in Akaroa

Farr and Pavitt's intention was of getting married as soon as possible after landing. However, there was no official available to perform the ceremony, and they did not have rings. Farr made his own ring from a half-sovereign, and shortly afterwards the local magistrate, John Watson, was appointed Registrar of Births, Deaths and Marriages. On 15 June 1850, the ceremony was performed, and this was the first marriage celebrated in the Canterbury region. Farr subsequently received commissions to make six similar rings.

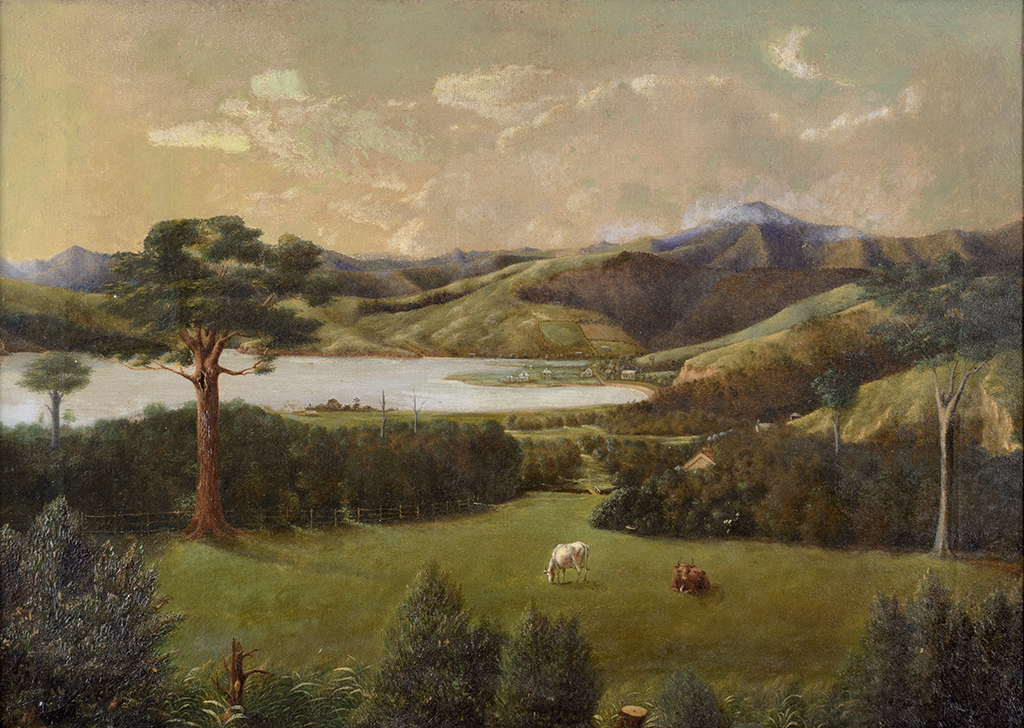
Oil painting by Farr of Akaroa, looking towards Children's Bay, around 1860

Farr was impressed with the scenery around Akaroa:

The panoramic bird's eye view we had of the luxuriant and romantic country almost baffles description... Over the bay, the water without a ripple mirrored the forest covered mountains with their soft purple tints. A scene so exquisite and fascinating could never pall. We were charmed with all we saw: the vegetation in its primeval beauty: almighty giants of the forest overshadowing dainty ferns and delicate mosses; rippling streamlets winding in sweet cadence amid the forest trees...

About the time of his arrival the first English flour mill in Canterbury was erected in Akaroa's Grehan Valley. Charles Haylock, who had also come out on The Monarch with his wife and his four sons, cut the timber for the building and machinery, and formed a water race and an 18-feet overshot wheel. The cog-wheels, which were made of wood, being incorrectly geared, were crushed at the first trial. Farr, having studied the theory of cog-wheels, volunteered his assistance, and re-constructed the wheels, with the result that within three weeks the mill was smoothly working. Farr next made a miniature working model of a saw mill, and subsequently, in partnership with the family of his wife, erected sawmills at Robinsons Bay, Barrys Bay, the Head of the Bay, and Duvauchelle.

Farr also followed his profession as an architect, and designed the original St Peter's Church, Akaroa's first church. It was built in 1852 in replaced in 1863, when it had become too small. Much later, in 1898, he designed the Akaroa Monument, an obelisque that stands at Greens Point where British Sovereignty was first demonstrated to French settlers on 11 August 1840 by raising a British flag. The first Sunday School in Canterbury was held on 30 June 1850, and was started by Farr with five scholars.

A residential building in Akaroa, Blythcliffe, is presumed to have been designed by Farr for Augustus White based on drawings prepared by the Australian architect John Verge. Built in 1857, it was "the grandest house of its day in Akaroa". Originally registered as Category II in 1983, its classification was later changed to Category I.

== Christchurch ==
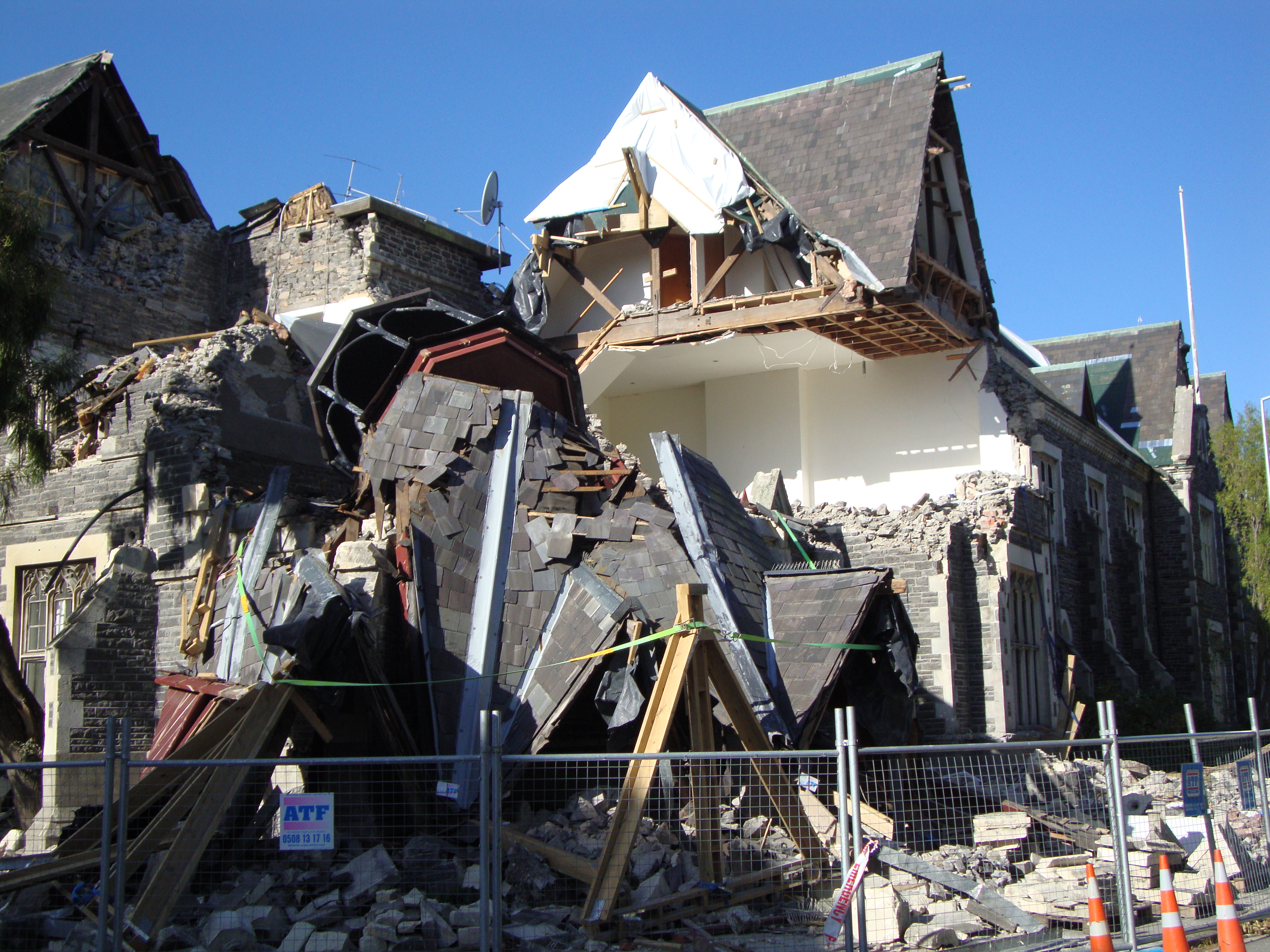
The octagonal corner room of Cranmer Court collapsed in the February 2011 Christchurch earthquake

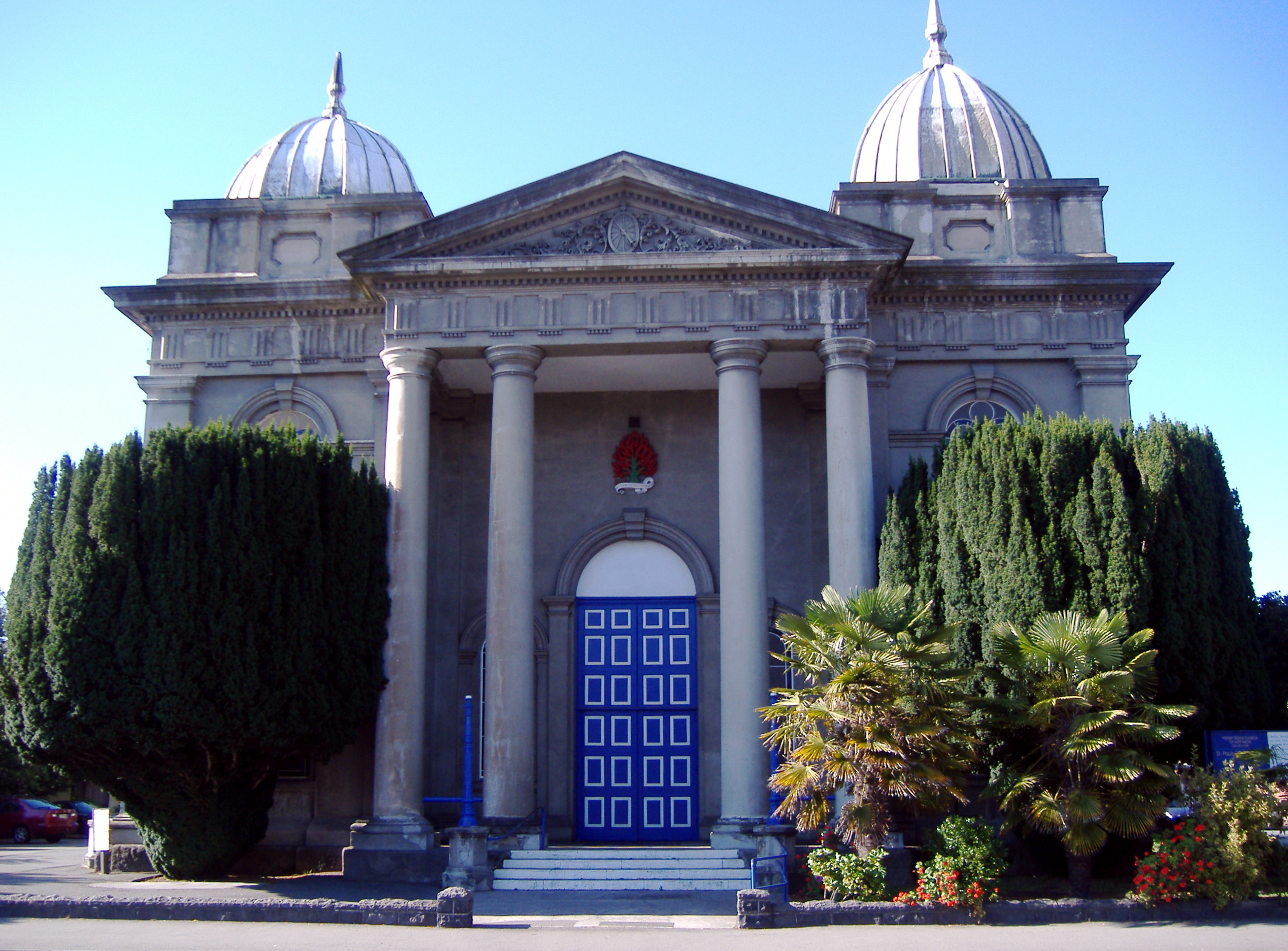
St Paul's Church also collapsed in the February 2011 Christchurch earthquake

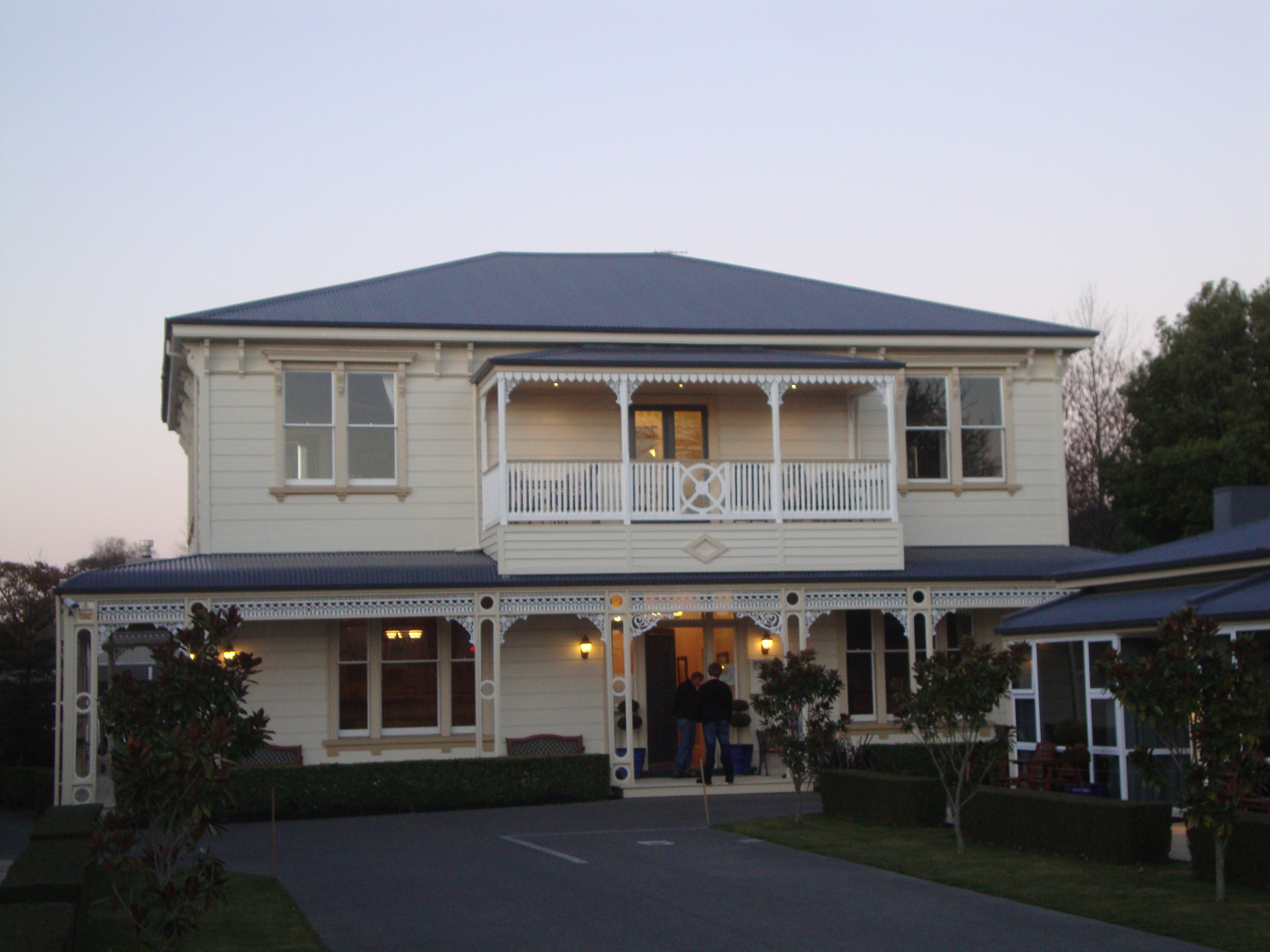
Te Wepu (now Merivale Manor) on Papanui Road was built for Henry Richard Webb

In March 1862, Farr came to Christchurch. He received many commissions from the Presbyterian church and designed churches at Akaroa (1860), both the original (1864) and the final (1876; demolished 2011) St Paul's Church, Christchurch in central Christchurch, Lyttelton (St John's Church, 1865, demolished in 2012), Kaiapoi (St Paul's Church, 1875, demolished 1976), Leeston (St David's Church, 1879), and Bealey Avenue in the Christchurch Central City (Knox Church (original church) 1880, demolished 1964). An architectural competition was held for a new Methodist church in Durham Street, which was won by architectural firm Crouch and Wilson from Melbourne. Farr came second in the 1863 competition and was engaged to undertake the construction supervision. Farr was chosen as the architect for the original Trinity Congregational Church. The church, built in stone, was opened with a series of opening services starting on 23 November 1864. By 1870, the church had become too small for the congregation, and there were problems with ventilation. Four architects were invited to provide designs for a new building: Farr, Benjamin Mountfort, William Armson and Robert Lawson. Although Farr was a Deacon of the Trinity Congregational Church and had designed the first church, the design of Mountfort was chosen, who was a devout Anglican. Farr's name is listed on the foundation stone as the church's Deacon.

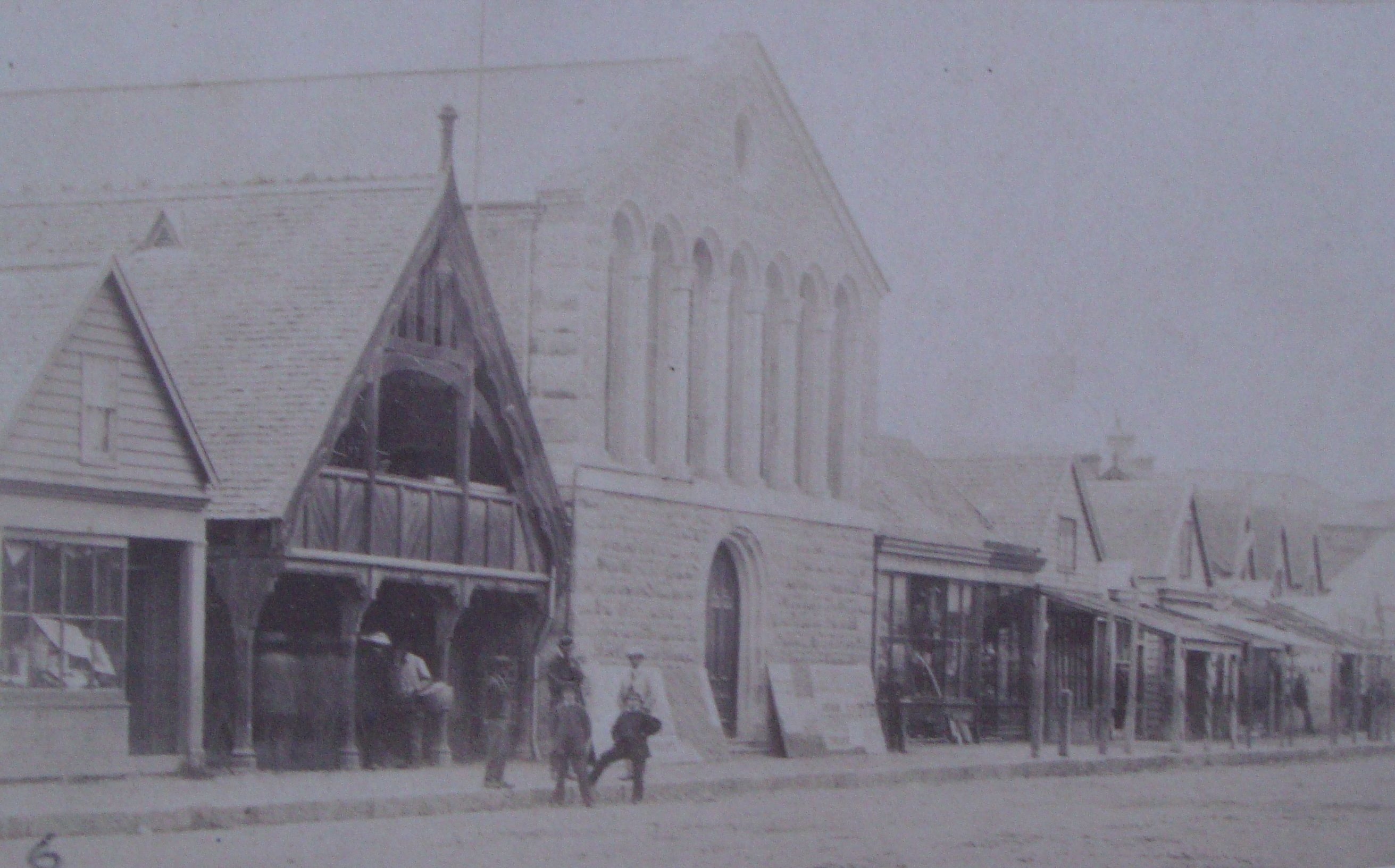
Christchurch's first two town halls, with the timber building the first and the stone building on its right the one designed by Farr

Farr's most notable work is the Normal School at Cranmer Square. He won the design competition against 11 others and put Robert Lawson into second place. After conversion to apartments in the 1980s, the complex became known as Cranmer Court. The buildings suffered significant damage in the February 2011 Christchurch earthquake and although the apartment owners collectively spent NZ$1m in emergency repairs, the buildings are now awaiting demolition.

From 1870 to 1872, Farr was the Lyttelton Borough Council Surveyor. He designed and erected the first iron verandahs in New Zealand, at a shop in Cashel Street. At the Canterbury Jubilee Exhibition of 1900, Farr exhibited a bas-relief plan of Banks Peninsula, carved in wood, for which be received a gold medal.

Farr designed Hambleden for George Gould, one of the notable early settlers of Christchurch. The house, named after Gould's birthplace, prominently stood on the corner of Bealey Avenue and Springfield Road, and was the first house built on Bealey Avenue. After Gould's death in 1889, it was the residence of the Bishop of Christchurch, Churchill Julius, for a few years. It was demolished within days of the February 2011 Christchurch earthquake. Another Christchurch residential design was Te Wepu for Henry Richard Webb. Located on Papanui Road, but with an entrance off a side street that was named Webb Street, the house is today used as a hotel and apartments and has been renamed Merivale Manor. The building is registered as Category II by NZHPT.

Farr was engaged by George Henry Moore to design most of the buildings at Glenmark Station. Moore is described as a "supremely successful runholder" in New Zealand's pastoral history. Four separate NZHPT registrations cover various buildings of the station, designed to give expression to his wealth. The stables, built in the 1880s in concrete for 50 horses, have a Category I listing. The other three entries (ruins of original house, the Station Lodge, and the Station Manager's House) are listed as Category II.

Farr designed the second (privately owned) Christchurch Town Hall. The first opened in 1857 to a design by Benjamin Mountfort and Isaac Luck on the south-west side of High Street in the section between Lichfield and Cashel. Farr's building opened in 1863 and was sited immediately to the right of the first town hall. Farr's design was in stone and suffered damage in the 1869 Christchurch earthquake, with the architect blamed for these structural problems, which caused the low point of his career. Farr's Town Hall was destroyed in a fire in April 1873.

William Armson, Benjamin Mountfort, Alexander Lean and Frederick Strouts formed the Canterbury Association of Architects in the 1870s and denied membership to Farr due to his lack of formal training.

Outside of architecture, Farr was involved in various community groups. For 22 years, he was secretary of the Acclimatisation Society, during which time he stocked almost every lake and river in Canterbury with fish. He was also instrumental in introducing the Bumble Bee into New Zealand. Farr established the first Sunday School Union in Christchurch in 1869, and was president for the first seven years. He was also chairman and an active officer in the Volunteer Fire Police.

Farr was a Christchurch City Councillor in 1865, 1866 and 1873. He was first elected on 11 January 1865, when five positions were to be filled. Other successful candidates at that election were John Ollivier, Edward Bishop (a later Mayor of Christchurch), Isaac Luck and W. H. Lane.

== Family ==
The Farrs had two children. Their daughter, Annie Stevens Farr (1852–1926), married Dr Francis McBean Stewart. Their son, Everard Cecil Farr (1859–1937), practised as an architect in Wellington. He was married twice. Mary Ann Farr died in 1912. Samuel Farr died on 14 July 1918, aged 91. Both are buried at Addington Cemetery.

== Selected buildings ==
- St Paul's Church, Christchurch (demolished)
- Cranmer Court, Christchurch
- Dalcroy House, Lyttelton
- Te Wepu, Christchurch
- Blythcliffe, Akaroa
- Glenmark Station (various buildings)
