= John Elmslie =

Scottish minister

John Elmslie (1 October 1831 – 23 July 1907) was a Scottish minister who twice served as Moderator of the General Assembly for the Northern Assembly of New Zealand for the Free Church of Scotland (1872 and 1892).

== Life ==
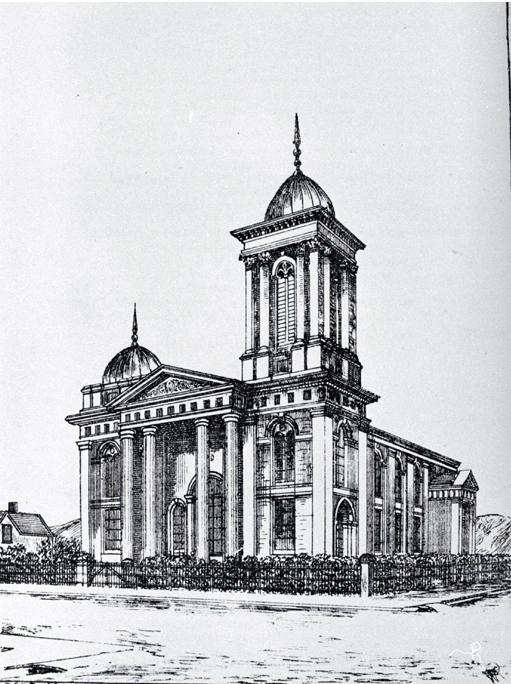
St Paul's in Christchurch

He was born at Southfield in Keig in Aberdeenshire on 1 October 1831 the son of Peter Elmslie a farmer, and his wife Kathrine Lawson.

He studied Divinity at Aberdeen University and the Free Church College in Aberdeen. He was ordained as a minister by the Free Church of Scotland in 1862 at Kennethmont in Aberdeenshire.

In 1866 he emigrated to New Zealand on the ship Caribou and settled in Wanganui. In 1872 he served as Moderator of the Presbyterian Church for North Island.

In 1876 he was translated to St Paul's Church in Christchurch; this was a breakaway congregation from St Andrew's Church (which has since been relocated and now belongs to Rangi Ruru Girls' School). The most prominent person of the breakaway congregation was John Anderson, the second Mayor of Christchurch (1868–69). Elmslie commissioned architect Samuel Farr to build a bigger and grander church—St Paul's Trinity Pacific Church—at a cost of £12000.

In 1890 Aberdeen University awarded him an honorary Doctor of Divinity.

In 1892 he served as Moderator – the highest position in his church.

He retired in 1903 and died in Christchurch on 23 July 1907. He is buried with his first wife in Addington Cemetery in Christchurch.

== Family ==
In 1862 in Keig, he married Jessie Mitchell (1836–1878) a farmer's daughter, also of Keig, a long-term acquaintance since childhood. She died giving birth to their seventh child in 1878. In 1881, he married Jane Harper Anderson (1853–1936), the eldest daughter of John Anderson. He had two children by his second wife.
