= Guthrey Centre =

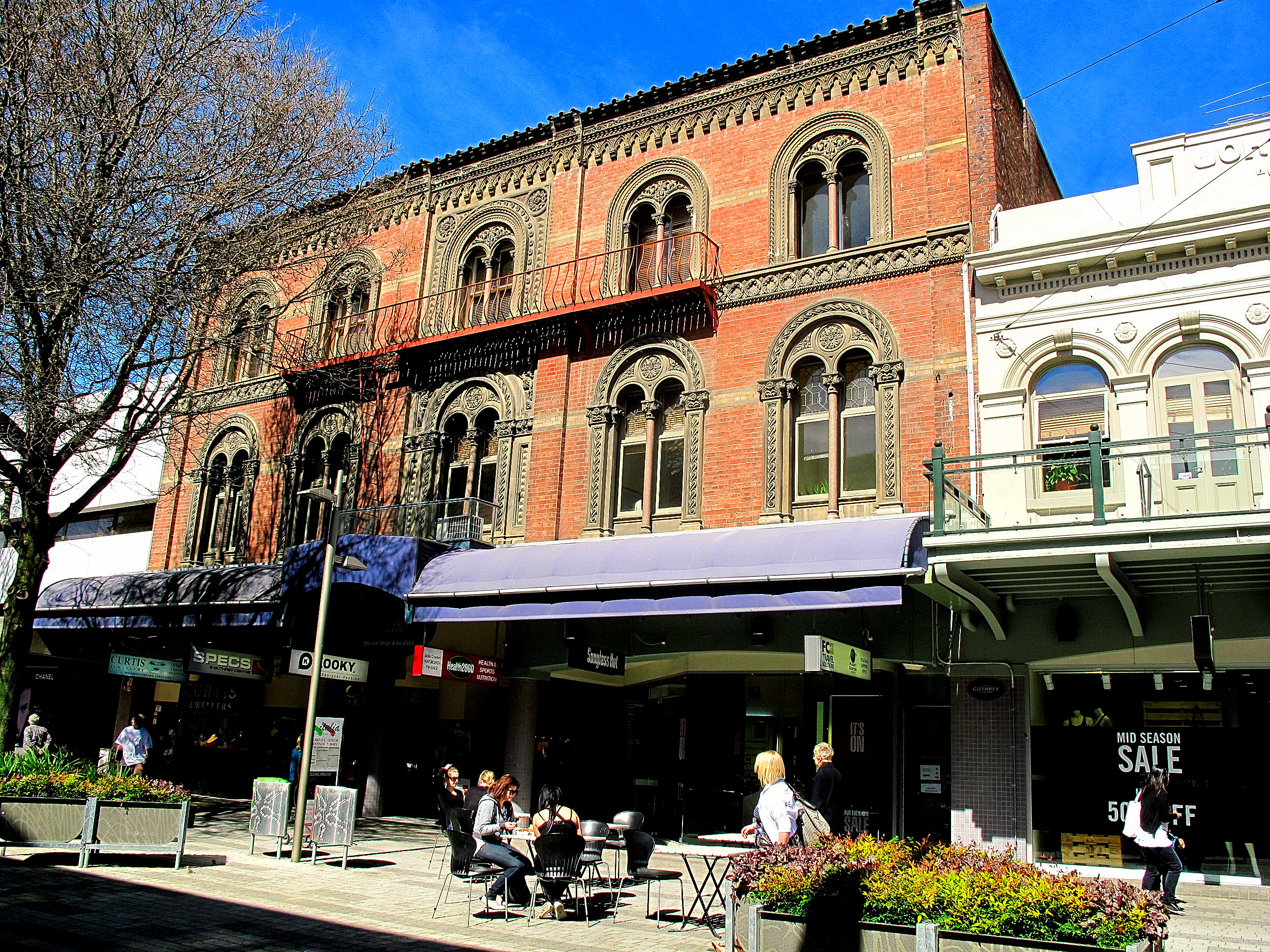
- The Guthrey Centre in 2010
- Interactive map of the Guthrey Centre area

General information
- Type: Office building and shops
- Architectural style: Venetian Renaissance
- Location: Christchurch Central City, 126 Cashel Street, Christchurch, New Zealand
- Coordinates: 43.5333°S 172.6354°E
- Completed: 1881
- Demolished: August 2011
- Client: John Anderson

Design and construction
- Architect: William Armson

Heritage New Zealand – Category 1
- Designated: 5 September 1985
- Reference no.: 3669

References
- "Guthrey Centre". New Zealand Heritage List/Rārangi Kōrero. Heritage New Zealand.

The Guthrey Centre at 126 Cashel Street, Christchurch Central City, originally the offices of Andersons Foundry and later 'Andersons Ltd, was a Category I heritage building registered by the New Zealand Historic Places Trust. The building was demolished following severe damage from the February 2011 Christchurch earthquake.

== History ==
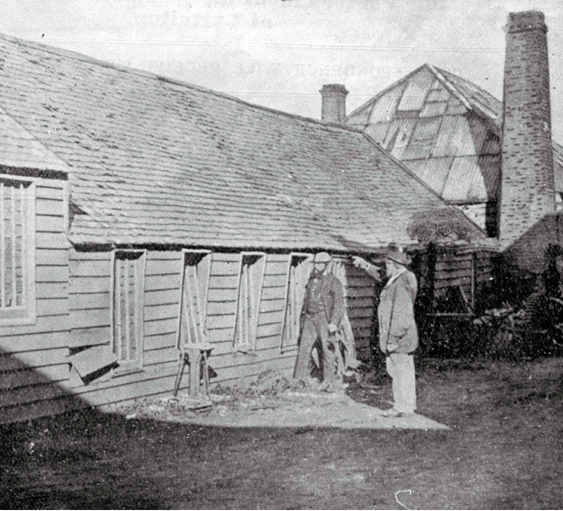
Anderson's Foundry, which was behind the office building, in ca 1900. John Anderson and his foreman A. Kirk are in the photo

John Anderson (1820–1897) was one of the original "Pilgrims" of Christchurch, having arrived on Sir George Seymour in 1850. He was a blacksmith and in February 1852, he purchased section 877 for £12 in Cashel Street. This is the site where what would become the Guthrey Centre was to be built. He later purchased land on the north side of Cashel Street to build his family home, which he named Inveresk after his place of birth.

The business expanded and by 1857, Anderson had added a foundry to his blacksmith shop. The production facilities were at the back of the site towards Lichfield Street. In 1866, with his new gained wealth, he could send his sons John and Andrew to Edinburgh for schooling at the highly regarded Merchiston Castle School. Both started their working career in Scotland, with John as a mechanical engineer in Glasgow, and Andrew as a civil engineer in Edinburgh. Upon their respective returns to New Zealand in 1873 and 1876, they worked in their father's business. In 1881, Anderson retired from the company, passing management on to John and Andrew.

From small beginnings, the business had grown to cover all sorts of engineering. Machinery was produced that would process the region's products. The company expanded after Anderson's retirement and became a major player in the production of railway hardware, road and rail bridges. A Lyttelton works was opened in 1887 to build and maintain vessels. The firm built gold dredges and the steel lighthouse for Farewell Spit (1895–1896).

The Anderson's office building was constructed around 1881. It was to hold the offices for the production facilities, and offered shops facing Cashel Street.

The building was demolished following severe damage from the February 2011 Christchurch earthquake. The Canterbury Earthquake Heritage Building Trust Board had tried to save the building and offered a grant to the owner, Peter Guthrey, son of former mayor Ron Guthrey. However, the "costs had not stacked up", said Guthrey.

== Architecture ==
The building was designed by William Armson (1832/3 – 1883). From 1870 until his death, he was the dominant commercial architect in Christchurch. Andersons Foundry was a fine example of Venetian Renaissance architecture. The building was significant due to the fine façade and because few of Armson's buildings had survived until today.

== Heritage listing and awards ==
The Guthrey Centre was listed as a Category I heritage building by the New Zealand Historic Places Trust on 5 September 1985. It received an award from the New Zealand Institute of Architecture four years later.
