= Excelsior Hotel, Christchurch =

Excelsior Hotel
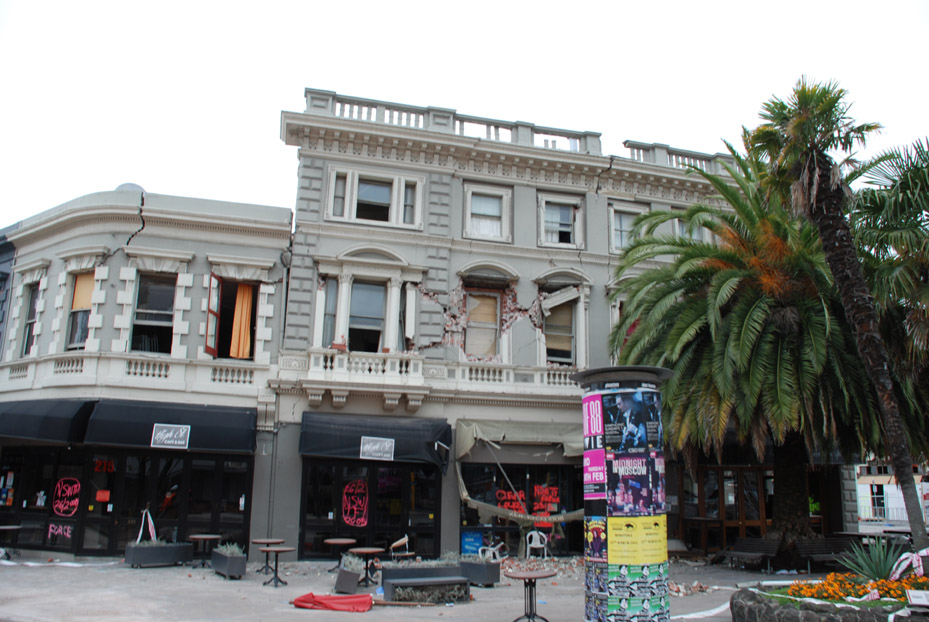
- Excelsior Hotel in March 2011 with significant earthquake damage

General information
- Type: Hotel
- Location: Christchurch Central City, 120 Manchester Street, Christchurch, New Zealand
- Coordinates: 43°32′05.5″S 172°38′23.5″E
- Completed: 1882
- Demolished: 10 April 2016

Technical details
- Floor count: three

Design and construction
- Architect: William Armson

Heritage New Zealand – Category 1
- Designated: 16 November 1989
- Reference no.: 4390

References
- "Excelsior Hotel". New Zealand Heritage List/Rārangi Kōrero. Heritage New Zealand.

The Excelsior Hotel in 120 Manchester Street, Christchurch, originally the Borough Hotel, in recent years known as Excelsior Backpackers or New Excelsior Backpackers, was a Category I heritage building in central Christchurch. It was designed by then most prominent architect, William Armson, and was one of the few remaining examples of his work in the city. It was heavily damaged in the February 2011 Christchurch earthquake, and all but its western façade was demolished after the earthquakes. The remaining part was demolished in April 2016.

== History ==
A hotel was first built on the site in 1865, called the Harp of Erin. It was renamed the Borough Hotel in 1870, and was subsequently known as Barrett's Family Hotel after it was purchased by John Barrett in 1878. On Boxing Day in 1879, Orangemen who paraded along Manchester Street on their way to the railway station were attacked by Irish Catholics outside Barrett's Hotel, resulting in several men being taken to hospital. A similar attack happened in Timaru around the same time. Rumours started that the attack was planned at Barrett's hotel and that he himself was involved and he was arrested on 30 December. Barrett lost his liquor licence over the affair and, in order to restore his reputation, had the old building pulled down.

Barrett engaged William Armson, then one of the foremost architects, to design a new hotel. He had employed Armson before for the Durham Arms, a building at 328 Durham Street demolished sometime after 2000. The new hotel was built in 1881 or 1882, and in 1906, the name changed to Excelsior Hotel.

The building was purchased by the Christchurch Heritage Trust in 1997 to save it from demolition. It was heavily damaged in the February 2011 Christchurch earthquake, but there are plans to rebuild it. It was again bought by the Christchurch Heritage Trust in July 2011 so that it might be restored. The western façade of the historic building was to be retained. The Christchurch Heritage Trust sold the site to developers Miles Yeoman and Craig Newbury as they needed the money to concentrate on the renovations of the Trinity Congregational Church and Shand's Emporium. The new owners had the remaining façade demolished on 10 April 2016 and plan to build a replica of the Excelsior Hotel.

== Architecture and fittings ==
The brick and plaster building was three-storey, with balustrades and a rusticated stonework façade. Its exterior window frames were decorative. Those on the first floor facing north were a three-window grouping that features a centralized segmental pediment.

== Heritage registration ==
The Excelsior Hotel was registered as a Category I heritage building by Heritage New Zealand (previously known as the New Zealand Historic Places Trust).
