= St Peter's Church, Akaroa =

Church in Akaroa, Banks Peninsula, New Zealand

- St Peter's Church
- St Peter's Church, Akaroa
- 43°48′21″S 172°58′04″E
- Location: 10 Rue Balguerie, Akaroa
- Country: New Zealand
- Denomination: Anglican

History
- Status: Church
- Founded: 10 October 1852
- Founder: Rev. William Josiah Aylmer
- Dedication: Saint Peter
- Consecrated: 27th November 1864

Architecture
- Functional status: Active
- Architects: Samuel Farr; Arthur Purchas (unconfirmed)
- Architectural type: Church
- Style: Gothic Revival
- Completed: October 1852 (original); 1863 (later building

Administration
- Diocese: Christchurch
- Parish: Akaroa

St Peter's Anglican Church is a heritage-listed anglican church located on Rue Balguerie, Akaroa, Banks Peninsula, New Zealand. It is one of the oldest churches in the Canterbury region. The original church building, designed by architect Samuel Farr in 1852, was located on Church Street of Akaroa. A larger building was commissioned in the 1860s and completed construction in 1863 on a plot of donated land at its current Rue Balguerie address.

The church likely takes its name from the apostle Saint Peter.
