= John Anderson (mayor) =

New Zealand blacksmith and businessman (1820–1897)

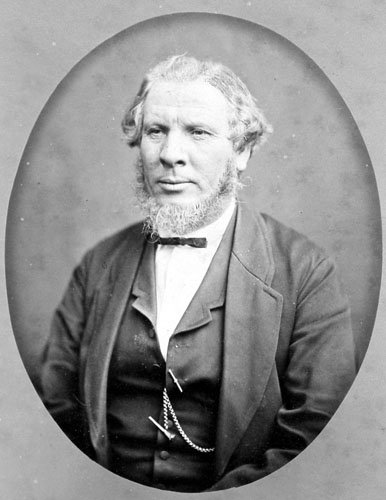
- John Anderson

2nd Mayor of Christchurch
- In office 16 Dec 1868 – 15 Dec 1869
- Preceded by: William Wilson
- Succeeded by: Andrew Duncan

Personal details
- Born: 7 November 1820 Inveresk
- Died: 30 April 1897 (aged 76) Christchurch Central City
- Spouse: Jane Anderson (née Gibson)
- Relations: John Elmslie (son-in-law)
- Children: Four sons (incl. John Anderson, Jnr), two daughters
- Profession: Blacksmith, engineer, businessman, local politician

John Anderson (7 November 1820 – 30 April 1897) was the second Mayor of Christchurch in New Zealand 1868–1869, and a successful businessman. He had a close connection with three buildings (his office building, later known as the Guthrey Centre; St Andrew's Church, which is these days located at Rangi Ruru; St Paul's Church) that have later received Category I heritage registrations by Heritage New Zealand. Two of these buildings were demolished following the February 2011 Christchurch earthquake.

His company became even more successful under the leadership of two of his sons, and it existed until 1986.

== Early life ==
Anderson was born on 7 November 1820 in Inveresk, near Edinburgh in Scotland. He was the son of Alexander Anderson (a ploughman) and his wife Jean Harper.

He was married to Jane Gibson on 3 June 1845. Before her marriage, his wife was employed by the Dalmahoy family, who later helped their desire of emigrating to New Zealand by advancing £300 for the move. Their first two children, Marion and Alexander, died as infants, and this is believed to have been a stimulus for them to emigrate.

Their third child John was born in 1850 and the family of three came out to New Zealand on one of the First Four Ships, Sir George Seymour, arriving in Lyttelton at 10 am on Tuesday, 17 December 1850.

A fourth child, Andrew, was born in 1851. Jean Harper Anderson was born in 1853 and married the Very Rev Dr John Elmslie in 1881. Alexander, Elizabeth and Frederick were born between 1853 and 1861.

== Professional life ==
In Scotland, Anderson learned the trade of a blacksmith. Following this, he was employed by railway companies.

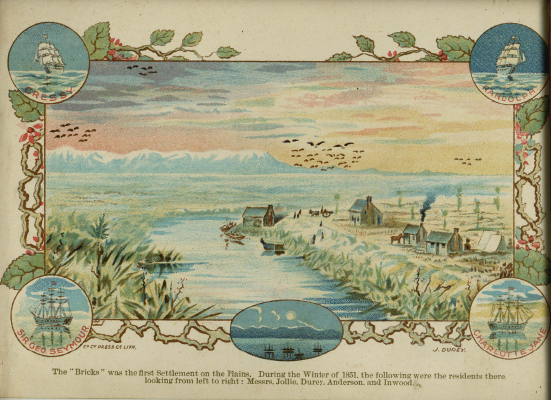
The Bricks on the southern bank of the Avon River. The second hut from the right belonged to Anderson. The inserts show the First Four Ships that landed the colonists in 1850. Painted by John Dury (third hut from the right) in 1851

In New Zealand, he settled at The Bricks 43.52540°S 172.64510°E, a locality on the Avon River in central Christchurch, representing the most upstream location that could be reached by boat in those days. He was influenced by John Deans to settle in Christchurch rather than in Lyttelton, where most of the other settlers established themselves. Anderson was a neighbour with the surveyor Edward Jollie, who lived in the leftmost hut shown in the Drury painting.

In February 1852, Anderson moved slightly south to Cashel Street, where he had bought a section. He bought up more land between Cashel Street and Lichfield Street for his expanding company. His residence 'Inveresk' was built further east on Cashel Street opposite St Paul's Church.

In 1866, Anderson sent his sons John and Andrew to Edinburgh for schooling at the highly regarded Merchiston Castle School. Both started their working career in Scotland, with John as a mechanical engineer in Glasgow, and Andrew as a civil engineer in Edinburgh. Upon their respective returns to New Zealand in 1873 and 1876, they both worked in their father's business.

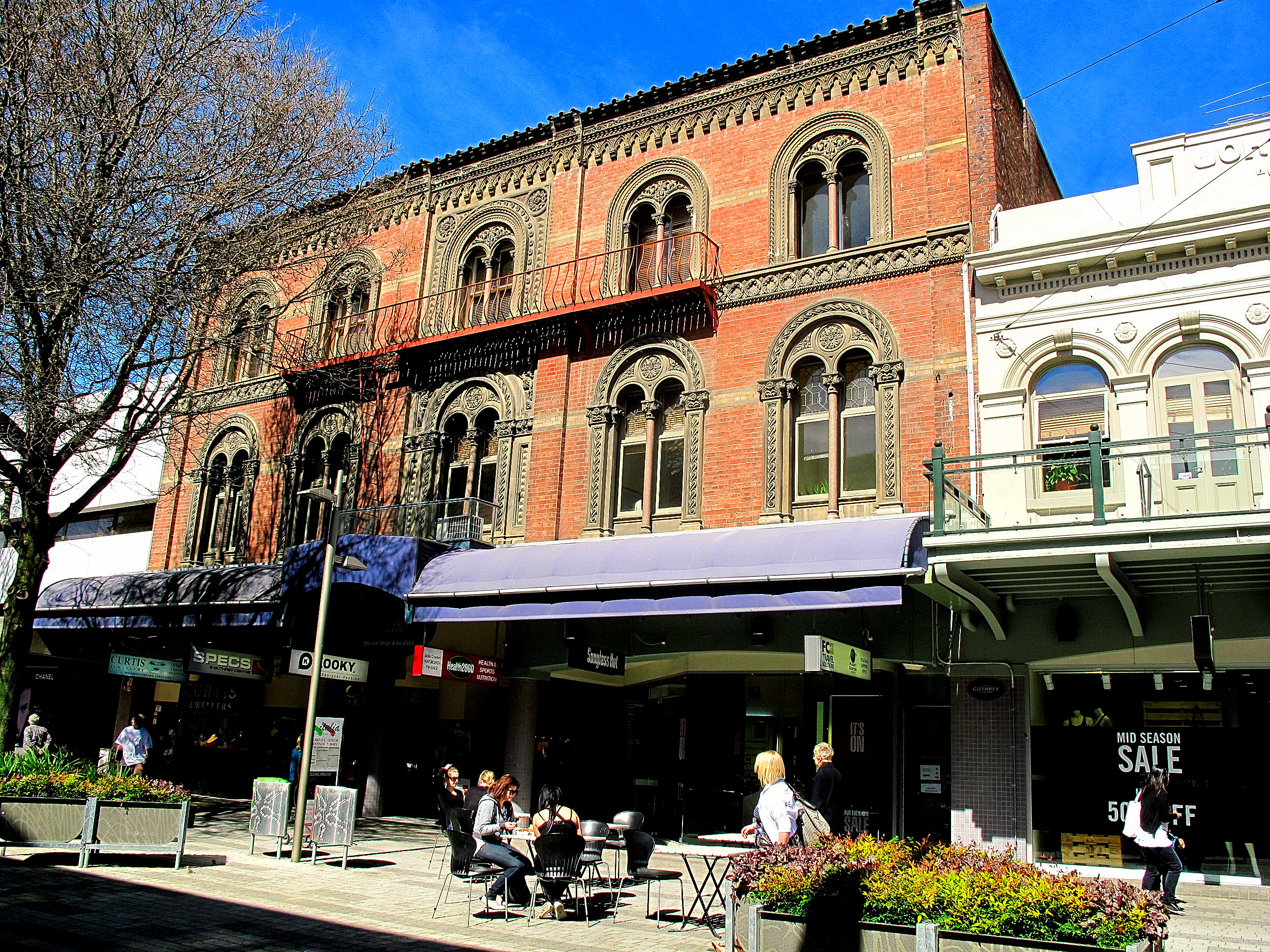
The Guthrey Centre in 2010

In 1881, Anderson retired from the company, passing management on to John and Andrew. In the same year, the new company office was built on the Cashel Street site. It was known in later years as the Guthrey Centre and was demolished in August 2011 as a consequence of the February 2011 Christchurch earthquake. The building was listed as a Category I heritage structure with Heritage New Zealand.

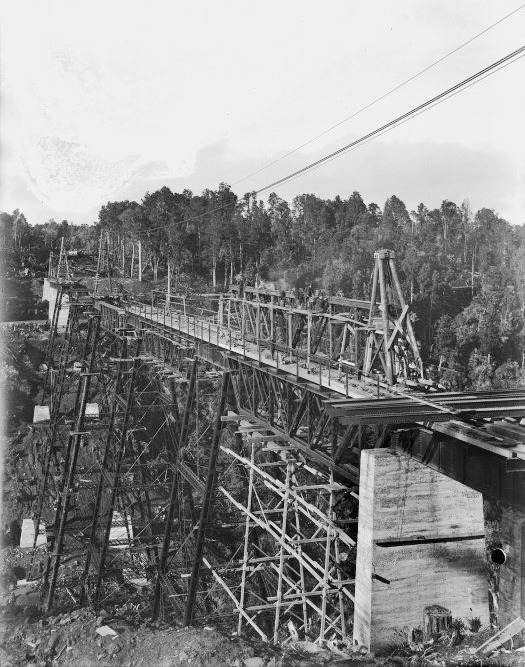
Railway viaduct at Makatote under construction in 1908

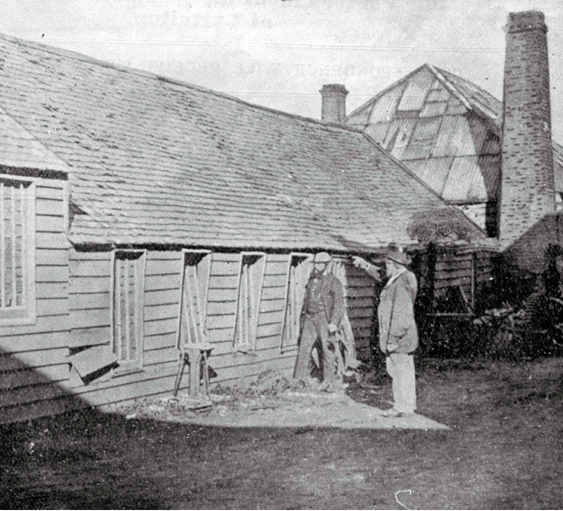
Anderson's Foundry on the south side of Cashel Street, ca 1900

From small beginnings, the business had grown to cover all sorts of engineering. Machinery was produced that would process the region's products. The company expanded after Anderson's retirement and became a major player in the production of railway hardware, road and rail bridges. A Lyttelton works was opened in 1887 to build and maintain vessels. The firm built gold dredges and the steel lighthouse for Farewell Spit (1895–1896).

One example of significant bridges was the Beaumont road bridge over the Clutha River, which is also known as the Dunkeld Bridge, as this was the original survey name for the township that soon took the name of Beaumont. The bridge was opened by John Anderson on 4 March 1887 with a champagne lunch. A champagne lunch of such proportions that the location for the presentation is still called Champagne Flat was held at the opening of the Waiau Ferry Bridge, these days a Category I heritage item registered with Heritage New Zealand. Another early and outstanding bridge was the Waiteti Viaduct, the northernmost viaduct on the North Island Main Trunk railway a few kilometres south of Te Kūiti. This structure was also completed in 1887. Probably the most significant structure on the North Island Main Trunk Railway is the Makatote Viaduct 12 km south of National Park. At 79 m, it is the highest on this line. It took three years to build and Andrew Anderson moved his family to the construction village, so that he could oversee the work. The viaduct was commissioned in 1908.

For a long time, the company was under family membership, with all employees known to management by name, fostering a good employee / management relationship. Andersons Ltd merged with Mason Brothers Ltd in 1964 and ceased trading in 1986.

== Political career ==
In 1862, the first municipal council of Christchurch was elected. 20 citizens put their names forward, and Anderson had the second highest number of votes, after John Hall, who later became a Premier of New Zealand.

Elections for Christchurch City Council were held annually. He was elected on several subsequent occasions: 1867–1869 and 1871. On 16 December 1868, the city council held its annual general meeting. In those days, the councillors elected one of their group as mayor at an annual meeting, i.e. the position was not elected at large (by the voting public) as is the case today. Councillor Anderson was elected unanimously as the second mayor of Christchurch.

His time as mayor is best remembered for him hosting the visit to Christchurch by the young Prince Albert, Duke of Edinburgh. The welcoming procession march was led by Anderson's foundry staff. As mayor, he presided at the official welcome luncheon. He carried out his duties to such satisfaction that citizens presented him with a silver tea and coffee service afterwards.

In 1881, the year when Anderson retired from his business, he stood as a parliamentary candidate for Christchurch South. Two candidates contested the seat, and Anderson was beaten by John Holmes, who had a majority of 113 votes.

== Presbyterian Church ==
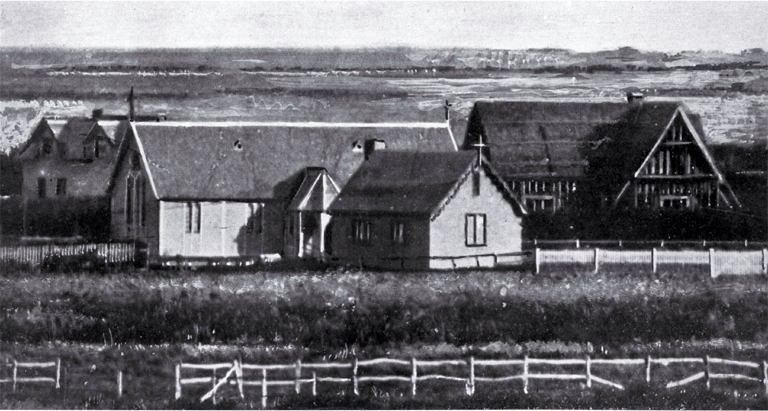
St Andrew's Church in 1858 in its original location opposite the hospital

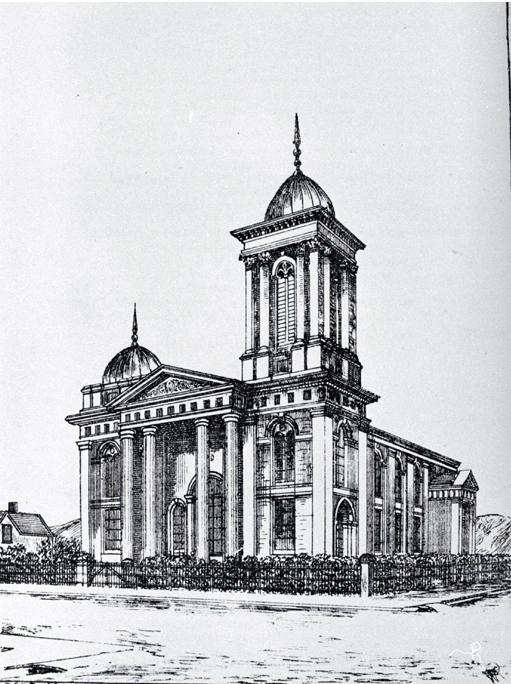
St Paul's Presbyterian Church in 1885

The Andersons were one of five Scottish settler families in Canterbury. Anderson was very active in the Presbyterian Church. He made long trips through Canterbury, trying to establish new congregations. In 1854, he was a founding member of the congregation of St Andrew's Church, and a request for a minister was sent to Scotland. In response, the first Presbyterian minister, the Rev. Charles Fraser (1823–1886), came to Canterbury in 1856. The crown had granted land at the corner of Tuam Street and Oxford Terrace (43.53490°S 172.62720°E) for the church, and St Andrew's was opened on 1 February 1857.

In 1858, Fraser established Addington Cemetery (43.54350°S 172.62360°E) in Addington as a public burial ground. It was often called the 'Scotch Cemetery' because of its links to the Presbyterian Church, but it was open to all denominations and was thus the first 'public' cemetery in Christchurch. The cemetery was eventually taken over by the Christchurch City Council.

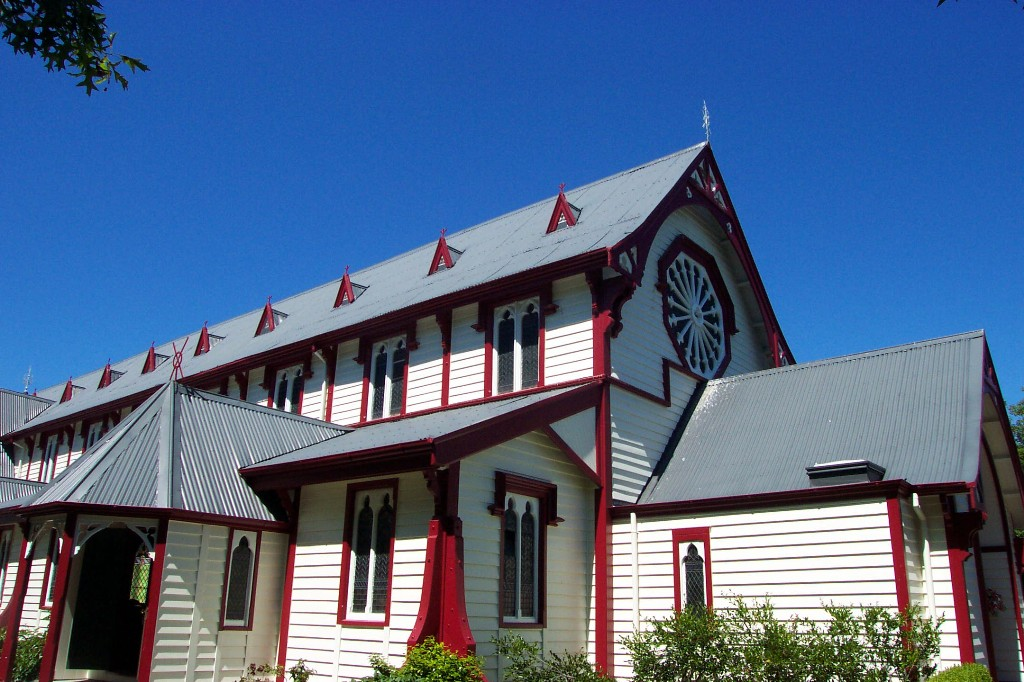
St Andrews Church in 2005, located at Rangi Ruru

When Fraser's more liberal views clashed with those of his congregation, Anderson was the leading person for forming the second congregation, and he laid the foundation stone at the new St Paul's Church. With two others, he travelled to Wanganui, trying and succeeding to attract Rev John Elmslie to St Paul's. Anderson's oldest daughter, Jean, was married to Elmslie in 1881, with the reception at their house Inveresk. The church was damaged in the 2010 Canterbury earthquake, and partially collapsed in the February 2011 Christchurch earthquake. By June 2011, St Paul's had been demolished. St Paul's was listed as a Category I heritage building by the New Zealand Historic Places Trust.

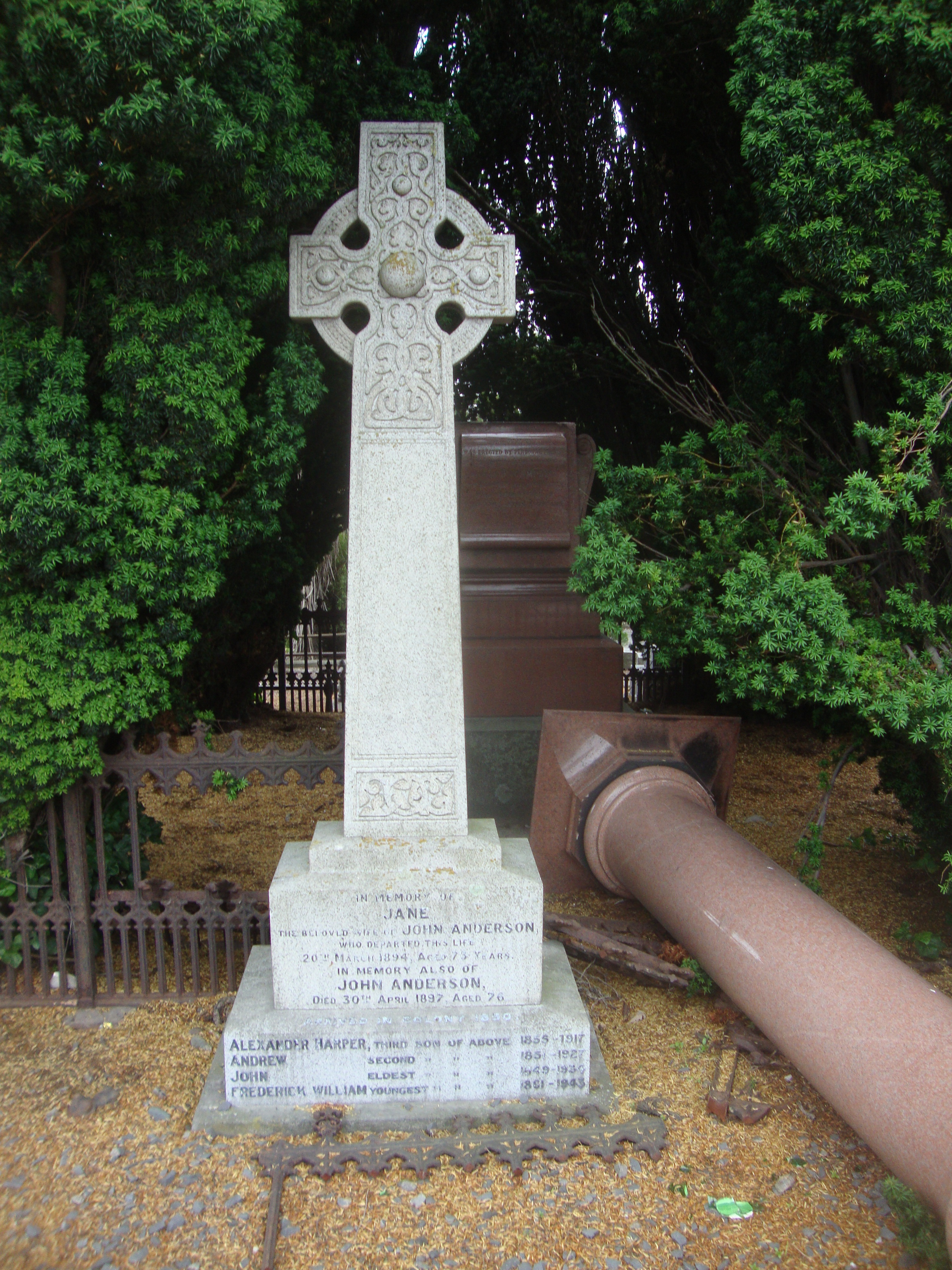
John Anderson grave at Addington Cemetery

Although Canterbury was an Anglican settlement, the first three mayors were all Presbyterian Scotsmen—William Wilson in 1868, followed by John Anderson in 1869 and Andrew Duncan in 1870.

St Andrew's Church was relocated from its original site to Rangi Ruru Girls' School in 1986. The church is listed as a Category I heritage building by the New Zealand Historic Places Trust with registration number 304.

== Death and legacy ==
Jane Anderson died on 20 March 1894, aged 73. The funeral service was held at St Paul's two days later.

Anderson died on 30 April 1897 at his residence Inveresk in Cashel Street in central Christchurch. He was survived by four sons and two daughters. The funeral service for Anderson was held at St Paul's. The Andersons are both buried at Addington Cemetery.

In 1997, Anderson was inducted into the New Zealand Business Hall of Fame.

Political offices
Preceded by William Wilson	Mayor of Christchurch; 1868–1869	Succeeded by Andrew Duncan
