= Cranmer Centre =

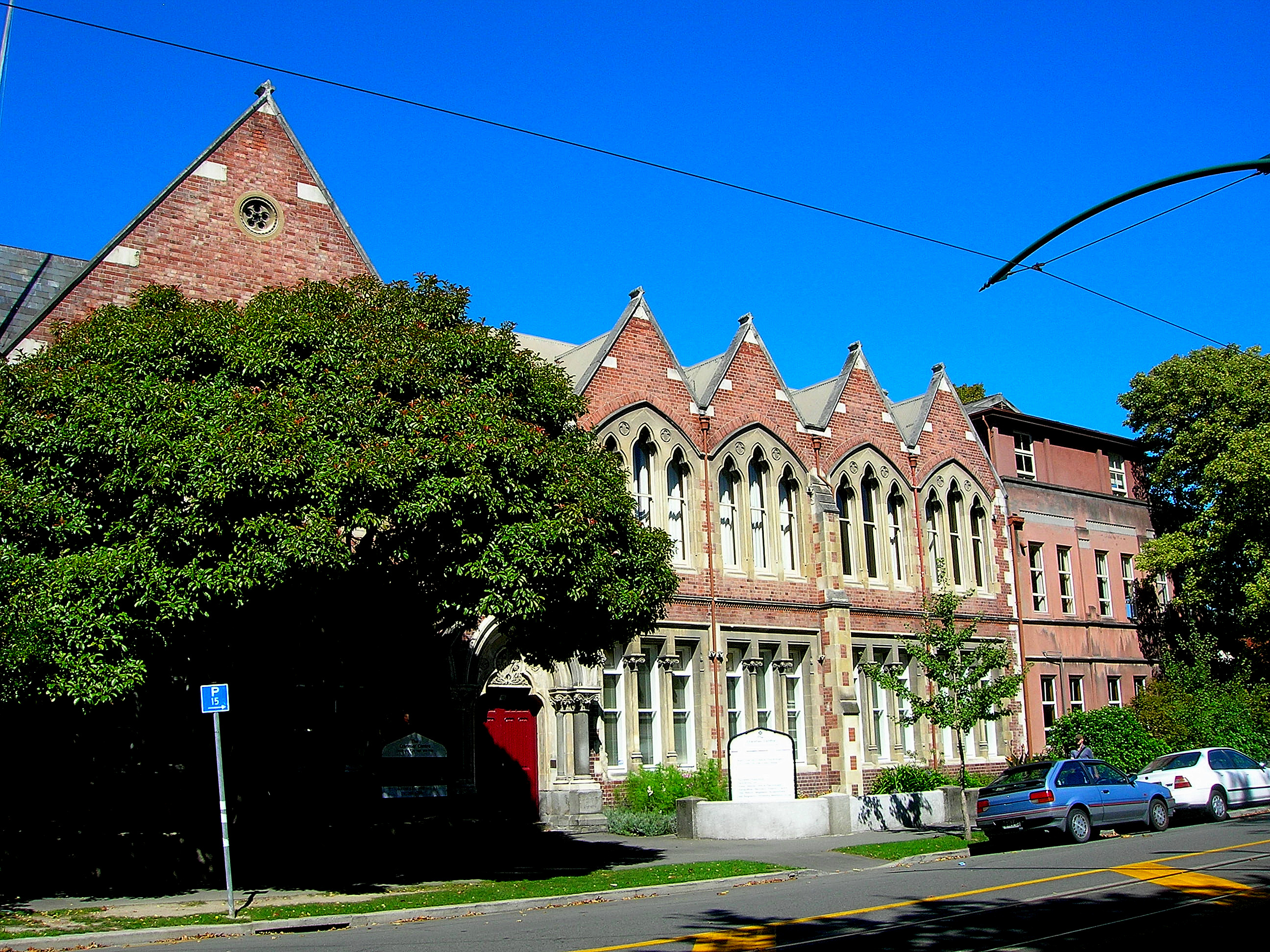
- Cranmer Centre, 2009

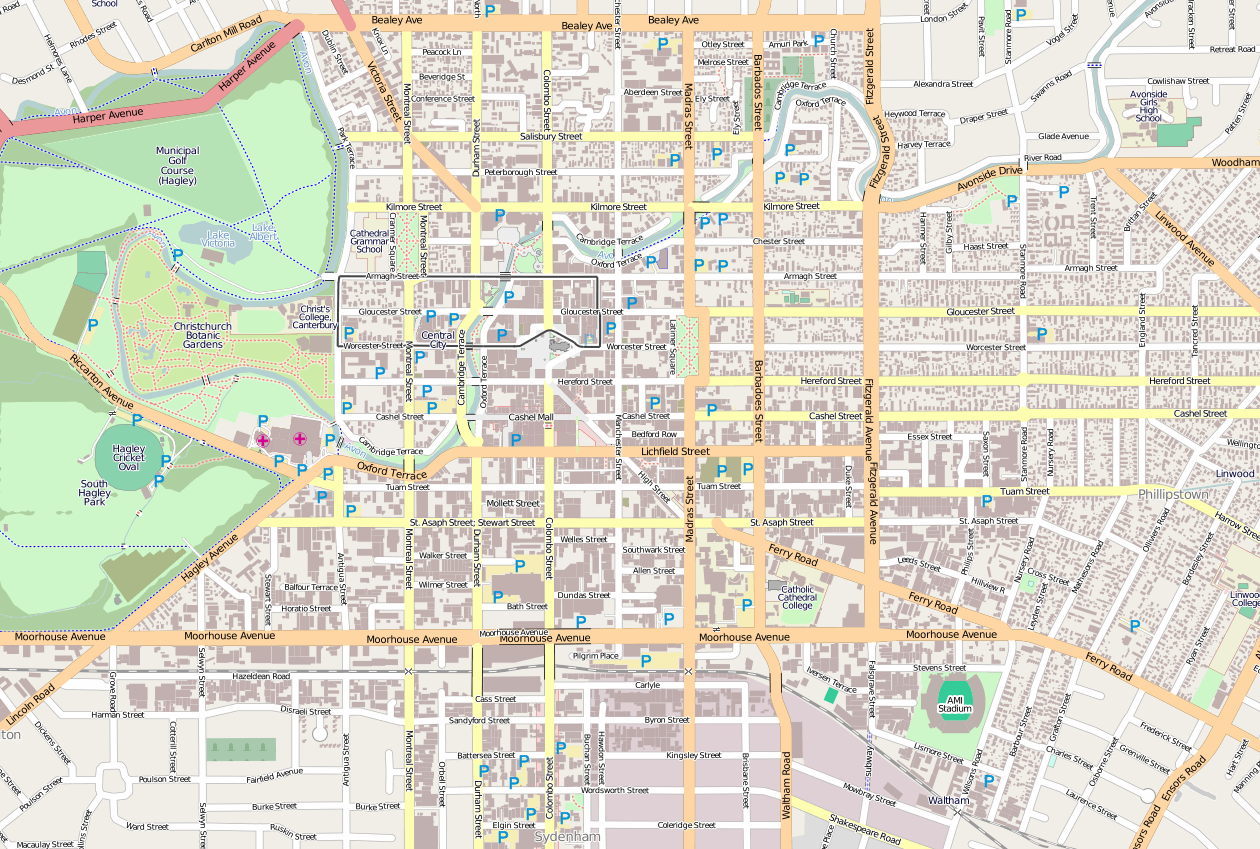
- Location within Christchurch
- Former names: Christchurch Girls' High School building

General information
- Type: Former school
- Architectural style: Venetian Gothic architecture
- Location: Christchurch Central City, 40 Armagh Street, Christchurch, New Zealand
- Coordinates: 43°31′44″S 172°37′48″E
- Completed: September 1881
- Destroyed: May 2011
- Owner: Arts Centre of Christchurch Trust

Technical details
- Floor count: three

Design and construction
- Architect: William Barnett Armson
- Main contractor: Greig and Hunter

Renovating team
- Architects: Collins and Harman

Heritage New Zealand – Category 1
- Designated: 24 February 1994
- Reference no.: 1849

References
- "Cranmer Centre". New Zealand Heritage List/Rārangi Kōrero. Heritage New Zealand.

The Cranmer Centre (originally Christchurch Girls' High School buildings) was a historic building in Christchurch, New Zealand. Its original use, until 1986, was as the Christchurch Girls' High School, the second high school for girls in the country. Registered with the New Zealand Historic Places Trust as a Category I heritage building, it was purchased by Arts Centre of Christchurch Trust in 2001, and demolished in May 2011 following the February 2011 Christchurch earthquake.

== Geography ==
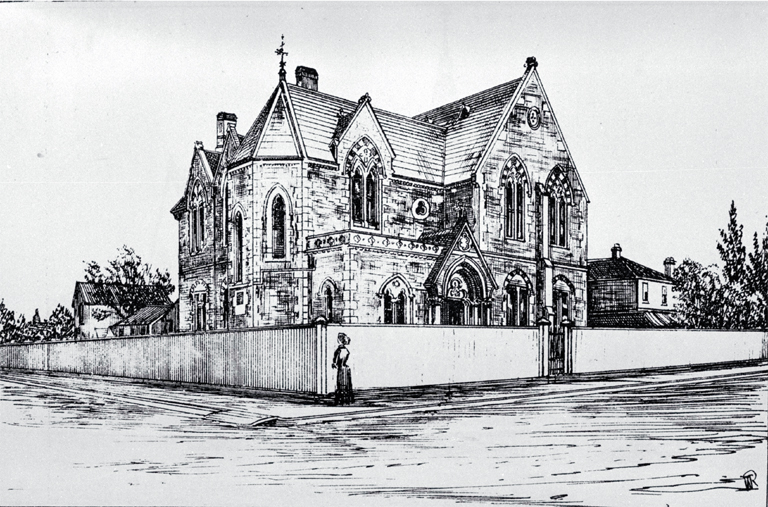
Christchurch Girls' High School, ca 1885

The centre was located on the south-west corner of Armagh and Montreal Streets by Cranmer Square. On the opposite side was the Christchurch Normal School, later renamed Cranmer Court. The Christchurch heritage tram passed the building on its central city circuit along Armagh Street.

== History ==
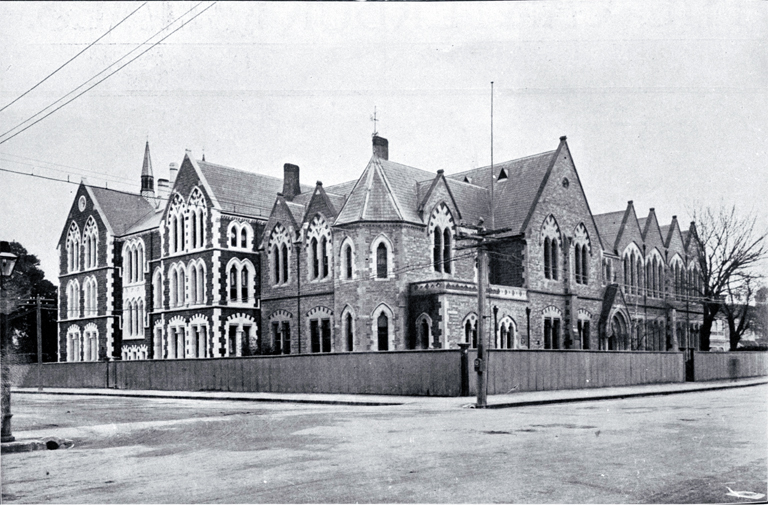
The building in 1913. The 1907 extension is to the right, with the main entrance portal relocated to that part of the building. The 1912 extension is to the left.

The Cranmer Centre is named after Cranmer Square, which takes its name from Thomas Cranmer, a noted Protestant reformer who shaped the Church of England, and wrote the first edition of the Book of Common Prayer.

Christchurch Girls' High, the second high school for girls in New Zealand, was established in 1877. It was preceded by Otago Girls' High School, which is believed to be the oldest secondary girls' school in the Southern Hemisphere. After a year in temporary accommodation, the girls school moved into new premises on the corner of Hereford Street and Rolleston Avenue designed by Thomas Cane (1830–1905), immediately adjacent to the Canterbury College. That building is these days part of the Arts Centre.

Cane's building soon ran out of room, and William Barnett Armson, who had previously been employed by the provincial council, was commissioned to design a new building in 1879. It is believed that Armson carried out the design work in 1880 and it was built the following year by the firm of Greig and Hunter. The school opened in September 1881.

Additions and renovations were made in 1907 and 1912 by Collins and Harman. Subsequent additions and alterations in 1936–1941 and 1961 were by Collins Architects.

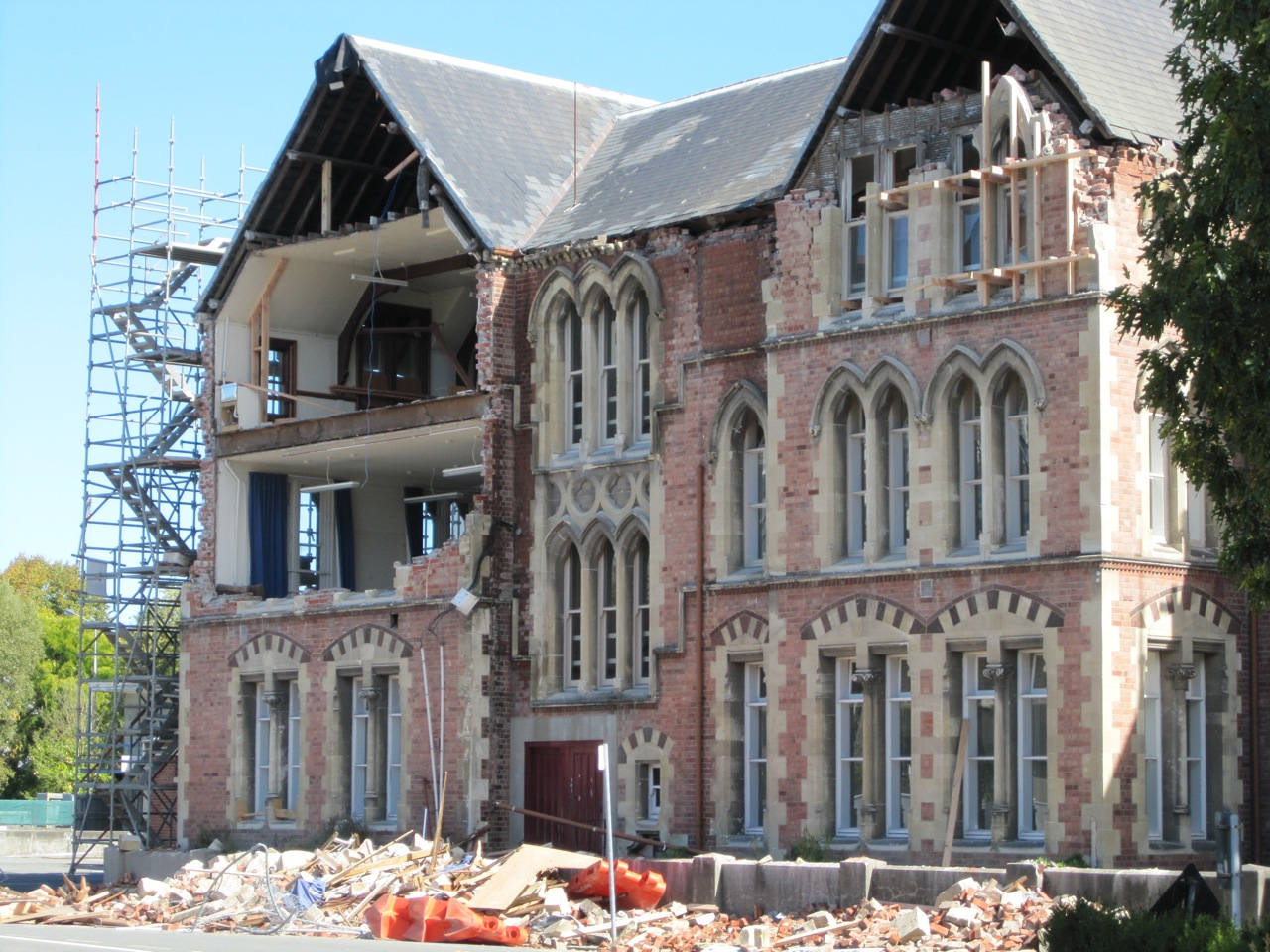
The east façade with significant damage from the February 2011 Christchurch earthquake

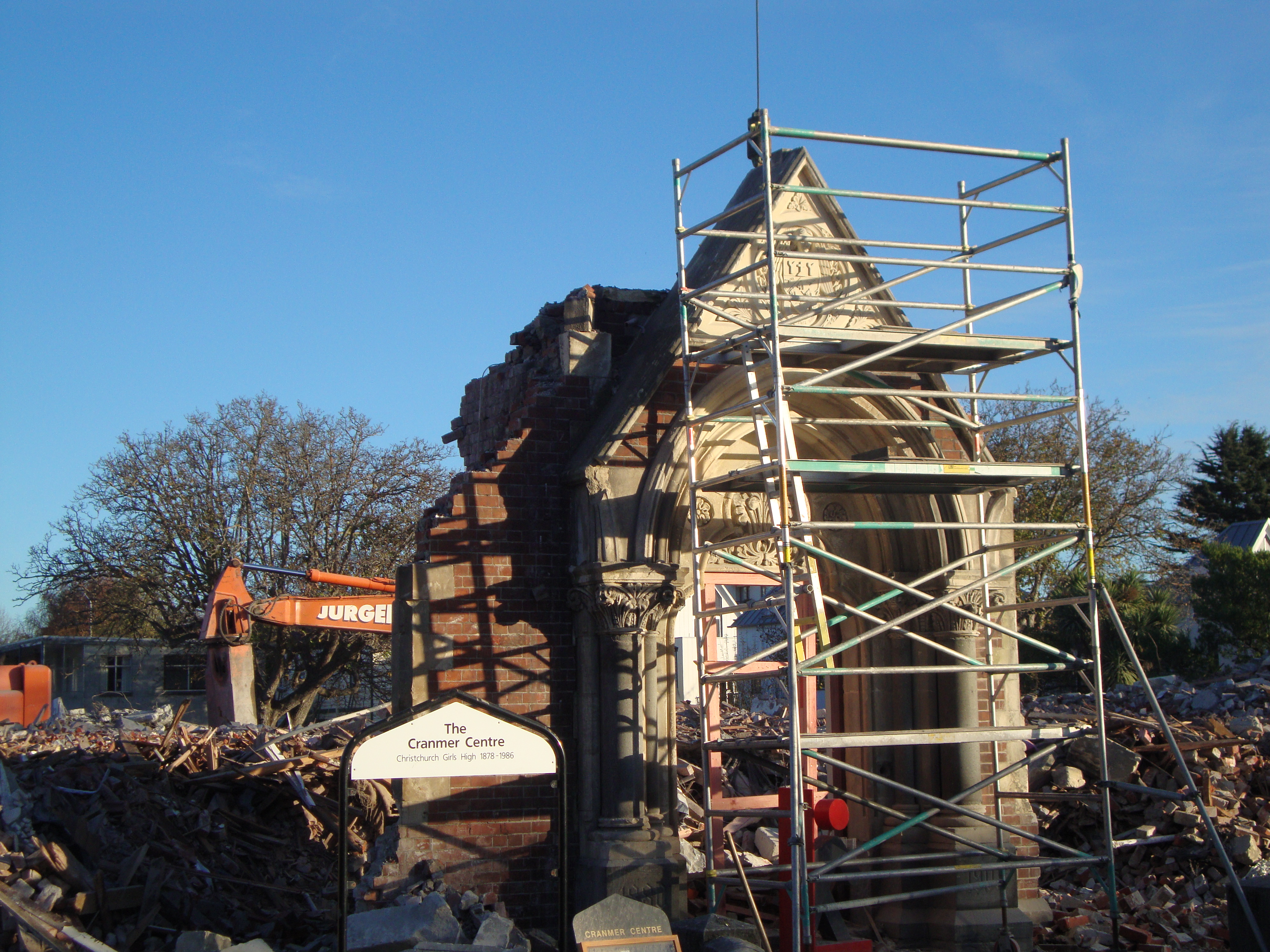
The entrance portal is all that remained of the building.

After the Girls' High School moved to its new site in Deans Avenue in 1986, the old building was leased to the Arts Centre of Christchurch Trust on a long-term lease and used for arts, cultural, social service and community groups. The Crown sold the land and buildings to Ngāi Tahu, and in 2001, it was sold to the Arts Centre of Christchurch Trust.

The building was registered under the Historic Places Act 1980, and on 24 February 1994, the structure became registered (No. 1849) with the New Zealand Historic Places Trust as a Category I heritage building.

Following the 2011 Christchurch earthquake, the building was damaged and found to contain the toxic substance asbestos. It was demolished in May 2011; all that was remaining for a while was the main entrance portal on Armagh Street, but this was removed some weeks later. Then later sold to Christ's College. In 2021 the land of the former building was put up for sale. As of 2026 it is being used as a car park.

== Architecture ==
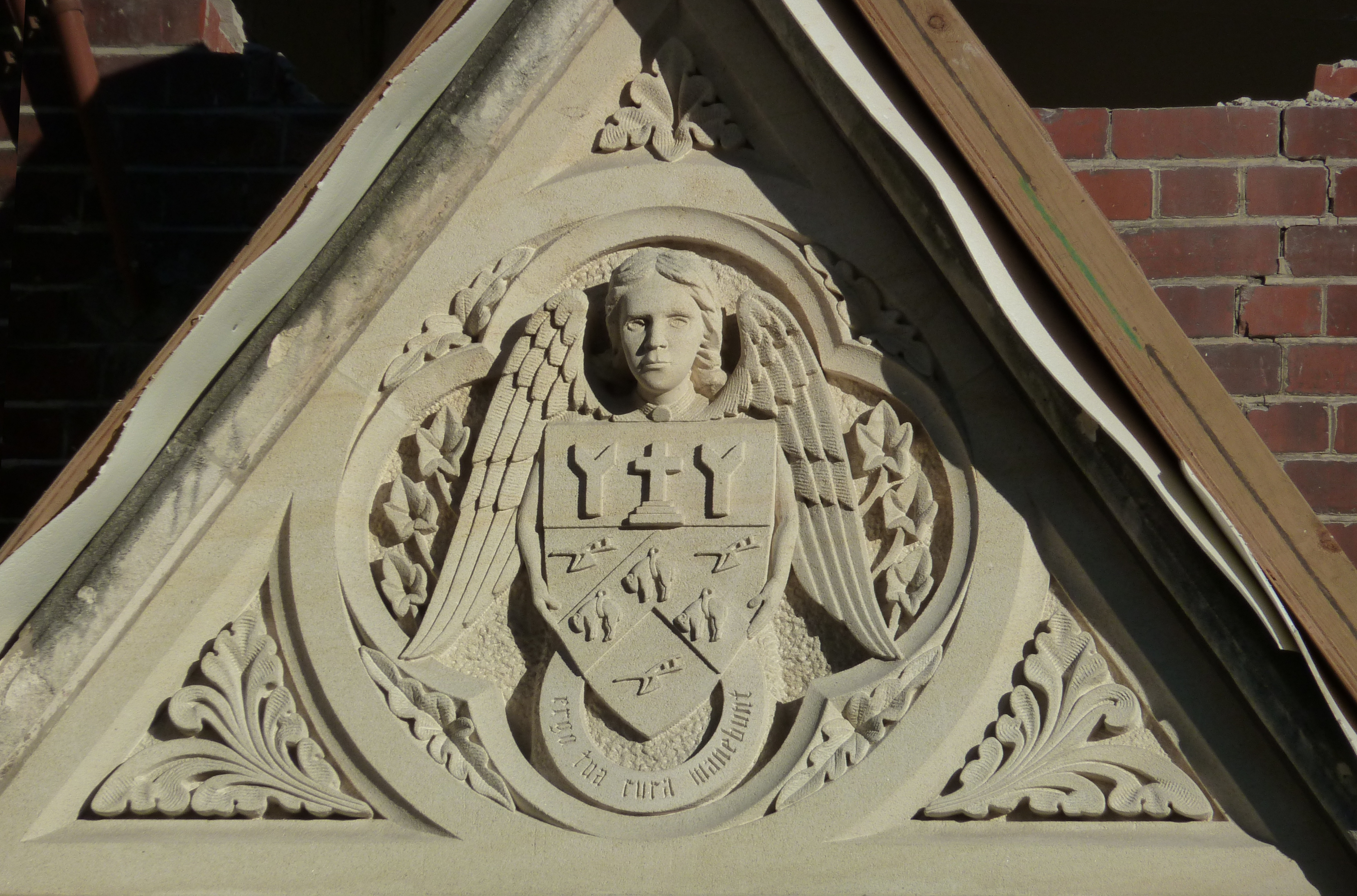
The crest of Canterbury College over the main entrance

The building was of Venetian Gothic architecture. Concrete foundations and brick masonry walls were used in the original construction as well as the additions of 1907 and 1912. External and internal walls are of brick. The windows had sandstone facing features. The roof was characterised by timber sarking and slate sheathing. Roofing over the hall/library was replaced in 1989 after a fire.

As part of the 1907 addition, the gabled entrance was relocated to the east end of the new building, while it was originally located at the northeast porch area. The entrance has Corinthian pilasters and displays the original crest of Canterbury College above the architrave, demonstrating the links that the school had with the university at its previous site. The crest is inscribed "Ergo tua rura manebunt", meaning "therefore may your fields prosper"; this refers to the then extensive landholdings that the college had been given by the provincial government that were earning it an income.

One of the building's notable feature had been constructural polychromy.
