= Sawmill Cottage =

Coordinates: 43°45′28″S 172°58′13″E

Sawmill Cottage, also known as Pavitt Cottage, is a historic timber cottage in Robinsons Bay, Banks Peninsula, New Zealand. Robinsons Bay was settled in 1850 and was extensively milled. Sawmill Cottage was constructed by either John Pavitt or Thomas Jackson Hughes, but the exact date of construction and who originally owned the cottage is an uncertainty. In 1865 both Pavitt and Hughes had died and their mills were purchased by George Saxton and Frederick Williams, who expanded the milling operation at Robinsons Bay. After the timber had been exhausted the land was used for agriculture, with the cottage being residence for farmhands. The building passed hands several times between descendants of the early settler families before eventually being subdivided from the farm and restored as a historic building. In 2023 it was registered as a category 2 building with Heritage New Zealand and the following year the Robinsons Bay Community Heritage Trust was formed to manage the property.

== Description ==
Topographic map of Robinsons Bay. Sawmill Cottage is identified by the orange star on Sawmill Road

Sawmill Cottage is located on Sawmill Road in Robinsons Bay, near Duvauchelle in the Akaroa Harbour. The cottage is constructed from both pit-sawn and machine-sawn weatherboards and has a cedar shingle roof and varying window designs. The front has a verandah. A building that served as a shop and butchers was added onto the rear of the building after c.1906.

The lean-to contains a kitchen and bathroom. The rest of the building contains a parlour, two front rooms, dining room and lounge, an attic, and four bedrooms. Originally the building contained more bedrooms.

== History ==
Robinsons Bay, 1909. The Sawmill Cottage can be seen in the left

Charles Barrington Robinson was a police magistrate and purchased land at the head of Akaroa Harbour from the French Nanto Bordelaise Company in June 1842, he left Akaroa but returned to his land in April 1850 with a group of British settlers. The settlers began work on clearing the forest to provide timber for Christchurch. Timber was originally pit sawn but in 1854 the Pavitt family with assistance from Samuel Farr constructed an 18 ft (5.5 m) waterwheel to power a mechanical saw mill. Another settler, Thomas Jackson Hughes, moved into the area that same decade and began milling, either at his own mill or at the same mill as the Pavitt family. Tensions between the two grew as Hughes obtained pasture rights for land behind the Pavitt mill. It is possible that the land Hughes obtained the rights to contained buildings owned by the Pavitt family. The Sawmill Cottage was constructed by either the Pavitt family or Hughes between 1855 and c.1861. The cottage would have been a residence for the landowners rather than the workers, who had more basic dwellings.

In 1862 Hughes complained of being unable to pass his timber to the bay. The Robinsons Bay Valley Road was constructed to address this, but the dispute continued and the provincial council sided with the Pavitt family on land-use and access. John Pavitt and Hughes died in 1865 and their land was acquired by George Saxton and Frederick Williams, who had previously been involved with milling at Le Bons Bay. Saxton and Williams established a joint milling operation with a steam-powered mill that was much larger than previous operations and employed 40 men.

By the late 1870s the land had been cleared and milling operations shut down. Saxton and Williams became shepherds, with Williams retiring in 1881 after Saxton bought him out. Williams lived in the cottage with his family until 1882 after his retirement. Farmhands Henry and Mary Ann Hayward then occupied the cottage. In 1899 the cottage and farm were sold to Christopher Bodkin Thacker and John Archer Thacker. In 1910 the property was sold to Frederick Wynn Williams and Arthur Leslie William, sons of Frederick Williams.

In 1984 Orvine Williams, another descendant of Frederick, attempted to have the building preserved as part of a scenic or historic reserve In 1986 it was sold to the Thacker family again and in 2000 the cottage was subdivided from the farm and sold to Colin Fernyhough, a descendant of John Pavitt, purchased the cottage and began restoration works. In 2003 Fernyhough transferred ownership of the cottage to a trust. Since restoration the cottage is used for community meetings and holiday accommodation. In 2023 it was registered as a category 2 building with Heritage New Zealand due to its 'aesthetic, archaeological, architectural, historical, and social significance'. The property was later transferred from the original trust to the nascent Robinsons Bay Community Heritage Trust. The trust is attempting to convert the adjacent 10 acres (4.0 ha) of council land into a heritage reserve.

Sawmill Cottage has been depicted in several artworks, including by Pavitt descendant Nancy Tichborne.
