= St Paul's Church, Christchurch =

St Paul's Church
- St Paul's Trinity Pacific Presbyterian Church
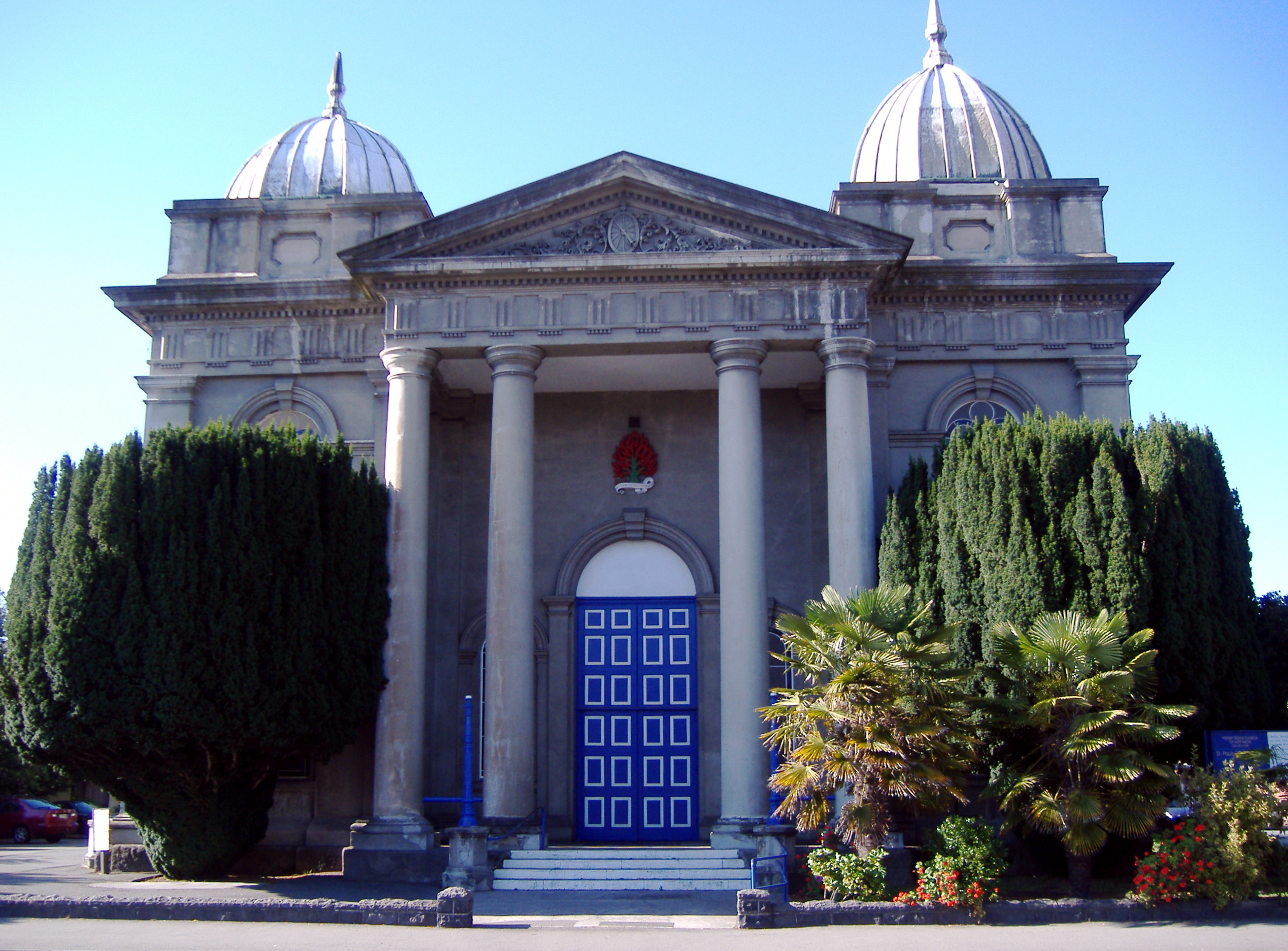
- St Paul's Church in 2007, prior to its demolition
- St Paul's Church
- 43°32′0.2″S 172°38′34.6″E
- Address: Corner Cashel and Madras Streets, Christchurch
- Country: New Zealand
- Previous denomination: Presbyterian

History
- Status: Church (former)
- Founded: 1864
- Events: 2011 Christchurch earthquake

Architecture
- Functional status: Abandoned and demolished
- Architect: Samuel Farr
- Architectural type: Church (former)
- Completed: 1877
- Closed: February 2011
- Demolished: 2011

Heritage New Zealand – Category 1
- Official name: St Paul's Church, Christchurch
- Type: Category I
- Designated: 2 April 1985
- Delisted: September 2011
- Reference no.: 305
- Type: Heritage building

St Paul's Church was a heritage-listed former Presbyterian church in Cashel Street, Christchurch. Built in 1877, the church was registered by the New Zealand Historic Places Trust as a Category I heritage building. Following the February 2011 Christchurch earthquake, the building was removed from the heritage list and demolished.

== History ==
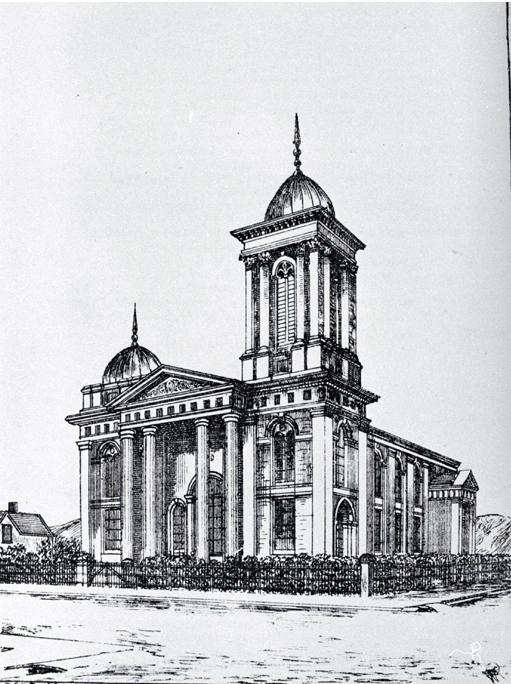
St Paul's Presbyterian Church in 1885, with its high tower that was lowered in 1962

St Paul's was built in 1877 as a Presbyterian church on the corner of Cashel and Madras Streets in the Christchurch Central City. It replaced an earlier church on the corner of Lichfield and Madras Streets built by a breakaway congregation from St Andrew's Church. Both church buildings were designed by Samuel Farr; the later one commissioned by the reverend John Elmslie. In 1969, St Paul's merged with the Trinity-Pacific Congregational Church taking on a new name – St Paul's Trinity Pacific Presbyterian Church. Rev. Leonard Jones and Kenape Faletoese lead the new multicultural church under its new format. The Palangi membership of the church declined over the next three decades and by the time of its destruction in the February 2011 earthquake, the church membership was mostly of Samoan heritage.

On 5 August 2009, the church was the victim of an arson attack that caused considerable damage. The building was restored, but suffered damage in the 2010 Canterbury earthquake, and partially collapsed in the February 2011 Christchurch earthquake. By June 2011, the church had been demolished.

== Heritage listing ==
St Paul's was listed as a Category I heritage building by the New Zealand Historic Places Trust on 2 April 1985 with registration number 305. The building was removed from the register during 2011.
