= William Armson =

Architect of colonial New Zealand

William Barnett Armson (1832/3 – 25 February 1883) was an architect, surveyor, and engineer in colonial New Zealand. A co-founder of the Canterbury Association of Architects and an architect to the provincial government, he established the architectural firm Armson, Collins and Harman in 1870. It remained active until 1993 and was one of the two oldest architectural firms in New Zealand. Armson’s most important work was the Bank of New Zealand building in Dunedin.

== Early years ==
Armson was born in London, England. His father, Francis William Armson, was a surveyor, builder, and later an architect. His mother was Jane Barnett. Armson trained in Melbourne.

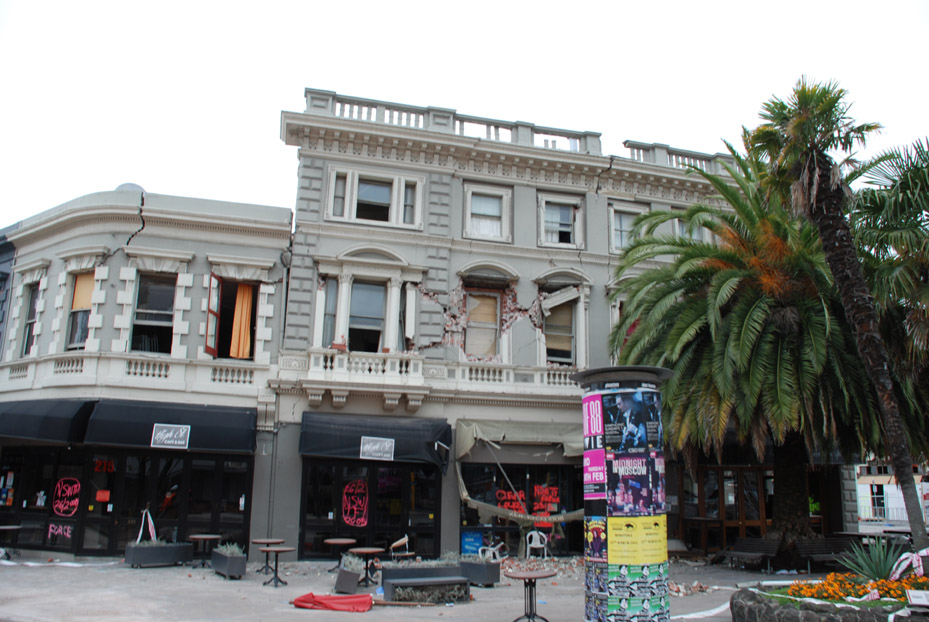
Excelsior Hotel in Christchurch

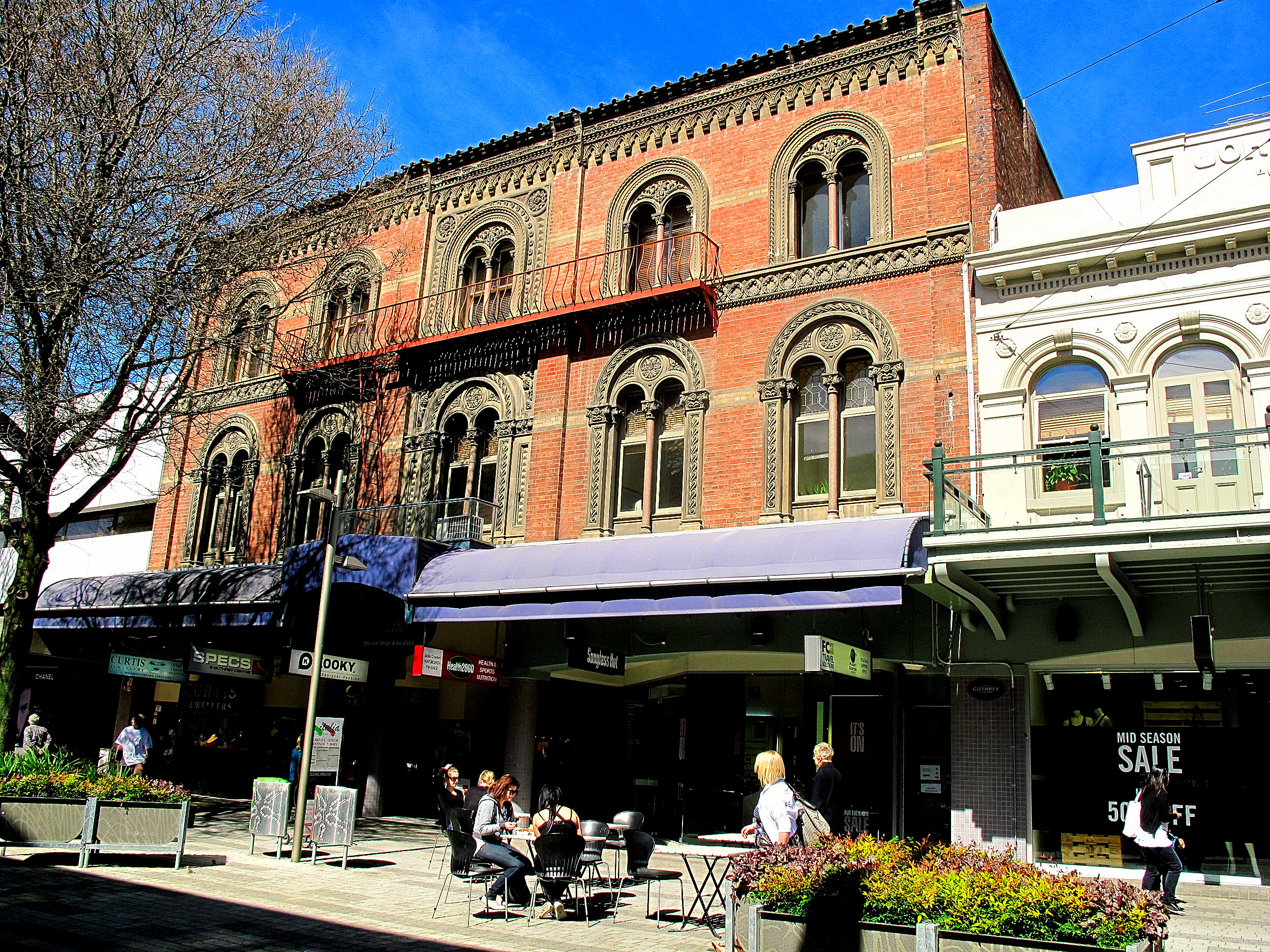
Guthrey Centre in Christchurch

== Career ==
Armson designed many buildings in New Zealand, including banks, churches, houses, offices, schools, and shops. His commercial buildings were based on a Renaissance architectural style. The banks and offices designs were notable for their "scholarly treatment" and severely correct form, providing excellent examples of Palladian School architecture.

In 1861, Armson developed an abstract for an advertising invention: "Application to street hoards of transparent sheets or panes for 'illuminated advertisements'. The invention consists of the whole or any portion of any enclosure made for the purpose of a hoard in any streets or roads during the erection of any building, or for any other purpose whatsoever, with panes or sheets of glass, or any other transparent substance, for the purpose of advertising on them by means of printing, writing, or any manner whatsoever; and also of illuminating such sheets or panes at any times by day or night by means of any kind of lamp or light whatsoever." No drawings were included with the abstract, and the patent was not granted.

Armson was a partner in the Oamaru firm of Thornley and Armson with Nathan Thornley. Their practice was as architects, civil engineers, surveyors, and land and estate agents. After the firm dissolved in 1865, Armston moved his office to No. 5, Oamaru House Chambers, Thames Street.

In Christchurch, the Cranmer Centre on Cranmer Square (then the home of Christchurch Girls' High School) and Fisher's Building on Hereford Street, both designed by Armson, were built in 1881. Another example includes the first Christchurch Boys' High School, which opened in 1881. The Excelsior Hotel building, designed by Armson and established in 1881, is a classified historic building. St Church of St. Mary in Timaru was designed by Armson. The Armson Building (also known as the John Anderson Building and later as the Guthrey Centre), designed by Armson, was also built in 1881. A Category I heritage building registered by the New Zealand Historic Places Trust, it was demolished after damage from the February 2011 Christchurch earthquake. Harald's Building on Lichfield Street was his design and was completed in 1881. The Venetian Gothic style Library Chambers building was designed by Armson in 1875.

He received a commission to design a new building for the club in 1872, but other assignments and ill health caused him to withdraw. Designed in 1879, his most important work was Dunedin's Bank of New Zealand building. Armson was a foundation member of the Canterbury Club.

== Later years ==
Armson died on 25 February 1883 in Christchurch. He was buried at Barbadoes Street Cemetery. The Macmillan Brown Library at the University of Canterbury houses many of his original drawings.

One hundred years after his death, the Christchurch Art Gallery held an exhibition of his original drawings and plans. An article in Art New Zealand, "Lost and Found: The Architecture of WB. Armson" was also published in 1983 to commemorate his work.
