= Robinsons Bay =

Coordinates: 43°45′42″S 172°57′37″E

Robinsons Bay is a settlement and bay in Akaroa Harbour on Banks Peninsula, New Zealand. Robinsons Bay was first settled in 1850 and was exploited for milling, and once the timber had run out it was converted into farming pasture. Robinsons Bay takes its name from Charles Barrington Robinson, the magistrate for Akaroa Harbour who accompanied William Hobson to Akaroa in 1840 to establish British sovereignty and control of the area.

Topographic map of Robinsons Bay

== Etymology ==
An 1841 map shows the name of the bay as Baie Robinson, indicating the bay was named after Robinson prior to his purchase of the land in 1842. The settlement would have derived its name from the bay and was recorded with the name Paka-Ayao when sold to Robinson.

c.1869 painting of Robinson's Bay by Theodore Octavius Hurt showing the impact of milling on the landscape

The bay is known as Kākakaiau in the Maori language. Maori caught flounder at the bay and the name Kākakaiau is related to the threading of caught fish with a bone needle. This name also refers to a stream that flows into the bay.

== Description ==
The Robinsons Bay settlement is located in a valley on Banks Peninsula adjacent to the eponymous sheltered bay of Akaroa Harbour.

== History ==
Robinsons Bay, 1909

Charles Barrington Robinson was a police magistrate who accompanied William Hobson aboard the Britomart to Akaroa Harbour in July 1840. Robinson hoisted the Union Jack at Green's Point and carried out magistrate duties around the Akaroa Harbour. On 3 June 1842 Robinson purchased land at the head of Akaroa Harbour from the Nanto Bordelaise Company. He left Akaroa but returned to his land in April 1850 with a group of British settlers. These settlers began work on clearing the forest to provide timber for Christchurch. Timber was originally pit sawn, but in 1854 the Pavitt family constructed a waterwheel to power a mechanical saw mill, the first one in Canterbury. Another settler, Thomas Jackson Hughes, moved into the area later that same decade and was involved in milling. Hughes got into a dispute with the Pavitt family over land rights, with the dispute leading to the formation of Robinsons Bay Valley Road. The Sawmill Cottage was constructed by either Pavitt or Hughes between 1855 and c.1861. John Pavitt and Hughes died in 1865 and their land was acquired by George Saxton and Frederick Williams, who established a joint milling operation. By the late 1870s the land had been cleared and milling operations shut down. Saxton and Williams became farmers, with Williams retiring in 1881.
