= John Anderson (engineer, born 1849) =

New Zealand engineer and international rugby union player for Scotland

- Born: John W. Anderson; 9 May 1849 Edinburgh, Scotland
- Died: 26 May 1934 (aged 85) Christchurch, New Zealand

Rugby union career
- Position: Forward
Amateur team(s)
Years	Team	Apps	(Points)
- West of Scotland
International career
Years	Team	Apps	(Points)
1872	Scotland	1	(0)

John Anderson (9 May 1849 – 26 May 1934) was a Scottish-born New Zealand engineer. He played rugby union for West of Scotland during his time in Scotland for his education and represented Scotland internationally. He lived in New Zealand from infancy and together with his brother, took over his father's company. The company flourished under their guidance and became one of New Zealand's largest builder of bridges for roads and rail.

== Early life ==
Anderson was born at Edinburgh in 1850. His father was John Anderson, who was to become mayor of Christchurch and an influential businessman. His mother was Jane Anderson (née Gibson). The Andersons emigrated to Canterbury in New Zealand at the end of 1850 on Sir George Seymour, one of the First Four Ships, and settled in Christchurch. His parents, who had married in 1845, had previously lost two children during infancy and it is thought that this contributed to their decision to emigrate; John Anderson Jr. was their only child alive at that point. Another son, Andrew, was born in 1851.

The Anderson boys received their education at Scots College in Christchurch. In 1866, they were both sent to Scotland for further education at the Merchiston Castle School in the Edinburgh suburb of Colinton. His brother then worked with a firm of civil engineers, while he himself worked at the Clutha Ironworks at Glasgow as a mechanical engineer. He furthered his education by attending classes of Professor William John Macquorn Rankine at the University of Glasgow. John Anderson returned to New Zealand in 1873; his brother followed him in 1876.

== Rugby union career ==
=== Amateur career ===
Anderson played for West of Scotland.

=== International career ===
He was capped only once for Scotland. His debut came in the second international match on 5 February 1872 playing against England at The Oval, London.

== Professional career ==
Upon his return to New Zealand, Anderson Jr. joined his father's company. 'J. Anderson, Engineer, Millwright, Boiler Maker &c' manufactured steam boilers and the plant necessary to process agricultural products. A foundry was part of the business that was located in the heart of Christchurch, between Cashel and Lichfield Streets. The firm started to really prosper when both sons worked in the business. It took on large projects, first for the Canterbury Provincial government, and then other provincial councils and also central government.

One example of a significant bridge was the Beaumont road bridge over the Clutha River, which is also known as the Dunkeld Bridge, as this was the original survey name for the township that soon took the name of Beaumont. The bridge was opened by John Anderson Jr. on 4 March 1887 with a champagne lunch. A champagne lunch of such proportions that the location for the presentation is still called Champagne Flat was held at the opening of the Waiau Ferry Bridge, these days a Category I heritage item registered with Heritage New Zealand. Another early and outstanding bridge was the Waiteti Viaduct, the northernmost viaduct on the North Island Main Trunk railway a few kilometres south of Te Kūiti. This structure was also completed in 1887. Probably the most significant structure on the North Island Main Trunk Railway is the Makatote Viaduct 12 kilometres (7.5 mi) south of National Park. At 79 metres (259 ft), it is the highest on this line. It took three years to build and Andrew Anderson moved his family to the construction village, so that he could oversee the work. The viaduct was commissioned in 1908. The company diversified by importing engines, locomotives, they built steam engines, and started building oil storage tanks once the importation of oil began.

== Other interests ==
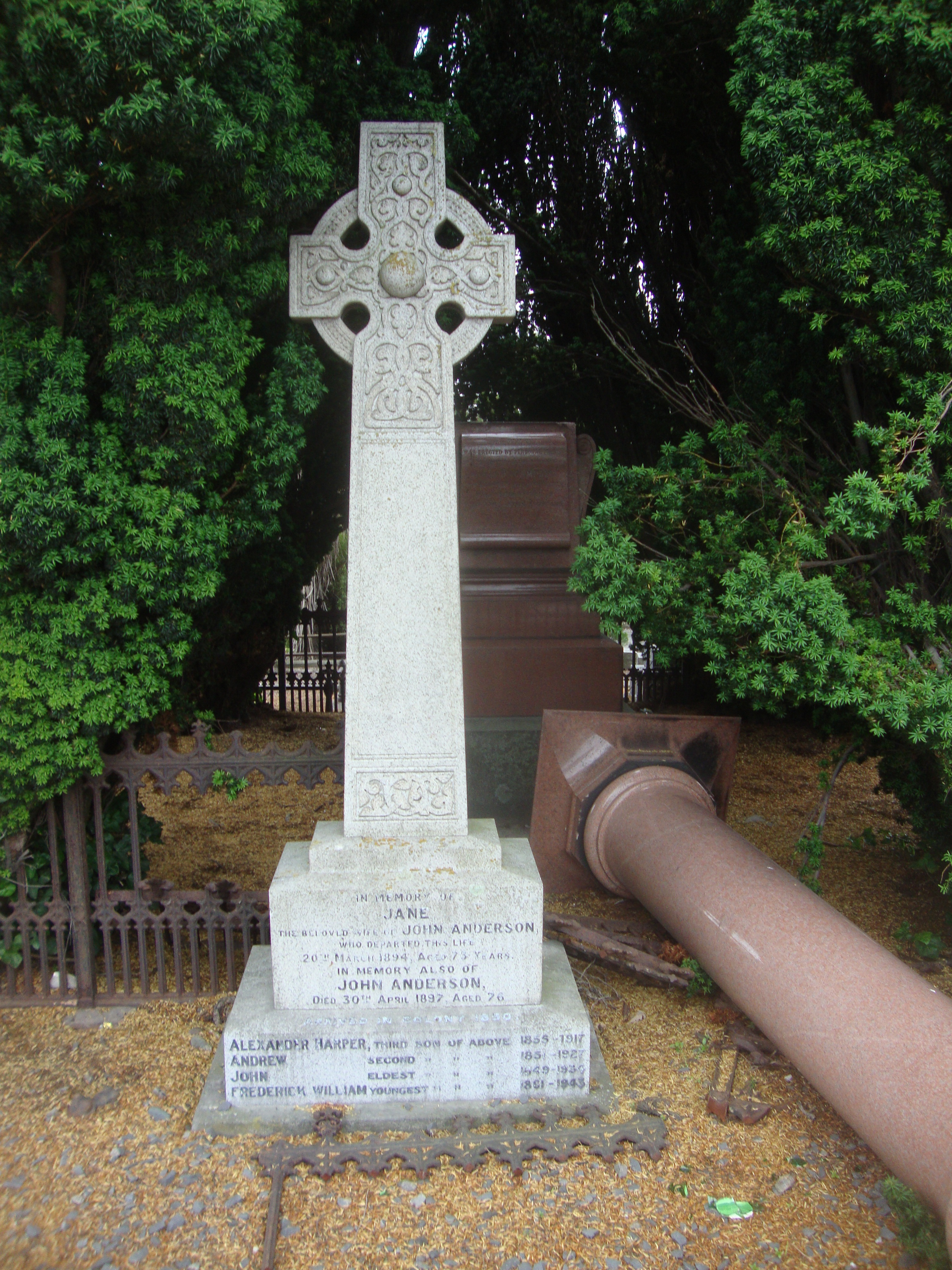
Anderson family grave at Addington Cemetery

Like his father, who was Christchurch's second mayor in 1869, Anderson Jr. was elected a member of the Christchurch City Council. In September 1892, he was declared elected unopposed in the North-West ward. At the time, councillors were elected for two-year terms. Anderson resigned in mid-April 1894 as he was about to leave for a trip to England. Anderson was succeeded in the North-West ward by Harry Beswick, who would a year later be elected mayor. Anderson returned from his trip in November 1894.

John Anderson, Sr. was an inaugural director of the New Zealand Shipping Company and when he died in April 1897, the directorship was transferred to Anderson Jr.

== Death ==
Anderson died on 26 May 1934 in Christchurch. He is buried at Addington Cemetery.
