= List of statues of Queen Victoria =

This is a list of statues of Queen Victoria of the United Kingdom, in locations worldwide.

== Africa ==
Image	Title / subject	Location and coordinates	Date	Artist / designer	Type	Material	Dimensions	Designation	Wikidata	Notes
More images	Queen Victoria	Port Louis, Mauritius	1897							
	Queen Victoria	Sultan Hussein Quay, Port Said, Egypt	1904							No longer exists, for reasons unknown
	Queen Victoria	Nairobi, Kenya	1906		Statue on pedestal					Destroyed by vandals February 2015.
	Queen Victoria	Cape Coast, Ghana	1925	Jacob Wilson Sey	Bust on pillar					

== Asia ==
Image	Title / subject	Location and coordinates	Date	Artist / designer	Type	Material	Dimensions	Designation	Wikidata	Notes
More images	Statue of Queen Victoria	Victoria Park, Hong Kong	1896	Mario Raggi	Seated statue on pedestal	Bronze and stone			Q47305137	
	Statue of Queen Victoria	National Museum of Colombo, Sri Lanka	1897	George Edward Wade	Seated statue on pedestal				Q124518278	
	Statue of Queen Victoria	British Embassy, Bangkok, Thailand	1903	Sir Alfred Gilbert	Seated on pedestal	Marble	4 m (14 ft) high; 9 m (30 ft) wide; 2 t (2 short tons)			
	Statue of Queen Victoria	Foreign Cemetery, Chiang Mai, Thailand	1903		Statue on pedestal	Bronze and stone			Q124250184	
	Queen Victoria	Prince of Wales Crescent, Tawahi, Aden, Yemen	1905	S. C. Tweed						
	Queen Victoria Memorial	George Town, Penang, Malaysia	1930							

== Australia ==
Image	Title / subject	Location and coordinates	Date	Artist / designer	Type	Material	Dimensions	Designation	Wikidata	Notes
More images	Queen Victoria	General Post Office, Sydney	1883	Giovanni Fontana	Sculpture group in niche					
More images	Queen Victoria	Queen's Square, Sydney	1888	Joseph Edgar Boehm	Statue on pedestal					
More images	Queen Victoria	Sturt Street Gardens, Ballarat	1897–1900	Bertram Mackennal	Statue on pedestal	Marble	330 cm (130 in) above pedestal	NTA Victoria		
More images	Queen Victoria	Victoria Square, Adelaide	1894	Charles Bell Birch	Statue on pedestal	Bronze and granite				
More images	Queen Victoria	Kings Park, Perth	1903	Francis John Williamson	Statue on pedestal					
	Queen Victoria	Rosalind Park. Pall Mall, Bendigo	1903	James White	Statue on pedestal with sculpture					
More images	Queen Victoria Monument	Eastern Park, Geelong, Victoria.	1903							
More images	Statue of Queen Victoria	Queen Victoria Building, Druitt Street, Sydney	1904 (in Dublin); 1987 (in Sydney)	John Hughes	Seated statue on pedestal	Bronze and stone			Q17480153	
More images	Queen Victoria	Queens Gardens, Brisbane	1906	Thomas Brock	Statue on pedestal	Bronze and stone				
More images	Queen Victoria	Queen Victoria Gardens, Melbourne	1907	James White	Statue on column with sculptures	Marble and granite	10m tall		Q56206369	

== Canada ==
Image	Title / subject	Location and coordinates	Date	Artist / designer	Type	Material	Dimensions	Designation	Wikidata	Notes
	Queen Victoria	Library of Parliament, Ottawa	1871	Marshall Wood	Statue on pedestal	Stone				
More images	Victoria Memorial	Victoria Square, Montreal	1872	Marshall Wood	Statue on pedestal	Bronze and granite			Q7926867	
	Queen Victoria	Parc Victoria, Quebec City	1897	Marshall Wood						Blown up by separatist radicals in 1963; head and body stored at Musée de la civilisation. Originally installed in Toronto 1871–74.
	Queen Victoria	Royal Victoria College, McGill University, Montreal	1899	Princess Louise, Duchess of Argyll	Seated statue on pedestal	Bronze and stone				
More images	Queen Victoria	Parliament Hill, Ottawa	1901	Louis-Philippe Hébert	Statue on pedestal with sculptures	Bronze and granite				
More images	Queen Victoria	Queen's Park, Toronto	1903	Mario Raggi	Seated statue on pedestal with reliefs	Bronze and stone				Commissioned 1870, unveiled 1903. Bronze reliefs by J.L. Banks.
More images	Statue of Queen Victoria	Manitoba Legislative Building	1904	George Frampton	Seated statue on pedestal	Bronze and granite			Q16903553	Beheaded and destroyed beyond repair on Canada Day, 1 July 2021 in a protest against the legacy of residential schools in the country. The head, crown, and the orb of the statue were removed by protesters overnight, with the head being recovered from the Assiniboine River without its crown.
More images	Queen Victoria	Gore Park, Hamilton, Ontario	1908	Louis-Philippe Hébert	Statue on pedestal with sculptures					
More images	Queen Victoria	Victoria Park, Kitchener, Ontario	1911	Cavaliere Raffaele Zaccaquini	Statue on pedestal with sculpture					
	Queen Victoria	River Glade, New Brunswick	1913	O. Andreini	Statue on pedestal with sculpture group	Stone				
More images	Statue of Queen Victoria	British Columbia Parliament Buildings, Victoria	1914, unveiled 1921	Albert Bruce Joy	Statue on pedestal	Bronze and stone			Q53754701	
	Statue of Queen Victoria	Birge-Carnegie Library, Toronto			Statue in niche					

== Caribbean ==
Image	Title / subject	Location and coordinates	Date	Artist / designer	Type	Material	Dimensions	Designation	Wikidata	Notes
	Queen Victoria Monument	High Court grounds, Georgetown, Guyana	1894	Henry Richard Hope-Pinker	Statue on pedestal	Marble and stone				
	Queen Victoria	Kingston, Jamaica	1897	Emanuel Edward Geflowski	Statue on pedestal	Marble and stone				
More images	Queen Victoria	Bahamian Parliament Building, Nassau, Bahamas	1905	John Adams-Acton	Statue on pedestal	Marble				
	Queen Victoria	Orange Walk Town, Belize			Bust					

== Europe (excepting United Kingdom) ==
Image	Title / subject	Location and coordinates	Date	Artist / designer	Type	Material	Dimensions	Designation	Wikidata	Notes
	Queen Victoria	University College Cork, Cork, Republic of Ireland	1849	Patrick J. Scannell	Statue	Limestone	0.75 tons			Commissioned by Sir Thomas Deane, Cork architect, who presented it to the new institution of Queen's College, Cork, as a gift in 1849.
More images	Queen Victoria	Victoria Park, Jersey	1887	Georges Wallet	Statue on pedestal	Bronze and stone				
More images	Statue of Queen Victoria	Republic Square, Malta	1891	Giuseppe Valenti	Seated statue on pedestal and steps	Marble and stone			Q96333358	
	Queen Victoria	Governor's Parade, Gibraltar	1910		Bust on pillar	Stone				
More images	Queen Victoria	Quartier Cimiez, Nice, France	1912	Louis Maubert	Sculpture group			Registered historic monument	Q3323418	
	Queen Victoria	Square Victoria, Menton, France	1960	Joseph Gazan	Sculpture group	white marble and bronze		Registered historic monument		

== India ==
Image	Title / subject	Location and coordinates	Date	Artist / designer	Type	Material	Dimensions	Designation	Wikidata	Notes
More images	Queen Victoria	Dr. Bhau Daji Lad Museum, Mumbai	1870	Matthew Noble	Bust	Marble				
More images	Queen Victoria	Dr. Bhau Daji Lad Museum, Mumbai	Unveiled 1872	Matthew Noble	Seated statue on pedestal with canopy	Marble	Originally 42 feet high with canopy			Originally unveiled in central Mumbai, moved into Museum 1965 after repeated attacks but without its canopy
	Queen Victoria	Indian Museum, Kolkata	1878	Marshall Wood	Statue on pedestal with plaque	Marble with bronze plaque				
	Queen Victoria	Southern side of the Madras University, Chepauk Park, Chennai	1887	Joseph Boehm	Seated statue on pedestal with canopy	Bronze				
	Queen Victoria	Gulab Bagh, Udaipur	1889	Charles Bell Birch	Statue on pedestal	Marble and granite				
	Queen Victoria	Jubilee Gardens, Watson Museum, Rajkot	1899	Alfred Gilbert	Seated statue	Marble with gilded bronze elements				
	Queen Victoria	Uttar Pradesh State Museum	c. 1899	George Frampton	Statue	Bronze				Originally erected at Victoria Park, Lucknow
More images	Queen Victoria	Grounds of the Victoria Memorial, Kolkata	1902	George Frampton	Seated statue on pedestal and steps	Bronze and stone			Q92360272	
	Queen Victoria	In front of the palace at Dhar	1902							Unveiled in November 1902
	Queen Victoria	College of Art, Delhi	1902	Alfred Turner	Statue	Bronze				Unveiled in Delhi on 26 December 1902 by Sir Charles Montgomery Rivaz, Lieutenant-Governor of the Punjab. Later moved to the college.
	Queen Victoria	Punjab Museum, Sheesh Mahal, Patiala	1903	Francis Derwent Wood	Statue	Bronze				Originally erected at the Baradari Palace with pedestal
	Queen Victoria	Uttar Pradesh State Museum	1903	Thomas Tarran	Sculpture group	Copper				Originally erected at Gorakhpur, relocated 1982
	Queen Victoria	Uttar Pradesh State Museum	1904	Thomas Brock	Statue	Bronze				Originally erected at Cawnpore
	Queen Victoria	Queen Victoria Pavilion, One Town, Visakhapatnam	1904		Statue	Bronze				
	Queen Victoria	Police Lines, Mathura	1905	Thomas Brock	Statue on pedestal with figures of Justice and Truth	Bronze and marble				Originally erected at Agra at the centre of an ornamental lake, relocated 1960s without supporting figures
	Queen Victoria	Regemental H.Q. Fatehgarh, Uttar Pradesh	1905	Francis John Williamson	Statue	Bronze				Formerly at Farrukhabad
	Queen Victoria Statue	Victoria Garden (now in Sanskar Kendra), Ahmedabad, India	1910	Ganpatrao Kashinath Mhatre	Statue on pedestal with stone canopy	Carrara marble, cold-blue Indian marble	7 feet			Statue moved to museum, pedestal canopy in garden
More images	Statue of Queen Victoria	Queen's Park, Bangalore	1906	Thomas Brock	Statue on pedestal	Marble and sandstone			Q22116770	
	Queen Victoria	Near cemetery, Nagpur, Maharashtra	1906	Herbert Hampton	Two identical statues	Marble				One statue was originally sited at the Victoria Technical Institute in Nagpur, the other at Jabbulpore, both relocated in 1960s
	Queen Victoria	Uttar Pradesh State Museum	1908	William Hamo Thornycroft	Two identical statues	Marble				One was originally erected at Lucknow with a canopy, the other at Ayodhya
More images	Queen Victoria	Victoria Memorial, Kolkata	1921	Thomas Brock	Statue on pedestal	Marble			Q92360284	
More images	Queen Victoria	Government Museum, Mathura			Seated statue	Bronze			Q96072002	

== New Zealand ==
Image	Title / subject	Location and coordinates	Date	Artist / designer	Type	Material	Dimensions	Designation	Wikidata	Notes
More images	Queen Victoria	Albert Park, Auckland	1899	Francis John Williamson	Statue on pedestal	Bronze and stone		Category II	Q79312016	
More images	Queen Victoria	Victoria Square, Christchurch	1903	Francis John Williamson	Statue on pedestal with plaques	Bronze and stone		Category II	Q75626451	
More images	Queen Victoria	Kent Terrace, Wellington	1905	Alfred Drury	Statue on pedestal	Bronze and stone		Category II	Q79312013	Copy of Drury's Portsmouth, England statue
More images	Queen Victoria	Queens Gardens, Dunedin	1905	Herbert Hampton	Statue on pedestal with sculptures	Marble, stone and bronze		Category II	Q79312017	

== South Africa ==
Image	Title / subject	Location and coordinates	Date	Artist / designer	Type	Material	Dimensions	Designation	Wikidata	Notes
	Queen Victoria	Langalibalele Street, Pietermaritzburg	1890	Joseph Edgar Boehm	Statue on pedestal	Marble and stone				
More images	Queen Victoria	Houses of Parliament, Cape Town	1890	Thomas Brock	Statue on pedestal	Granite pedestal			Q20614583	
	Queen Victoria	Sea Point, Cape Town	1897		Statue on tiered fountain	Cast iron				
	Queen Victoria	Maclean Square, King William's Town	1899							
More images	Queen Victoria	Francis Farewell Square, Durban	1899	Hamo Thornycroft	Statue on pedestal	Marble and stone			Q115106431	
More images	Queen Victoria	Market Square, Port Elizabeth	1903	Edwin Roscoe Mullins	Statue on pedestal	Marble			Q36692437	
	Queen Victoria	Kimberley, Northern Cape	1906							

== United Kingdom ==
=== Scotland ===
Image	Title / subject	Location and coordinates	Date	Artist / designer	Type	Material	Dimensions	Designation	Wikidata	Notes
More images	Queen Victoria	Royal Scottish Academy Building, Princes Street, Edinburgh	1844	Sir John Steell	Seated statue	Stone		Category A	Q7374813	
More images	Queen Victoria	George Square, Glasgow	1854	Carlo Marochetti	Equestrian statue on pedestal	Bronze and granite		Category A	Q17567473	First equestrian statue of a woman in Britain.
	Queen Victoria	Aberdeen Town House, Aberdeen	1866	Alexander Brodie	Statue on pedestal	Marble				Statue was originally on the corner of St. Nicholas and Union Streets
	Queen Victoria	Balmoral Estate, Aberdeenshire	1887	Joseph Edgar Boehm	Statue on pedestal	Bronze and granite		Category A	Q17574625	
More images	Doulton Fountain	Glasgow Green, Glasgow	1888	A.E Pearce of the Royal Doulton Company and others	Statue on tiered fountain with sculptures	Terracotta		Category A	Q17568982	
More images	Queen Victoria	Queen's Cross, Aberdeen	1893	Charles Bell Birch	Statue on pedestal	Bronze and granite		Category B	Q17770185	
More images	Queen Victoria	Albert Square, Dundee	1899	Harry Bates	Seated statue on pedestal with panels	Bronze and granite		Category B	Q17798977	
More images	Queen Victoria	Dunn Square, Paisley, Renfrewshire	1901	Francis John Williamson	Statue on pedestal	Bronze and granite		Category B	Q17841622	
More images	Queen Victoria	Foot of Leith Walk, Leith	1907	John Stevenson Rhind	Statue on pedestal with plaques	Bronze and sandstone		Category B	Q17811847	
	Queen Victoria	Jubilee Building, Glasgow Royal Infirmary, Glasgow	1914	Albert Hodge	Seated statue	Bronze				

=== North East England ===
Image	Title / subject	Location and coordinates	Date	Artist / designer	Type	Material	Dimensions	Designation	Wikidata	Notes
More images	Queen Victoria	Front Street, Tynemouth	1902	Alfred Turner	Seated statue on pedestal	Bronze and Portland stone		Grade II	Q26276238	
More images	Queen Victoria	St Nicholas Square, Newcastle upon Tyne	Unveiled 1903	Alfred Gilbert	Seated statue on pedestal	Bronze and granite		Grade II*	Q17552291	
More images	Queen Victoria	Grounds of Royal Victoria Infirmary, Newcastle upon Tyne	1906	George Frampton	Statue on pedestal	Marble and stone		Grade II*	Q17552314	
More images	Queen Victoria	South Shields	1913	Albert Toft	Statue on pedestal		7m tall	Grade II	Q26525766	

=== North West England ===
Image	Title / subject	Location and coordinates	Date	Artist / designer	Type	Material	Dimensions	Designation	Wikidata	Notes
More images	Queen Victoria	Peel Park, Salford	1857	Matthew Noble	Statue on pedestal	Limestone		Grade II	Q26665923	
More images	Queen Victoria	St George's Hall, Liverpool	1869	Thomas Thornycroft	Equestrian statue on pedestal	Bronze and stone		Grade II	Q26643648	
	Queen Victoria and Prince Albert	The Storey, Lancaster	1887–1890	Percy Guy Wood	Statuary group	Limestone and marble		—N/a		
More images	Queen Victoria	Piccadilly Gardens, Manchester	1901	Edward Onslow Ford	Seated statue on pedestal	Bronze and Portland stone		Grade II	Q26539302	
More images	Queen Victoria	Bitts Park, Carlisle	1902	Thomas Brock	Statue on pedestal & steps	Bronze and granite		Grade II	Q26513391	
More images	Statue of Queen Victoria	Victoria Square, St Helens, Merseyside	1902	George Frampton	Seated statue on pedestal	Bronze on sandstone and granite	6.4m	Grade II*	Q15979535	
More images	Statue of Queen Victoria	Forecourt of Chester Castle, Cheshire	1903	F. W. Pomeroy	Statue on pedestal	Bronze and stone		Grade II	Q15615686	
More images	Queen Victoria	Neville Street, Southport	1903	George Frampton	Statue on pedestal	Bronze and stone		Grade II	Q26659949	
More images	Queen Victoria	Blackburn Cathedral, Blackburn	1905	Bertram Mackennal	Statue on pedestal	Stone		Grade II	Q26532163	
More images	Queen Victoria Monument	Derby Square, Liverpool	1906	C. J. Allen	26 statues with canopy, pedestal, stepped base	Bronze and stone		Grade II	Q7926878	
More images	Queen Victoria Memorial	Dalton Square, Lancaster	1906	Herbert Hampton	Statue on pedestal with plaques	Bronze and Portland stone		Grade II*	Q17531646	

=== Yorkshire and the Humber ===
Image	Title / subject	Location and coordinates	Date	Artist / designer	Type	Material	Dimensions	Designation	Wikidata	Notes
More images	Queen Victoria	Pearson Park, Kingston upon Hull	1863	Thomas Earle	Seated statue on pedestal	Marble		Grade II	Q26579906	
More images	Queen Victoria	Station Parade, Harrogate	1887	H.E. Brown	Statue on pedestal under canopy	Stone		Grade II	Q26602187	
More images	Memorial to Queen Victoria	Woodhouse Moor, Leeds	1903	George Frampton	Statue and frieze on column	Bronze and Portland stone		Grade II*	Q15979175	
More images	Queen Victoria	Queen Victoria Square, Kingston upon Hull	1903	Henry Charles Fehr	Statue on pedestal with surround	Bronze and Portland stone		Grade II	Q26492135	
More images	Queen Victoria	Princes Way, Bradford	1904	Alfred Drury	Statue on pedestal	Bronze and stone		Grade II	Q26425844	
More images	Queen Victoria	Endcliffe Park, Sheffield	1904	Alfred Turner	Statue on pedestal	Bronze and Portland stone		Grade II	Q26546446	
More images	Queen Victoria	Castrop-Rauxel Square, Wakefield	1905	Francis John Williamson	Statue on pedestal	Bronze and granite		Grade II	Q26550928	
More images	Queen Victoria	West Bank Park, York	1905	George Walker Milburn	Seated statue on pedestal	Marble and sandstone		Grade II	Q26547763	
More images	Queen Victoria	Borough Gardens, Scarborough		Charles Bell Birch	Statue on pedestal	Bronze and granite		Grade II	Q26535858	

=== East & West Midlands ===
Image	Title / subject	Location and coordinates	Date	Artist / designer	Type	Material	Dimensions	Designation	Wikidata	Notes
More images	Queen Victoria	Shire Hall, Worcester	1887	Thomas Brock	Statue on pedestal	Marble and granite		Grade II	Q26669257	
More images	Queen Victoria	The Parade, Royal Leamington Spa	1901	Albert Toft	Statue on pedestal	Marble and granite	7m high	Grade II	Q26661547	
More images	Queen Victoria	Victoria Square, Birmingham	1901, recast 1951	Thomas Brock	Statue on pedestal	Bronze and stone			Q47460184	Recast by William Bloye from Brock's original marble statue in 1951
More images	Queen Victoria	Queen's Gardens, Newcastle Under Lyme	1903	Charles Bell Birch	Statue on pedestal	Bronze and granite		Grade II	Q26491275	
More images	Queen Victoria	Memorial Gardens, Nottingham	1905	Albert Toft	Statue on pedestal with plaques	Marble, granite and bronze		Grade II	Q26560473	
More images	Queen Victoria	Derbyshire Royal Infirmary, Derby	1906	Charles Bell Birch	Statue on pedestal	Bronze and granite		Grade II	Q26575629	

=== East Anglia and South East England ===
Image	Title / subject	Location and coordinates	Date	Artist / designer	Type	Material	Dimensions	Designation	Wikidata	Notes
More images	Queen's Monument	High Street, Maidstone	1862	John Thomas	Statue on pedestal with canopy	Stone and granite		Grade II	Q26376681	
	Queen Victoria and Albert, Prince Consort	Frogmore Mausoleum, Windsor, Berkshire	1867	William Theed	Statue group	Marble				
	Queen Victoria	Canterbury Cathedral, Kent	c. 1868	Theodore Phyffers	Statue in niche	Stone				
	Queen Victoria	Grand Vestibule, Windsor Castle	1871	Joseph Edgar Boehm	Seated statue on pedestal	Marble				
	Queen Victoria	Abingdon Abbey, Oxfordshire	1887		Statue on pedestal	Bronze and stone		Grade II	Q26300244	
More images	Queen Victoria	Royal Holloway University, Egham	1887	Count Victor Gleichen	Statue on pedestal	Stone		Grade II	Q26484518	
More images	Queen Victoria	Frair Street, Reading, Berkshire	1887	George Blackall Simonds	Statue on pedestal	Marble and granite		Grade II	Q20651362	
More images	Queen Victoria	Castle Hill, Windsor, Berkshire	1887	Joseph Edgar Boehm	Statue on pedestal with reliefs	Bronze and granite		Grade II	Q26570416	
More images	Queen Victoria	Winchester Great Hall, Winchester	1887	Alfred Gilbert	Seated statue on pedestal	Bronze		Grade I		
More images	Queen Victoria	Memorial Garden, Market Hill, Woodbridge, Suffolk	1888	J. Wormleighton	Statue on pedestal	Portland stone				
	Queen Victoria	Victoria Barracks, Windsor	1891-6	William Hamo Thornycroft	Statue	Marble				Relocated from the Royal Exchange, London in 1996.
More images	Statue of Queen Victoria, Brighton	Victoria Gardens, Brighton	1897	Carlo Nicoli	Statue on pedestal	Marble and stone		Grade II	Q26660859	
	Queen Victoria	Darnley Road, Gravesend	1897–98	J. Broad & Doultons, Lambeth	Statue on pedestal	Various including terracotta		Grade II		
More images	Queen Victoria	Borough Market House, Gravesend	1898	J. Broad	Statue on pedestal	Stone		Grade II		
More images	Queen Victoria	Cliff Town Parade, Southend-on-Sea	1898	Joseph William Swynnerton	Seated statue on pedestal	Stone		Grade II	Q26406629	
More images	Statue of Queen Victoria, Hove	Grand Avenue, Hove	Unveiled 1901	Thomas Brock	Statue on pedestal	Bronze and marble		Grade II	Q26482744	
More images	Queen Victoria	Warrior Square Gardens, St Leonards-on-Sea	1902	Francis John Williamson	Statue on pedestal	Bronze and granite		Grade II	Q26486896	
	Queen Victoria	Colchester Town Hall	1902	L.J Watts	Statue					
More images	Queen Victoria	Victoria Park, Newbury, Berkshire	1902-3		Statue on pedestal					
More images	Queen Victoria	Guildhall Square, Portsmouth	1903	Alfred Drury	Statue on pedestal	Bronze and granite		Grade II	Q26398294	
	Queen Victoria	Christchurch Mansion, Ipswich	1904		Statue					Melted down for munitions in 1943
	Queen Victoria	Royal Military Academy Sandhurst, Berkshire	1904	Henry Price	Statue on pedestal	Bronze and granite		Grade II		Relocated from Woolwich Arsenal in 1947
More images	Queen Victoria	Marine Parade, Harwich	1905		Statue on pedestal	Marble and granite		Grade II	Q26483097	

=== London ===
Image	Title / subject	Location and coordinates	Date	Artist / designer	Type	Material	Dimensions	Designation	Wikidata	Notes
	Queen Victoria	St Thomas' Hospital, Lambeth	1873	Matthew Noble	Seated statue on pedestal	Marble and stone			Q93424107	
More images	Queen Victoria	Temple Bar Memorial, The Strand	1879-80	Joseph Edgar Boehm	Statue in niche	Stone		Grade II		
More images	Queen Victoria	Kensington Gardens	c. 1887	Princess Louise, Duchess of Argyll	Seated statue on pedestal	Marble and Portland stone		Grade II	Q27080880	
More images	Queen Victoria	Imperial College, London	1888	Joseph Boehm	Statue	Marble				
More images	Queen Victoria	New Bridge Street, Blackfriars Bridge	1893, 1896	Charles Bell Birch	Statue on pedestal	Bronze and granite		Grade II	Q23034696	
More images	Queen Victoria	Carlton House Terrace, London	Unveiled 1902	Thomas Brock	Statue	Marble			Q19927909	
More images	Queen Victoria	Croydon Town Hall, Katherine Street	1903	Francis John Williamson	Seated statue	Bronze		Grade II	Q27861714	
More images	Queen Victoria	Interior of Woolwich Town Hall, London	1905	F.W. Pomeroy	Statue on pedestal	Marble				
	Queen Victoria, St George and St Michael	Facade of the Victoria and Albert Museum	1906	Alfred Drury	Statues in niches	Stone				
More images	Victoria Memorial, London	The Mall, London	Unveiled 1911, completed 1924	Thomas Brock	Sculpture on pillar with statues and fountains	Marble, bronze, Portland stone		Grade I	Q1333411	
More images	Queen Victoria as Peace	Friary Park, Friern Barnet	Cast 1862, erected 1911	Joseph Durham	Statue on mound	Bronze and granite	3.3m (statue)	Grade II	Q27084123	
	Victoria, aged 20	Victoria Square, Westminster	2008	Catherine Anne Laugel	Statue	Bronze				

=== South West England ===
Image	Title / subject	Location and coordinates	Date	Artist / designer	Type	Material	Dimensions	Designation	Wikidata	Notes
	Queen Victoria	Little Queen Street, Exeter	1848		Rooftop statue					
	Queen Victoria and Albert, Prince Consort	Tower of the former Assize Court, Small Street, Bristol	1867-1870		Two statues	Stone		Grade II*		Architects TS Pope & J Bindon.
More images	Statue of Queen Victoria	College Green, Bristol	1888	Joseph Edgar Boehm	Statue on pedestal with panels	Marble, granite and bronze		Grade II	Q7270543	
More images	Queen Victoria	Victoria Art Gallery, Bath	c. 1897	Andrea Carlo Lucchesi	Statue in niche	Stone		Grade II*		
More images	Statue of Queen Victoria	Outside St John's Church, The Esplanade, Weymouth	1902	George Blackall Simonds	Statue on pedestal	Bronze and Portland stone	7m tall	Grade II	Q26562015	
	Queen Victoria	Gardens of Athelhampton House, Dorset								
		Barnstaple, Devon								

=== Wales ===
Image	Title / subject	Location and coordinates	Date	Artist / designer	Type	Material	Dimensions	Designation	Wikidata	Notes
	Queen Victoria	Happy Valley, Great Orme, Llandudno	1887		Statue with fountain and canopy	Stone		Grade II	Q29485153	
More images	Queen Victoria	Bellevue Park, Wrexham	1904	Henry Price	Sculpture on pedestal	Bronze and stone		Grade II	Q29482042	

=== Northern Ireland ===
Image	Title / subject	Location and coordinates	Date	Artist / designer	Type	Material	Dimensions	Designation	Wikidata	Notes
	Queen Victoria	Guildhall, Derry	1898	Francis John Williamson	Statue	Marble				
More images	Queen Victoria	Belfast City Hall	1903	Thomas Brock	Statue on pedestal and steps with sculptures	Marble, Portland stone, bronze		Grade A		
	Queen Victoria	Royal Victoria Hospital, Belfast	1903	John Wenlock Rollins	Statue (seated)	Bronze				

== See also ==
- Royal monuments in Canada
