= Shermuhammadpuram =

- Village
- Interactive map of Shermuhammadpuram
- Location in Andhra Pradesh, India Shermuhammadpuram (India)
- Coordinates: 18°17′59″N 83°49′59″E
- Country: India
- State: Andhra Pradesh

Languages
  - Official: Telugu
- Time zone: UTC+5:30 (IST)

Shermuhammadpuram is a village located in Etcherla mandal in Srikakulam district, northeastern Andhra Pradesh, India. It is located 7 miles (11 km) east of Chipurupalle, and 4 miles (6.4 km) west of Srikakulam (Chicacole). It contains the ruins of a palace built by a Mussulman governor who gave his name to the place. A 1922 publication stated that "there was a general failure of crops in Madugula and of wet crops in Shermuhammadpuram".

== History ==
Before 1947, Shermuhammadpuram was an erstwhile Zamindari of the British Raj located in Madras Presidency. The zamindari was prosperous and was second only to the Vizianagaram estate in paying a high amount of peshkush to the British government. The Rajas of Shermuhammadpuram were known and respected for their genius.

Evidently, Raja Jugga Rao was an agent and interpreter of John Andrews, the chief of Machilipatnam, and moved with him to Visakhapatnam in 1769. His son and successor, Raja Surya Narayan Rao was well known in the region for his intelligence and public spirit. However, the most famous member of this aristocrat family was Raja Gode Venkat Jugga Rao. He was one of the earliest pioneers of observational astronomy in India and laid establishment of the earliest private modern astronomical observatory of India at Daba Gardens, Visakhapatnam in 1840 named after him as G.V. Juggarow Observatory. Furthermore, he had the privilege of traveling to England in 1900 and interacting with Queen Victoria and Edward VII, Prince of Wales. He was elected as the Fellow of the Royal Astronomical Society, Royal Meteorological Society, Royal Colonial Institute and Royal Society of Arts. On his way back to India, he received a bronze statue of Queen Victoria which is now situated in the Queen Victoria Pavilion in One Town (Visakhapatnam).
