= Government Victoria Hospital =

Coordinates: 17.698826°N 83.298162°E

- Government of Andhra Pradesh

Geography
- Location: Chengal Rao Peta, Visakhapatnam, India

Organisation
- Affiliated university: N.T.R. Health University

Services
- Emergency department: yes
- Beds: 200

Helipads
- Helipad: No

History
- Founded: 1894

The Government Victoria General Hospital, generally called Gosha Hospital, is the first women and children's hospital in the Visakhapatnam city which has served more than a century. It is located at Chengal Rao Peta, Visakhapatnam.

== History ==
King Goday Narayana Gajapathi Rao bought land for this hospital in 1894. In the early days, this hospital was run by Hilda Mary Lazarus with permission from Queen Victoria to establish the hospital. The hospital's name was changed to Victoria Hospital in 1949. This hospital came under the government of Madras.

== Services ==
This hospital serves women and children. The current capacity of this hospital is 200 beds and the Government of Andhra Pradesh expanding it with 100 more beds.
