= Statue of Queen Victoria (Victoria, British Columbia) =

Statue in Victoria, British Columbia

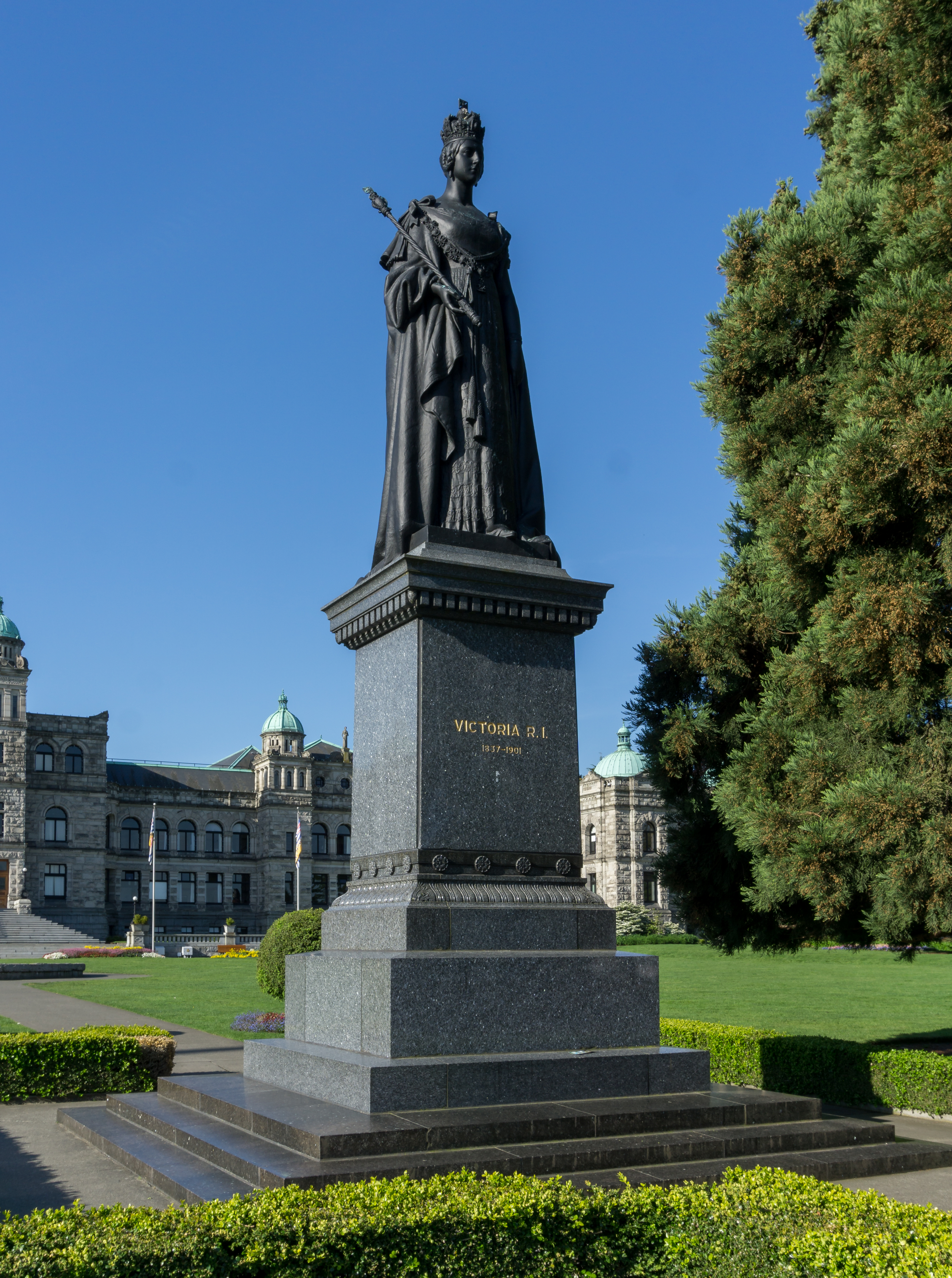
- The statue in 2018
- Artist: Albert Bruce-Joy
- Year: 1921
- Location: Victoria, British Columbia, Canada; 48°25′14″N 123°22′12″W

The statue of Queen Victoria is a bronze sculpture depicting Queen Victoria by British artist Albert Bruce-Joy, installed outside the British Columbia Parliament Buildings, in Victoria, British Columbia. The 4-metre (13 ft) statue was commissioned by Richard McBride in 1912, and completed in 1914. The statue's pedestal is made of blue marble, and its granite foundation stone was laid by Edward, Prince of Wales on September 24, 1919. World War I delayed the sculpture's unveiling until 1921.

In June 2021, the statue was vandalized to protest old-growth logging in British Columbia.

== See also ==
- Cultural depictions of Queen Victoria
- List of statues of Queen Victoria
