= Hilda Mary Lazarus =

Indian physician

Hilda Mary Lazarus CBE, MStJ, MRCS, FRCSE (23 January 1890 - died 1978) was a Christian missionary and popular gynecologist and obstetrician in India. She was Principal of Andhra Medical College and Superintendent of King George Hospital at Visakhapatnam. She was also the first Indian director of Christian Medical College and Hospital at Vellore.

== Early life ==
Hilda was born on 23 January 1890 in Visakhapatnam in southern India. Her grandparents converted to Christianity in the early 19th century, abandoning their Brahmin identity. She was one of nine surviving children born to Eliza and Daniel Lazarus. Her father was a highly regarded Christian educator and author. She joined CBM high school for her primary education.

== Medical training ==
At the Madras University Lazarus completed a B.A. before obtaining her medical degree from the Madras Medical College and winning a gold medal for outstanding work in Midwifery. She later went to England to qualify for a medical degree and spent many years for several courses in medicine. In the United Kingdom, she passed medical examinations in London and Dublin. She obtained membership in the Royal College of Surgeons and a specialization in obstetrics and gynecology. She was appointed to the Women's Medical Service (WMS) in India, the first Indian woman to obtain such an appointment. She was in government medical service from 1917 to 1947.

== Return to India ==
Lazarus entered her career with the WMS by serving briefly at Lady Hardinge Medical College and Hospital, New Delhi. Established under government auspices in 1916 as the only fully professional medical college in India concerned exclusively with the training of women, Lady Hardinge was open to qualified students from all religious backgrounds. Lady Hardinge Medical College was thus unique within India, and it was to this institution that Lazarus returned in triumph in 1940 as its first Indian principal.

During the years that intervened, she worked in various parts of India, superintending hospitals, training nurses and midwives, and taking other steps to improve the quality of medical services for women and children. In addition to broadening her professional horizons and areas of expertise, these years also led her to acquire facility in several new Indian languages in addition to the Telugu and Sanskrit that she had learned in childhood, along with English.

She wrote a book based on her experiences in England and served as the Director of Vellore Medical College between 1948 and 1954 and Chief Medical Officer at the Vellore hospital. She served for some time in the Government General Hospital, Madras. In Visakhapatnam, she served as Principal of Andhra Medical College and Superintendent of King George's Hospital. There is a Lazarus ward in the Government Victoria Hospital for Women and Child, where she also served.

== Awards ==
Lazarus was appointed a Serving Sister (Member) of the Venerable Order of St. John by King George VI in January 1941, and was awarded the Kaisar-i-Hind Gold Medal in the British government's 1942 Birthday Honours list. She was further appointed a Commander of the Order of the British Empire, Civil Division (CBE) in the 1946 Birthday Honours list. In 1961, the Government of India honored her with the Padma Shri award for her services.
