= St Aloysius' Anglo-Indian High School =

Location
- One Town, Visakhapatnam, Andhra Pradesh; India
- Coordinates: 17°41′34″N 83°17′36″E

Information
- Type: Mission School
- Religious affiliation: Roman Catholic
- Established: 1847; 179 years ago
- Founder: British Indian Army
- Grades: LKG - 10
- Affiliation: ICSE
- Website: Official Website

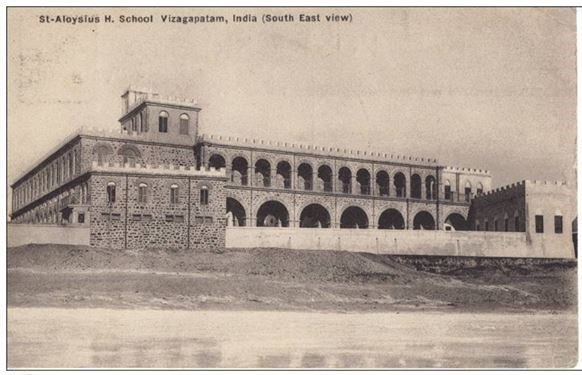
St. Aloysius H. School in 1920.

St Aloysius' Anglo-Indian High School is a Christian mission school in the city of Visakhapatnam, Andhra Pradesh, India. It was founded in the year 1847, during the East India Company rule in India by the British Indian Army. The school was started for the purpose of educating British Indian Army European soldiers' children. Nobel Laureate C. V. Raman was a student of the school.

== About ==
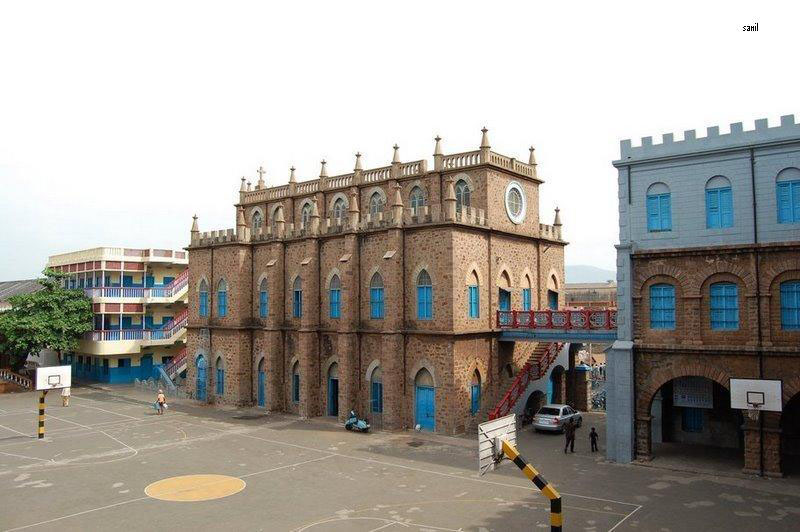
High School Building

St. Aloysius' was the first English medium school in Andhra Pradesh. During the Colonial period, it was the only English-medium education school between Chennai and Kolkata.
