= Statue of Queen Victoria, Teldeniya =

Marble statue in Sri Lanka

Queen Victoria Statue
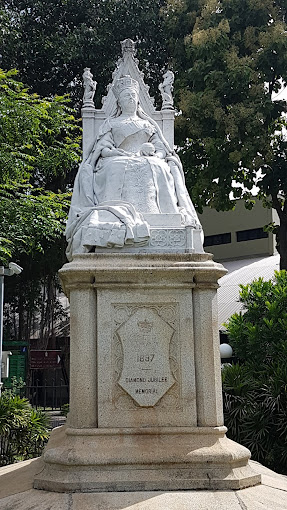
- The Queen Victoria Statue in Colombo
- Location: Queen Victoria Dam, Sri Lanka
- Designer: George Edward Wade
- Material: Carrara Marble (statue); Granite (base)
- Height: 180 cm (71 in) (statue); 450 cm (180 in) (including pedestal)
- Opening date: 1901

A statue of Queen Victoria was originally erected in front of the Passenger Jetty of Colombo Harbor and at the junction of York and Church Streets in 1897. The first monument to Queen Victoria in Ceylon, the marble statue was commissioned and unveiled in celebration of the Queen's Diamond Jubilee. The statue was commissioned to British portrait sculptor George Edward Wade. It was one of the only statues of Queen Victoria to be sculpted by him.

The statue was at its original location until mid-1920s and then it was moved to Gordon Gardens adjacent to the Queen's House. The statue moved from Gordon Gardens to Victoria Park and then to the Colombo Museum site in 2006. The statue was given a facelift ahead of the Commonwealth heads of government meeting in 2013 and was reinstalled facing Green Path.

The statue was removed and reinstalled at Queen Victoria Dam as part of the plan to make the surrounding area of the dam a tourist attraction.

== History ==
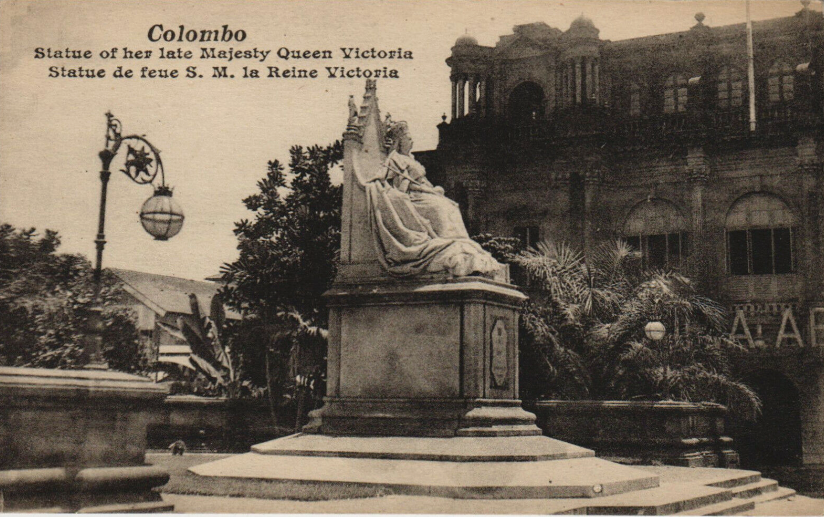
The statue of Queen-Empress Victoria at its first original location

If anything were to compensate a people for the loss of their national independence, it is to be governed by such a sovereign as Queen Victoria. Every one of us now and in the future may look upon her face and say that this has been the greatest and best Queen that we have ever known.

- Tamil Representative P. Coomaraswamy, addressing the Legislative Council, 1897.}}

The Diamond Jubilee of Queen Victoria was celebrated in 1897 and many celebrations were held all over the colonies of the British Empire. The Ceylon Legislative Council, which met on June 22, 1897, passed a resolution stating that a statue of the Queen be erected on the island at the cost of the public revenue, and as a commemoration of the 60th anniversary of Her Majesty's accession to the throne. This resolution was proposed by the Governor of British Ceylon and seconded by P. Coomaraswamy, the Tamil representative and it was taken as carried unanimously. {{rquote|right|It will be an effigy that at which the Colony will have reason to be proud| The Rt. Hon. Sir Joseph West Ridgeway, Governor of Ceylon, addressing the Legislative Council, 1901. It took a few years to complete the statue. The state of the statue was once questioned at the Legislative Council in October 1901. That revealed the progress of the work and the acting Colonial Secretary, who was in London a few months ago, said that he inspected the model. The marble block, which was imported to London from Italy, was on its way to London at that point. The artist was the famous London-based sculptor, George Edward Wade.

The statue finally arrived in Colombo in mid-1902, after the death of the Queen. It was ceremonially unveiled on June 25, 1902, by Lieutenant Governor Everard F. im Thurn. A large number of state and military officials, religious sector representatives, MC members, and local elites participated.

A news report of the day provided a good description of the statue:

"it was made out of Carrara marble, imported from Italy. This marble is a type of white or blue-grey marble used for sculpture and building decoration from the ancient times. The statue of the queen was in coronation robes. It was mounted on a square pedestal of grey granite with an octagonal base. The total height was 21 feet and the weight was 13 tons."

== See also ==
- List of statues of Queen Victoria
