= Victoria Memorial (Montreal) =

Statue of Queen Victoria in Montreal, Canada

Monument to Queen Victoria
- Monument à la reine Victoria
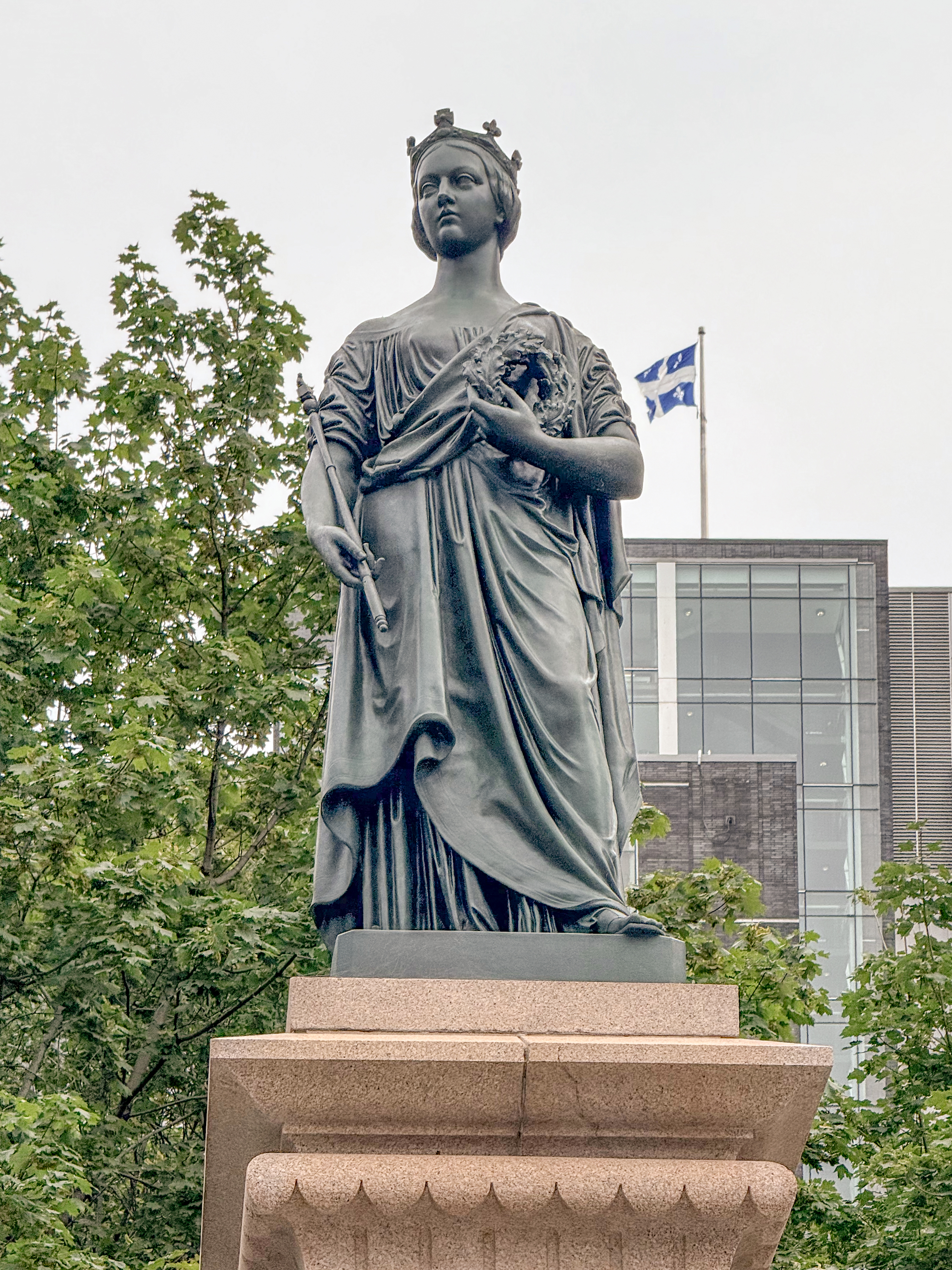
- Victoria Memorial in 2025
- Interactive map of Monument to Queen Victoria
- Location: Victoria Square, Montreal, Quebec, Canada
- Coordinates: 45°30′05″N 73°33′42″W
- Designer: Marshall Wood (sculptor)
- Type: Monument
- Material: Bronze and granite
- Beginning date: 1869
- Opening date: November 21, 1872
- Dedicated to: Victoria of the United Kingdom

The Victoria Memorial (French: Monument à la reine Victoria) is a sculpture placed at the centre of Victoria Square in Montreal, Quebec, Canada. It is one of the two monuments to the queen in the city.

== History ==
The statue of Queen Victoria in the centre of Victoria Square is the work of English sculptor Marshall Wood, and was unveiled on November 21, 1872 by Lord Dufferin, the Governor General of Canada. At the time, the area surrounding Victoria Square was a prestigious neighbourhood.

The commission for the statue coincided with the military posting of Prince Arthur in Montreal from 1869 to 1870 and was funded by donations from a citizens' committee, by public subscription, on the occasion of Prince Arthur’s visit. The bronze was cast by Holbrook & Company, Chelsea, England in 1869 Coming just a few years after the Canadian Confederation of 1867, the statue was intended to reinforce the connection between the newly-formed nation of Canada and the British monarchy. At the unveiling ceremony, the Governor General of Canada, Lord Dufferin, explicitly noted Queen Victoria's role in the confederation.

Following the queen's death in 1901, the monument became a focal point for public mourning in the city. Within days, a pile of wreaths and floral tributes five feet high had accumulated at its base. For several years afterward, McGill University students would hold an annual procession to the square on the anniversary of her death to lay wreaths.

== Description ==
The statue depicts a young, slender Queen Victoria, corresponding to the time of her accession to the throne. She is presented in classical robes, holding the traditional royal symbols of an orb and scepter. The monument was designed to present the queen with both a "sweet womanly grace and imperial majesty of aspect."

== Protests ==
The monument's location in Montreal's financial district has made it a site for political demonstrations. In October 2011, the Occupy Montreal protest established its encampment in Square Victoria, using the statue as a central gathering point. Protesters directly interacted with the monument, adorning it with a Guy Fawkes mask, a flag of the Quebec Patriotes, and a banner renaming the space "Place du Peuple" (People's Square). These actions were seen as a protest against the constitutional monarchy established in Canada by Queen Victoria, as well as a broader statement against capitalism and authoritarianism.

Montreal has a second monument to the queen, a sculpture by her daughter, Princess Louise, Duchess of Argyll, located on the campus of McGill University. This statue has also been a frequent site of protests, particularly by anti-colonial activist groups.

== Gallery ==
The Victoria Memorial in Victoria Square, 1903

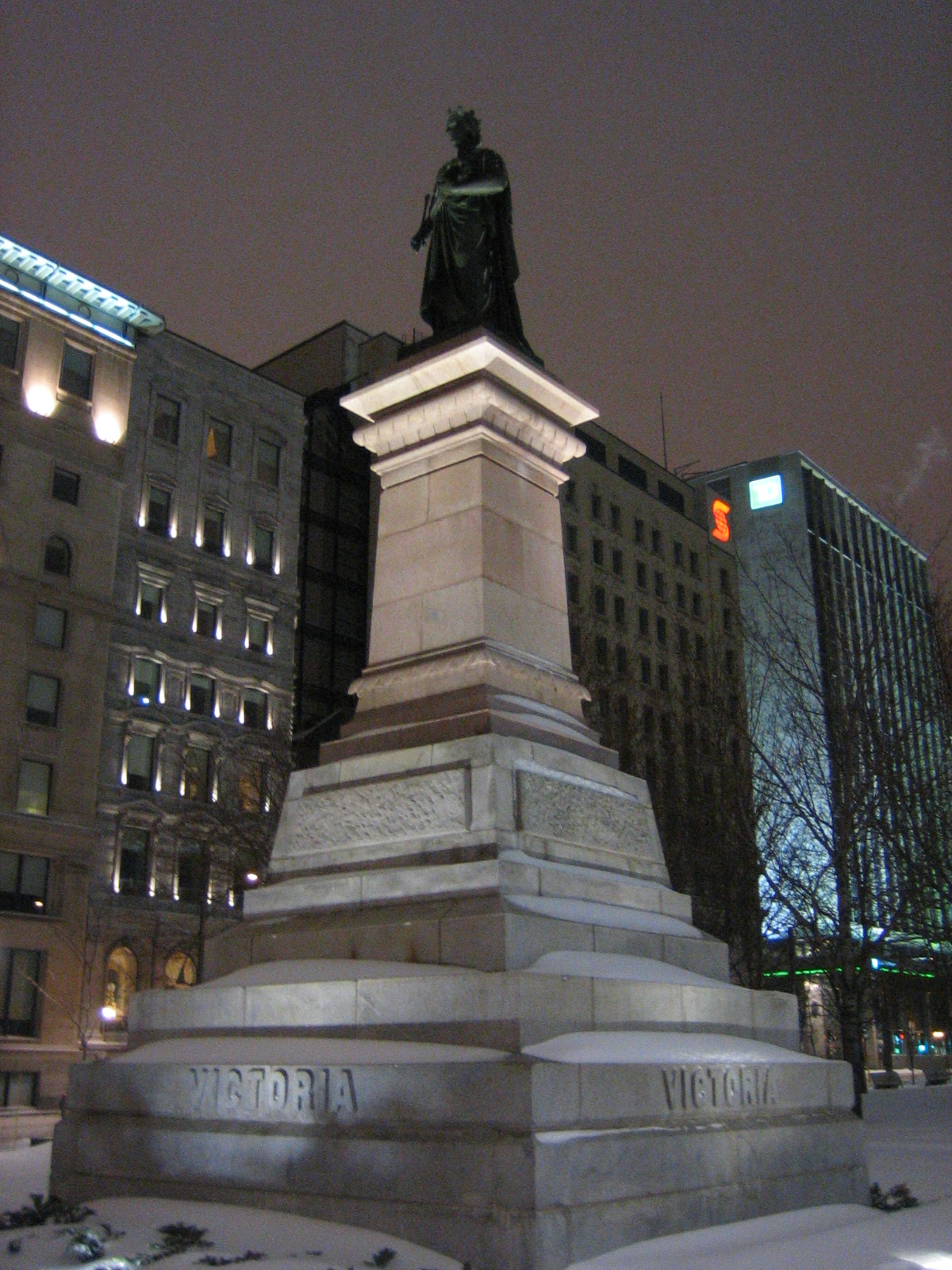

== See also ==
- List of statues of Queen Victoria

== Sources ==
- Hadley, Louisa (April 30, 2024). "The Three Phases of a Statue: Queen Victoria and the Monumental Past". In Danahay, Martin A.; Howey, Ann F. (eds.). Neo-Victorianism and Medievalism: Re-appropriating the Victorian and Medieval Pasts. BRILL. pp. 112–135. doi:10.1163/9789004688353_006. ISBN 978-90-04-68835-3.
