= Chengal Rao Peta =

- Neighbourhood
- Location in Visakhapatnam
- Coordinates: 17.697766°N 83.296371°E
- Country: India
- State: Andhra Pradesh
- District: Visakhapatnam

Government
  - Body: Greater Visakhapatnam Municipal Corporation

Languages
  - Official: Telugu
- Time zone: UTC+5:30 (IST)
- PIN: 530001
- Vehicle registration: AP-31

Chengal Rao Peta is one of the oldest settlements in the city of Visakhapatnam in the Indian state of Andhra Pradesh.The area, which falls under the local administrative limits of Greater Visakhapatnam Municipal Corporation, is about 4 km from the Dwaraka bus station.

== About ==
Chengal Rao Peta is one of the oldest settlements in Visakhapatnam city. It is the main residential hub of the city. There are many old monuments like Old Municipal Office, Town Hall Visakhapatnam, Reading Room and Government Victoria Hospital.
