= John Street (Hamilton, Ontario) =

Street in Hamilton, Ontario, Canada

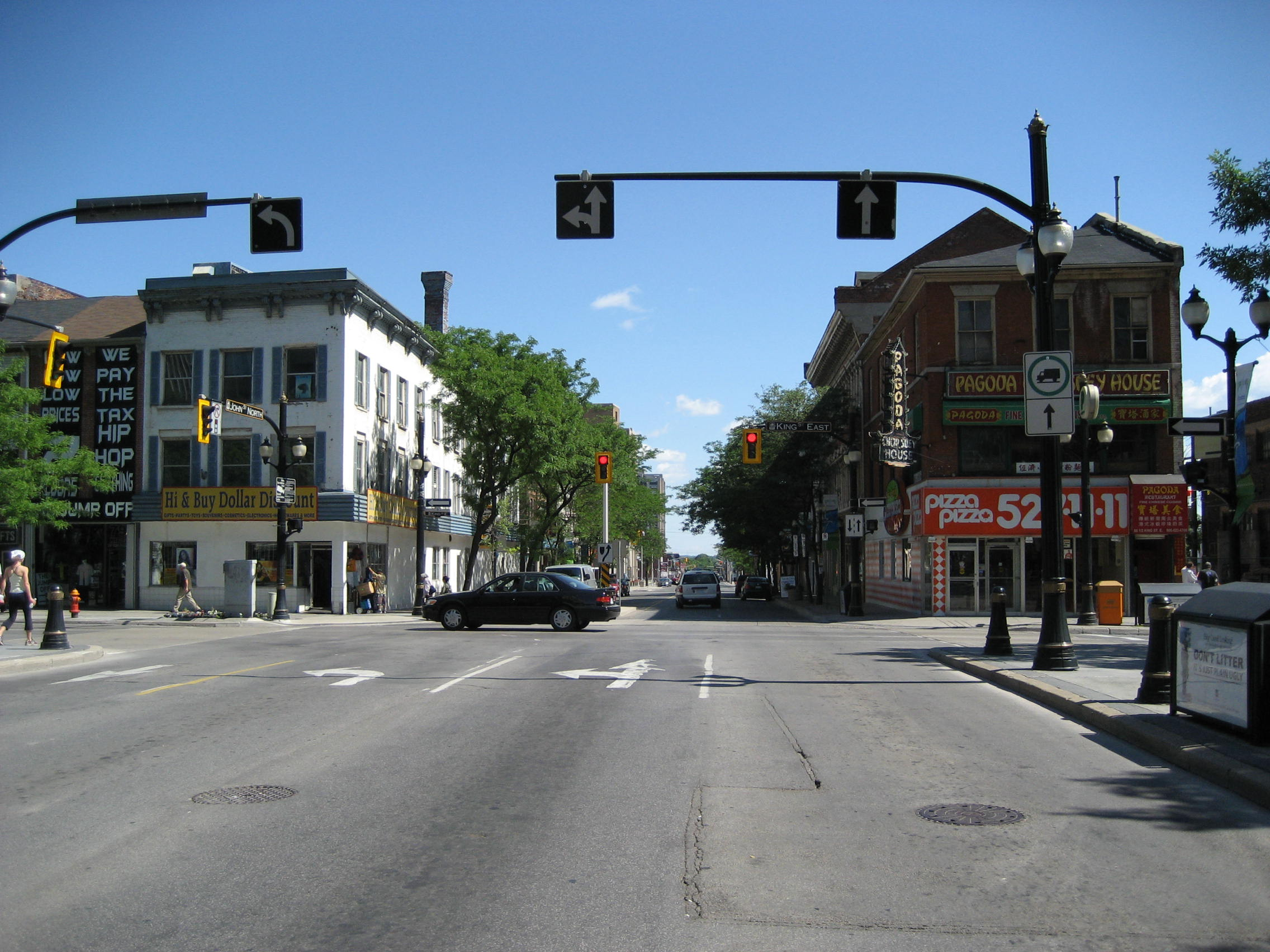
John Street at King, looking North

John Street is a Lower City arterial road in Hamilton, Ontario, Canada. Originally it was known as Mountain Road or Ancaster Road. It starts off at the base of Arkledun Avenue, a Mountain-access road in the city, just east of St. Joseph's Hospital, where it is a one-way street going north and tunnels underneath the Hunter Street Railway bridge and continues onward to the city's North End at the waterfront, where it ends at Guise Street East, the site of Pier 9.

== History ==
Talk of creating a townsite at what is now the intersection of John and Main streets arose as early as 1809, but the war delayed the scheme until 1816 when George Hamilton and Nathaniel Hughson successfully promoted Hamilton as the judicial centre for the counties of Halton and Wentworth (the Gore District).

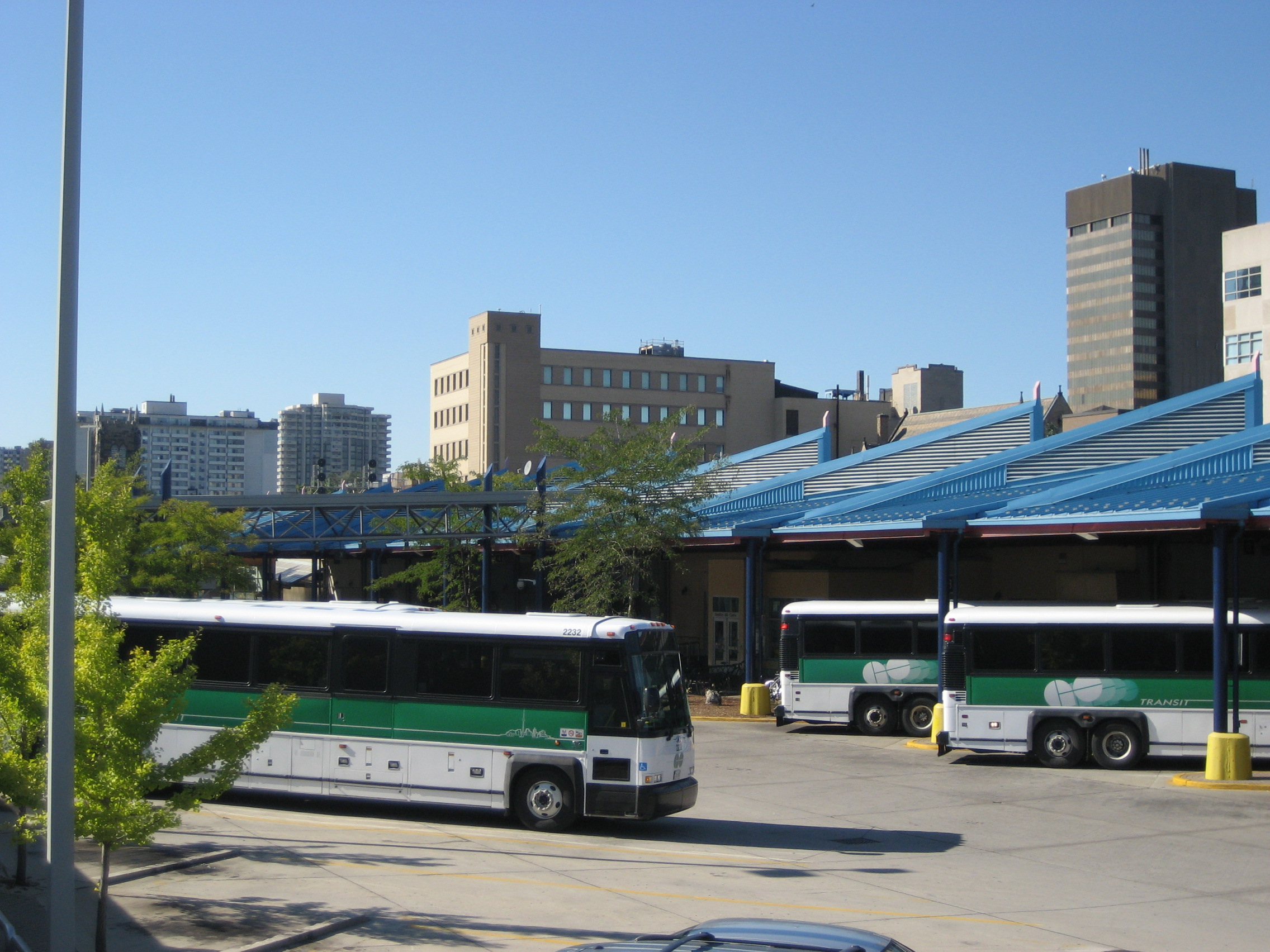
GO Transit station, view from John & Haymarket Streets

When the Town of Hamilton was incorporated in 1833, one of the first orders of business was to find a suitable place for the town board to meet. For the first few years they made do with meeting in local taverns such as Thomas Wilson's Inn on the corner of John and Jackson Streets.

John Street is also one of the original native pathways in the area. In 1837, the police commission officially named it John Street - a name originally chosen by George Hamilton (City founder), apparently in honour of a family of early settlers.

The John A. Macdonald Statue at Gore Park arrived in Hamilton from London, England on 30 October 1893. Official dedication of the statue took place 1 November 1893. Originally, the statue was located at the intersection of King and Hughson Streets and pointed West. Prime Minister Sir John Thompson was in attendance. Alexander Aitchison, a local Hamilton Fire Chief, died of injuries he sustained from crashing into the base of the statue with his horse and buggy and because of it, the statue was then relocated to Gore Park near King and John Streets only this time the statue instead of pointing West, now points East.

Ronnie Hawkins came to Canada in 1958. His first gig was at the Golden Rail in Hamilton near the corner of King and John Streets where he became an overnight success. It was a result of Hawkins success in Hamilton that he decided to move to Canada permanently. His career spans over five decades and 25 records. His hits include, "Forty Days", "Mary Lou", and "Hey Bo Diddley".

== Landmarks ==
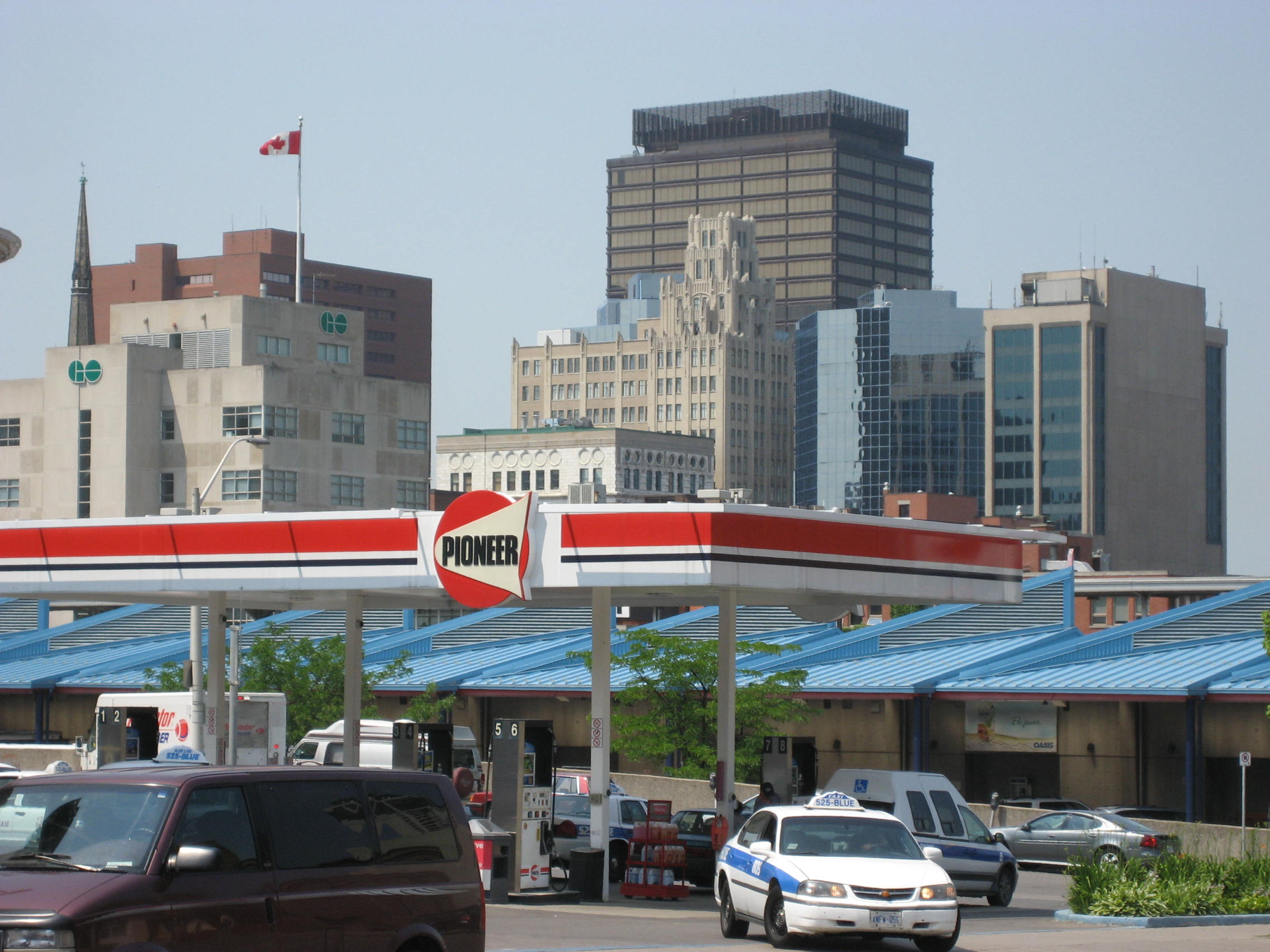
John Street South, walking tour

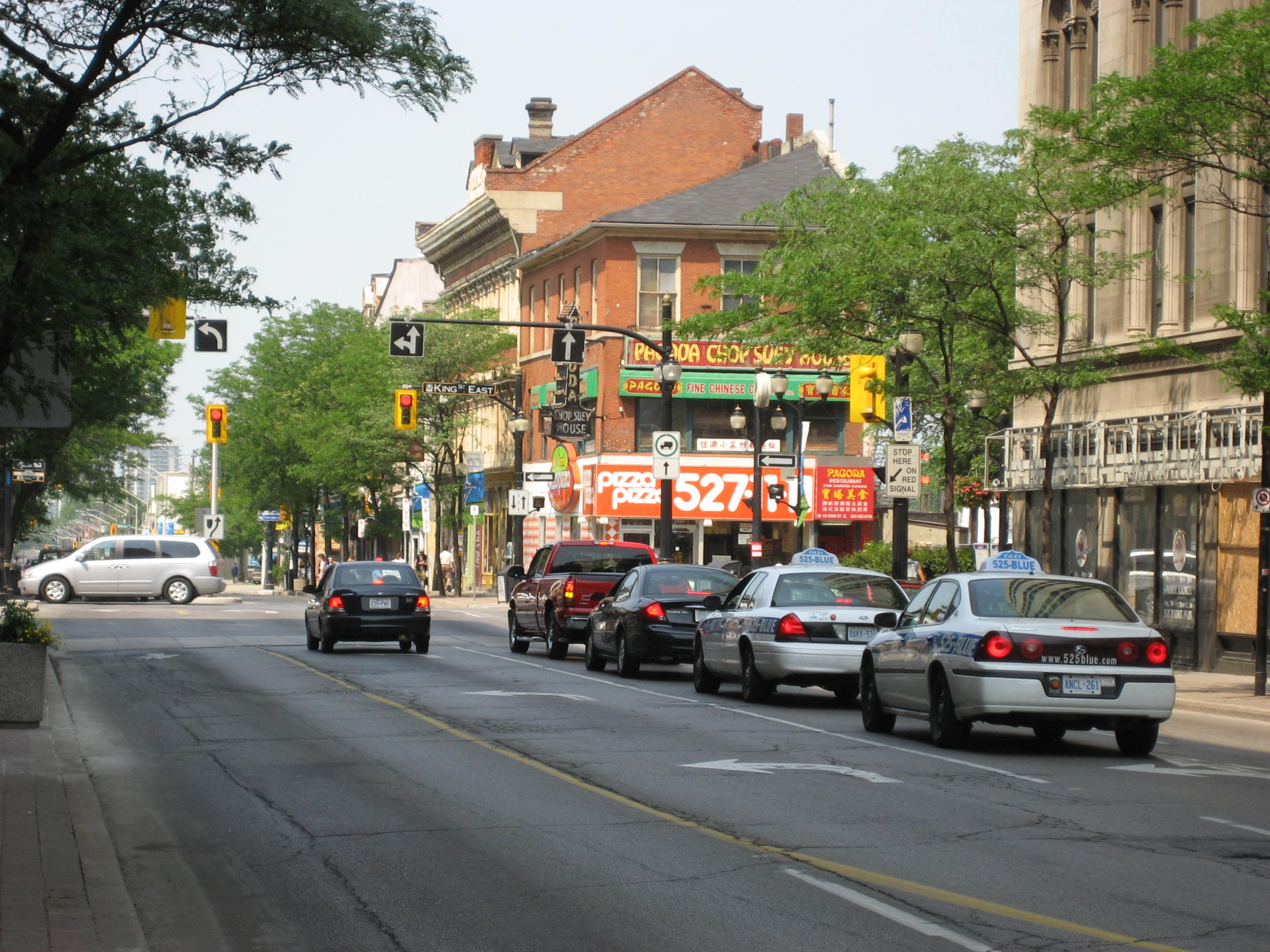
John Street South, walking tour

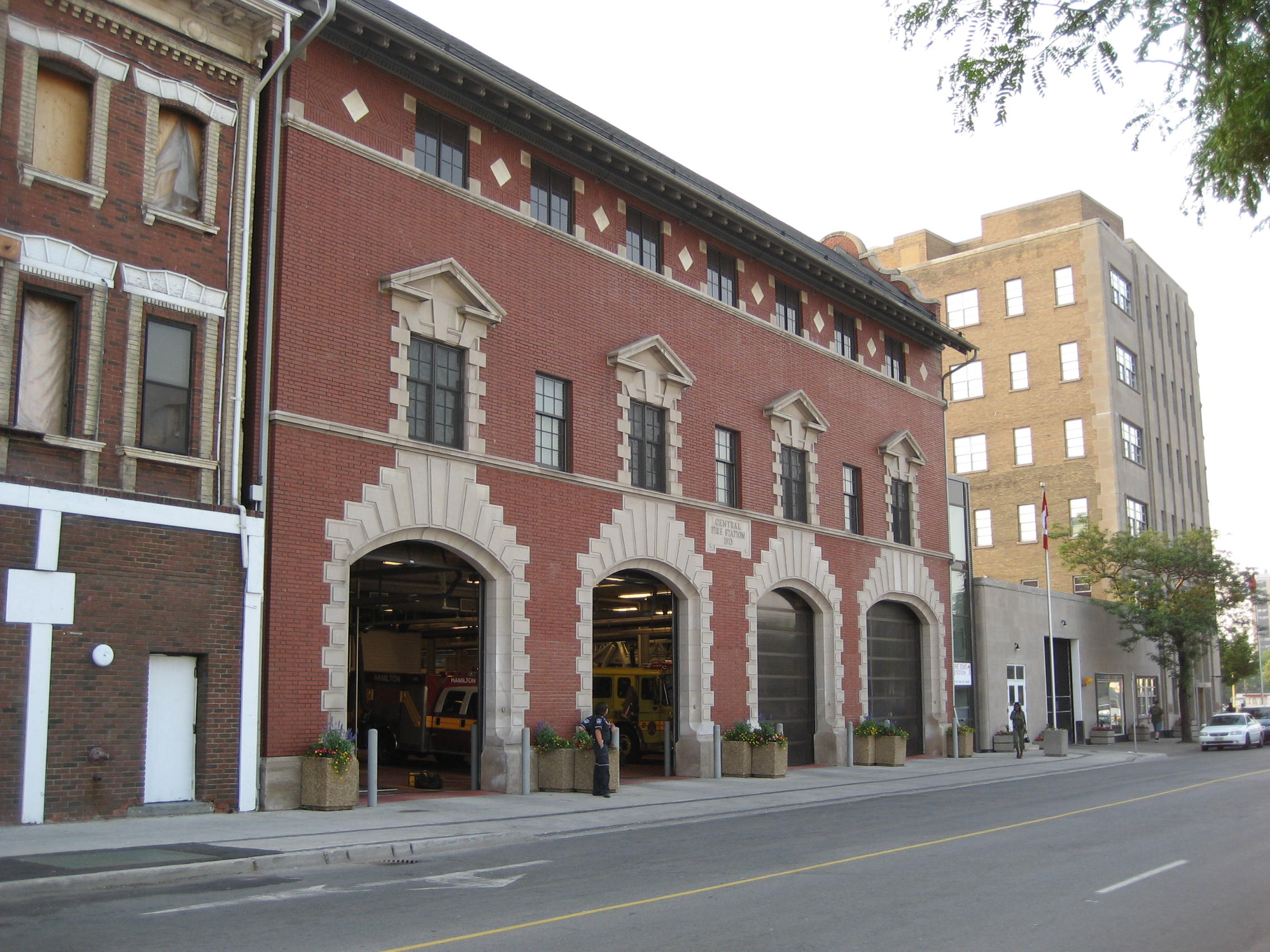
Hamilton Central Fire Station

Note: Listing of Landmarks from North to South.

- Pier 9
- Hamilton Waterfront Trail
- McLaren Park
- Canadian National railway overpass
- Stewart Memorial Church (originally St. Paul's African Methodist Episcopal Church. 1961 became a Masonic Hall. North of Wilson Street)
- Hamilton Urban Core Community Health Centre (originally downtown Bus terminal)
- Hamilton Hydro-Electric System Building
- Hamilton Central Fire Department
- Gore Park
- John A. Macdonald statue (Gore Park)
- War Memorial Monument (Gore Park)
- Royal Connaught Hotel/ Holiday Inn
- The London Tap House (5-storey entertainment complex including Hamilton's first rooftop patio restaurant)
- John Sopinka Courthouse
- United Empire Loyalists statue (in front of the Hamilton Courthouse)
- The Hamilton Courthouse
- New Horizon Office Building (Tailgate Charlie's restaurant/ bar)
- T.H.& B. Railway Bridge
- Blue Line Taxi Cab Company
- Oakland Square (shopping plaza)
- Church of the Ascension
- Olympia Apartments, just east of John Street South on Charlton Avenue East (Hamilton's 3rd-tallest building)
- St. Joseph's Hospital
- Arkledun Avenue/ Jolley Cut, Mountain-access roads

== Communities ==
Note: Listing of neighbourhoods from North to South

- North End - Everything north of the Canadian National Railway tracks
- Central/ Beasley, John Street is the division between these two neighbourhoods.
- Corktown

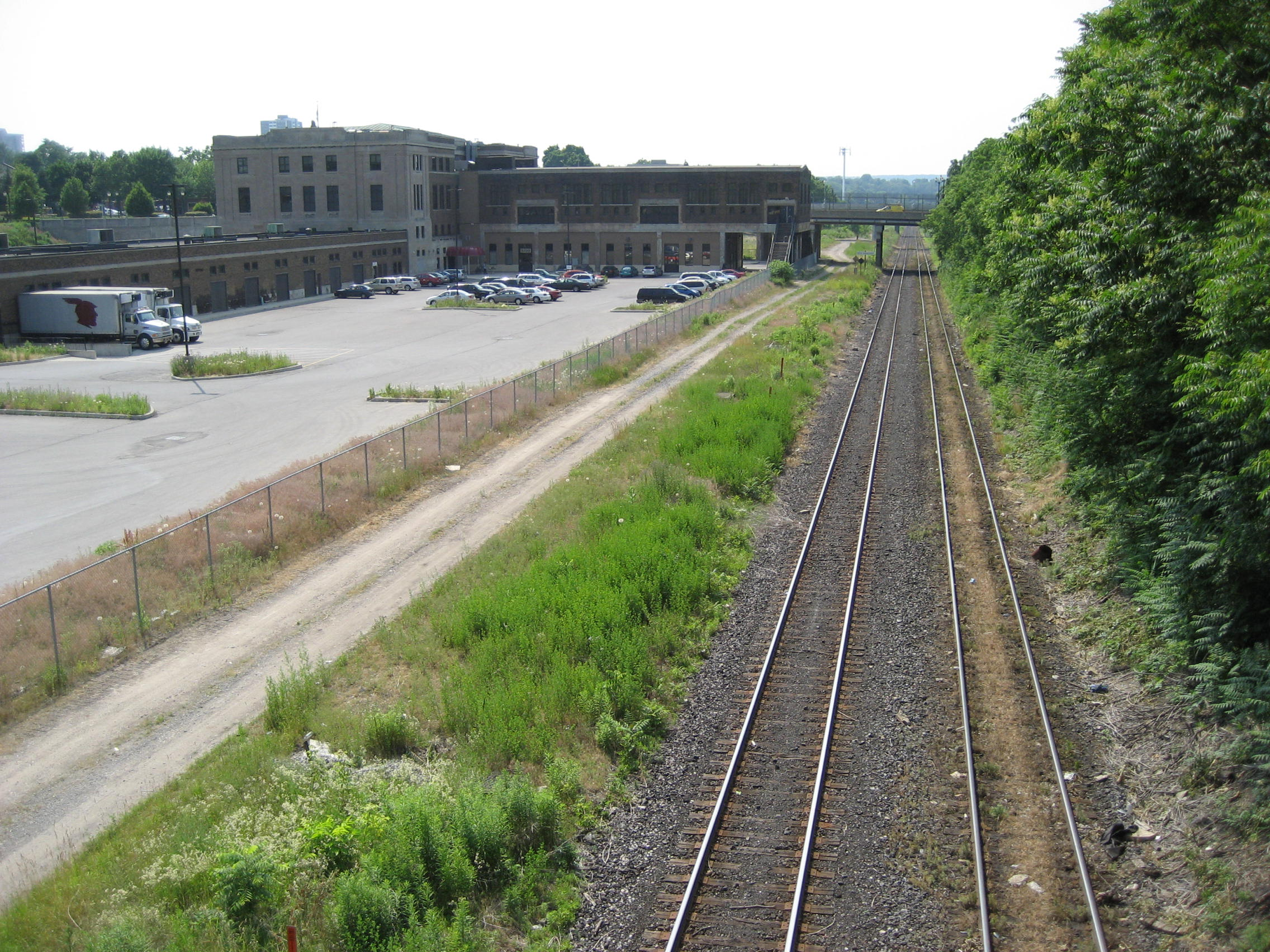
C.N. Railway tracks, LIUNA Station in background

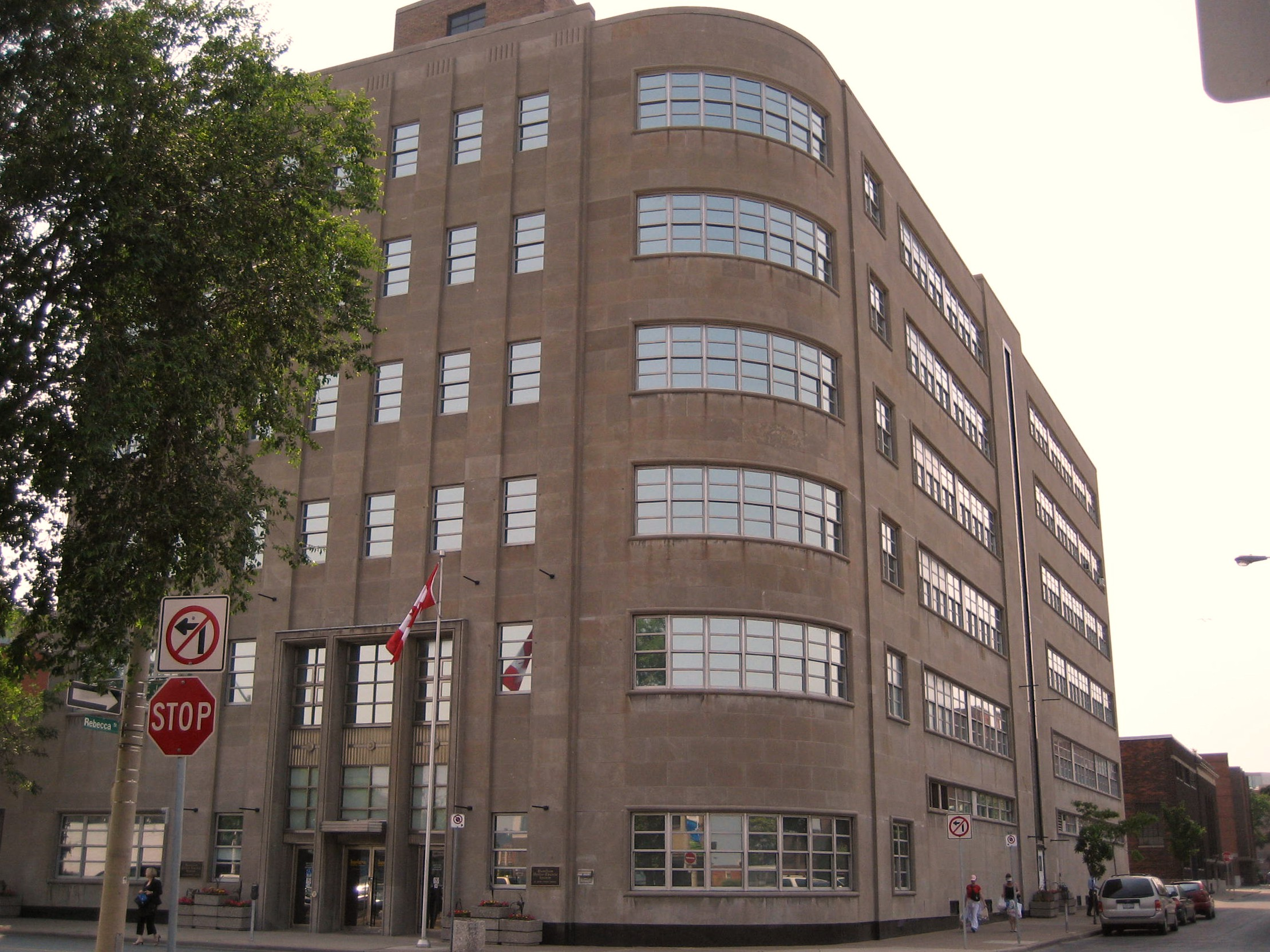
Hamilton Hydro-Electric System Building

== Images ==
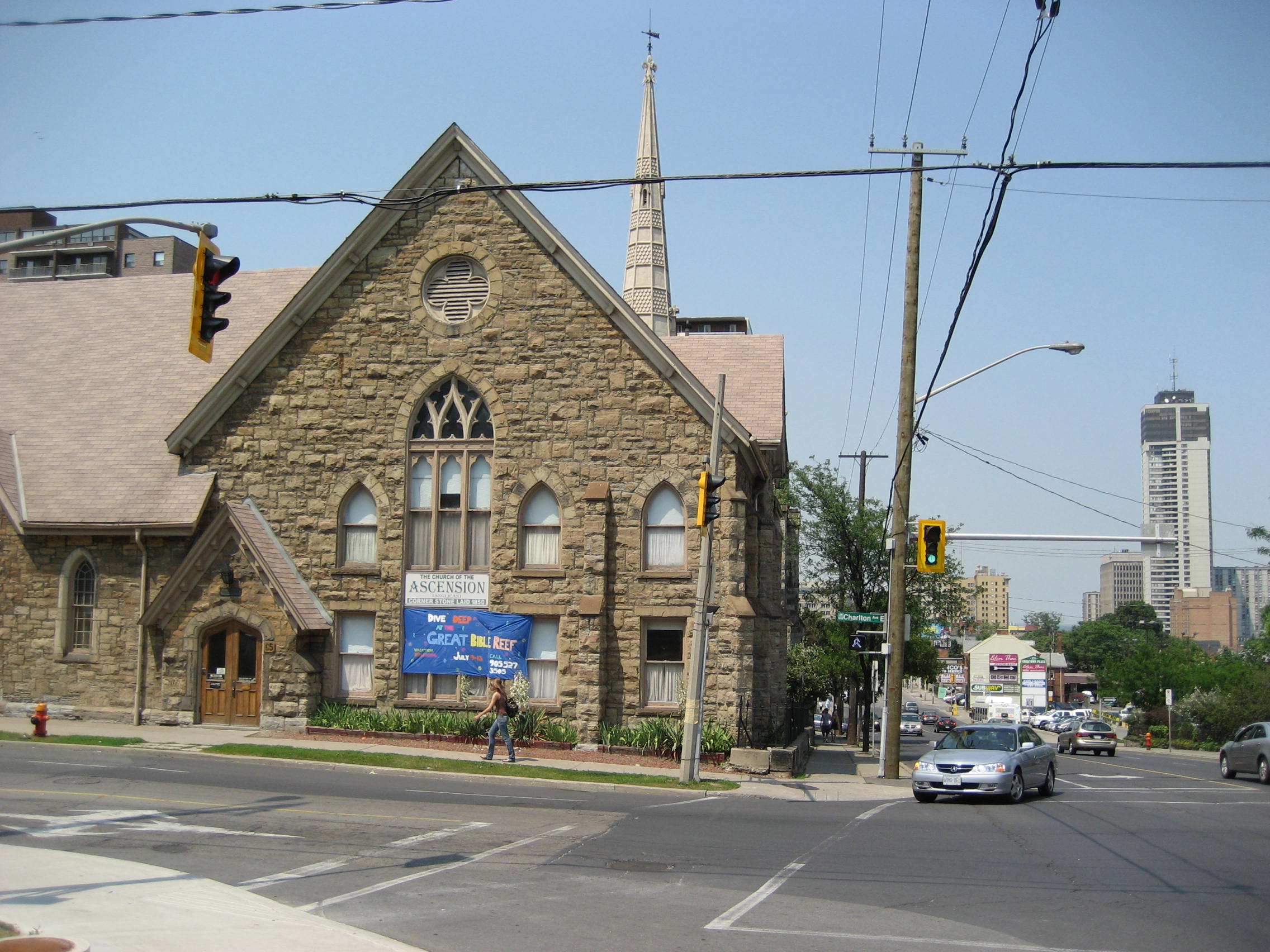
John Street South

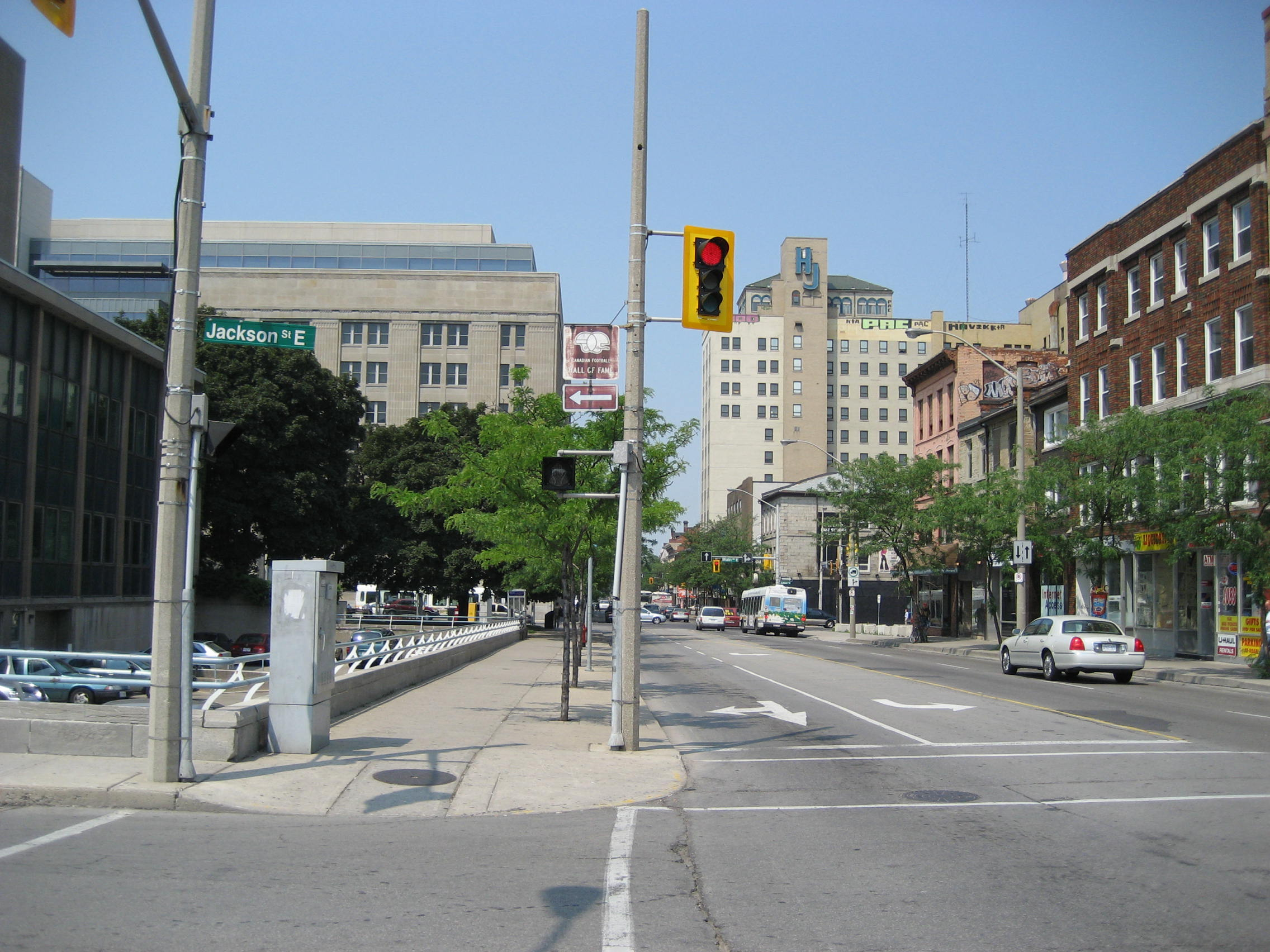
John Street South

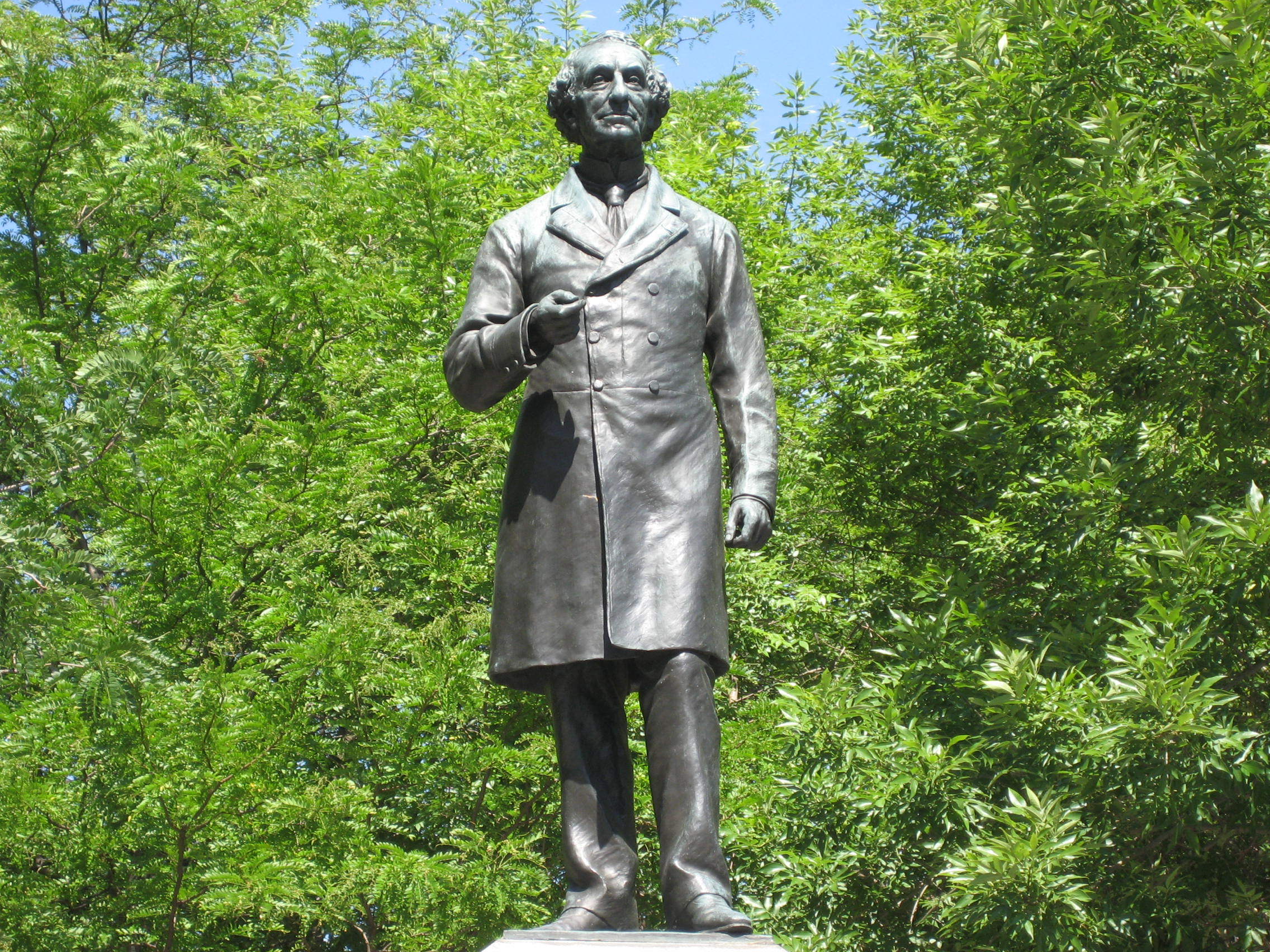
Sir John A. Macdonald, statue, Gore Park

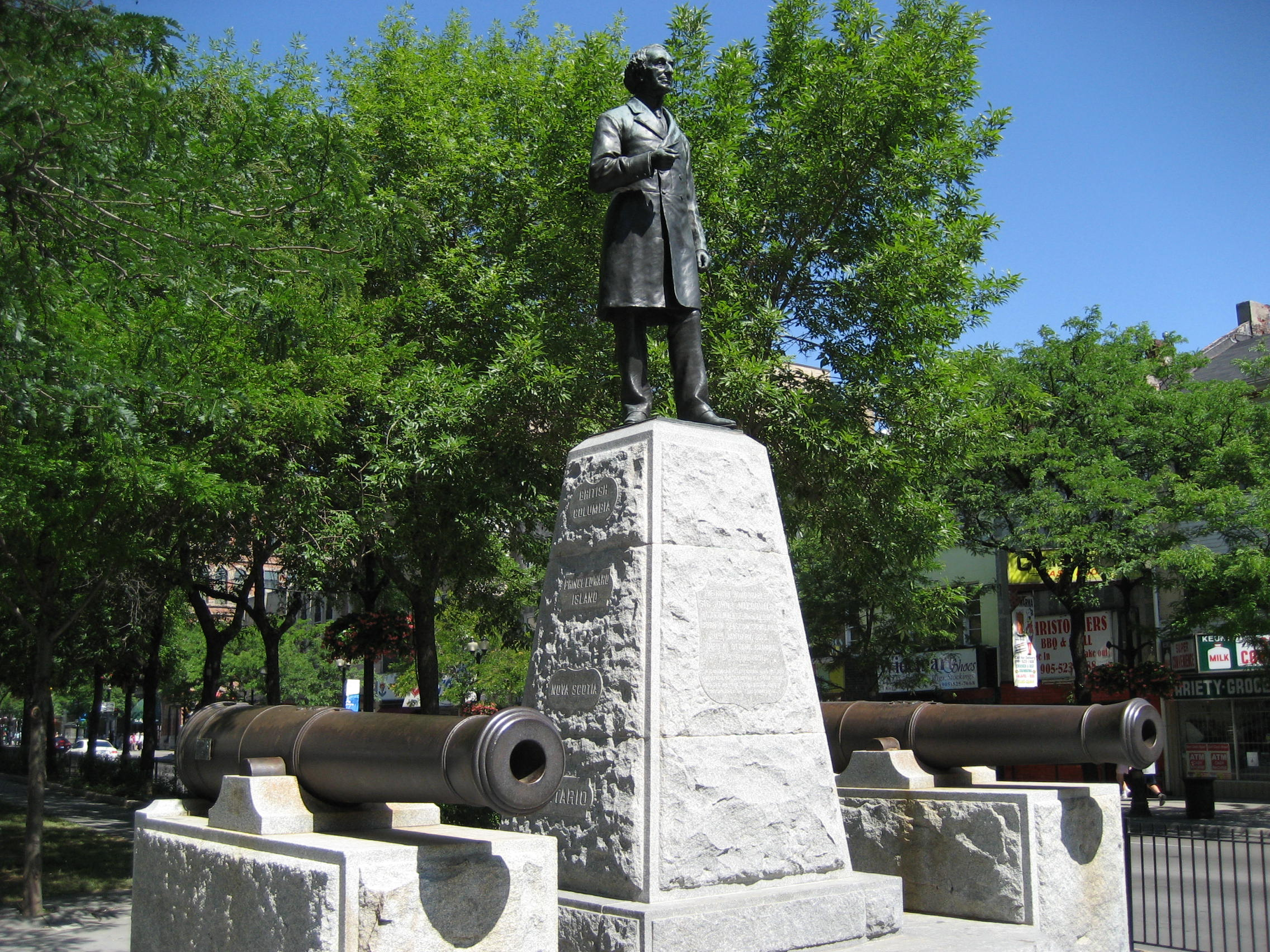
Sir John A. Macdonald, statue, Gore Park
