= Gore Park (Hamilton, Ontario) =

Park in Hamilton, Ontario, Canada

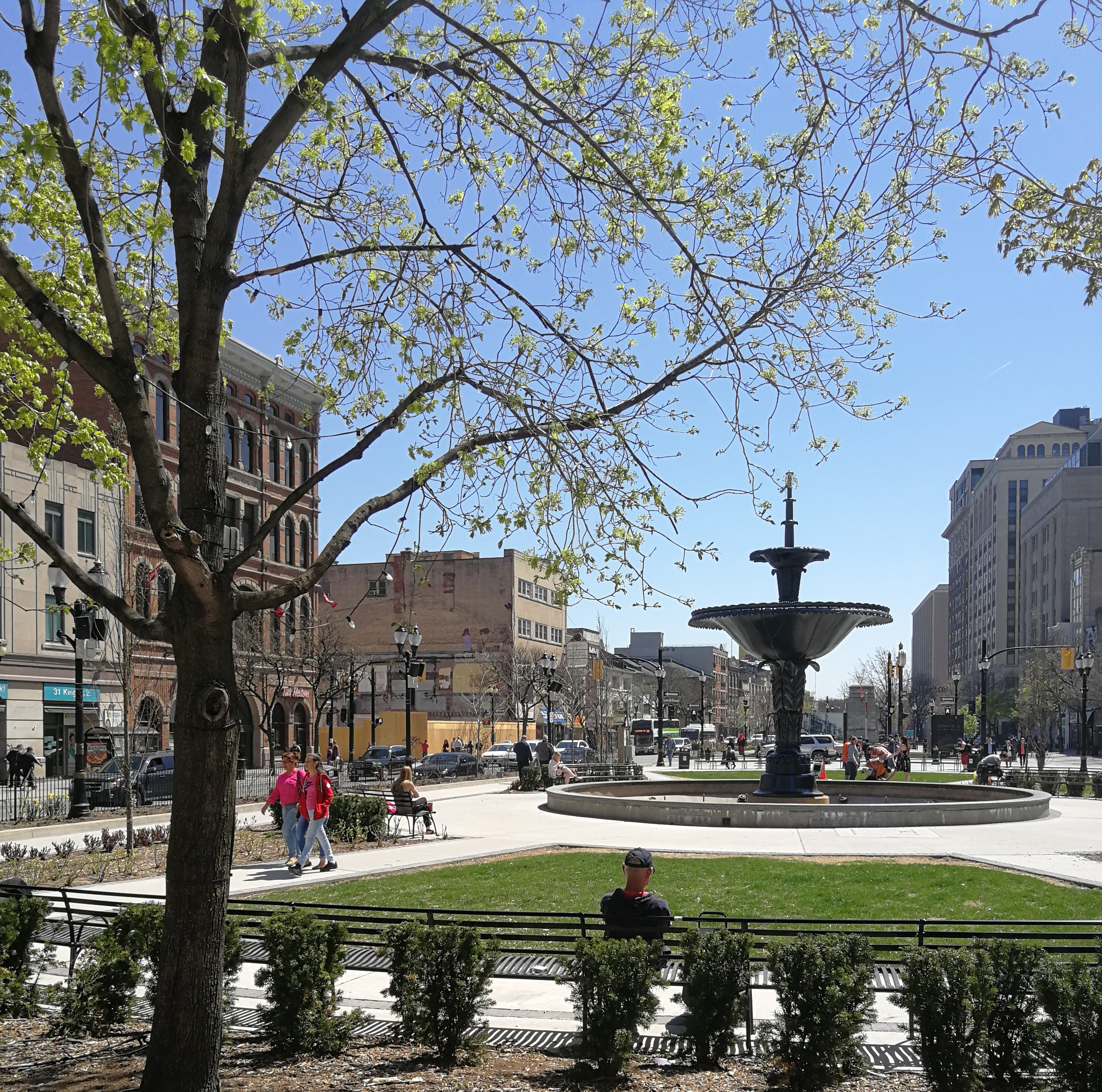
- Gore Park and its fountain in downtown Hamilton
- Interactive map of Gore Park
- Type: Urban park
- Location: 1 Hughson Street South, Hamilton, Ontario, Canada
- Coordinates: 43.2561611°N 79.8683481°W
- Created: 1850
- Owner: City of Hamilton
- Public transit: HSR 1 King, 2 Barton, 3 Cannon, 5 Delaware, 10 B Line Express, 51 University Special
- Website: https://www.hamilton.ca/parks-recreation/parks-trails-and-beaches/parks-listing

Gore Park is a town square or urban park located in downtown Hamilton, Ontario.

== Name ==
The park is located in the angle formed by James Street to the west, two separate sections of King Street to the north and south, and John Street to the east. Thin wedges of land that did not fit into square survey grids, like the land which Gore Park occupies, used to be called gores. The name of the park is thus a reference to its triangular shape that stands out among the predominantly square grid of the city.

== History ==
The ground where the park is now located was once part of a Crown land grant to the prominent merchant John Askin Sr. It was later sold to Nathaniel Hughson Sr., then to James Durand, before coming into the possession of George Hamilton in 1816.

Before becoming a public space, the gore of land between King, James and John streets had served as a dump, lumber yard, and planned city market square in 1830s. In the 1840s there were numerous plans to develop the land, but these proved contentious. In 1853 it was proposed to locate a new post office on the underused land, but this was also rejected. Instead, an ornamental fountain was erected in 1860, and in 1873 the land was laid out as a park and planted with flowers and shrubs.

== Features ==
The most prominent feature in the park is the central fountain. This original fountain was unveiled in 1860, to commemorate the Royal tour of Queen Victoria's son and heir, Edward Albert. The original fountain was dismantled in 1959, and a replica of the original fountain was erected in 1996 as part of Hamilton's Sesquicentennial.

The park also contains a memorial to Queen Victoria by Philipe Hebert, c. 1908.

Gore Park is home to the Hamilton Cenotaph / Gore Park Veterans Memorial by William Russell Souter, c. 1923. This monument commemorates the residents of Hamilton who served in the First World War.

Until the summer of 2021, the park contained a memorial to Sir John A. Macdonald by George Edward Wade, c. 1893. The statue of MacDonald was toppled by protesters following multiple discoveries of unmarked graves at former Canadian residential school sites, and has not been restored at its original location since.

== Gallery ==
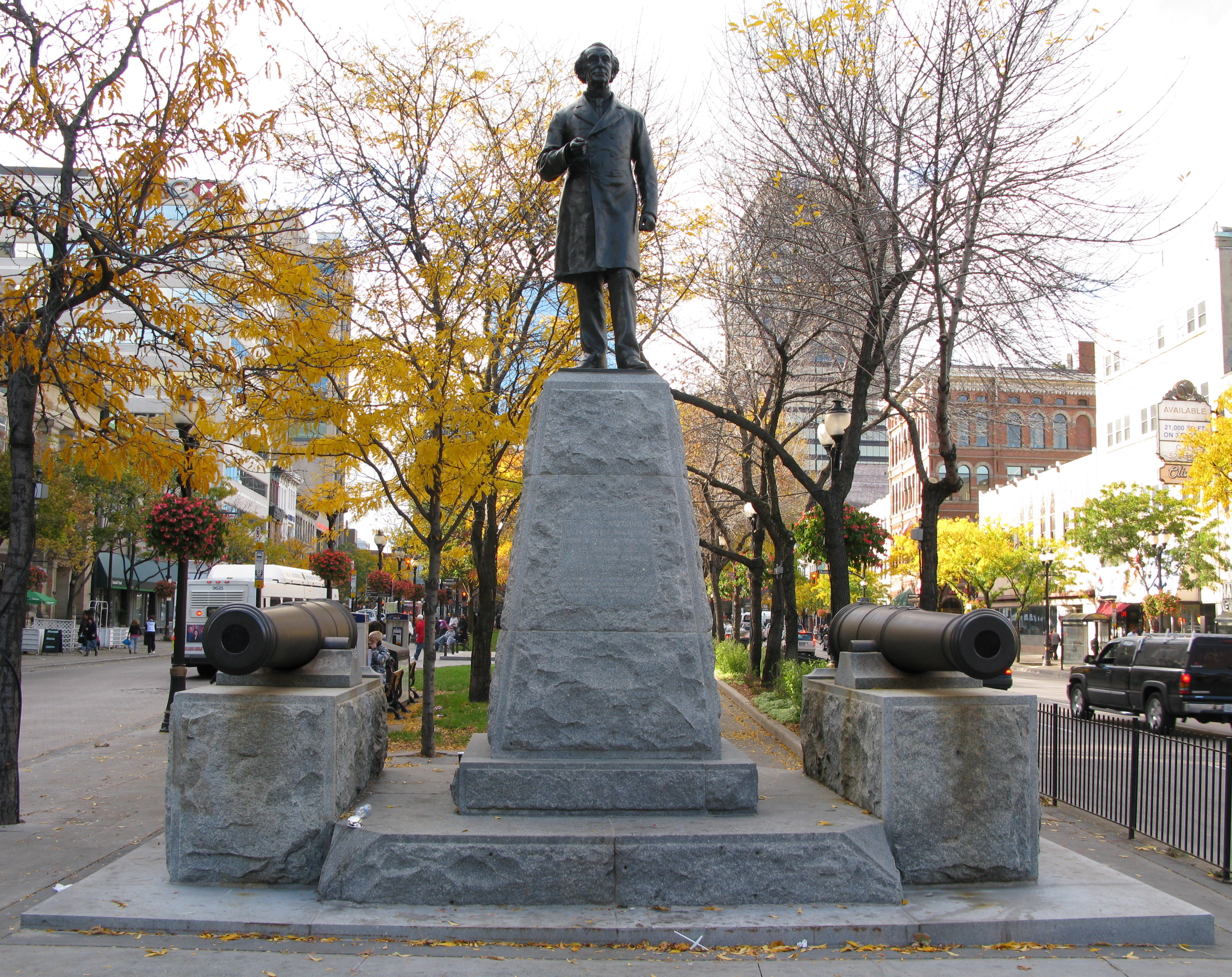
Memorial to Sir John A. Macdonald

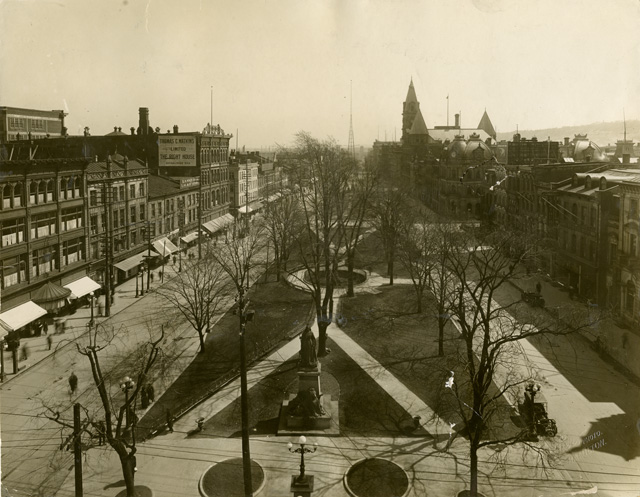
Gore Park, ca. 1913

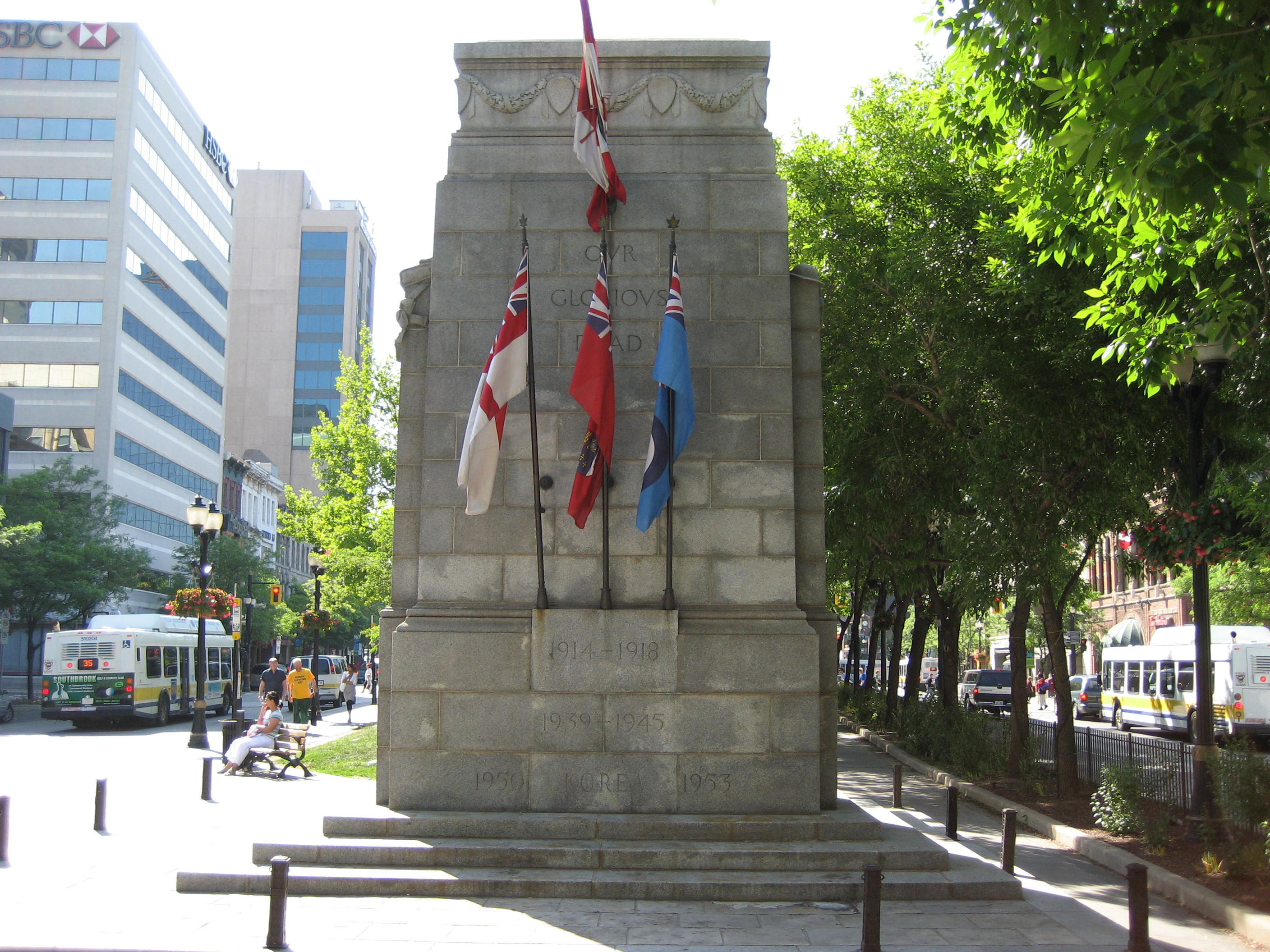
Hamilton Cenotaph in Gore Park

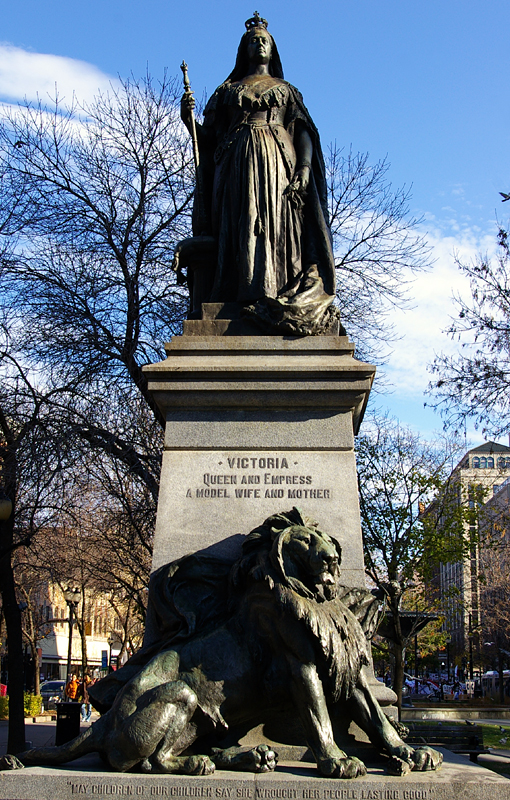
Memorial to Queen Victoria

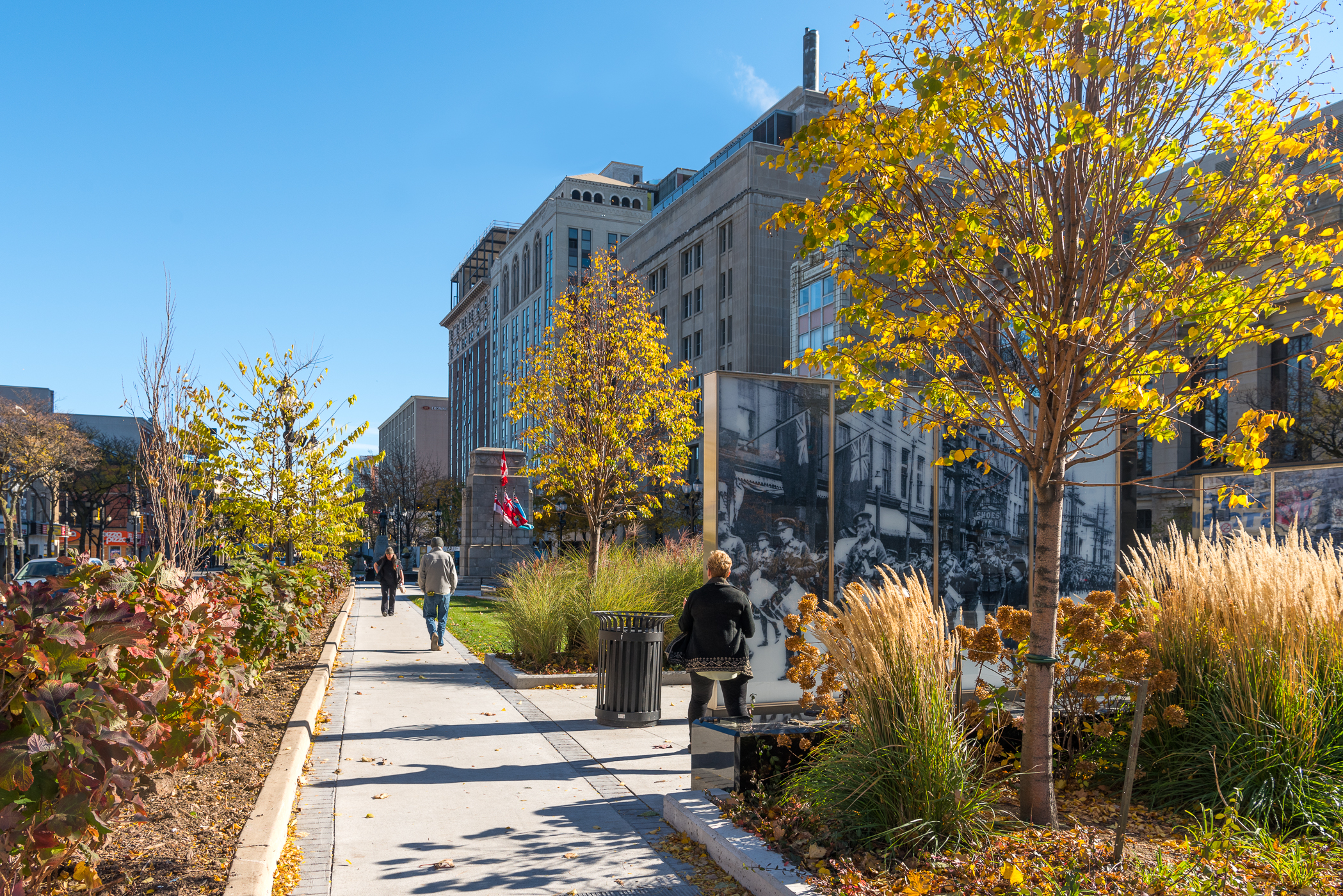
Gore Park looking east towards the cenotaph
