= George Edward Wade =

British sculptor

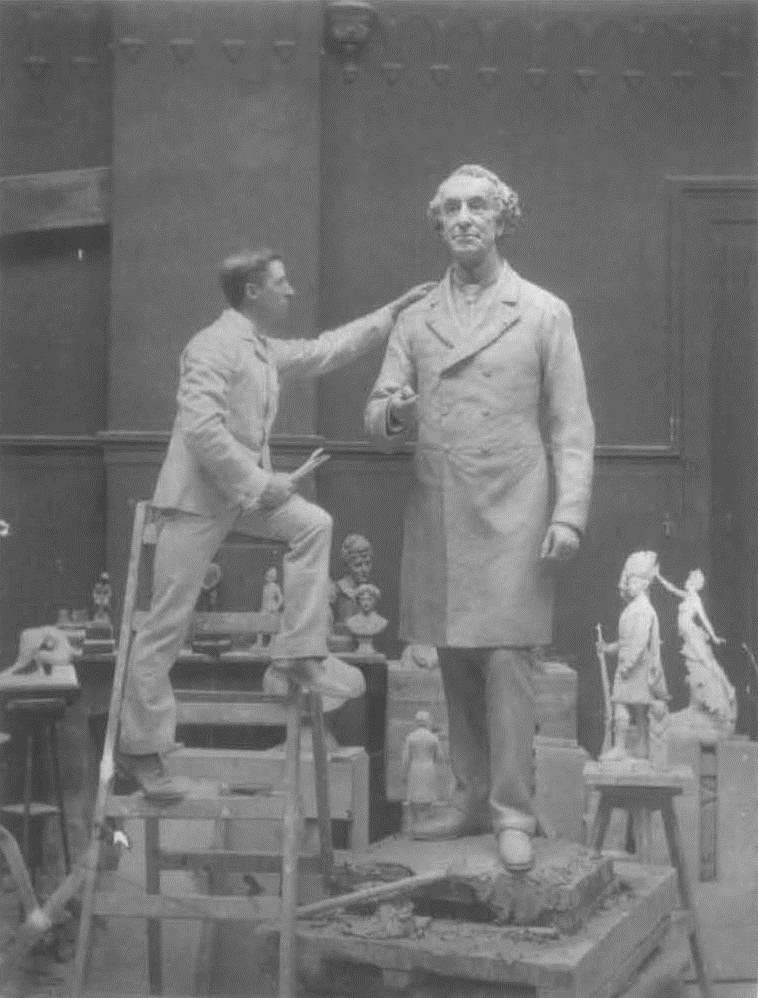
- Wade working on statue of John A. Macdonald
- Born: 1853; London
- Died: 5 February 1933 (Aged 80)
- Known for: Sculpture

George Edward Wade (1853, London – 5 February 1933) was a British sculptor. He was largely self-taught as an artist and is best remembered for his statues of royalty and politicians.

He was baptised on 17 April 1853 at Westminster, London, England. He was the fourteen children of the Rev. Canon Nugent Wade and Louisa (born Fenwick). His elder sister was Louisa Anne Wade who led the Royal School of Needlework. Another brother was architect and textile designer Fairfax Blomfield Wade-Palmer.

In 1929 Wade had two works dedicated in London, to Catherine and William Booth. Booth was the first General of The Salvation Army and she was the "Army Mother." Mrs. Booth presents a "serene and matronly figure", while he is "an Old Testament figure with eyes ablaze, beard flowing, finger pointing, medals mustered, and a small prayer book in his hand."

== Selected works ==
- Bust of Ignacy Jan Paderewski 1891

"500 copies of his likeness of the pianist Paderewski went out to America alone.

- Sir John A. Macdonald Memorial, Gore Park (Hamilton, Ontario) c. 1893
- The Macdonald Monument, Montreal, Quebec, Canada. 1895
- Queen Victoria Statue, Colombo, Sri Lanka 1897
- Lady Henry Somerset Memorial, London, 1897 (stolen 1971 and replaced by a copy in 1991)

Another casting was placed in Portland, Maine, USA in 1917

- King Edward VII, statue in his coronation robes, Reading, Berkshire, unveiled November 1902.
- Three former statues of Statue Square, Hong Kong: Edward VII (1907), Queen Alexandra (1909), Mary of Teck, Princess of Wales and future Queen Mary (1909).
- Alexandra of Denmark, London, 1908
- Field Marshal Douglas Haig, Edinburgh Castle, Edinburgh, 1923
- William Booth, London, 1929
- Catherine Booth, 1929
