= One Town (Visakhapatnam) =

- Neighbourhood
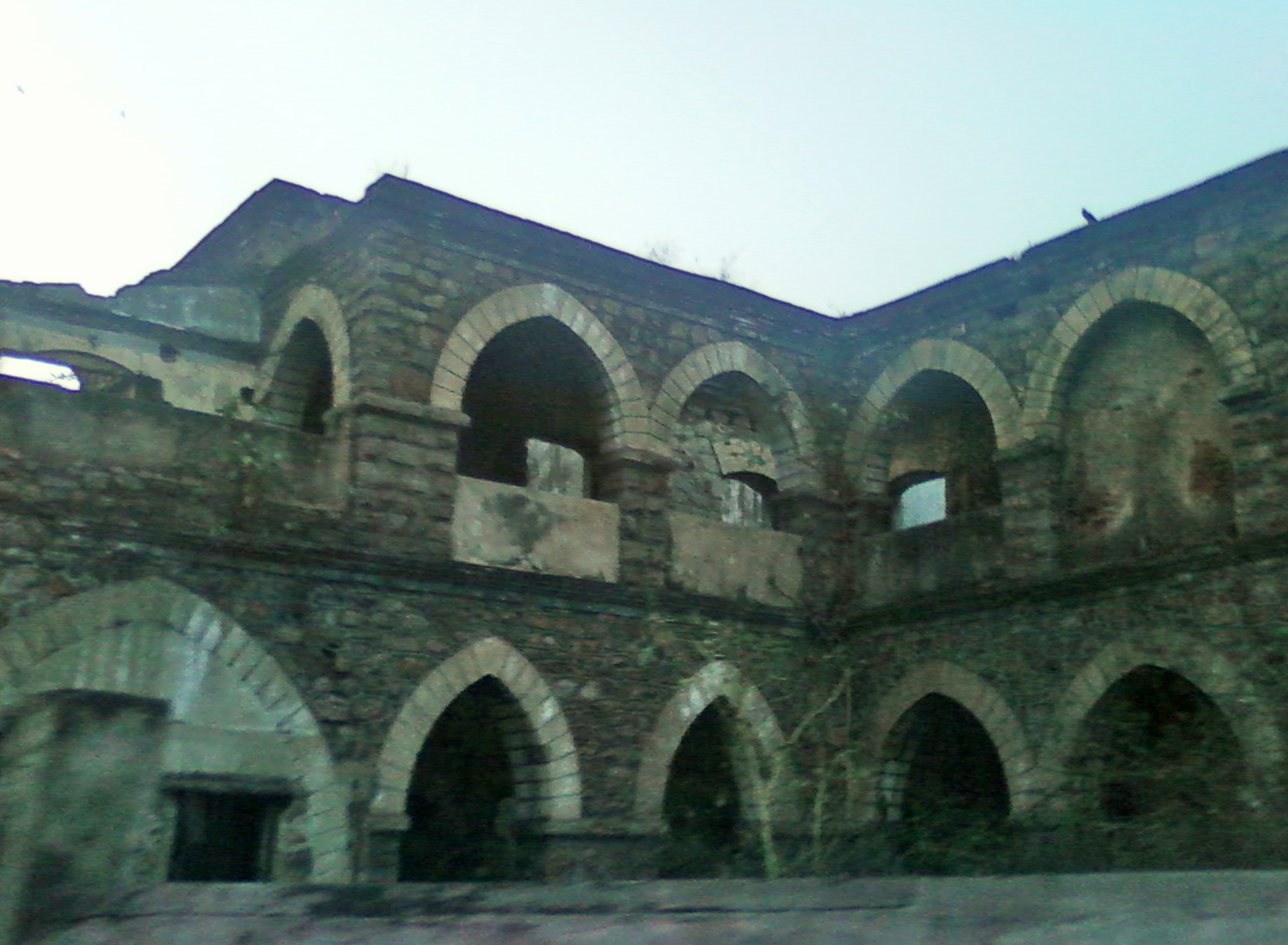
- Old British Customs house in one town area

- Location in Visakhapatnam
- Coordinates: 17.695620°N 83.293901°E
- Country: India
- State: Andhra Pradesh
- District: Visakhapatnam

Government
  - Body: Greater Visakhapatnam Municipal Corporation

Languages
  - Official: Telugu
- Time zone: UTC+5:30 (IST)
- PIN: 530001
- Vehicle registration: AP-31

One Town also called the "old town", is located in Visakhapatnam City, India. The area falls under the local administrative limits of Greater Visakhapatnam Municipal Corporation,

== History ==
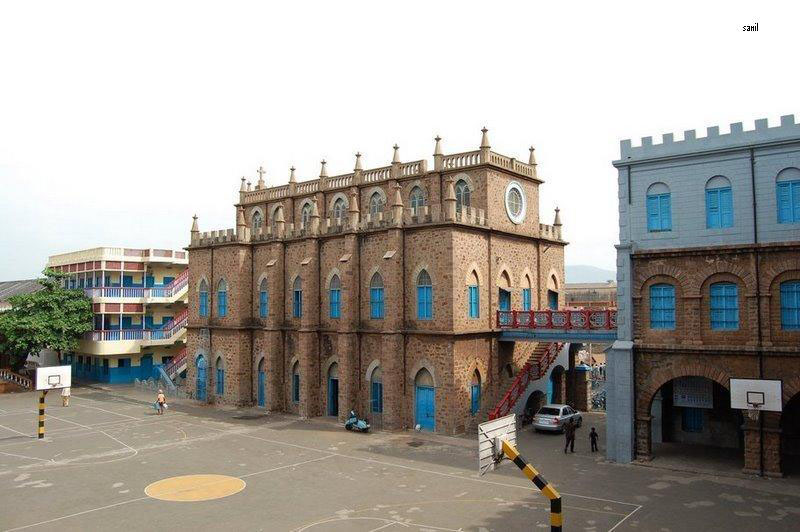
St Aloysius' Anglo-Indian High School (SAS) established in 1847 in One Town

Vizag's old town area or one town area has more than 300 years of history in British era the business of whole city was located here including the administration of Vizagapatam District. There are many old monuments built here like Town Hall Visakhapatnam (1904), Kurapam Market (1914), European Cemetery (1699), Queen Victoria Pavilion (1904), St John's Church (1844), Queen Mary's school (1800), Ishaq Madina dargah (1706), St Aloysius' Anglo-Indian High School (1847) and the Lighthouse (1903).

== About ==
The Old Town area runs from turner choultry to end of Visakhapatnam Port. It has many historical educational institutions there are so many middle class students are learning education here. The area is administered by Greater Visakhapatnam Municipal Corporation.

== Transport ==
There are many buses running to every corner of the city from here.

APSRTC routes

Route number	Start	End	Via
25K	Bakkannapalem	Old Head Post Office	Madhurawada, Yendada, Hanumanthuwaka, Maddilapalem, RTC Complex, Jagadamba Centre, Town Kotharoad
25M	Marikavalasa	Old Head Post Office	Madhurawada, Yendada, Hanumanthuwaka, Maddilapalem, RTC Complex, Jagadamba Centre, Town Kotharoad
25G	Ganeshnagar	Old Head Post Office	Madhurawada, Yendada, Hanumanthuwaka, Maddilapalem, RTC Complex, Jagadamba Centre, Town Kotharoad
25S	YSR Nagar	Old Head Post Office	Madhurawada, Yendada, Hanumanthuwaka, Maddilapalem, RTC Complex, Jagadamba Centre, Town Kotharoad
25E	Kommadi	Old Head Post Office	Madhurawada, Yendada, Hanumanthuwaka, Maddilapalem, RTC Complex, Jagadamba Centre, Town Kotharoad
52D	Ravindra Nagar	Old Head Post Office	Town Kotharoad, Jagadamba Centre, RTC Complex, Maddilapalem, Hanumanthuwaka
52S	Sagarnagar	Old Head Post Office	Town Kotharoad, Jagadamba Centre, RTC Complex, Maddilapalem, Hanumanthuwaka, Visalakshinagar
52E	Peda Rushikonda	Old Head Post Office	Town Kotharoad, Jagadamba Centre, RTC Complex, Maddilapalem, Hanumanthuwaka, Yendada, Rushikonda
20A	HB Colony	Old Head Post Office	Town Kotharoad, Jagadamba Centre, RTC Complex, Gurudwar, Satyam Junction, Seethammadhara
17K	Bhimili	Old Head Post Office	Town Kotharoad, Jagadamba Centre, RTC Complex, Siripuram, Pedawaltair, Appughar, Sagarnagar, Rushikonda, Thimmapuram, INS Kalinga
60	Simhachalam	Old Head Post Office	Town Kotharoad, Jagadamba Centre, RTC Complex, Maddilapalem, Hanumanthuwaka, Arilova, Adavivaram
6	Old Head Post Office	Simhachalam	Town Kotharoad, Convent, Kancharapalem, NAD Kotharoad, Gopalapatnam
6K	Old Head Post Office	Kothavalasa	Town Kotharoad, Convent, Kancharapalem, NAD Kotharoad, Gopalapatnam, Vepagunta, Pendurthi
60C	Arilova Colony	Old Head Post Office	Town Kotharoad, Jagadamba Centre, RTC Complex, Maddilapalem, Hanumanthuwaka
