= Visakhapatnam Town Hall =

Municipal building in Visakhapatnam, India

- Interactive map of the Visakhapatnam Town Hall area

General information
- Type: Town hall
- Location: Chengal Rao Peta, Visakhapatnam; Andhra Pradesh
- Coordinates: 17.697413°N 83.298484°E
- Construction started: 1893
- Completed: 1904
- Cost: ₹ 50,000
- Owner: Greater Visakhapatnam Municipal Corporation

Technical details
- Floor area: 5,000 sq ft (500 m^{2})

Design and construction
- Civil engineer: R.Mahadeva

Town Hall Visakhapatnam is a municipal building in Visakhapatnam, India.

== History ==
The foundation of town hall is laid on 1893 the construction cost of ₹ 50,000 borrowed from Raja of Bobbili and the town hall is handover to Vizagpatam Municipality at 1904. and the total area of town hall is 5,000 square feet. late 1960'scentre of theatrical, cultural and literary events so so GVMC is Renovated this town hall.
