= Statue of Queen Victoria, Chiang Mai =

Statue of Queen Victoria, Thailand

Coordinates: 18°46′24″N 99°00′17″E

Statue of Queen Victoria
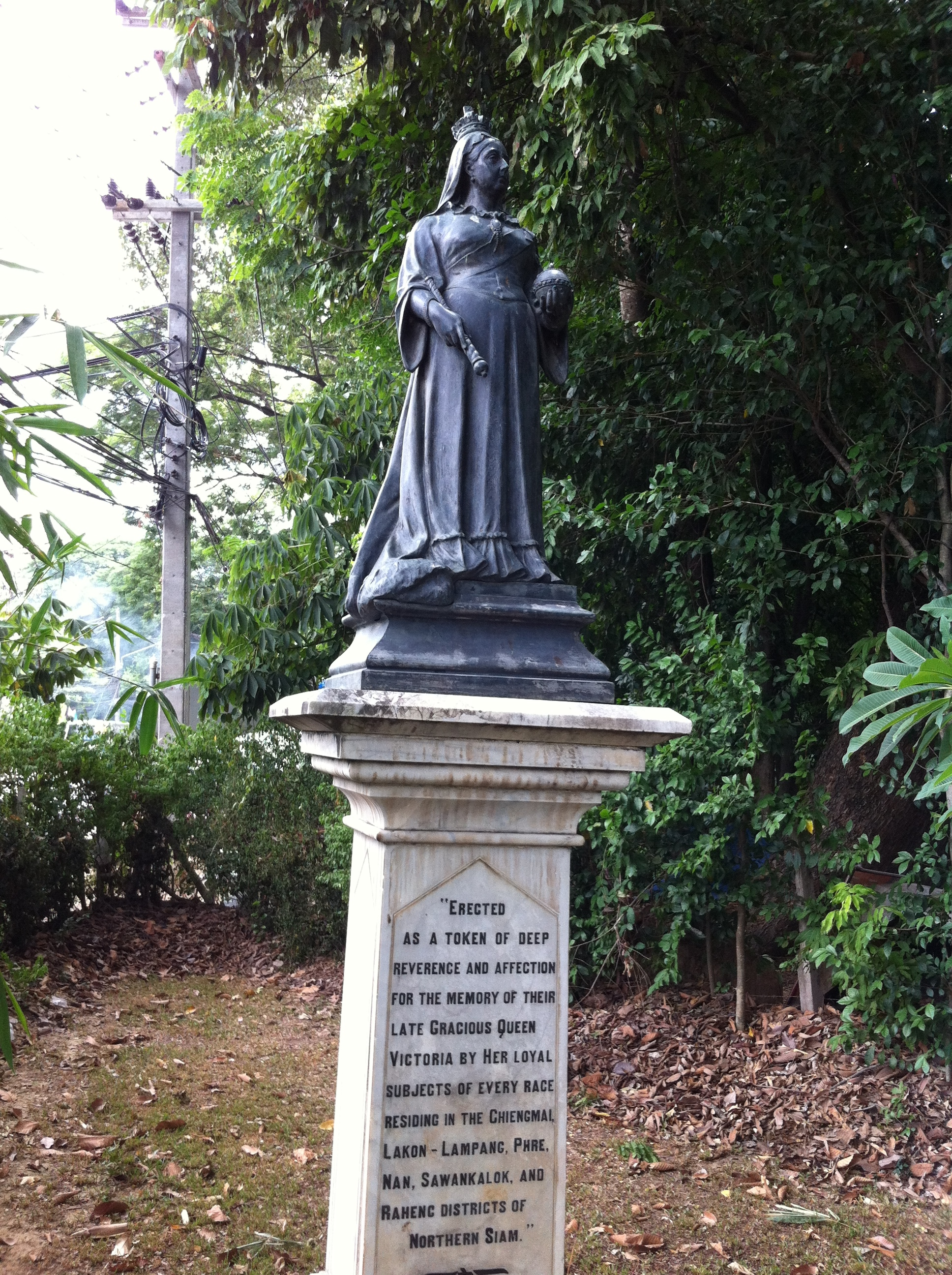
- Artist: Cartwright
- Completion date: 1903
- Medium: Bronze
- Subject: Queen Victoria
- Location: Chiang Mai, Thailand

The statue of Queen Victoria in Chiang Mai, Thailand, is situated in the Chiang Mai Foreign Cemetery at Lamphun Road. The statue was erected in 1903 as a memorial to Queen Victoria, who died on 22 January 1901.

== Background ==
The idea to erect a statue to the late Queen was first proposed at a meeting held at the British consulate in Chiang Mai on 27 April 1901, presided over by the British Consul Mr Beckett, and attended by members of the local British community. There it was resolved to form a committee to raise funds for a statue with Beckett agreeing to act as Honorary Secretary and Treasurer. At a subsequent meeting it was reported that 4,234 rupees had been raised from donors, and it was resolved that the statue would be erected in the grounds of the British Consulate at Chiang Mai.

On 23 July 1902, a bronze statue and base were ordered by the Borneo Company Limited, London, from the Goldsmith and Silversmith Company, London, and a Mr Cartwright was commissioned to create the statue at a cost of £250. The base was constructed of white Perak marble, supplied and engraved by Ravensway and Co., Singapore.

On completion of the statue, the Ben Line company agreed to transport the statue from London to Singapore, but fearing that the statue would not arrive in time for unveiling at Christmas, when a large gathering of traders in the town was expected, it was unloaded at Rangoon after a telegram was sent, and transferred overland, first by rail and then by porters, rafts and elephants, across the Shan States to Chiang Mai.

Arriving in time, it was unveiled at a ceremony held on 24 December 1903 by Phya Surasri, the Siamese Commissioner of the Chiang Mai District, in the presence of C. E. W. Stringer, the British Consul. On the base are inscribed the following words:

Erected as a token of deep reverence and affection for the memory of their late Gracious Queen Victoria by her loyal subjects of every race residing in the Chiengmei, Lakon-Lampang, Phre, Nan, Sawankalok, and Raheng Districts of Northern Siam.

The statue, it was said, was worshipped by Thais as a fertility goddess where religious offerings were placed, and during the Second World War, when it was protected inside a wooden box, two holes were made so the eyes could continue to look out at worshippers.

It remained in the grounds of the British Consulate until 1978 when the building and land were sold, and the statue was moved to the Chiang Mai Foreign Cemetery.
