= Queen Victoria Pavilion =

Statue of Queen Victoria in Visakhapatnam, India

- 17.695419°N 83.292637°E
- Location: One Town, Visakhapatnam, India
- Type: Statue
- Material: bronze
- Opening date: 4 May 1904; 120 years ago
- Dedicated to: Queen Victoria

Queen Victoria Pavilion is one of the oldest statues in Visakhapatnam. It is located in the One Town area of Visakhapatnam.

== History ==
In the year 1900, Raja G.V. Jugga Rao, the Zamindar of Shermuhammadpuram and Raja Ankitam Venkata Jagga Rao of Yambrum Estates visited Britain. On their way back, the British Government presented with a bronze statue of Queen Victoria. The statue was meant to be a present to the city and hence it was brought and affixed in One Town locality of Visakhapatnam.
