= Marshall Wood =

English sculptor and medalist

Marshall Wood (c. 1834 – 16 July 1882) was an English sculptor, medalist, and artist, and the younger brother of Shakespeare Wood.

Wood was born in Manchester, the son of Hamilton Wood (c.1805–1811), a merchant and manufacturer. He began showing work at the Royal Academy in 1854, and was a regular exhibitor for the next twenty years. He also showed work in Edinburgh in 1856. By 1871 his wife, children and two servants were resident in Reigate. The Art Journal credits Wood with having executed statues of Queen Victoria for Melbourne, Sydney, Montreal, Calcutta, and Ottawa. Wood also executed three portraits of the Prince of Wales (shown at the RA in 1863, 1864 and 1875) and a bust of the Princess of Wales.

== Selected works ==
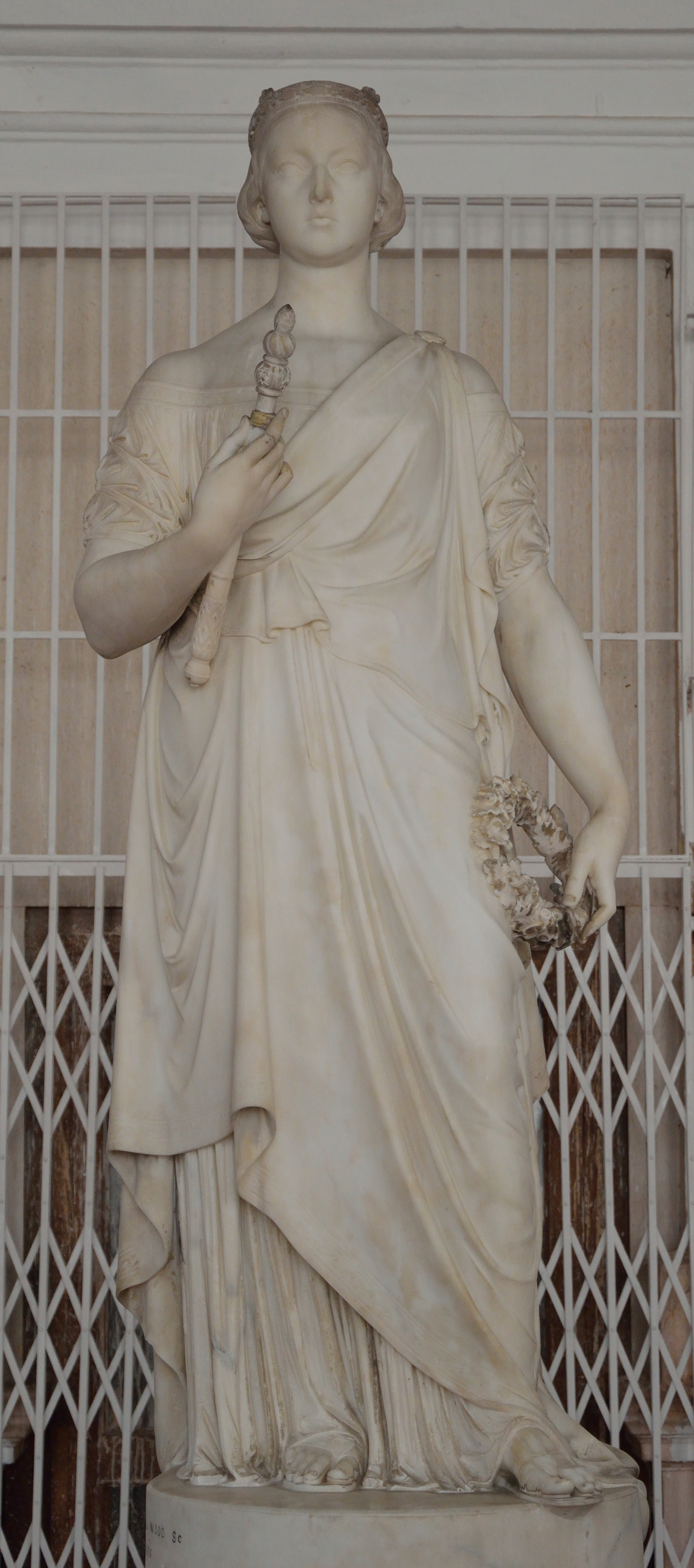
Alexandrina Victoria, 1875 CE; Indian Museum, Kolkata

- Daphne
- Hebe
- Musidora
- Proserpine
- Siren
- Song of the Shirt
- Queen Victoria, various locations, various dates
  - Musée de la civilisation, Quebec City
- Richard Cobden, St Ann's Square, Manchester
- Albert Edward, Prince of Wales, 1863
- Alexandra, Princess of Wales, 1867
- Richard Cobden, 1867
