= Crowne Plaza Christchurch =

Office high rise in Christchurch Central City, New Zealand

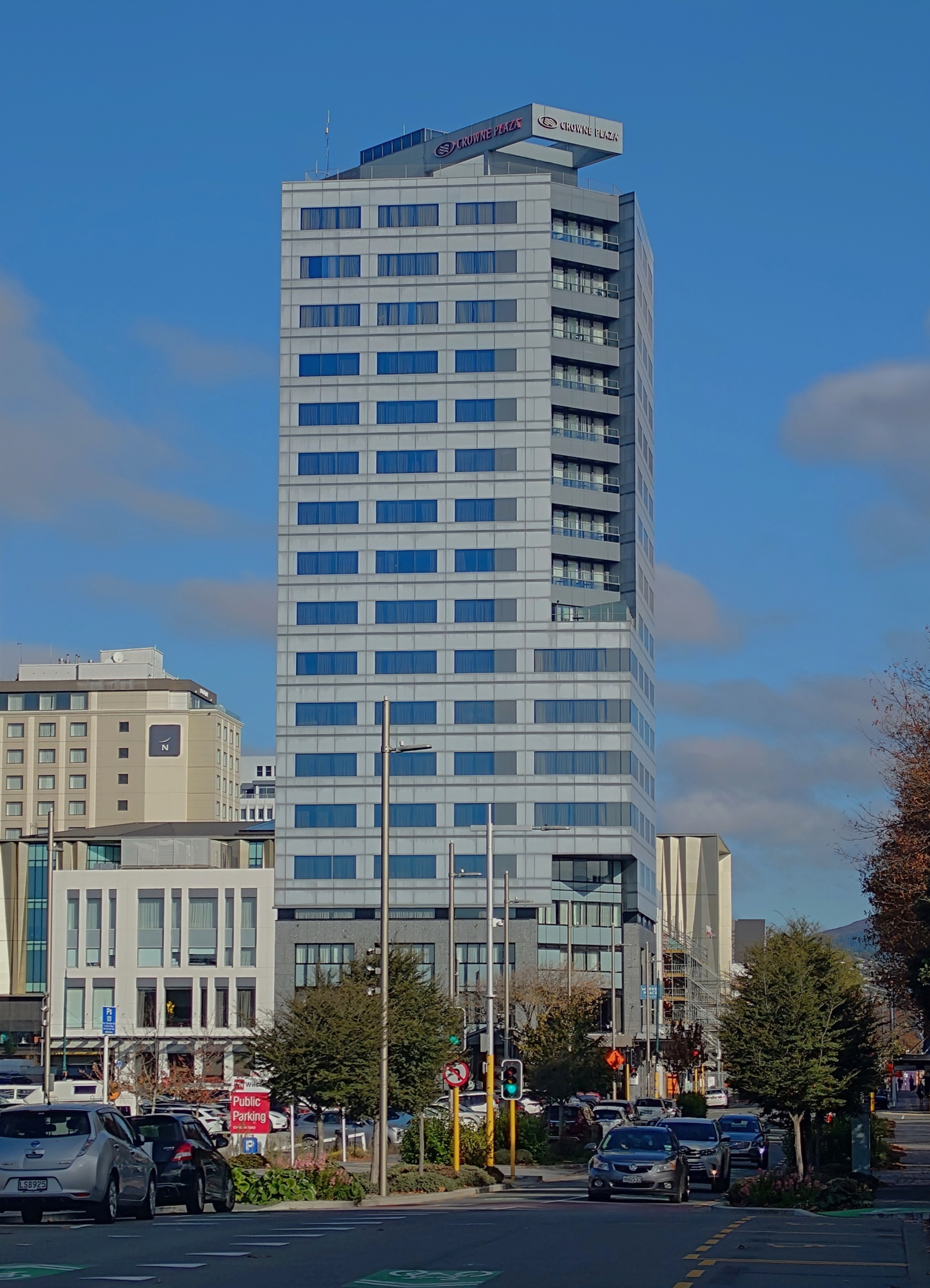
- Crowne Plaza Christchurch in April 2024

General information
- Status: Completed
- Type: Office high rise
- Location: Christchurch Central City, Corner of Armagh and Colombo Street, Christchurch, New Zealand
- Coordinates: 43°31′44″S 172°38′13″E
- Completed: 1989

Height
- Roof: 70 m (230 ft)

Technical details
- Floor count: 19 storeys

Design and construction
- Architect: Warren and Mahoney
- Developer: Paynter Developments
- Main contractor: Fletcher Construction

The Crowne Plaza Christchurch, formerly known as the Forsyth Barr Building, is located on the south-east corner of the Armagh and Colombo Streets intersection in Christchurch, New Zealand. Originally owned by Bob Jones and branded Robert Jones House by him, it was commonly referred to as Bob Jones Tower, but some called it Bob's Folly. In the 2011 Christchurch earthquake, its staircases collapsed, trapping the occupants. The building reopened in July 2017 as the city's Crowne Plaza hotel.

== History ==
The original building on the location was the Golden Fleece Hotel, built in 1851. The 1980s high-rise was a property speculation by Paynter Developments, who engaged Christchurch architecture firm Warren and Mahoney for the architectural design, and Holmes Consulting Group as structural engineers. Fletcher Construction was the contractor for the project. The building was finished in mid-1989 and sold to Robert Jones Investments (Canterbury), a company owned by Bob Jones. Jones, a property developer who had survived the 1987 stock market crash, named the building Robert Jones House and put the initials "RJI" of his investment company on the building. Jones had a high public profile, as he had set up the New Zealand Party just prior to the 1984 election to oppose Robert Muldoon, but the effect of this was that the conservative vote was split, and the Labour Party won the election, and David Lange formed the Fourth Labour Government. The building was commonly referred to as Bob Jones Tower, but some called it Bob's Folly in relation to his 1984 election interference. The building was later sold and named for New Zealand investment banking firm Forsyth Barr.

Built with 17 storeys, the structure was at the time Christchurch's second tallest building at 70 metres (230 ft), after the 1986 Hotel Grand Chancellor at 85 metres (279 ft). Two further high rises overtook the Forsyth Barr House over time, first the PricewaterhouseCoopers building in 1990 at 76.3 metres (250 ft), and then the Pacific Tower in 2010 at 86 metres (282 ft). It was an unusual design for Warren and Mahoney, who had until then worked with exposed concrete beams that showed the structure of buildings, but chose a glass curtain wall design with aluminium panels that hid the structure. This construction system became the norm for office buildings for the next two decades based on construction techniques pioneered in Christchurch. According to historian Geoffrey Rice, many architects regard this building as Warren and Mahoney's "ugly duckling", and Paul Walker, professor of architecture at the University of Melbourne, asks: "Does anyone love the monolithic Forsyth Barr building on Colombo Street...?"

In 2008, the Forsyth Barr Building was one of three A-grade office buildings in central Christchurch; the others were the PricewaterhouseCoopers Building, and the Clarendon Tower.

=== 2011 Christchurch earthquake ===
John Kirk-Anderson's photo of a person being abseiled from the Forsyth Barr Building became one of the enduring photos of the 2011 Christchurch earthquake.

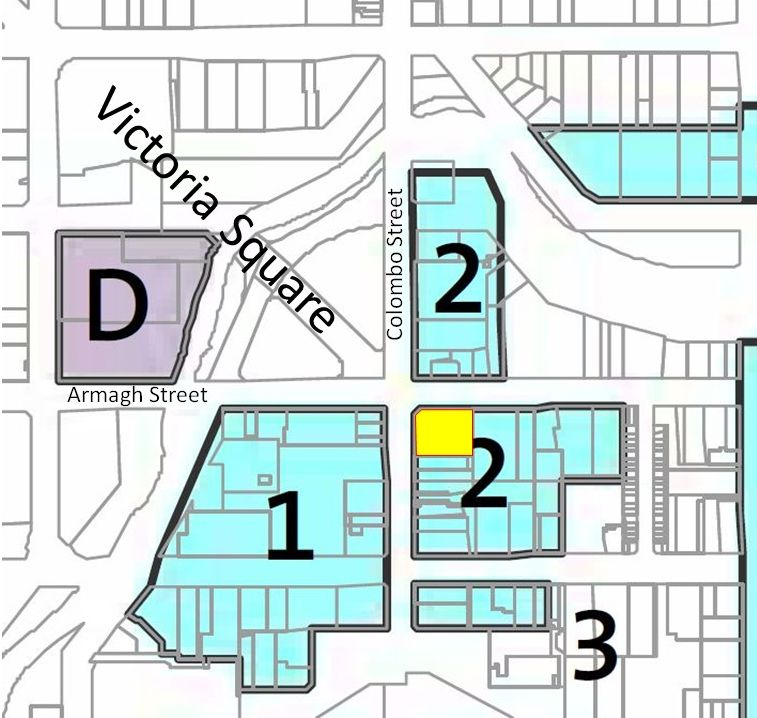
The building's land highlighted in yellow within the designation of the Performing Arts Precinct

After the September 11 attacks in 2001, emergency supplies for an evacuation of this high-rise were installed, including ropes, sledge hammers, and axes. In the 2011 Christchurch earthquake, several staircases in Forsyth Barr House collapsed, trapping the occupants. One of the trapped occupants, a trained mountain guide with experience in mountain rescue, had windows broken and abseiled people onto an adjacent car parking building. The photo of one of the occupants being abseiled along the glass façade, taken by The Press photographer John Kirk-Anderson, is one of the enduring images of that earthquake. Search of the building was technically difficult for urban search and rescue (USAR) teams, requiring the deconstruction of 4-tonne stair sets, but the building was cleared with no victims discovered.

The Hotel Grand Chancellor and PricewaterhouseCoopers were both demolished subsequent to the earthquake, hence the Forsyth Barr Building is once more Christchurch's second-tallest building. Until mid-2013, it was unclear whether the Forsyth Barr Building would also be demolished, or whether it was economically feasible to repair it.

Subsequent to the earthquakes, the Canterbury Earthquake Recovery Authority (CERA) developed a Christchurch Central Recovery Plan. Almost two city blocks were designated for the Performing Arts Precinct, including the land that the Forsyth Barr Building was located on. This meant that The Crown could have compulsorily acquired the land from its owners if it wanted to go ahead with the Performing Arts Precinct. The designation was later lifted and the size of the Performing Arts Precinct designation reduced after Christchurch City Council had decided to restore the existing Christchurch Town Hall instead of building a new one within this precinct.

== Conversion to hotel ==
The earthquake-damaged building was sold in an "as is, where is" state for NZ$8 million. In December 2014, it was revealed that the building will be leased to the Crowne Plaza chain for a hotel, replacing the former Crowne Plaza hotel that stood diagonally opposite across Victoria Square prior to the earthquakes. In late 2015, new staircases were installed. The new hotel opened on 1 July 2017, offering 204 rooms.

== See also ==
- List of tallest buildings in Christchurch

== Sources ==
- Rice, Geoffrey (2014). Victoria Square: Cradle of Christchurch. Christchurch: Canterbury University Press. ISBN 978-1927145586.
- Christchurch Central Recovery Plan. Christchurch: Canterbury Earthquake Recovery Authority. 30 July 2012. ISBN 978-0-478-39718-5.
- Amendments to Christchurch City Council's District Plan. Christchurch: Canterbury Earthquake Recovery Authority. July 2012. ISBN 978-0-478-39712-3.
