= Victoria Street, Christchurch =

Street in Christchurch, New Zealand

Victoria Street
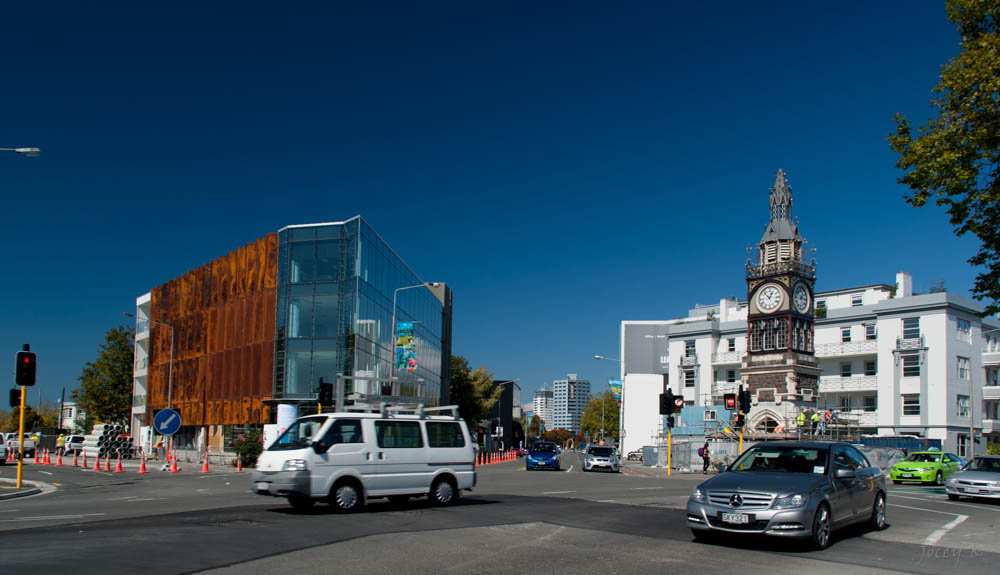
- View south-east along Victoria Street from Salisbury Street, with the Victoria Clock Tower in the foreground
- Former name(s): Whately Road
- Length: 800 m (2,600 ft)
- North end: Bealey Avenue & Papanui Road
- South end: Durham & Kilmore Streets

Victoria Street is a road in the central city of Christchurch, New Zealand. It runs from the intersection of Papanui Road and Bealey Avenue in the north-west, and terminates in the south-east at the corner of Kilmore and Durham Streets. One of the two diagonal roads that break the original grid plan (the other being High Street), it was very important in the development of Christchurch.

== Geography ==
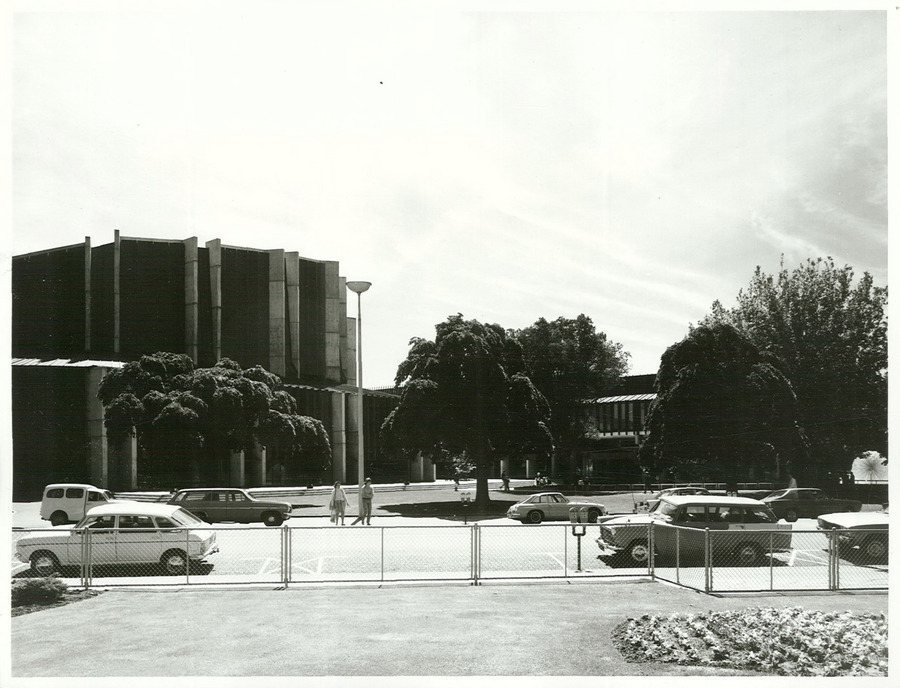
Victoria Street at the Town Hall in 1973; this section of the street has since been closed

Victoria St runs for roughly 800 metres (0.50 mi) from north-west to south-east towards the centre of Christchurch. It stops at Kilmore and Durham Streets, which form the boundary of Victoria Square. There is a slight deviation in direction at the intersection of Salisbury and Montreal Streets. Originally, the street began at the intersection of Colombo and Armagh Streets and went through what is now Victoria Square, including a crossing of the Avon River on what is now known as the Hamish Hay Bridge.

== History ==
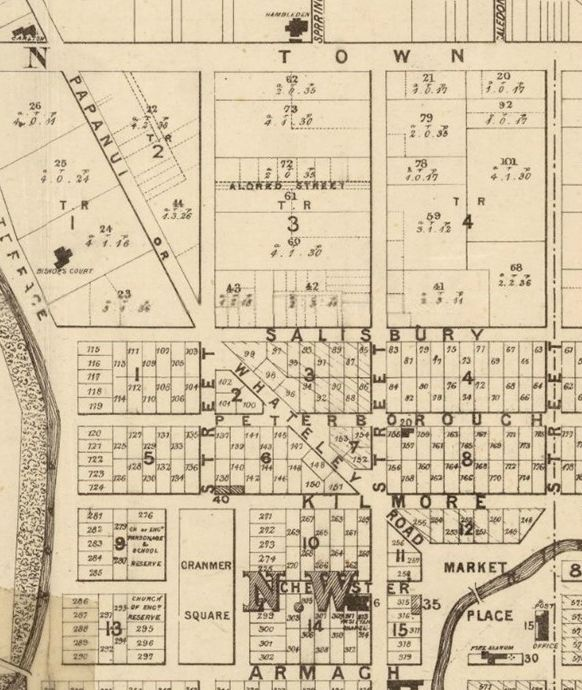
1875 map showing Victoria Street with contemporary street names

Victoria Square is one of four squares located in the Christchurch Central City. It is located just north-west from its centre, Cathedral Square. The square was initially bisected by Whately Road (named after the Archbishop of Dublin, Richard Whately, who was a member of the Canterbury Association), later renamed Victoria Street, and this formed a major route to the north towards Papanui and beyond. Victoria Street was stopped in 1988 at Kilmore and Durham Streets under much public protest when the Parkroyal Hotel, the later Crowne Plaza, was built. When the Crowne Plaza was demolished in 2011/12 following the earthquakes, some were calling for the road to be restored; this included central city business leader Paul Lonsdale. This caused quite a storm of opposition, and soon after, the idea of restoring the road was dropped.
