= Crowne Plaza, Christchurch =

Crowne Plaza (former)
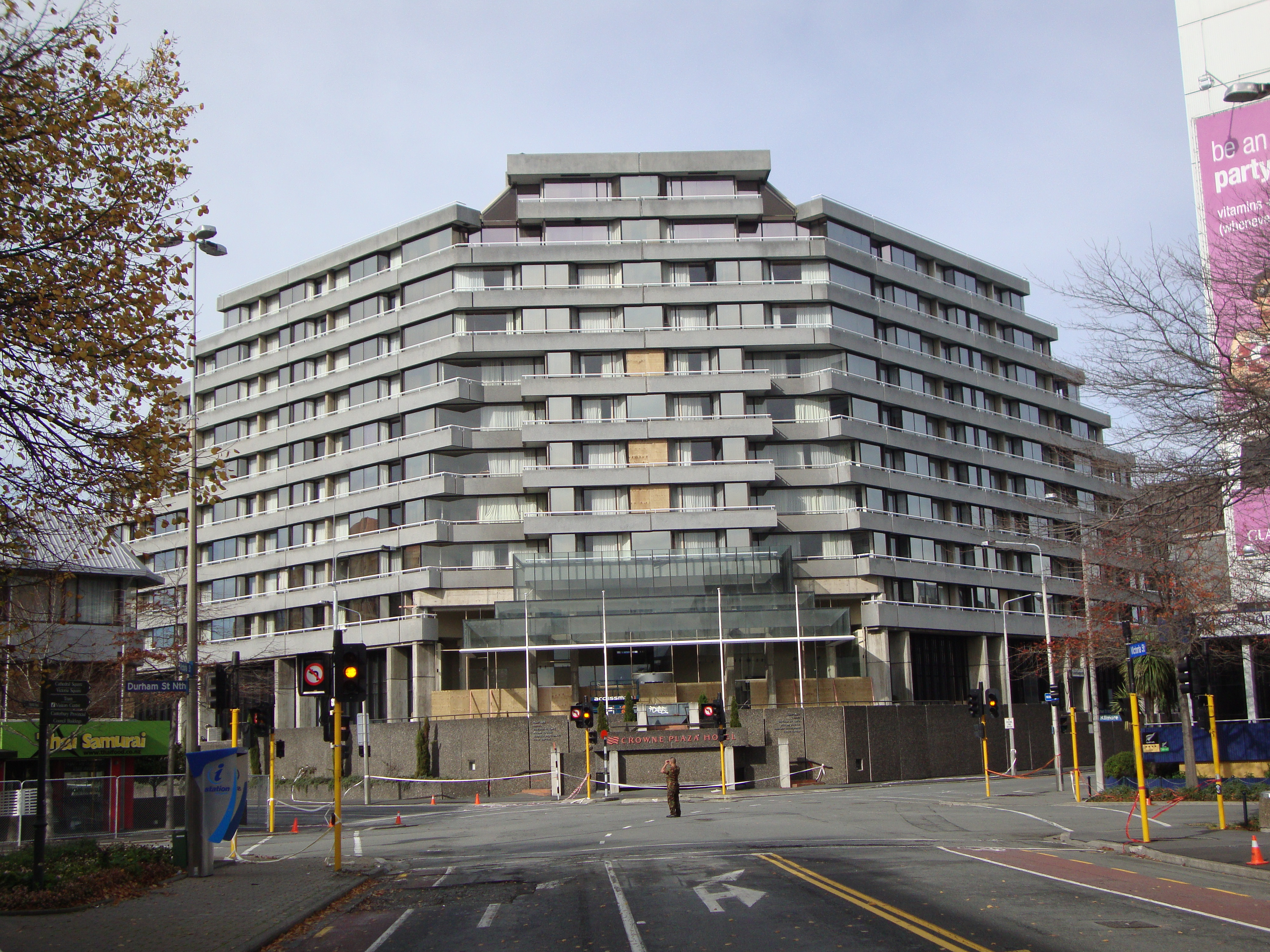
- Crowne Plaza as seen from Victoria Street in May 2011
- Interactive map of the Crowne Plaza (former) area

General information
- Type: Hotel
- Location: Christchurch Central City, corner Kilmore and Durham Streets, Christchurch, New Zealand
- Coordinates: 43°31′37″S 172°38′02″E
- Completed: 1989
- Demolished: 2012

Height
- Roof: 45 m (148 ft)

Technical details
- Floor count: 12 storeys

Design and construction
- Architect: Warren and Mahoney
- Developer: Southern Pacific Hotels Corporation (SPHC)

The Crowne Plaza in Christchurch, New Zealand, originally known as the Parkroyal Hotel, was a hotel of the Crowne Plaza group. Built in 1988 in the north-west corner of Victoria Square after much public protest, as it cut off the first part of Victoria Street, its construction happened at the same time and enabled the substantial redesign of Victoria Square. The building had New Zealand's largest atrium, and was one of the city's largest hotels. The building suffered significant damage in the 2011 Christchurch earthquake and was demolished in April 2012. The Crowne Plaza group has secured a lease in the Forsyth Barr Building at the opposite end of Victoria Square.

== History ==
British town planner Gordon Stephenson was commissioned to find an appropriate location for major civic assets in the Christchurch Central City; the city had never had a municipally owned town hall, and it was in need of new civic offices, with the Civic running out of room. His 1962 report recommended the northern part of Victoria Square for the Christchurch Town Hall, and the north-western corner for the new civic offices. This required the closure of the south-eastern section of Victoria Street that ran through Victoria Square, something that was confirmed in Christchurch City Council's 1965 planning document Traffic in a New Zealand City from 1965. The Town Hall opened in 1972.

Under the mayor Ron Guthrey's leadership, Christchurch's elected members had signed off on the new civic offices in March 1970, and Christchurch architecture firm Warren and Mahoney was undertaking the design. The Christchurch City (Reserves) Empowering Act 1971 was passed by Parliament, and that provided an important legal basis for the closure of Victoria Street. Another step, taken much later in 1985, was the process of removing the underlying legal road status from that part of Victoria Street located between the river and Kilmore Street; the remainder had never been designated legal road, but had always been a reserve. Guthrey's mayoralty came to an end in 1972 over the proposed new road through Hagley Park in accordance with the 1965 traffic report, and his successor, Neville Pickering, cancelled the civic offices project and had Miller's Department Store building in Tuam Street purchased instead for new offices.

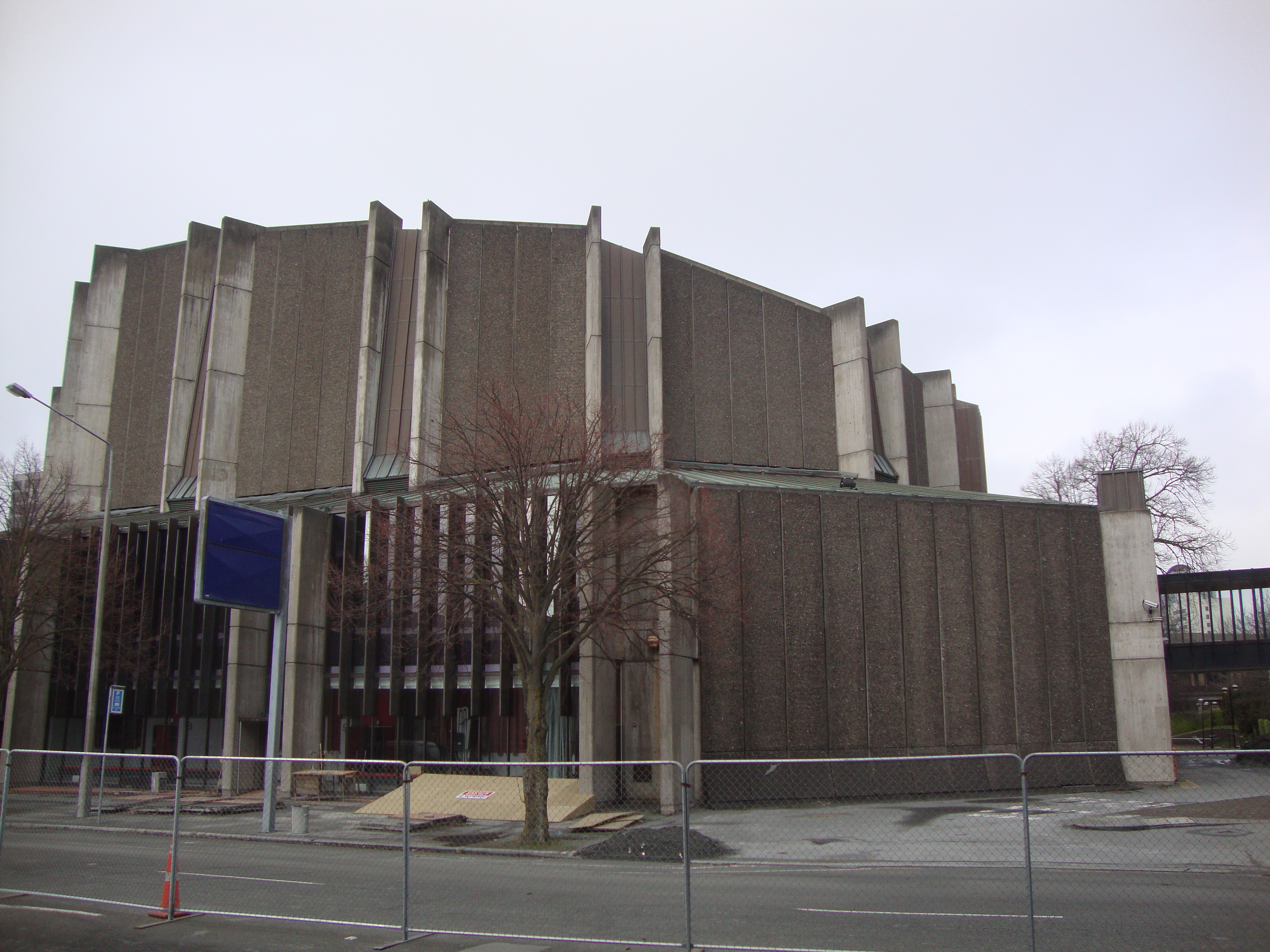
Christchurch Town Hall, with the pedestrian bridge connecting it to the adjacent hotel visible on the right

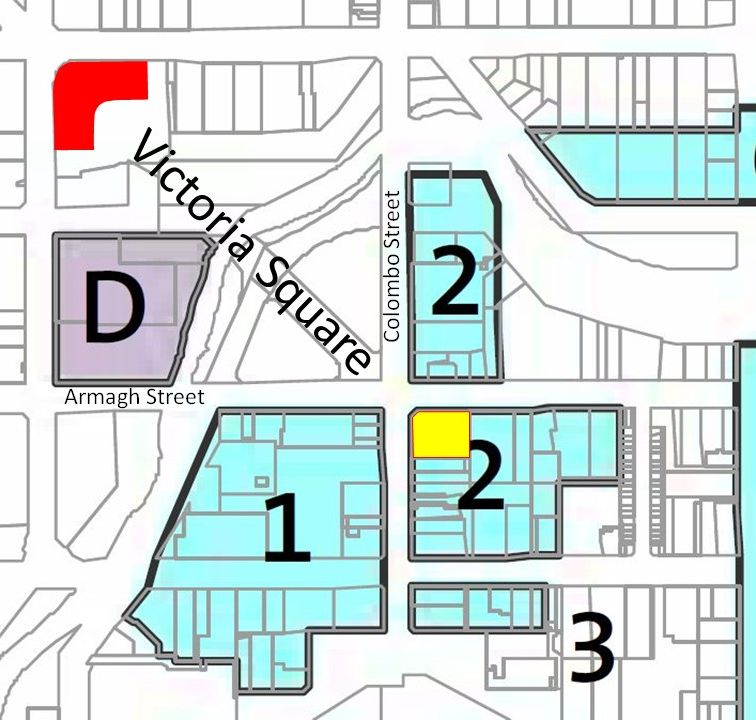
Map showing the previous Crowne Plaza location (red) and the current location (yellow)

Christchurch City Council convened a working party in 1983 and that group recommended for Victoria Street to be removed, and a tourist hotel be built in the north-west corner of Victoria Square. Whilst there was extensive public consultation on the proposed changes to the layout of Victoria Square, the public was not consulted about the hotel proposal. The city's architect suggested that an L-shaped building be appropriate for the corner site. An architectural competition was called for that received much attention from domestic and overseas firms. Five proposals were short-listed and more detailed plans invited. Those plans were provided by Air New Zealand, DFC New Zealand Limited, Sheraton Hotels, developers Paynter & Hamilton (brothers-in-law Albert Paynter and Hugh Hamilton), and Southern Pacific Hotels Corporation (SPHC). The latter, the Australian-based parent company of Travelodge, had engaged Warren and Mahoney as their architect, and their proposal was chosen in September 1984. Part of the proposal was to use the hotel as a convention centre in conjunction with the adjacent town hall, and to connect the two buildings via a pedestrian bridge at first floor level.

While the Parkroyal was under construction, the changes to Victoria Square were constructed, based on the 1983 concept plan that was adhered to in all its main features. The landscape architects had chosen a plan with contoured earth mounds, and a meandering path towards the Avon River bridge; an earlier idea was to keep the symmetry of Victoria Square with a future pathway, in place of the road, going straight to the civic offices. But with a private building established there instead, the 1983 concept plan showed a meandering path that was seen as more appropriate. A large amphitheatre between the bridge and the hotel was allowed for. The Parkroyal was formally opened in early October 1988, and this was followed two weeks later, on 16 October, by the opening of stage I of the Victoria Square redevelopment. Stage II of Victoria Square was formally opened on 8 October 1989, with poor weather forcing the ceremony and speeches to move into the adjacent town hall.

Following damage from the 2011 Christchurch earthquake, the hotel was demolished by April–May 2012. The Crowne Plaza group secured a lease in the Forsyth Barr Building at the opposite end of Victoria Square where it reopened in late 2017.
