= Victoria Square, Christchurch =

Public place in Christchurch, New Zealand

Victoria Square
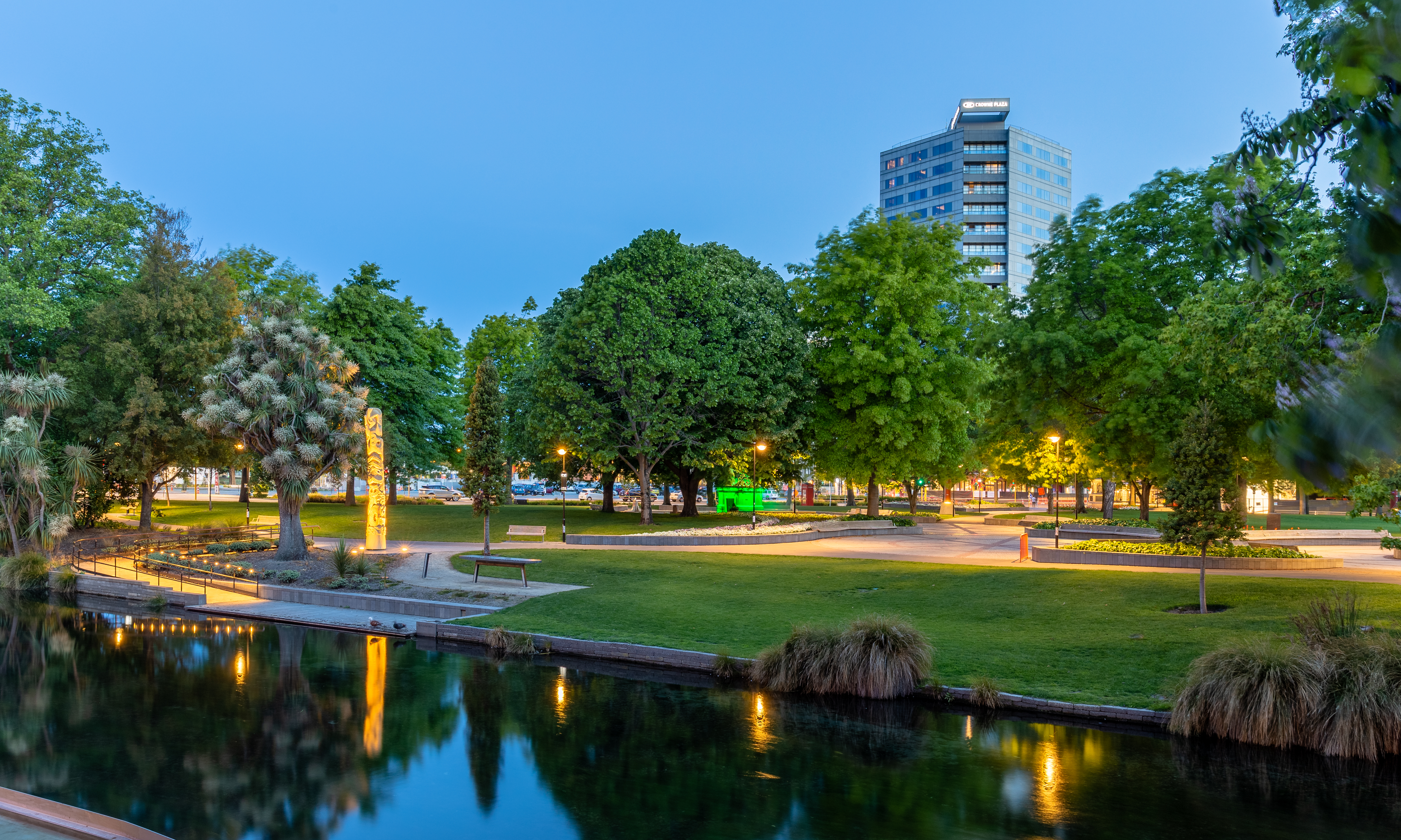
- Victoria Square in 2020
- Interactive map of Victoria Square
- Type: Public square
- Location: Christchurch Central, Christchurch, New Zealand
- Coordinates: 43°31′40″S 172°38′7″E
- Created: 1896
- Operator: Christchurch City Council

Victoria Square is a public park located in central Christchurch, New Zealand. Originally known by European settlers as Market Place or Market Square, it was renamed to Victoria Square in 1903 in honour of Queen Victoria. It was one of the four squares included in the original plan of Christchurch when the city was laid out in 1850.

Prior to European colonisation, a small Māori settlement was located here, on the bank of the Avon River / Ōtākaro (where the Christchurch Supreme Court was later built). The square was a centre of civic life in early Christchurch. It was the site of market days, fairs, and trade before its redevelopment in 1896–1897 into a park. It continued to be a venue for political and religious speeches until after World War II. The square was also the usual place for both military and civilian parades, and a key location for most royal visits to the city.

For most of its history Victoria Street ran diagonally through the square, carrying trams and cars northwards out of the Central City. The square underwent major changes during the last part of the 20th century, with the construction of the Christchurch Town Hall on the northern side in the 1970s. Victoria Street was closed at Kilmore Street in the 1980s to enable the square to be transformed into a major urban green space. Following the February 2011 earthquake, Victoria Square was closed to the public as part of Central City Red Zone. After initial repairs, it was re-opened in November 2012 and full restoration was completed in 2018. Today the square hosts a number of notable landmarks including the Captain James Cook statue, Queen Victoria statue, H. L. Bowker Fountain, and a Ngāi Tahu pouwhenua. It also features the country's oldest cast iron and stone bridge, now known as the Hamish Hay Bridge. Te Pae Christchurch Convention Centre faces into the square on its southern side. The square is part of the precinct of greenspaces through the central city on the banks of the Avon River / Ōtākaro.

== Geography ==
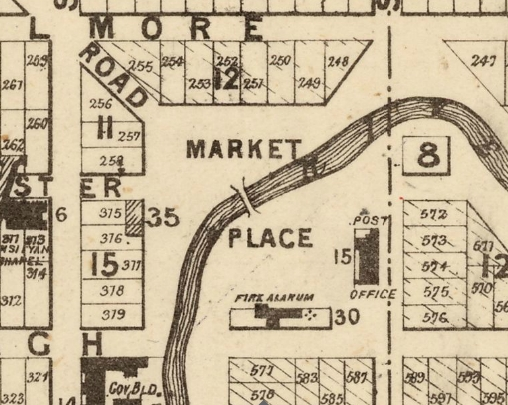
A map of Market Place from 1875

Christchurch was originally planned with a grid layout around a central square, along with three smaller public squares nearby. Victoria Square is one of these four original squares, the others being Cranmer Square, Cathedral Square and Latimer Square. Colombo Street forms the eastern boundary of Victoria Square and runs directly south to Cathedral Square, which is only one block away. Armagh Street bounds the square on the southern side. The Avon River bisects the square from south-west to north-east. In the early days, Oxford and Cambridge Terraces ran alongside the river, but those streets have now been pedestrianised and only continue through the square as footpaths.

The square was initially bisected north-west to south-east by Whately Road (named after the Archbishop of Dublin, Richard Whately, who was a member of the Canterbury Association). It was later renamed to Victoria Street, and this formed a major route to the north towards Papanui and beyond. Other boundary streets are Kilmore and Durham Streets on the northern and western boundaries, respectively. Victoria Street was stopped from running through the square in 1988 when the Parkroyal Hotel (later the Crowne Plaza) was built.

Depending on context, Victoria Square can refer to either the entire area bounded by the four surrounding roads, or just the public park in that area. This would exclude the Town Hall in the north-east and the former Christchurch Law Court complex in the south-west.

== History ==
=== Market Place era ===
The area where Victoria Square was established was originally swamp land on the banks of the Avon River / Ōtākaro. This area was part of an important mahinga kai (food-gathering place) and kāinga nohoanga (settlement area) for early Māori. The swampy ground made the area difficult for long-term settlement but extremely valuable as a food resource, with seasonal settlements established for collecting food. The area was settled by Waitaha as early as 1300, with Ngāi Tahu later occupying the area. The name most often used for this area is Puāri, though this name is probably fairly modern. Indeed in 1850 Puāri was the name of a small Māori settlement on the bank of the Avon River (where the Christchurch Supreme Court was later built), which was likely to better facilitate trade with the European settlers at the nearby Market Place.

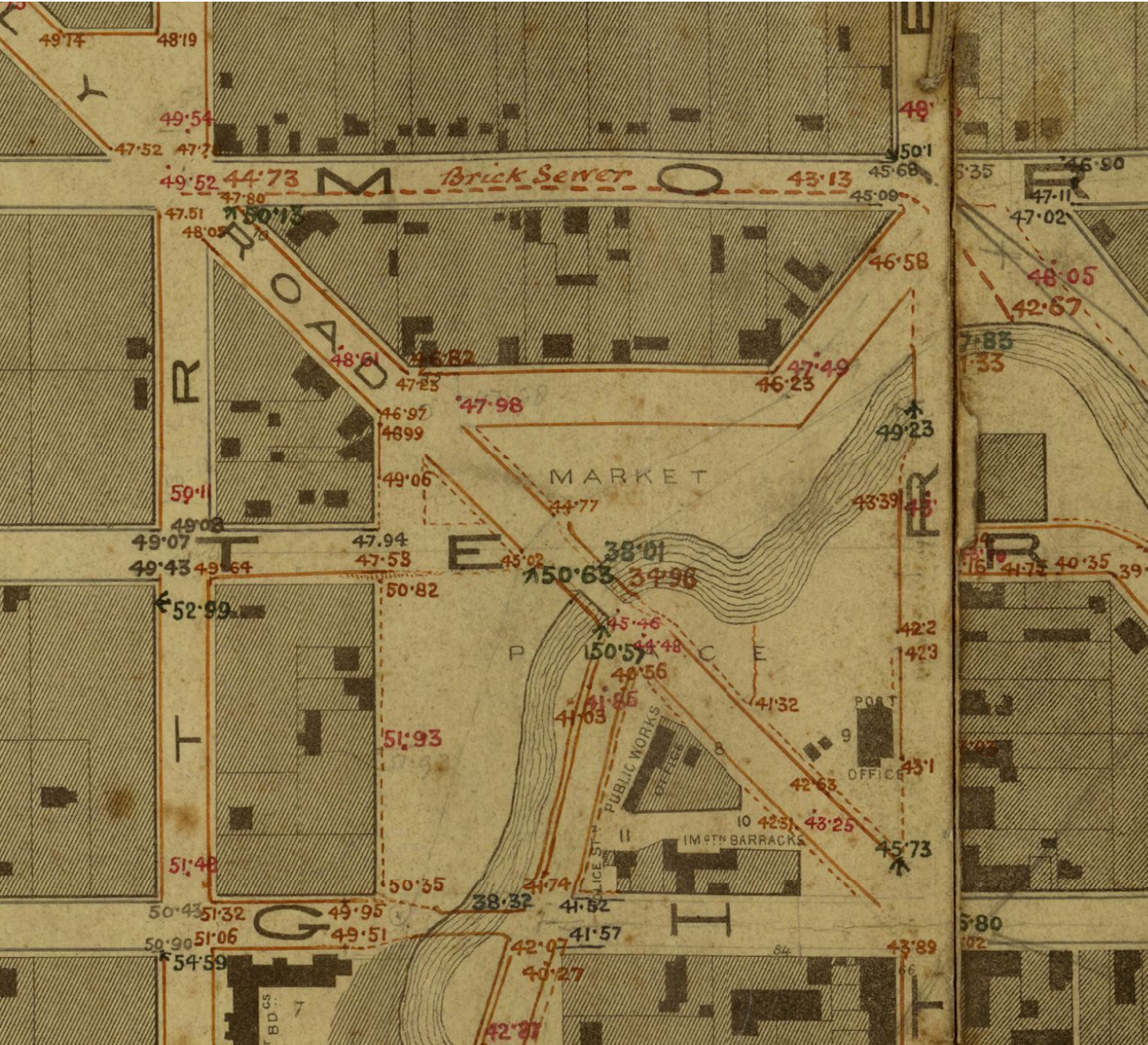
Detail of Market Place on the map of Christchurch in 1862 by C. E. Fooks.

Christchurch was surveyed by Joseph Thomas and Edward Jollie in March 1850, and on these earliest maps the area that became Victoria Square is marked as grassland. On Black Map 273 the area straddling the river can already be seen marked as "Market Place". The third wooden building in Christchurch — a general store owned by Charles Wellington Bishop — was built on the Colombo Street side of the square in early 1851. Market Place was also the location of an important gravel quarry, that provided much of the shingle used for metalling the major gravel roads in early Christchurch, both north to Papanui and east to Sumner. A plaque on Armagh Street marks the location of this early quarry.

Market Place was the de facto centre of early Christchurch, being the major centre of trade for both European settlers and Māori in the new city. By March 1852 Market Place was home to the city's first post office, three general stores, a hotel and stable, a butchery, a carpenter, a tinsmith and a gunsmith. George Gould, the father of the prominent businessman and long-time director of The Press of the same name, had his general store on Colombo Street facing Market Square. The first simple bridge over the Avon River in the square was built in March 1852; it was variably known as Papanui Bridge and Market Place Bridge. During an 1852 visit to Christchurch of the Governor, George Grey, it was agreed that the government would pay for a police station and lock-up. In June of that year Isaac Luck built the structure, measuring only 10 by 20 feet (3.0 m × 6.1 m), on the corner of Armagh Street and Cambridge Terrace. What was long talked about afterwards was that upon completion, Luck held a ball in it for his friends.

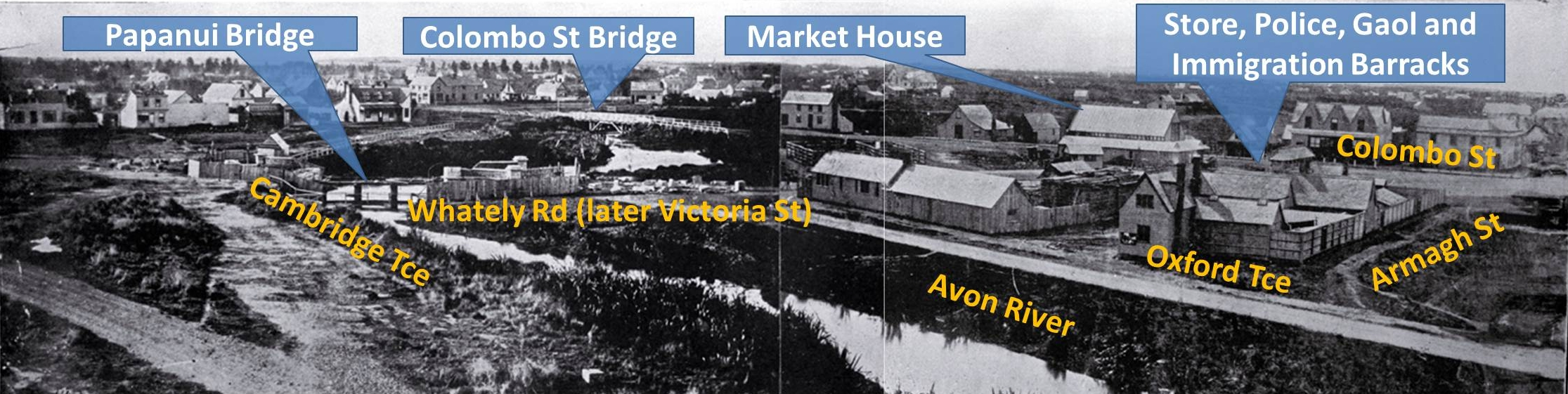
Market Place in 1864 during the construction of the Papanui Bridge

In 1858 a new police and immigration barracks were constructed by George Cliff, close to the existing lock-up. A simple wooden bridge over the Avon River was constructed on Colombo Street in 1859, and the Market Hall was built by the provincial council on the north side of the square. By 1862 the original wooden bridge in the centre of the square was in need of replacement due to heavy use. The provincial council chose to build a permanent bridge of stone and cast-iron. The metal girders and railings were ordered from England, and arrived in July 1864. Three of the girders had cracked in transit and needed to be repaired by local blacksmith John Anderson, who bolted plates across the cracks. These repairs are still visible on the exposed central part of the bridge today. The bridge was officially named the Victoria Bridge and opened on 28 September 1864 by councillors John Ollivier and Dr William Donald, who together smashed a bottle of wine against the decking to mark the occasion.

During the great storm of 1868 the square was completely flooded when the Avon River overtopped its banks. Water filled the square to the Armagh-Colombo corner and flooded many of the surrounding houses. Whately Road had to be rebuilt on both sides of Victoria Bridge due to damage to the road surface, and the banks of the river were largely eroded. Luckily damage to the surrounding buildings was mostly superficial.

In 1868, Pita Te Hori — the first upoko runanga (tribal leader) of Ngāi Tuahuriri, a hapū of Ngāi Tahu — made a claim to the Native Land Court that the area of Victoria Square belonged to them, as the original Canterbury Purchase deed had specified that mahinga kai locations should be kept by the iwi. Though Puāri was a mahinga kai, it did not have any fixed structures or permanent cultivation, and so became excluded from iwi ownership by the narrow interpretation of the colonists. Ultimately the court ruled against the iwi, deciding that the land had already been alienated from Māori and now belonged to The Crown.

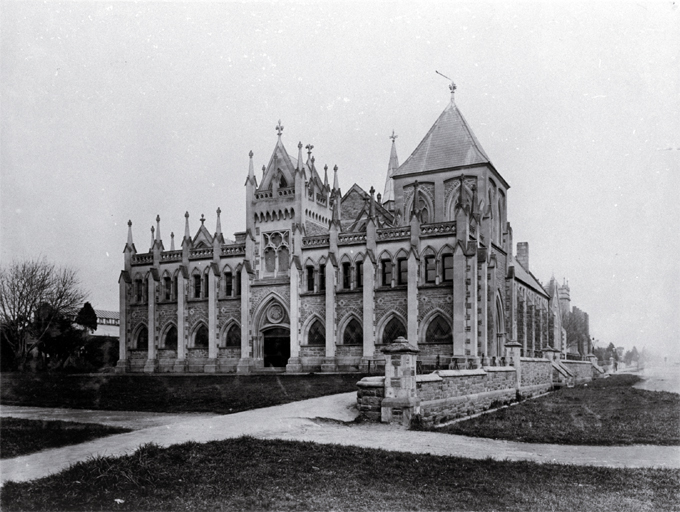
The Christchurch Supreme Court building stood on the western side of the square from 1870. It was demolished in the 1980s.

Construction of the Christchurch Supreme Court began on the western-side of the square in January 1869, with the first cases heard there in 1870. Designed by Alexander Lean, the stone building was made in the Gothic revival style, like many early buildings in early Christchurch. It was later followed by the Magistrates' Court building in 1880, just to the south on Armagh Street. This smaller building was designed by Benjamin Mountfort, and is a heritage-listed building.

James Irving, a physician and surgeon whose property fronted onto Market Place, first proposed in 1894 that the area be renamed to Victoria Square as it was no longer used as a market. During 1896 and 1897 the square was landscaped to make it more of an urban park. With Queen Victoria's diamond jubilee in 1897, a petition was made to the city council with 71 signatures to rename Market Place. Despite the strong support the proposal languished as the council believed the square could not be renamed without an act of parliament. Patriotism was heightened during the Second Boer War, and with the 50th jubilee of Christchurch in 1900 it was decided a statue of Queen Victoria would be erected in Market Place. The statue was ordered from England, but Queen Victoria died just twelve days later. This caused high demand for similar statues, which resulted in the statue being delayed until 1903. The Queen's grandson and Duke of Cornwall and York, Prince George (later King George V) placed the foundation stone at a ceremony during his visit to Christchurch in 1901. Market Place was renamed to Victoria Square on 25 May 1903 alongside the official unveiling of the statue.

=== 20th century ===
During the early part of the 20th century Victoria Square continued to be a centre of civic life. The band rotunda was a popular venue for military parades, music performances, religious meetings and political speeches. In 1905 the first electric trams began to run on the No. 1 Papanui line through Victoria Square, across the Victoria Bridge.

During the first few years of the 1930s the Great Depression made Victoria Square into the scene of violent clashes between Police, striking workers and the unemployed. The cities' unions – in particular the New Zealand Tramways Union and the Unemployed Association – egged on by radicals such as Sidney Fournier and members of the Communist Party of New Zealand, attempted to block the trams from operating. When police broke up the protests in Cathedral Square, the angry crowds recongregated in Victoria Square.

In 1931 the Bowker Fountain was installed, which was notable as the first electrically illuminated fountain in the Southern Hemisphere. It was followed in 1932 by the Statue of James Cook. After a crowd of 60,000 people attended a fundraising event for soldiers wounded in World War II in 1940, the trampled flowerbeds led the city council to decide that Victoria Square would be maintained as a city park and garden, and would no longer be a place for large public meetings.

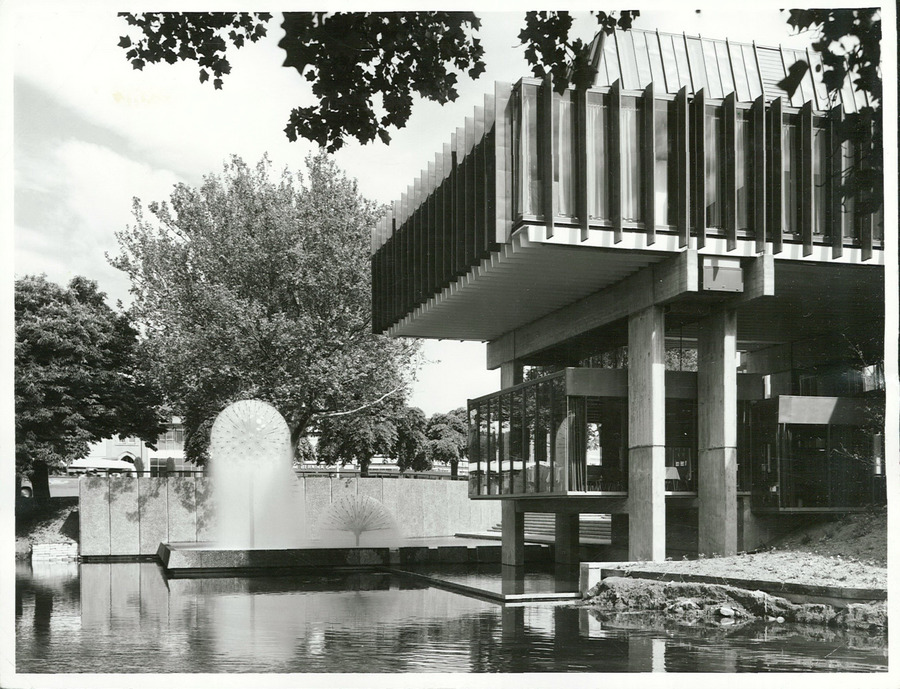
The Christchurch Town Hall was opened in 1972.

In 1955 the northern part of Victoria Square between Kilmore Street and the Avon River was one of the sites suggested for the construction of a town hall. Victoria Square had been the preferred location for a second town hall as far back as 1879, though the planned building never eventuated. In 1962 a town planner, Professor Gordon Stephenson, was invited to visit Christchurch. He proposed closing Victoria Street at the corner of Kilmore and Durham Streets, and to build a civic office and town hall along the northern side of the square. The planned civic offices were for the Christchurch City Council as it had outgrown its existing premises. The Christchurch Town Hall was designed by Sir Miles Warren and Maurice Mahoney of Warren and Mahoney Architects as part of an architectural competition in 1966. It was built north of the Avon River along the Kilmore Street frontage and opened in 1972 by the Governor-General Denis Blundell. The civic offices were not built; the city council instead purchased Miller's Department Store in Tuam Street and moved there in 1980; this proved to be much cheaper than building new premises. Victoria Square was finally closed to road traffic in 1986 in preparation for the square's redevelopment.

In the late 1960s the Ministry of Justice decided a new dedicated building was needed to house the Christchurch court. The administrative and library block began construction in 1975, and was positioned to somewhat intrude onto the riverbank lawns in Victoria Square. Delays in the construction meant the building was not completed until the 1980s. In 1981 the Supreme Court was completely demolished to make way for the new building, despite the protests of heritage groups. Construction of the new Christchurch Law Court building began in May 1986 and was completed in 1989. It was built by C. Lund and Company of Timaru for NZ$18,000,000, and was opened by the then Minister of Justice, Geoffrey Palmer.

The proposed Tourist Tower would have dwarfed other tall buildings in Christchurch.

In November 1986, a consortium of local developers known as Tourist Towers Limited proposed a 167 metres (548 ft) tall tower topped by a viewing platform and revolving restaurant. The structure would have been the South Island's tallest and was to be located within the footprint of Victoria St, in the south-east corner roughly where the Queen Victoria statue is today. Local businessman Jamie Tulloch was the public face of the project and the architects for the scheme were once again Warren and Mahoney. Controversial from the start and attracting strong opposition, in April 1988 a commissioners’ report recommended Christchurch City Council oppose the zoning changes required for the project to take place and the project was cancelled.

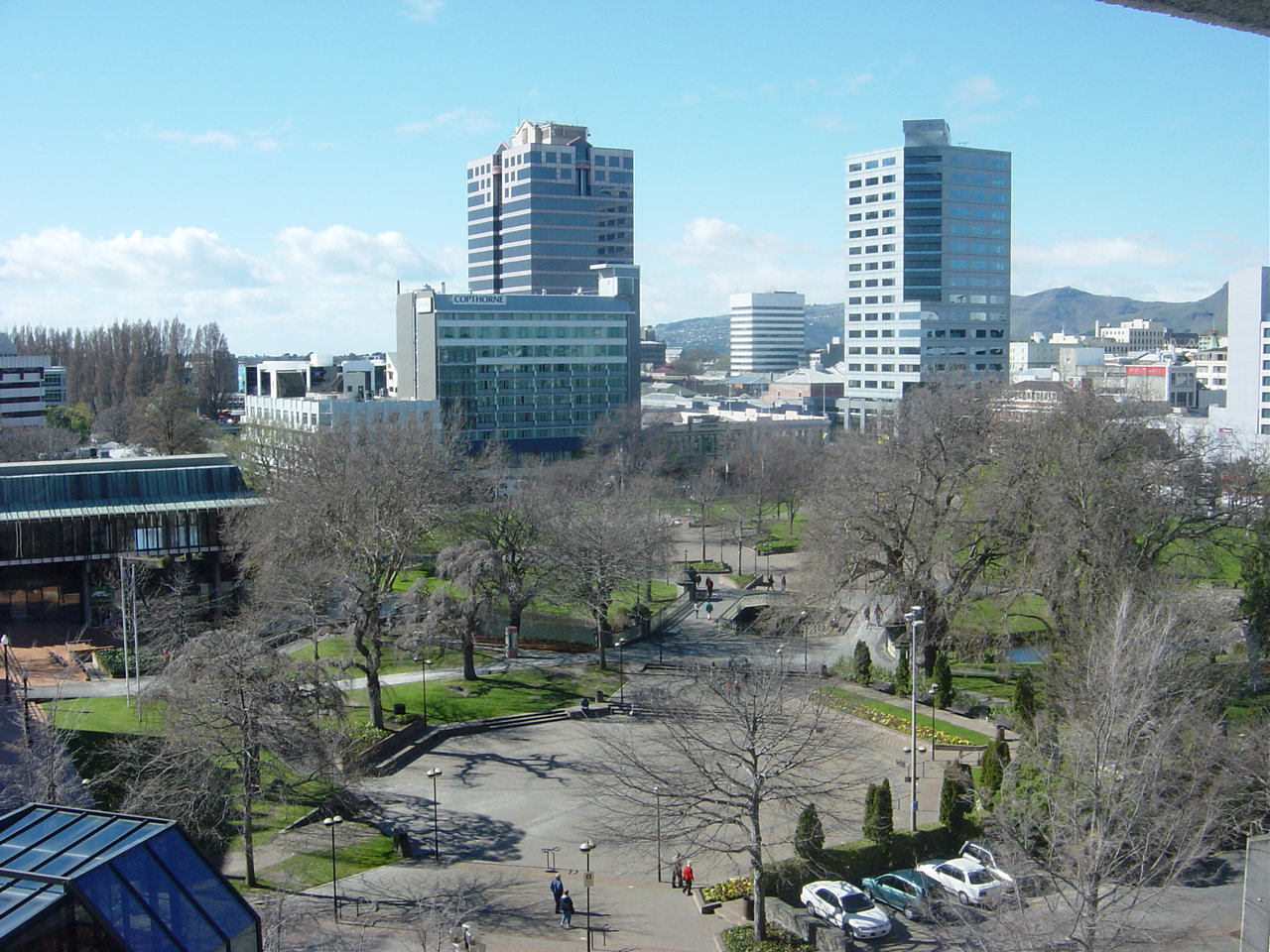
View of Victoria Square from the Crowne Plaza (formerly Parkroyal) Hotel in 2004. The Hamish Hay Bridge is in the centre of the image, with the Copthorne Hotel, PricewaterhouseCoopers, Radio Network House, and the Forsyth Barr Building beyond.

When the civic office project was abandoned the north-west corner of the square was instead leased to a developer, who built a large hotel on the site in 1988. The Parkroyal Hotel was also designed by Warren and Mahoney, and it became one of the finer addresses in Christchurch for accommodation. Majority-owned by Japanese real estate company Daikyo, the hotel was L-shaped, following the two road frontages. On the inside of the corner, a large atrium was formed facing Victoria Square; at the time, it was the largest atrium that had been built in the country. The name changed to Crowne Plaza after a rebranding by the Bass Hotels and Resorts group in 2001.

The closure of the road and construction of the Park Royal hotel prompted an opportunity for a complete redesign of the square in 1988. The work was divided into two stages: stage I would remodel the area north of the river, with the area south of the river later remodeled as part of stage II. The statues of Queen Victoria and James Cook were moved, and large circular paved areas were built, including a large amphitheatre north-west of the Avon. The riverbanks were landscaped and new trees were also planted. During the opening ceremony, outgoing Mayor of Christchurch Hamish Hay described the redesigned square as "one of the most magnificent passive recreation areas in New Zealand". The Victoria Bridge was renamed to the Hamish Hay Bridge in his honour.

=== Post-earthquake ===
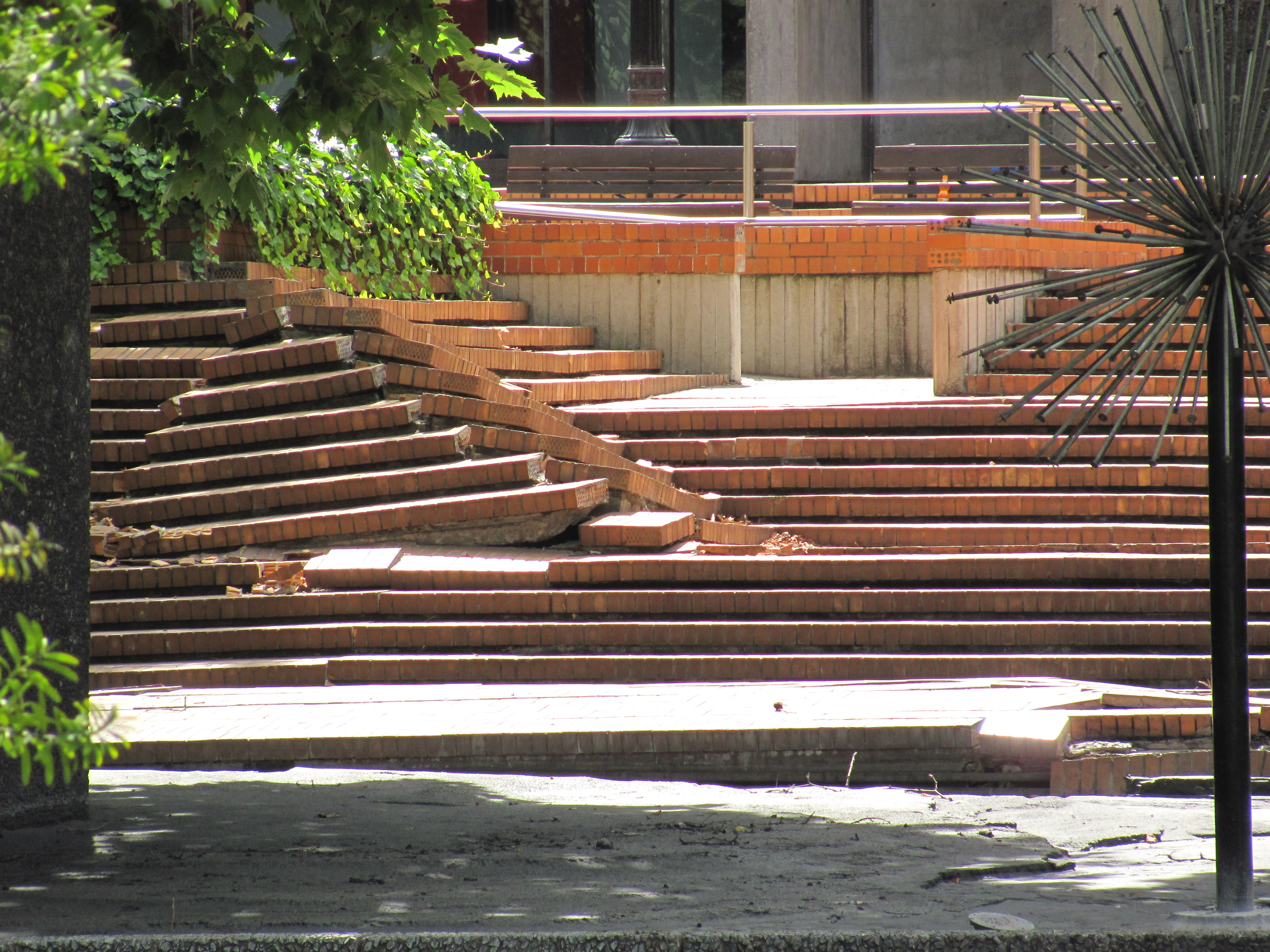
Earthquake damage to the square included cracking and displacement of paved areas, seen here in the brickwork terraces around the Town Hall.

The 2011 Christchurch earthquake caused some damage to the square, and it was cordoned off from public access as part of the Central City Red Zone. Damage was mostly the result of the ground settling around the riverbanks, and soil liquefaction. The statues of Queen Victoria and James Cook remained upright, with the Bowker Fountain tilted on an angle. Footpaths and paved areas suffered extensive cracking and deformation, creating trip hazards. The square began to be reopened to the public in 2012 in a partially restored state.

In August 2011, Central City Business Association chair Paul Lonsdale suggested that Victoria Street could be re-established through the square when the Crowne Plaza hotel was demolished. The idea was criticised in part because the Hamish Hay Bridge would require expensive structural work to carry car traffic, and re-establishing the road would destroy a key green space in the central city.

The Crowne Plaza hotel was demolished in early 2012. Later that year the now-empty site was used by the urban regeneration initiative Gap Filler for their Pallet Pavilion, an outdoor venue built by volunteer labour from wooden pallets. Originally envisaged to be there for just the summer of 2012/13, the venue proved so popular that crowdfunding raised $80,000 for nighttime security, maintenance and a venue manager over the 2013 winter.

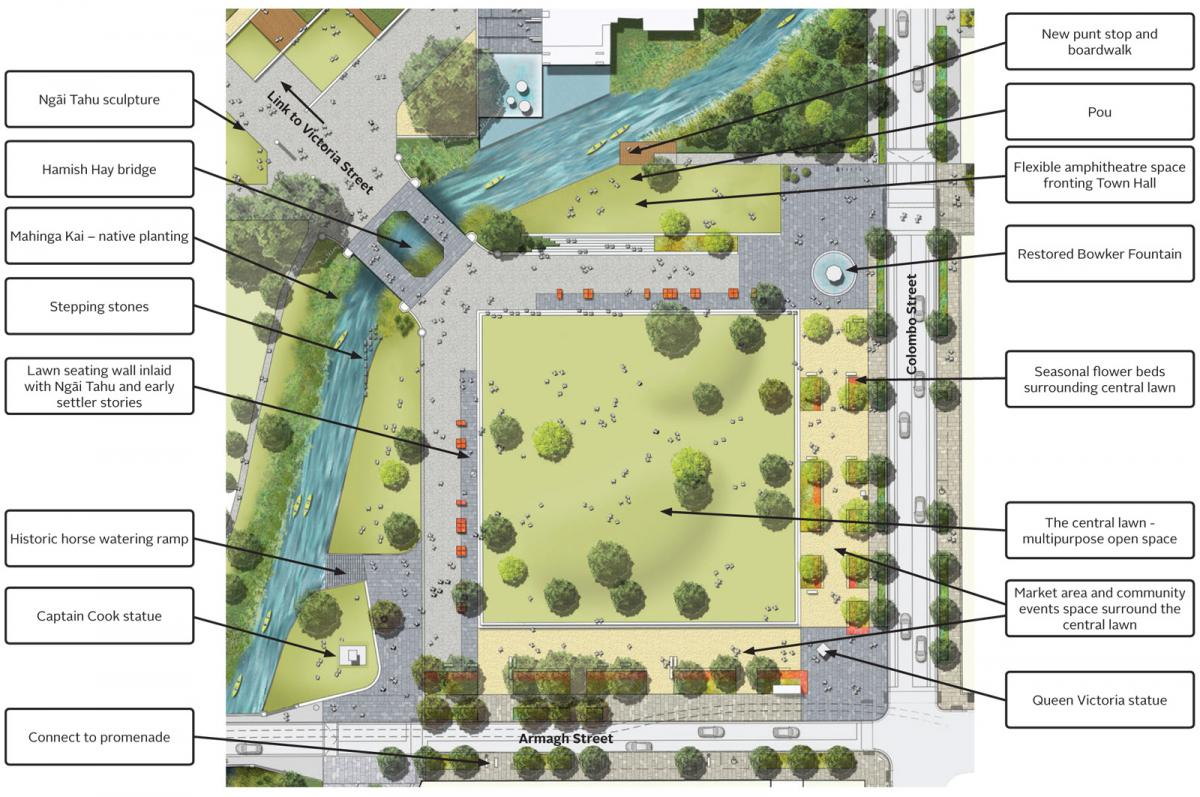
The 2014 CCDU proposal for redevelopment of the square would have replaced the award-winning landscaping from the 1980s with a large grass area.

The Christchurch Central Development Unit released plans in 2014 for a NZ$7,000,000 remodelling of the square as part of the Avon River precinct upgrade. The plan included a large multi-use grass area, outdoor market spaces, and a riverbank amphitheatre. The change would require the statues and Bowker fountain to be moved, as well as the removal and replacement of some established trees. The planned changes were heavily criticised, in part due to the perceived lack of consultation, but also the costly and seemingly unnecessary changes to the design from the late 1980s, which was largely undamaged in the earthquake. The government's announcement was not consultation, but was issued for information, and the resulting calls for a consultation exercise were initially denied. After significant public pressure the project was put on hold in February 2015, and a public consultation period started. In July 2015, draft plans were released for some restoration work that would see Victoria Square largely unchanged.

Part of the planned redevelopment included a Māori cultural centre — Te Puna Aruhea — to be built in Victoria Square on the former Crown Plaza site. The intention was for this to be a point of "welcome", including a place to conduct pōwhiri. Ngāi Tahu ultimately abandoned this proposal on the principle that a pōwhiri should be conducted at an established marae, and that there is no such marae in the central city. Ngāi Tahu historian and upoko (tribal leader) Te Maere Tau concluded that a pōwhiri in the central city is essentially meaningless under tikanga Māori, and that major pōwhiri should instead be conducted at the established Tuahiwi marae instead. The cultural centre would have stood on the former Crowne Plaza site, but it was never built. A number of Ngāi Tahu cultural art installations were included as part of the restored square to re-assert mana motuhake over the area. One such installation was a pair of upright waka carvings named Mana Motuhake, unveiled in 2019.

Beginning in 2017 the square was restored, with the restoration work completed in early 2018.

Time-lapse of Victoria Square through the decades

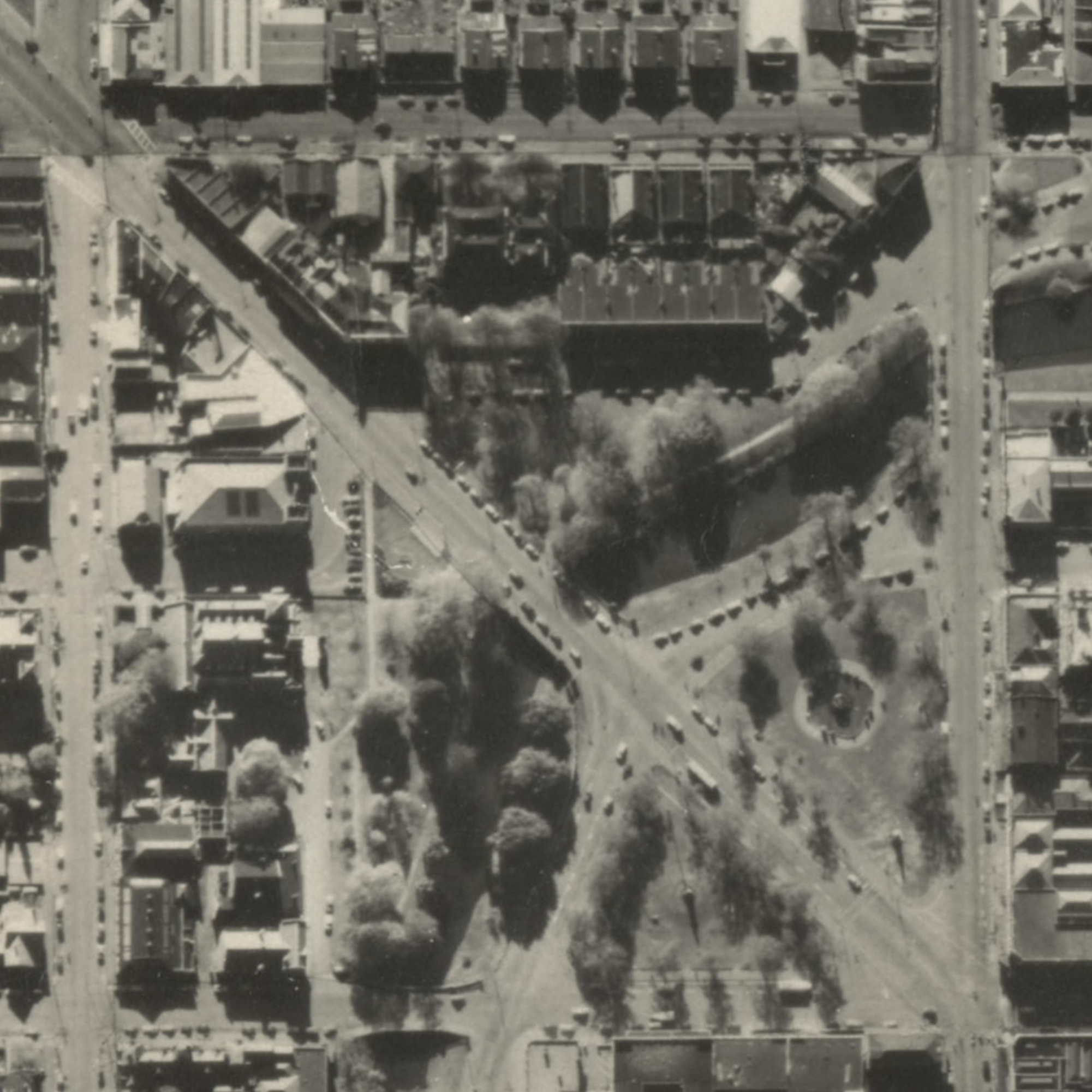
The square in the 1950s, with Victoria Street running through the middle

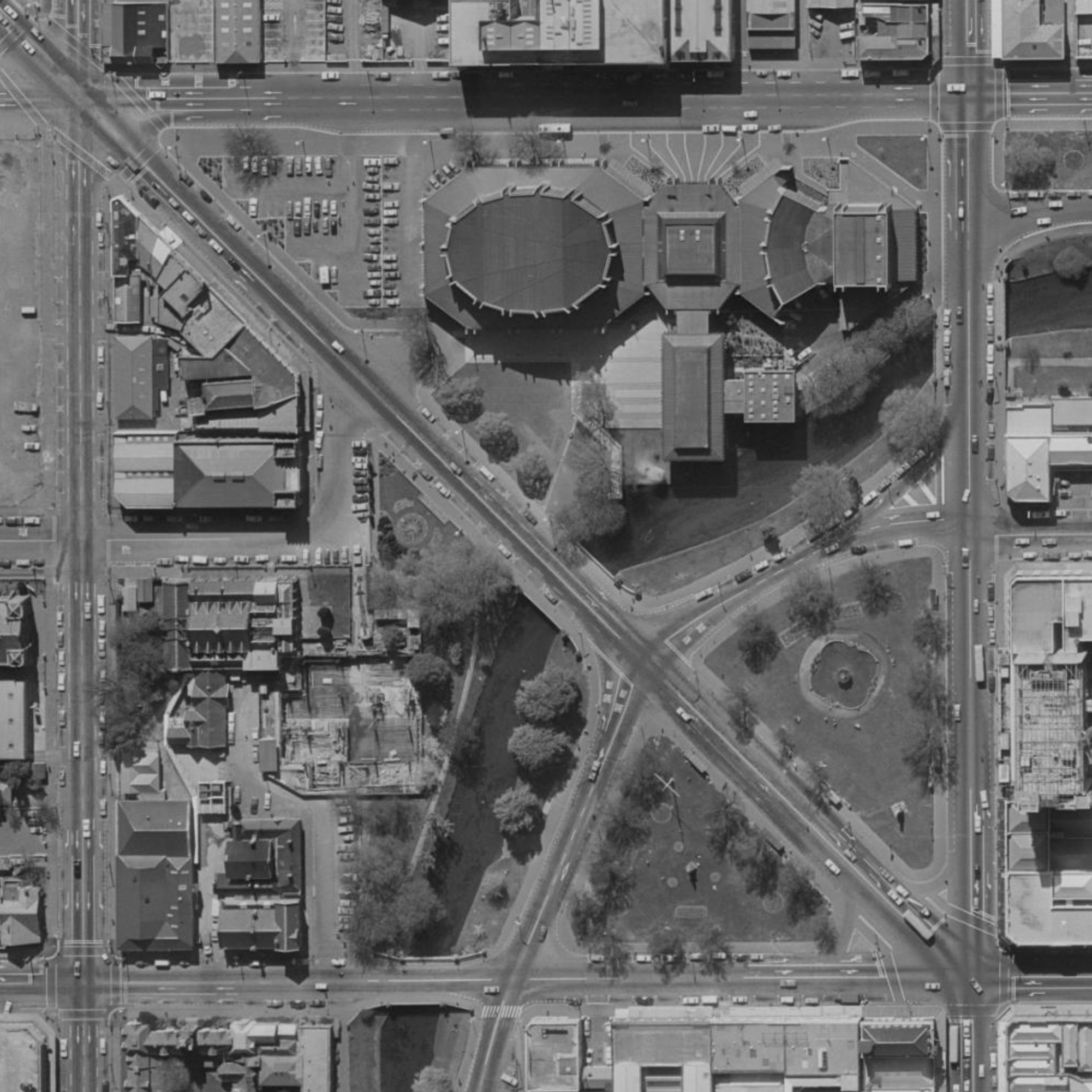
The square in the 1970s, with the newly-built Town Hall in the north-east

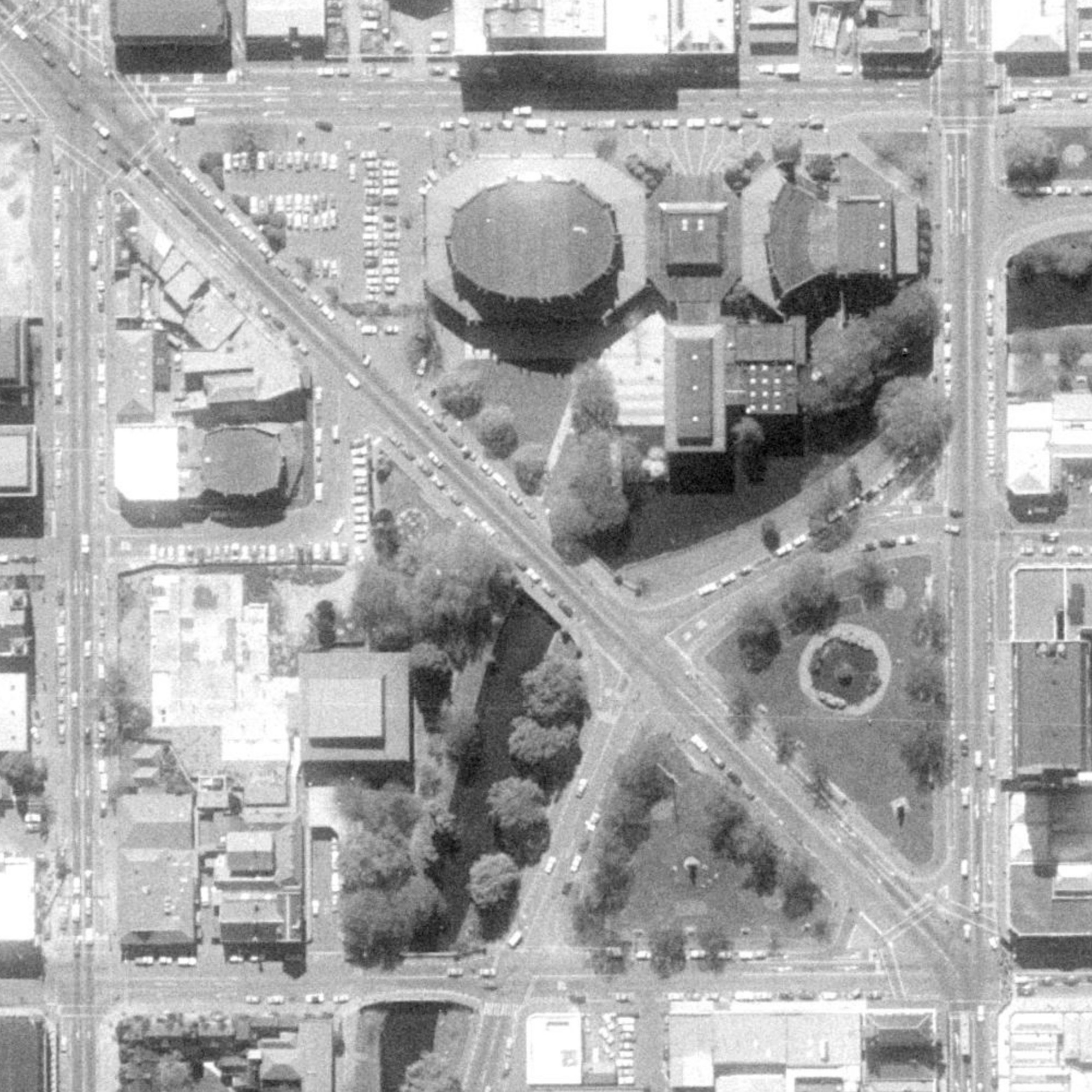
The square in the 1980s before the major redevelopment

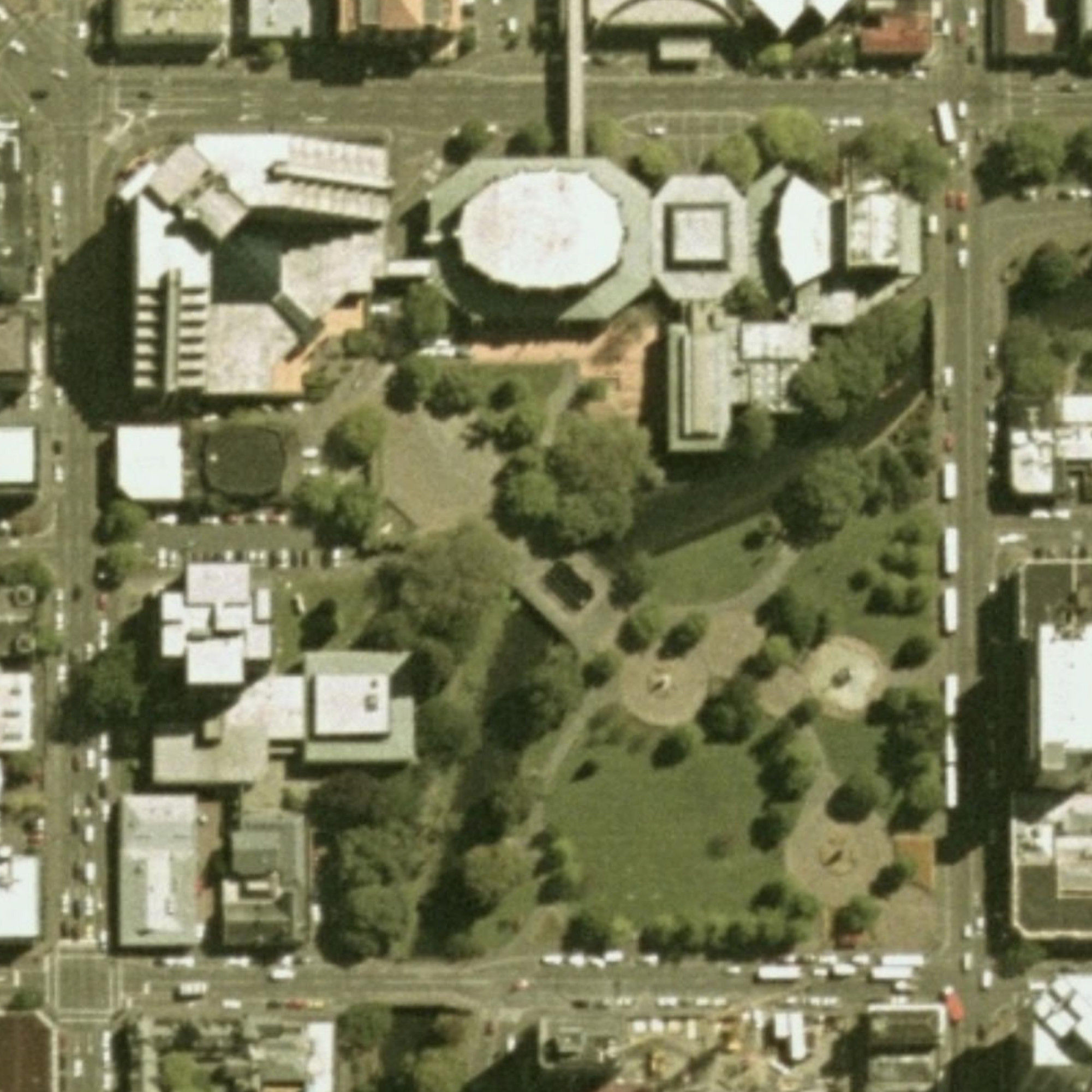
The square in the 2000s showing the layout after the redevelopment

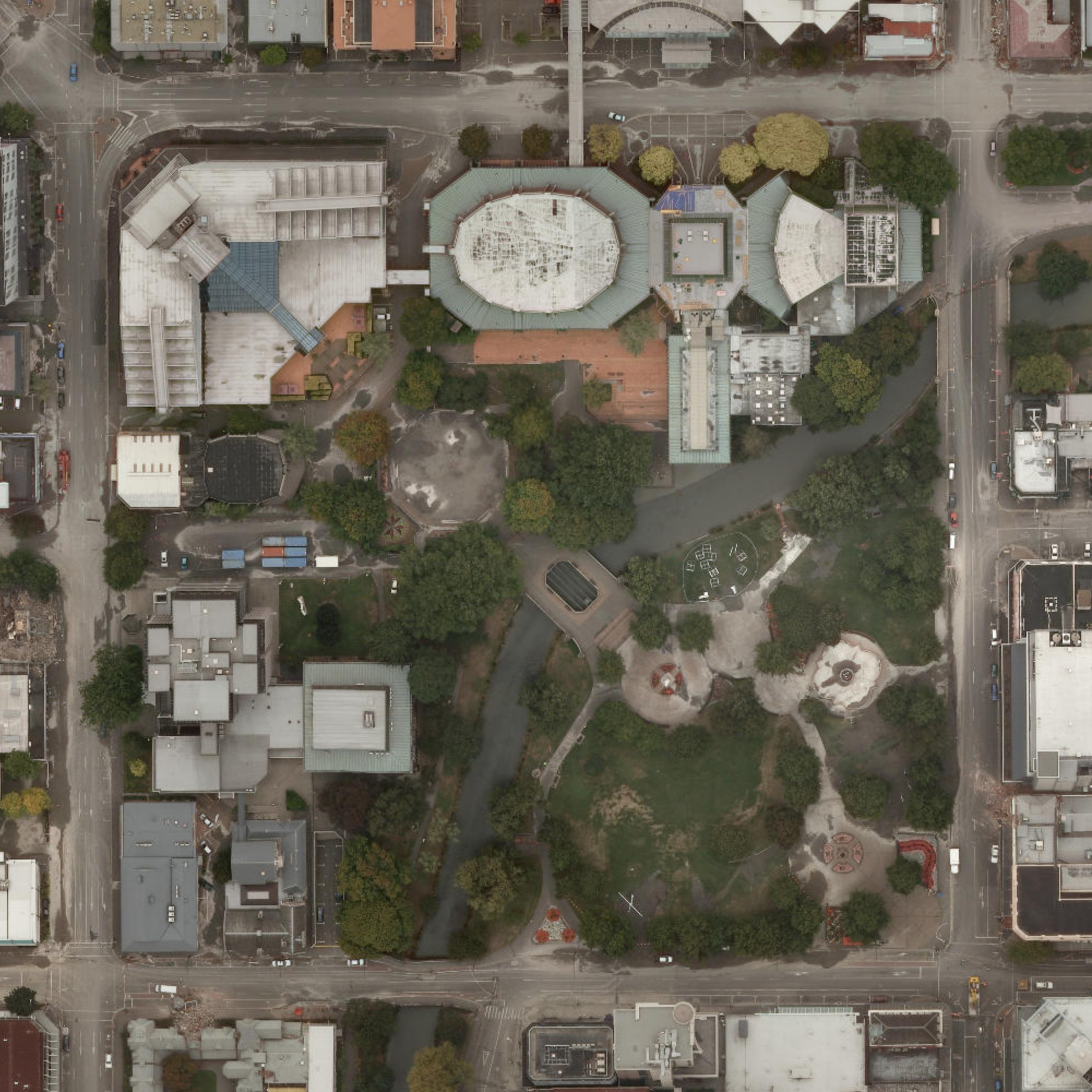
The square in 2012, after the 2011 Christchurch earthquake

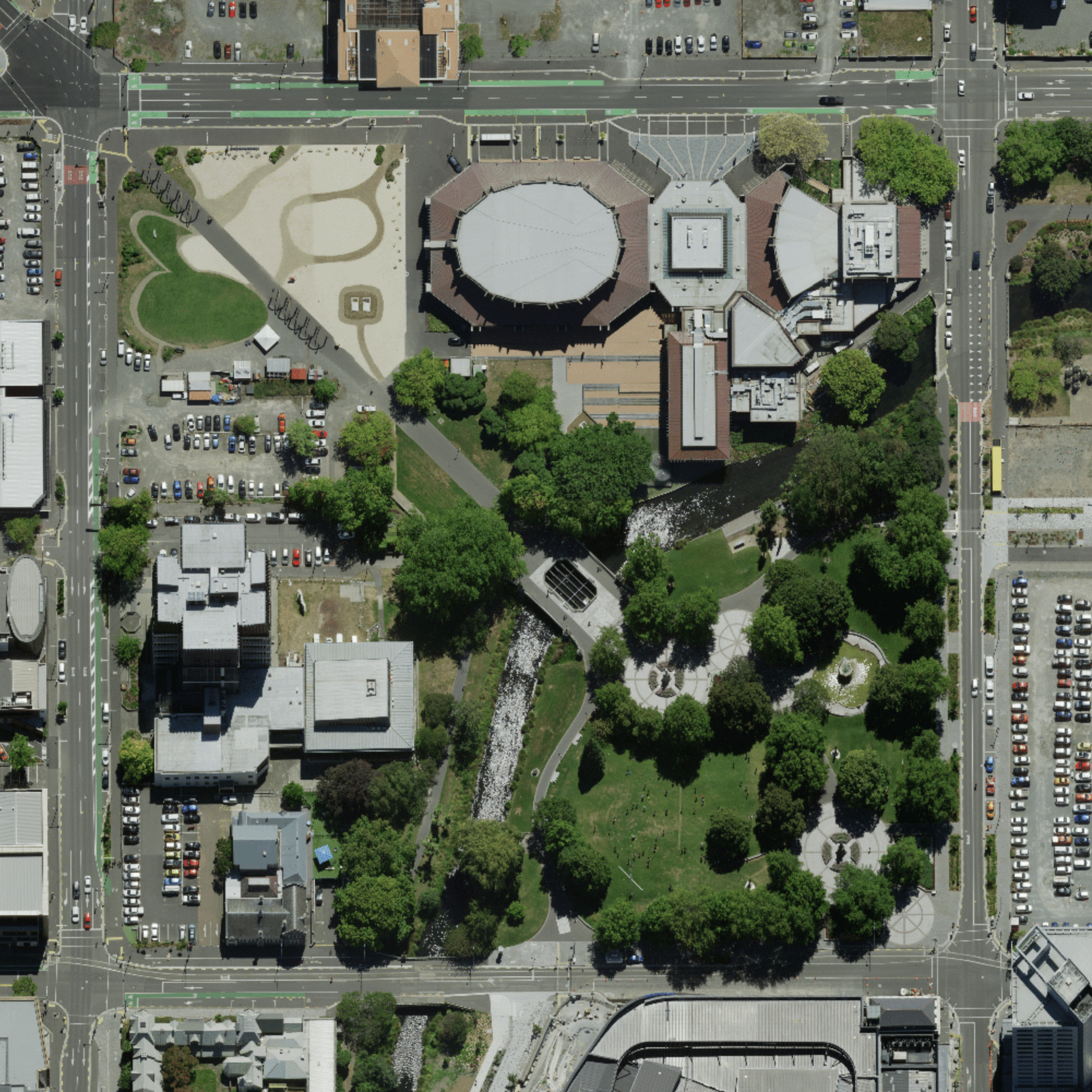
The square in the 2020s

== Events ==
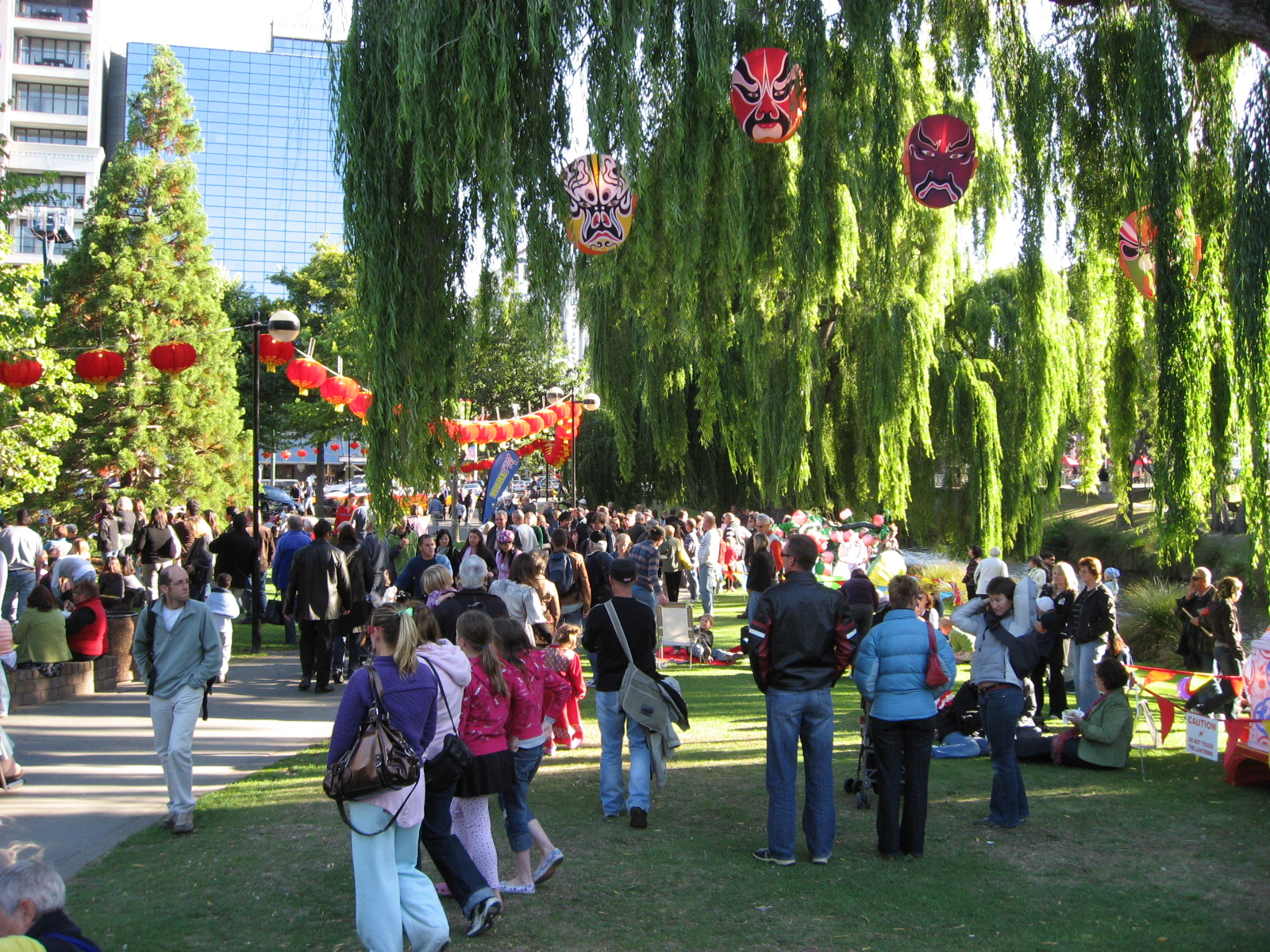
The Christchurch Lantern Festival in 2009

For much of its history, Victoria Square was a common location for political and religious gatherings, markets, and festivals. After World War II it became more of an urban greenspace and usage for public events declined. Since the landscaping undertaken in the late 1980s, more major public events have returned to the square.

Victoria Square has been the usual venue for the annual Christchurch Carols by Candlelight event on Christmas Eve. The event was temporarily moved to Latimer Square when Victoria Square was cordoned off as part of the Central City Red Zone. The event is organised by the Christchurch YMCA (now the Kind Foundation) in collaboration with local churches and the Christchurch Salvation Army brass band.

Since 2006 the Christchurch Lantern Festival has been held each February in Victoria Square. The event sees the Avon River including Victoria Square illuminated with Chinese paper lanterns. Timed to coincide with the Lunar New Year, the festival celebrates Chinese culture and attracts thousands of visitors annually.

Victoria Square has been used as an outdoor "busking pitch" venue for the World Buskers Festival.

== Transport ==
From 1880 onwards, the northward track of the original Christchurch tram system ran through the square on Victoria Street, connecting Cathedral Square to Papanui. The trams were operated by the Canterbury Tramway Company. While initially these were steam trams, they were upgraded to be electric in 1905. This section of track was also later used by the Fendalton-Opawa line. The trams stopped running through the square in 1954.

Prior to the 1970s, three roads open to car traffic ran through the square: Victoria Street, Oxford Terrace and Cambridge Terrace. Cambridge Terrace was closed to make way for the construction of the Christchurch Town Hall in the 1960s. The square was completely closed to car traffic as part of the changes made to the square in the 1980s.

Today the paths in the square are open to both cyclists and pedestrians, with right of way given to pedestrians. These paths are part of the City Promenade that runs through the central city on the banks of the Avon.

The modern Christchurch tramway system runs along the south side of the square on Armagh Street. There is a tram stop close to the intersection with Colombo Street. The nearest bus stop is to the north on Kilmore Street outside the Town Hall, however this is only serviced by north-bound buses on routes 1, 29 and 95.

== Features ==
As a historic park in the city centre of Christchurch, Victoria Square is home to a number of notable places.

=== Buildings ===
==== Christchurch Town Hall ====
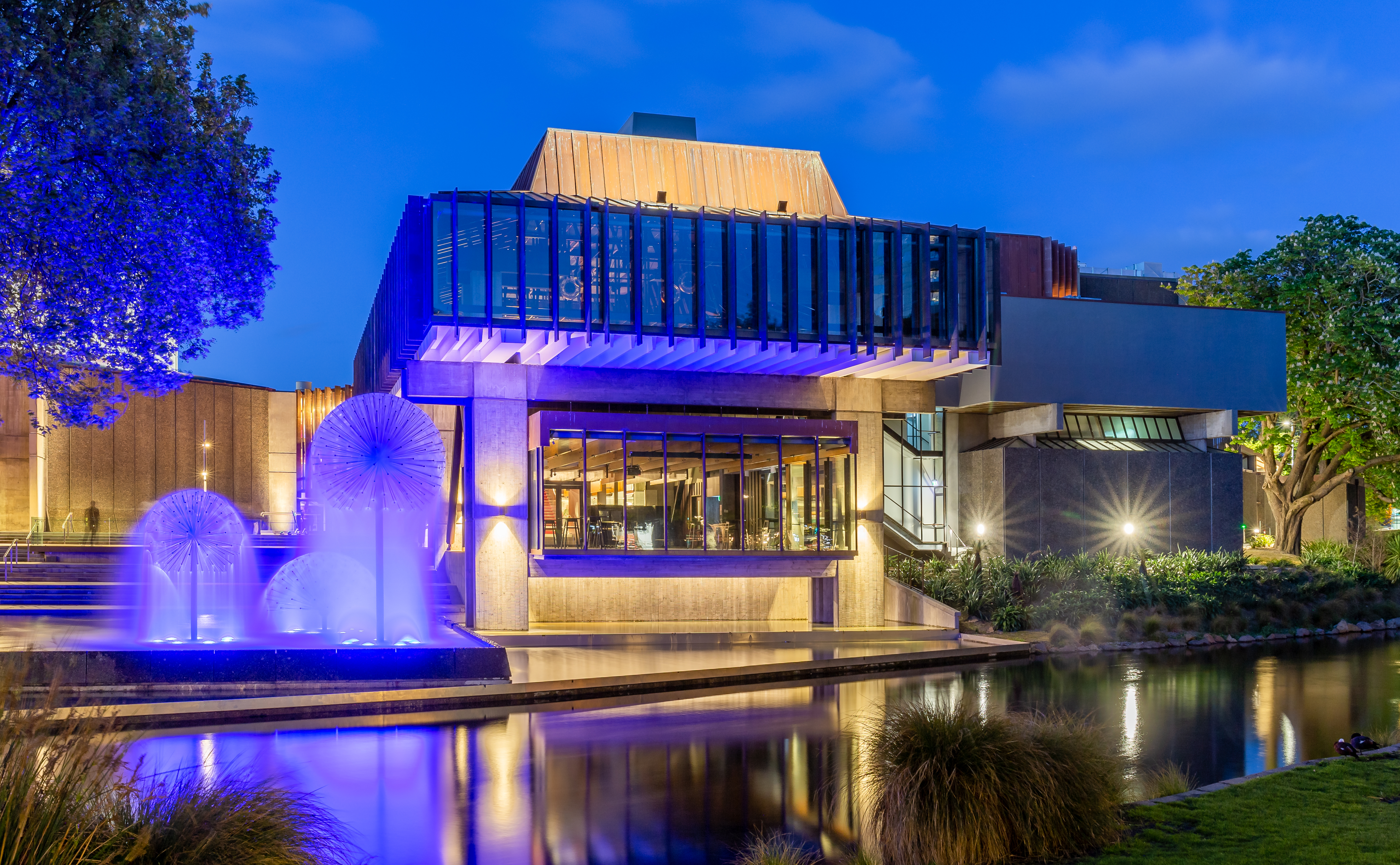
The Ferrier Fountain illuminated at night, in front of the Christchurch Town Hall.

The Christchurch Town Hall was built on the northern side of the square between Kilmore Street and the Avon River / Ōtākaro. Designed by architects Warren and Mahoney in the brutalist style, it opened in 1972. Despite sustaining significant damage in the 2011 Christchurch earthquake, it was restored and reopened in 2019. It is listed as a category-I historic place by Heritage New Zealand.

==== The Bricks ====
In 1903 two rows of British-style terraced houses were built on the northern side of the square, where the James Hay auditorium is today. The buildings looked out across the Avon River into the square, and featured an imposing row of Victorian era brick arches stacked two storeys high. Confusingly they shared their name with the original landing site of brothers William and John Deans near the Barbadoes Street Bridge further down the Avon River. They were demolished to make way for the new town hall in the late 1960s.

==== The Limes ====
Constructed in 1882, the home of Dr James Irving stood on Cambridge Terrace, at the location of what is now the Town Hall auditorium. Irving planted a row of lime trees in front of his house, and as the trees matured they became a local landmark, and gave the building its name. The building was a significant two-storey brick structure. In 1904, after Irving's death, his widow sold the property and it was converted into a private hospital. The Limes remained a leading private hospital in Christchurch, despite the building eventually no longer being fit for purpose. It changed hands several times, before finally closing in 1961. The building was purchased by the Anglican Diocese of Christchurch. The diocese finally chose to sell it to the Christchurch City Council in 1963 as part of the site of the new town hall. The original building was demolished in the late 1960s. The banquet hall in the new town hall building was named The Limes Room in reference to the former hospital, and still bears this name today.

==== Magistrates Court ====
The former Magistrates' Court building sits on the western side of the square. Built in the gothic revival style in 1881, it is the oldest purpose-built court building in Christchurch, and was used as the Family Court until 2017. The building is today used as a childcare centre. It is listed as a category-I historic place by Heritage New Zealand.

==== Isaac House ====
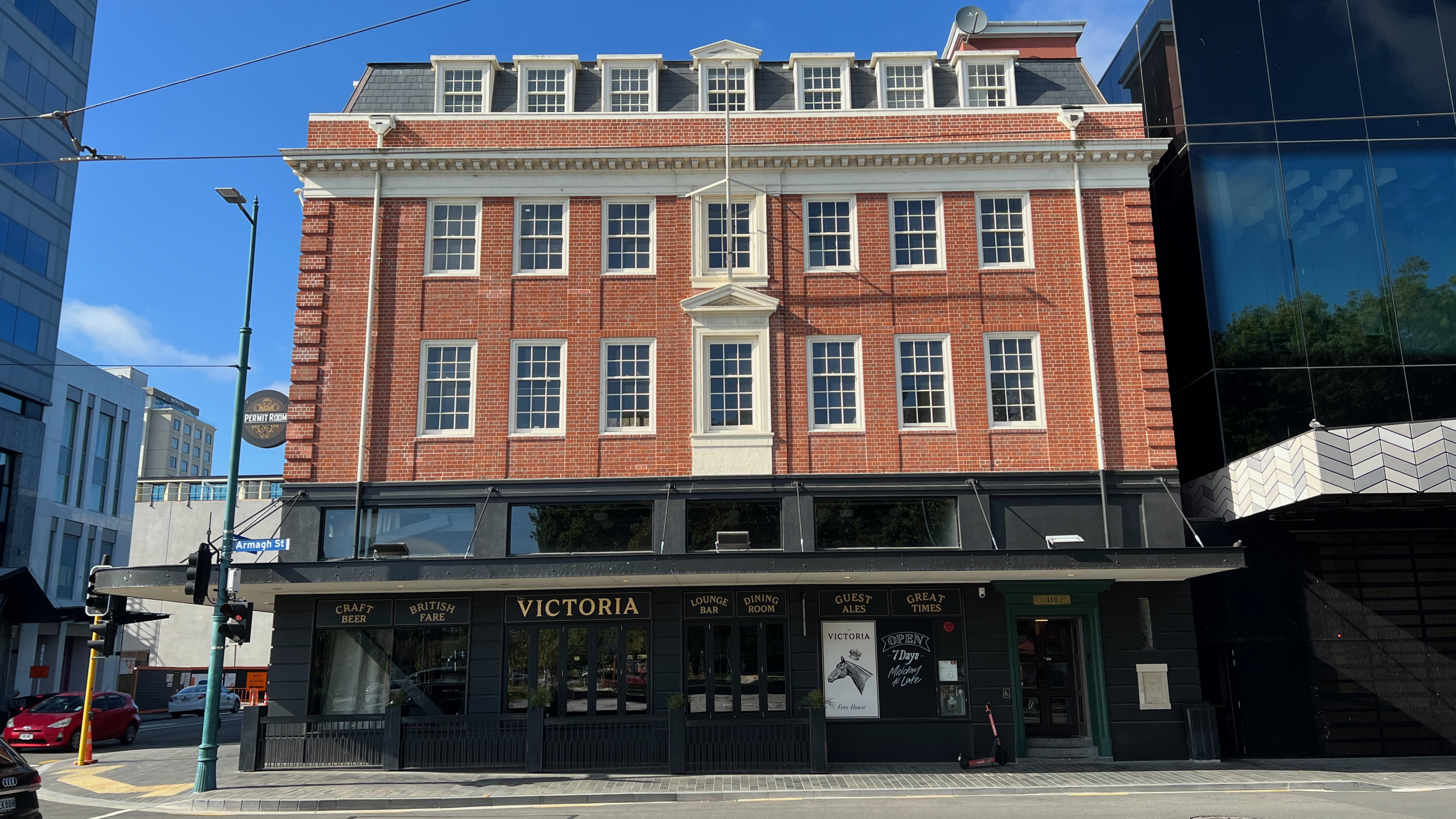
Isaac House in February 2024.

Isaac House is a listed heritage building on the corner of Colombo and Armagh streets at the south-east corner of the square. Designed in the inter-war Georgian revival style, it was built in 1926 and spent much of its life as medical rooms, and later as a branch of the National Bank of New Zealand. It was considered for demolition as part of the Te Pae Christchurch Convention Centre, but the building was ultimately saved and restored, with the Te Pae convention centre built around it. It is listed as a category-II historic place by Heritage New Zealand. As of 2024 the building is occupied by a pub known as The Victoria Free House.

==== Te Pae Convention Centre ====
Te Pae Convention Centre sits on Armagh Street opposite the south side of the square. The convention centre was built as a replacement for the previous Christchurch Convention Centre opposite the Town Hall on Kilmore Street, which was demolished after the earthquake. The design is intended to be evocative of the braided rivers of the Canterbury Plains.

==== Hay's department store ====
Local businessman James Hay opened a department store on Gloucester Street in December 1929. The building continue to expand, adding frontages on Colombo Street in 1938 and finally on Armagh Street in 1942. The Armagh Street frontage was opposite Victoria Square, on the modern-day site of Te Pae Christchurch Convention Centre. The department store was notable for devoting the rooftop to children's entertainment, including a house of mirrors and a playground.

==== Armstrongs Building ====
The Armstrongs Building was a department store that faced into the eastern-side of the square on Colombo Street. Opened in 1933, it was a replacement for the two older buildings that had previously occupied the site. The department store closed in 1968, and the building was sold to the Union Steam Ship Company and renamed to the Union Centre Building. For the later part of its life it was occupied by a law firm, banks and travel agencies. The building was damaged by a major fire in October 1993, but the damage was not structural and it was soon repaired. The fire was considered to be suspicious. In 1999 a bar called the Vic and Whale opened in the building, and became a popular part of the Christchurch nightlife.

The building sustained significant damage during the 2011 Christchurch earthquake and was demolished. Previously it was listed as a category-II historic place by Heritage New Zealand. As of 2024 the land remains undeveloped, with owner Philip Carter saying in 2018 that, "we will sit and wait until that area has advanced a bit".

In 2019 the Roman Catholic Diocese of Christchurch announced plans to construct a new cathedral as a replacement for the Cathedral of the Blessed Sacrament on the block between Colombo, Armagh and Manchester streets, in partnership with the Carter Group. The plan was put on hold in 2023 pending a canonical legal challenge, and then abandoned in 2024. The diocese announced they would sell off the land they own in the area, and as of 2024 it remains undeveloped.

=== Spaces ===
==== The Commons ====
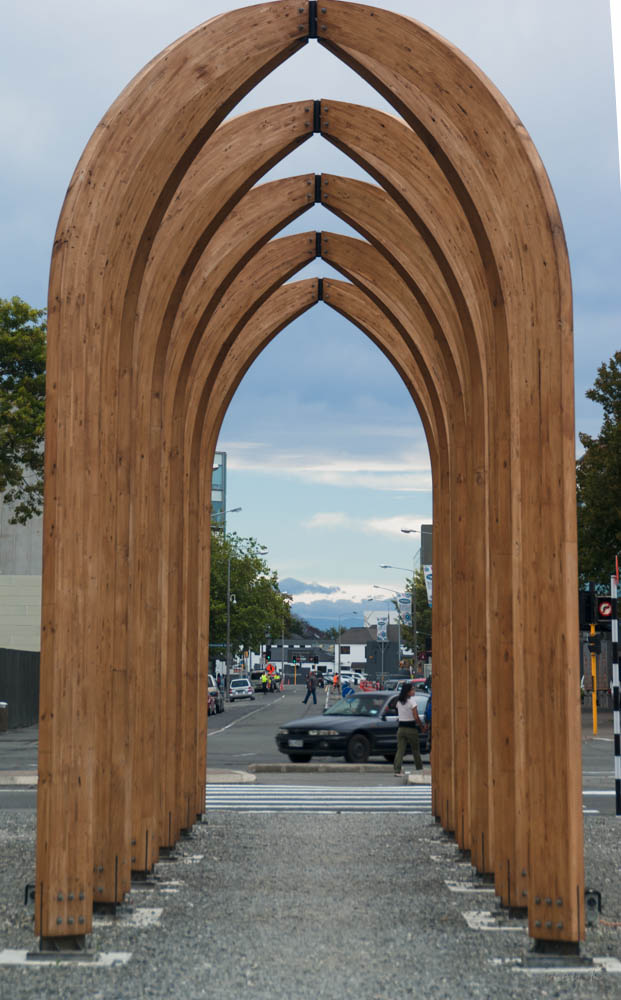
The Arcades is a series of arched pergolas on the former Crowne Plaza hotel site.

The Crowne Plaza (originally the Park Royal) was a hotel built in the north-western corner of the square in 1988. Construction of the hotel involved closing Victoria Street at the corner of Kilmore and Durham Street. Though this closure was met with opposition, it also prompted the complete redevelopment of the square that happened at the end of the 1980s. At the time of construction the L-shaped building had the largest atrium in New Zealand. It suffered significant earthquake damage and was demolished in 2012.

After the demolition the former building footprint was renamed The Commons and used by the Gap Filler charitable trust as the location of several community projects. These included the "Pallet Pavilion" — an outdoor venue made from over 3000 blue wooden shipping pallets — and the "Retro Sports Facility" which provided a space for field sports such as football and cricket. It included a portable grandstand named the "Grandstandium" built on a flatbed trailer.

The area is also home to The Arcades, a series of tall wooden arched pergolas that run diagonally from the corner of Kilmore and Durham Streets into the square. These provide a path for foot traffic entering the square from the north-west. Intended as a temporary feature, The Arcades were designed by architect Andrew Just for Jessica Halliday and Ryan Reynolds of the Life in Vacant Spaces trust, and built in 2013. The arches are designed to invoke a "vaguely gothic" feel, and were modelled on the shape of the south entrance to the Canterbury Provincial Council Buildings. The Arcades are owned by Te Pūtahi Centre for Architecture and City Making.

In 2019 the world's largest public hāngī pits were dug on the site between The Arcades and the Town Hall. The pits were dug by representatives of Ngāi Tūāhuriri, a hapū of Ngāi Tahu, as part of the Christchurch Arts Festival.

In 2024, Christchurch City Council confirmed that the Commons was being wound down as a public space, with the removal of public toilets. As of 2024 a sign on the site says it will likely be built on "in the foreseeable future".

=== Fountains ===
==== Ferrier Fountain ====
The Ferrier Fountain was installed in 1972 alongside the Town Hall. The fountain was donated by Jack and Marjorie Ferrier and built by the British company Ustigate. It is a modernist sculpture reminiscent of dandelion seedheads, made up of two spheres and a hemisphere above a pool of water and surrounded by brickwork terraces. The fountain can be illuminated with coloured lights at night. In 2019 the Mayor of Christchurch, Lianne Dalziel, called it "one of the most iconic images of Christchurch". The brickwork terraces were significantly damaged in the 2011 Christchurch earthquake, but were later restored.

==== Bowker Fountain ====
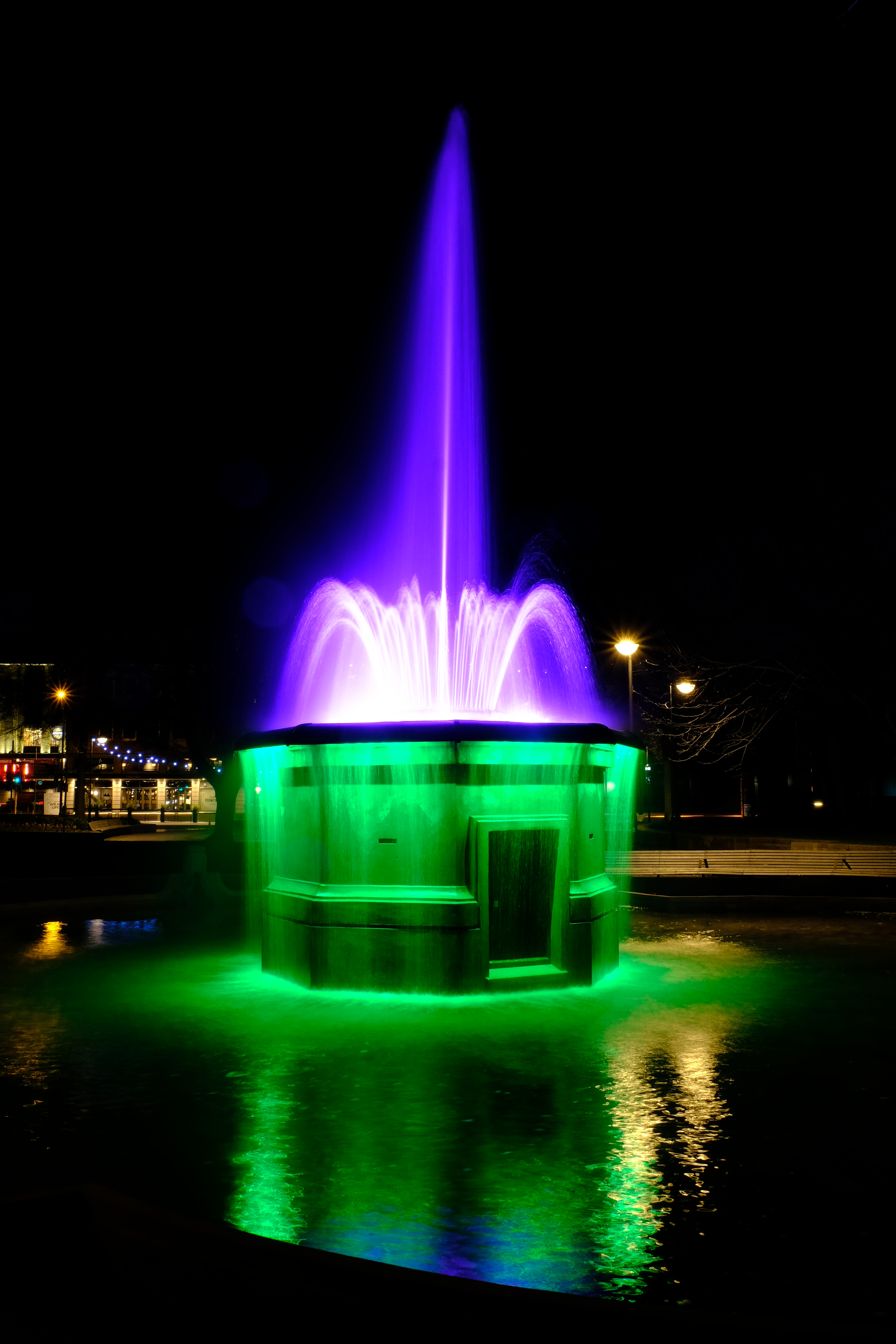
The Bowker Fountain illuminated at night.

Local businessman Henry Layton Bowker had an office on Colombo Street overlooking the square, and willed a £1,000 portion of his estate to the city to build a fountain near the town hall. After his death in 1921, and with no concrete plans for a town hall to be built, his son suggested the fountain should instead be constructed in Victoria Square to replace the recently removed band rotunda. Designed by city architects A. R. Galbraith and Victor Hean, when the fountain opened in 1931 it was the first to be lit with electricity in the Southern Hemisphere. The central plinth of the fountain sits in the centre of a large pool of shallow water. Despite being damaged in the Christchurch earthquake, it was restored and reopened with the rest of the square in 2019. Within hours of reopening a vandal poured washing powder into the fountain, causing it to foam up.

=== Bridges ===
==== Hamish Hay Bridge ====
The Hamish Hay Bridge is a historic bridge in the centre of the square, crossing the Avon River. The first bridge at that crossing point was constructed in 1852, with the present-day bridge constructed in 1864. The early bridge was variably named the Papanui Bridge or the Market Place Bridge. When the current bridge was constructed in 1864, it was named Victoria Bridge. It was later widened, and between 1905 and 1954 carried the trams that ran from the central city northwards to Papanui. It is the oldest cast-iron and stone bridge in New Zealand, with the central portion of the deck removed to expose the original metalwork. In 1989 it was renamed in honour of the outgoing mayor, Hamish Hay. It is listed as a category-II historic place by Heritage New Zealand.

==== Armagh Street Bridge ====
Opened in 1883, the Armagh Street Bridge crosses the Avon River in the south-west corner of the square. It sits between the Magistrates’ Court building, the Canterbury Provincial Council Buildings and the Te Pae Convention Centre precinct. It is listed as a category-II historic place by Heritage New Zealand.

==== Colombo Street Bridge ====
The Colombo Street Bridge crosses the Avon River at the north-eastern corner of the square. It was built in 1902 as a replacement for the previous wooden bridge, and was further widened in 1930.

=== Installations ===
==== Te Ahi Kaa ====
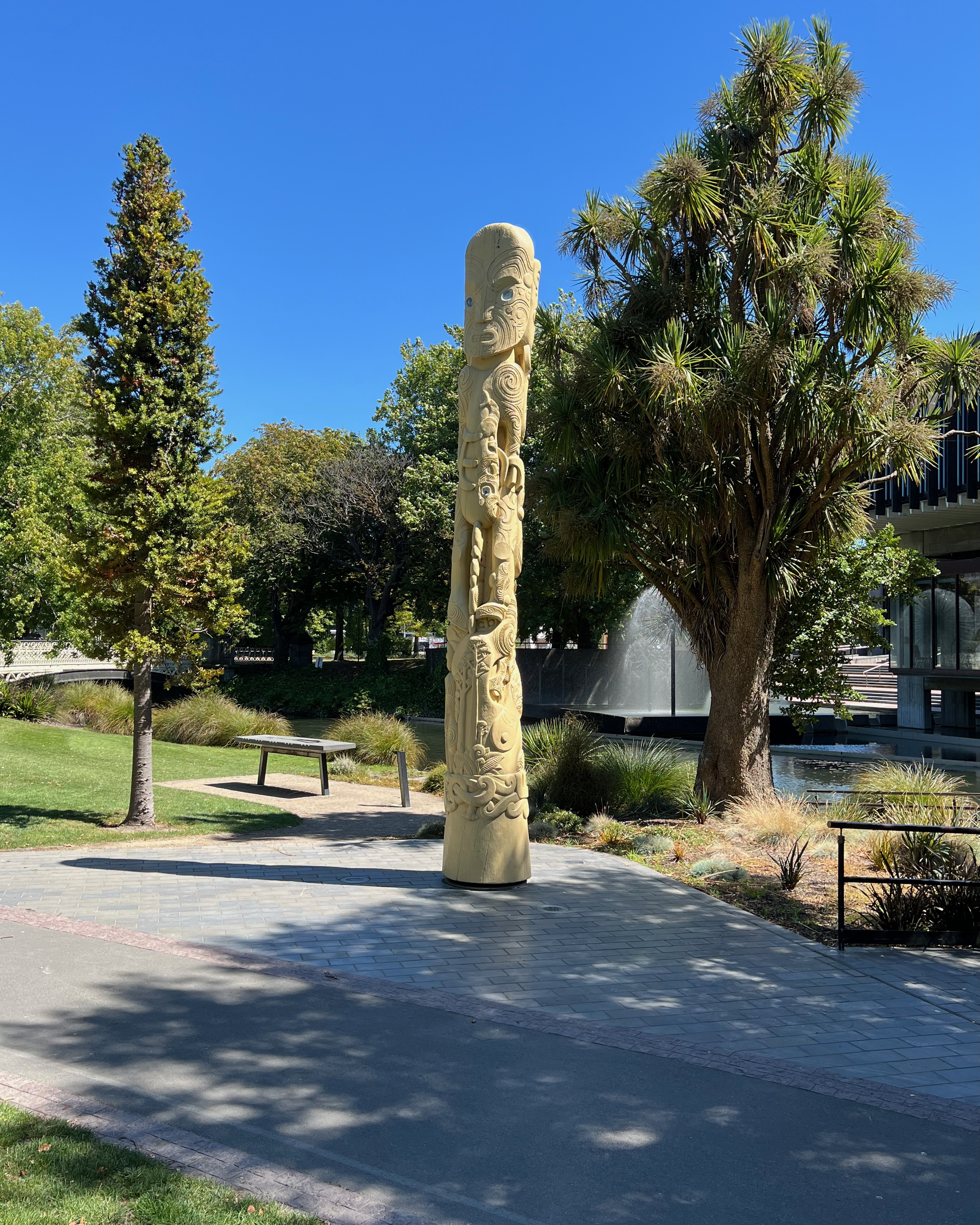
The pouwhenua Te Ahi Kaa stands in front of the Town Hall, on the south bank of the Avon River.

A pouwhenua was erected on the south bank of the Avon River in 1994, opposite the Town Hall. Created to commemorate the signing of Te Tiriti o Waitangi by Ngāi Tahu, the pou stands 6 metres (20 ft) tall and was carved from tōtara by Riki Manuel. The carvings represent the themes of mahinga kai (a place to gather food) and tipuna (ancestry). It suffered two arson attacks in 1995. A bronze plaque reads "He poupou tohu ahi-ka o Ngāi Tahu" (A mark of the long burning fires of Ngāi Tahu).

A tauranga (a berthing place for waka), a significant cabbage tree (cordyline australis), and a concrete table depicting kanakana are situated behind the pouwhenua.

==== Statue of James Cook ====
A marble sculpture of the British explorer James Cook was unveiled in 1932 to commemorate his three journeys to New Zealand. It was designed by William Trethewey. It is listed as a category-II historic place by Heritage New Zealand.

==== Mana Motuhake ====
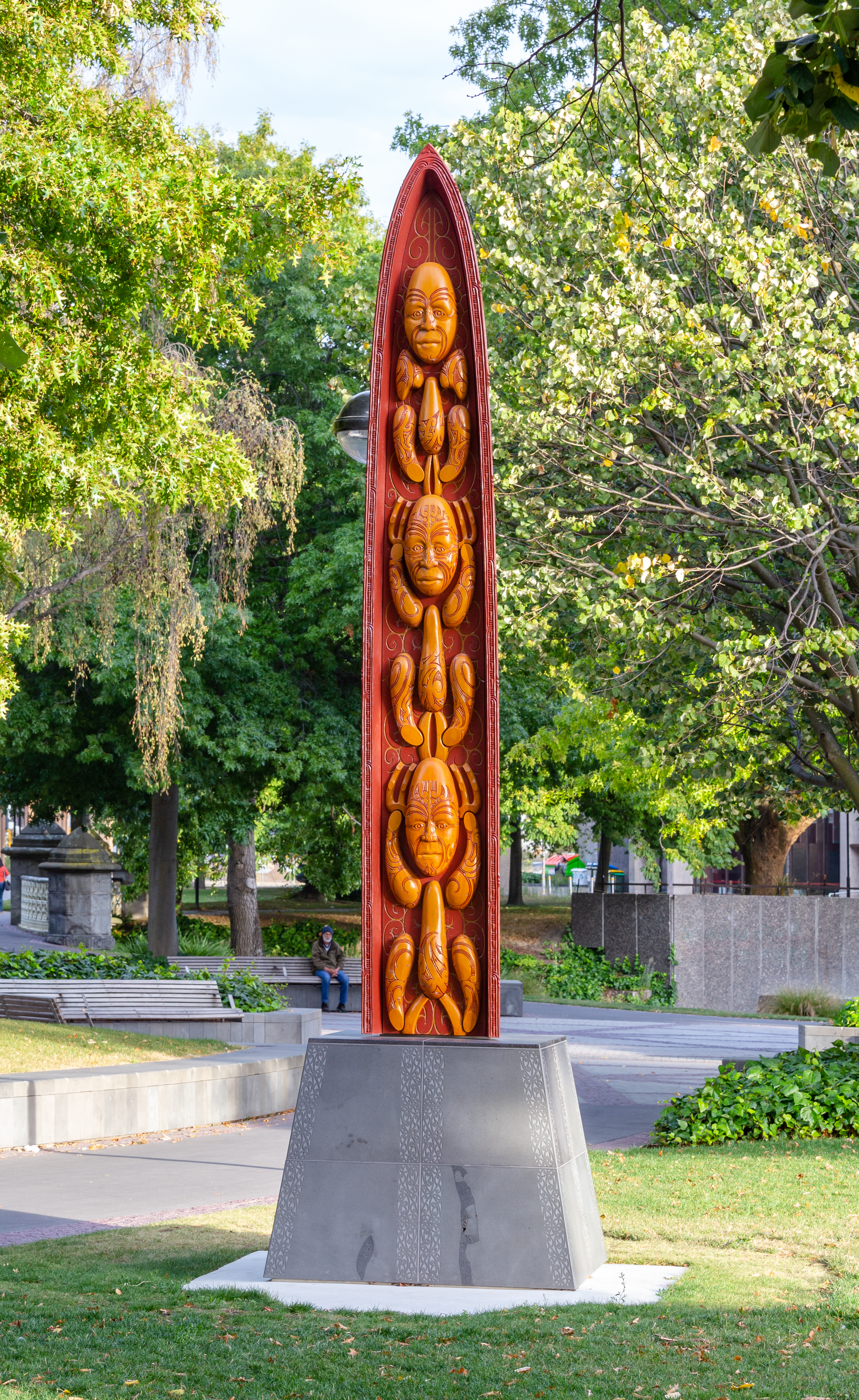
One of the pair of waka sculptures that make up the Mana Motuhake installation.

Mana Motuhake is a pair of upright waka sculptures close to the statue of Queen Victoria. Carved by Ngāi Tahu carver Fayne Robinson and unveiled in 2019 they pay tribute to the signatories of the Treaty of Waitangi and the shared cultural history of the area. They took around 2500 hours to carve, with the carved forms depicting the moko of the Ngāi Tahu signatories.

==== Red Telephone Box ====
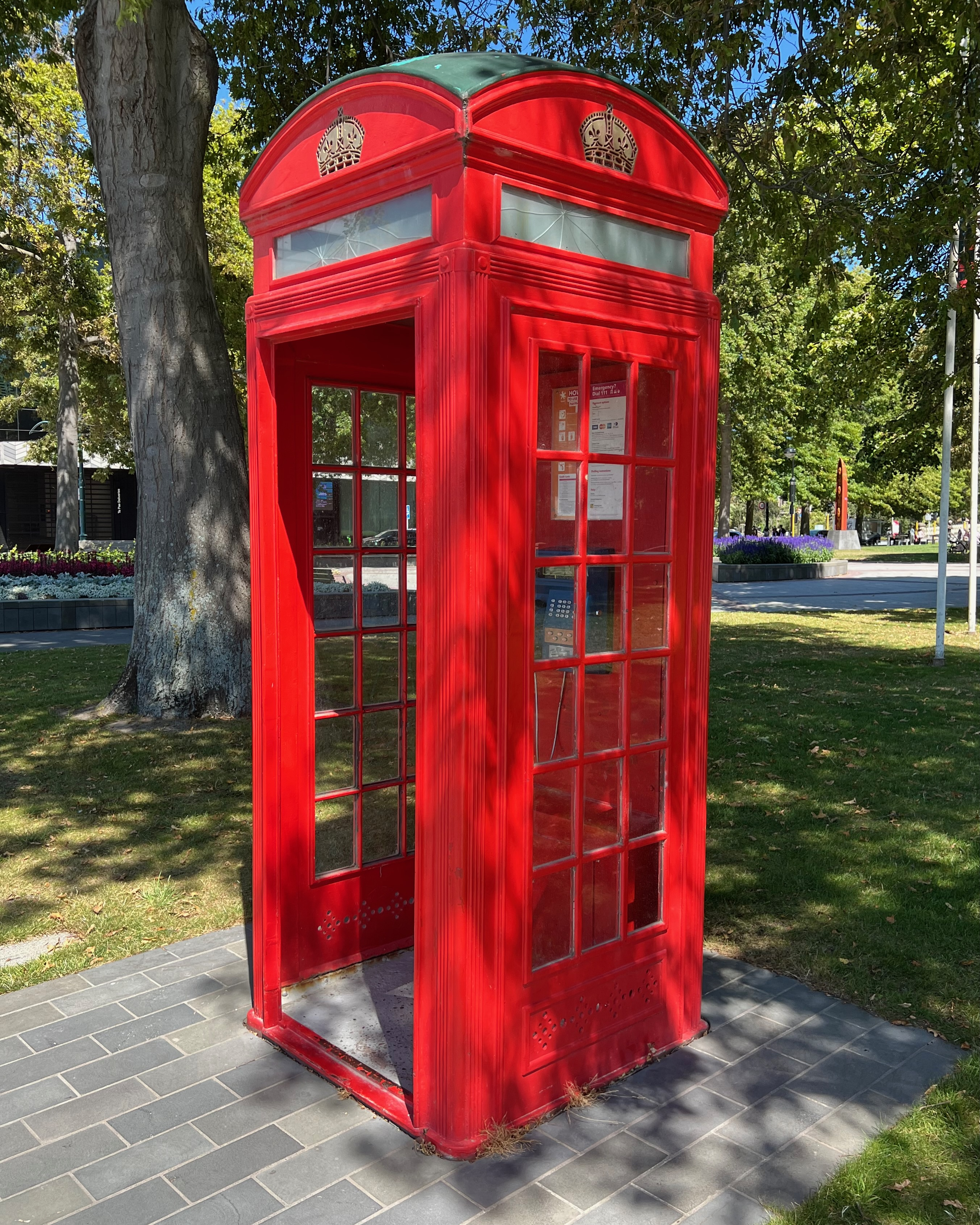
The red telephone box on Colombo Street was a battleground in the "Telephone Box War" during the late 1980s.

The red telephone box stands on the eastern side of the square, opposite to where the Armstrongs Building once stood. The box is a red K2 design (Note: Some sources describe the telephone box as a K7 design. However, the K7 was only ever an experimental prototype, and as the telephone box was imported in the 1920s it is likely to be of the K2 variety that was most common at the time.) imported from the United Kingdom in the 1920s, and it is the last remaining such telephone box in Christchurch. It was installed some time before 1932.

In 1988 Telecom took over management of the phone network from the New Zealand Post Office. They made the decision to repaint all existing telephone boxes in a pale blue to align with their new branding. Their ultimate goal was to replace all phone boxes with a more modern steel and glass design. The Wizard of New Zealand took exception to these plans and began "The Telephone Box War" — he and his supporters, including Alf's Imperial Army, began a guerilla campaign to repaint the boxes back to red. The box in Victoria Square was the second to be repainted to red in the "war". Ultimately Telecom reversed their decision after a survey showed majority support for keeping the boxes red, and the city council provided The Wizard with free red paint to restore the phone boxes that had been altered.

In 1990 the telephone box was removed from Victoria Square for maintenance, and The Wizard — suspicious that it was going to be replaced with a modern box — insisted that it be returned unaltered. The box was flooded by liquefaction during the 2011 Christchurch earthquake, but remained in place during the restoration of the square. It is still a working public phone box, with service provided by Spark.

==== Statue of Queen Victoria ====
The bronze statue of Queen Victoria was erected in 1903 to commemorate the Queen's life and also the 50th anniversary of the European settlement of Canterbury. When it was unveiled, the square was renamed from Market Place to Victoria Square in honour of Queen Victoria. Today the statue stands in the south-east corner of the square, facing the Armagh-Colombo intersection. It was designed by Francis John Williamson and is listed as a category-II historic place by Heritage New Zealand.

Behind the statue of Victoria, the low stone walls feature sandblasted artwork. This installation — named Parerau — was created by artist Jennifer Rendall and depicts the plants, leaves and seeds of Canterbury.

==== Horse watering ramp ====
A ramp into the Avon River for watering horses was constructed close to the Armagh Street Bridge in December 1874. It is unclear when exactly this was paved with cobblestones, but probably sometime between 1874 and the 1880s. This was a replacement for an older watering place closer to the Hamish Hay Bridge (then the Victoria Bridge). The original watering place was closed by the city council earlier in 1874.

==== Floral clock ====
A floral clock sits in the north-western corner of the square, between the Town Hall and the former Christchurch Law Court Buildings. It was donated in 1955 by the Calder Mackay department store and unveiled by Christchurch Beautifying Association secretary-treasurer Barbara MacMaster. The clock was moved a short distance as part of the redevelopment in 1989.

==== Weeping willows boulder ====
A large boulder with an embedded bronze plaque commemorates the early French settler François Le Lievre of Akaroa. The plaque explains that the weeping willows that stand along the banks of the Avon are from cuttings brought to New Zealand by Le Lievre.

==== Whariki ====
Three paved mosaics in the style of whāriki (woven mats) are located near the three bridges in the square. They are part of a series of thirteen such installations along the Otākaro in central Christchurch, representative of Ngāi Tahu customary use and kaitiakitanga of the river.

=== Historic attractions ===
==== Ice Cream Charlie ====
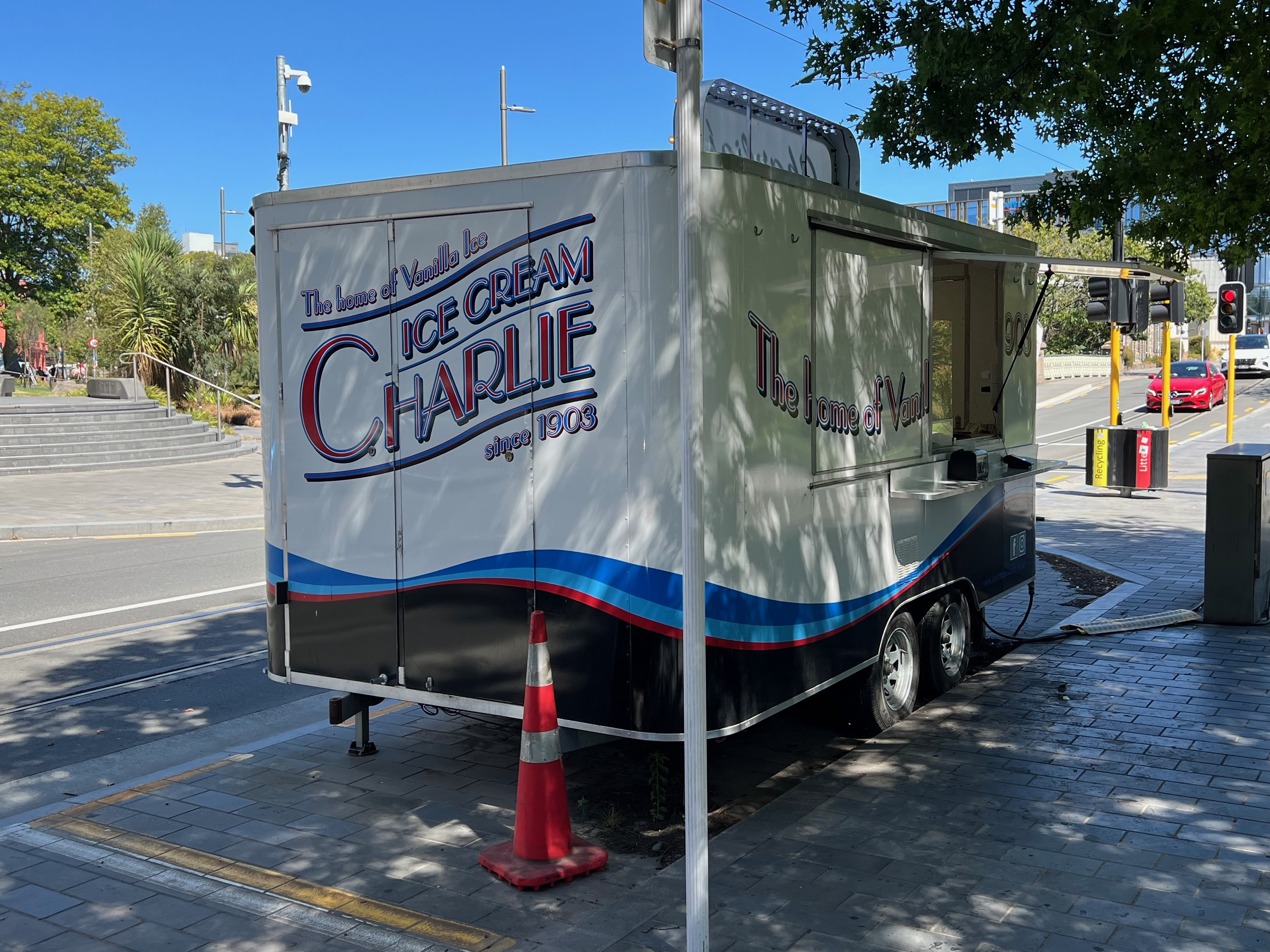
The Ice Cream Charlie truck is permanently parked on Armagh Street opposite Te Pae.

Ice Cream Charlie is an ice-cream vendor that operates from a semi-permanent cart opposite the Te Pae Christchurch Convention Centre on Armagh Street, at the south-side of the square. The cart was first opened by a Muslim immigrant, Sali Mahomet, in 1903. The cart specialises in "Vanilla Ice"; a dessert designed by Mahomet of handmade vanilla ice-cream flavoured with a syrup. Mohamet's original wooden carts are preserved at the Ferrymead Heritage Park, and the business has been owned by only three families since. The cart re-opened in 2014 after the Christchurch earthquakes. In 2020 the present cart — nicknamed "Peggy" — was unveiled to replace the previous pink cart ("Edith") that had been a fixture of the square for over 70 years.

== In popular culture ==
In the American television show Parks and Recreation, some detailed maps of the fictional town of Pawnee, Indiana are based on maps of Christchurch. In the fictional town Victoria Street is renamed to Victory Street, and Victoria Square is renamed to "River Park".

== See also ==
- Cranmer Square
- Latimer Square
- List of historic places in Christchurch
