= Golden Jubilee of Queen Victoria =

50th anniversary of the British monarch's accession

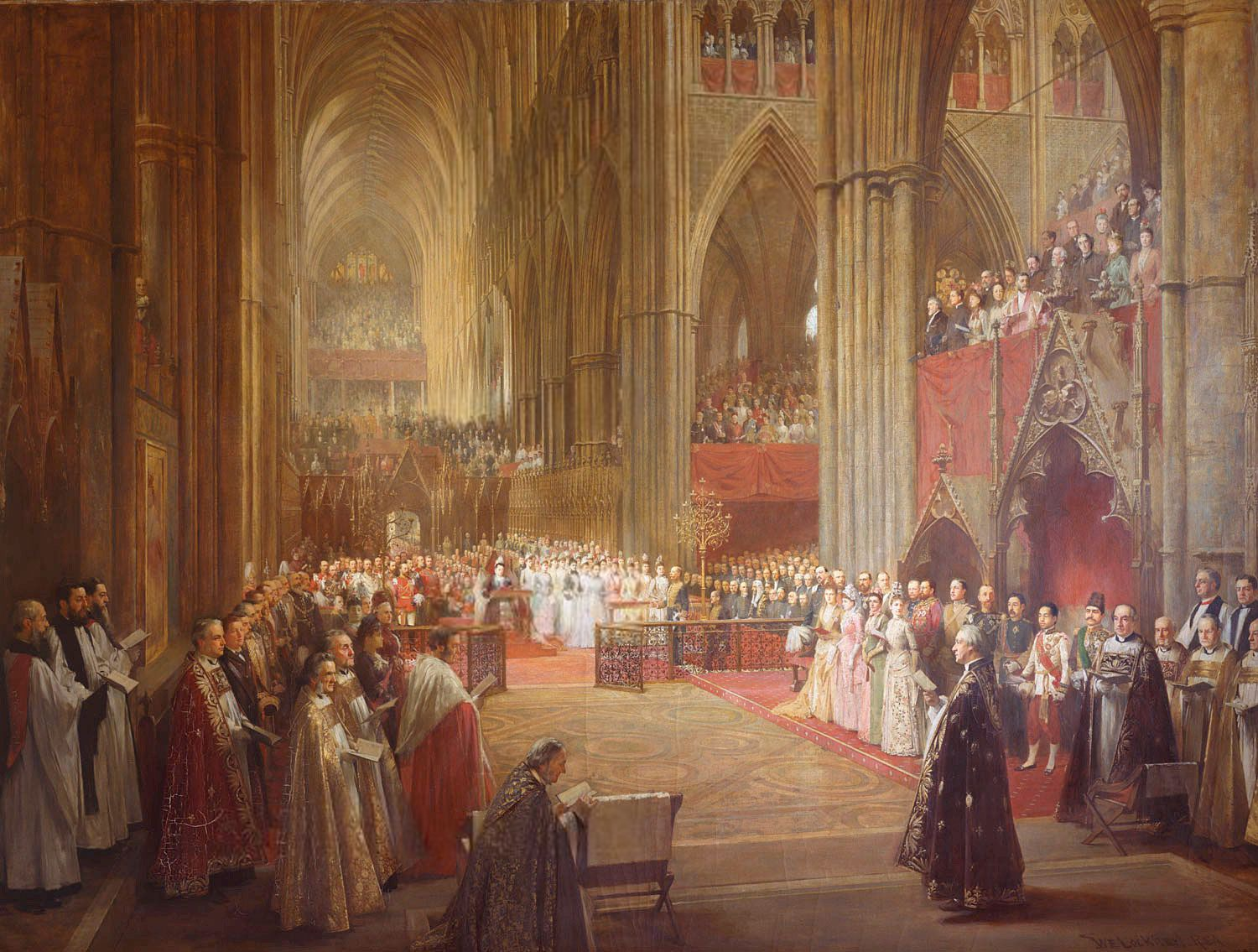
- Queen Victoria's Golden Jubilee Service, Westminster Abbey, 21 June 1887 (1887–1890) by William Ewart Lockhart
- Genre: Jubilee of British monarch
- Date: 20–21 June 1887
- Country: United Kingdom; British India; British Empire
- Previous event: Golden Jubilee of George III
- Next event: Diamond Jubilee of Queen Victoria

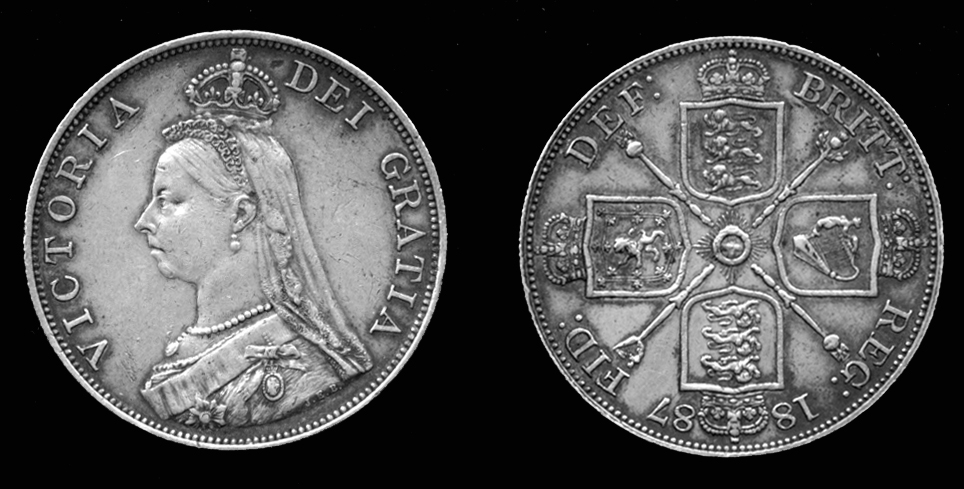
Victoria's Golden Jubilee silver double florin, struck 1887.

The Golden Jubilee of Queen Victoria was celebrated on 20 and 21 June 1887 to mark the 50th anniversary of Queen Victoria's accession on 20 June 1837. It was celebrated with a Thanksgiving Service at Westminster Abbey, and a banquet to which 50 European kings and princes were invited.

== Background ==
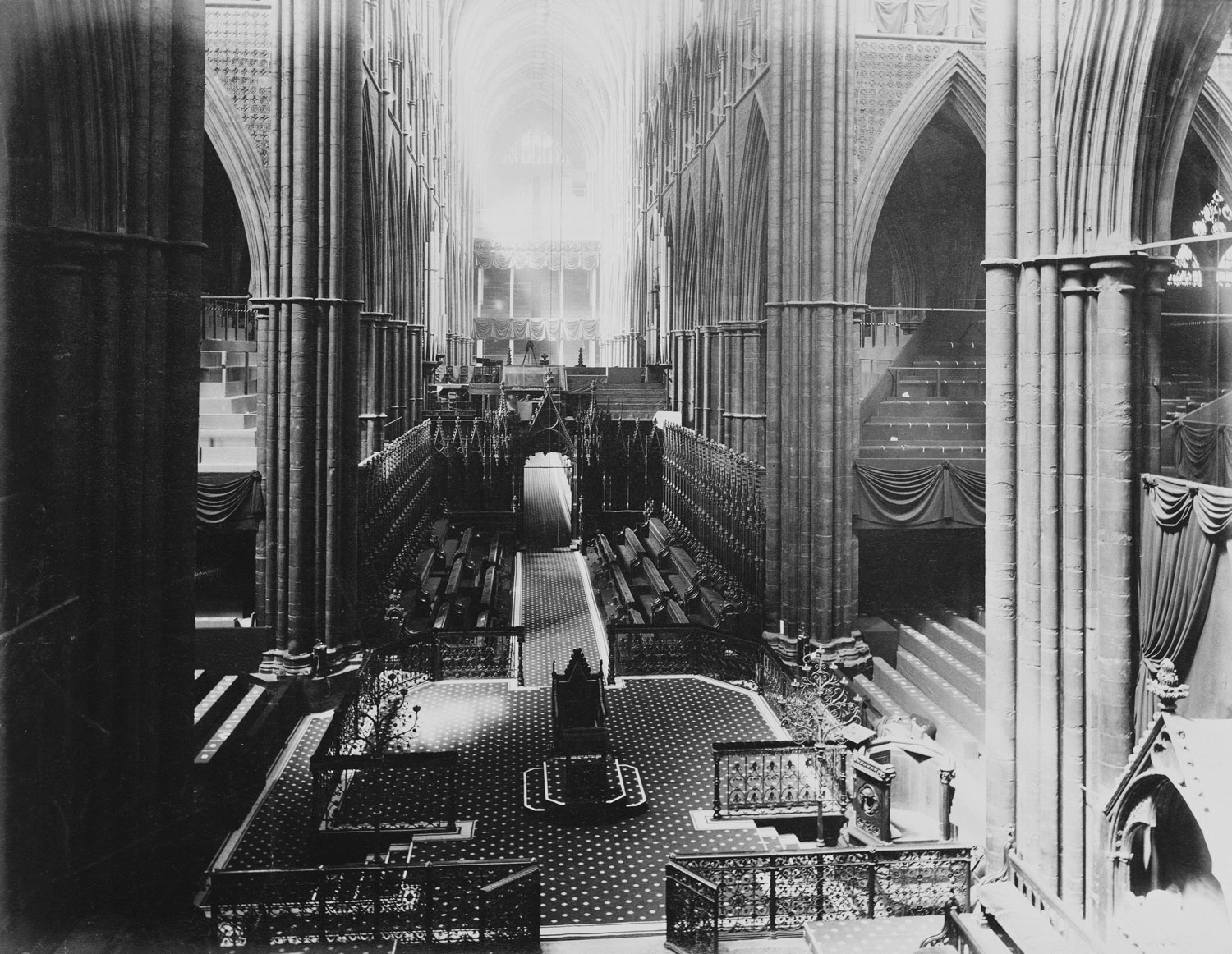
Westminster Abbey prepared for the Jubilee Service of Thanksgiving, showing the Coronation Chair on a raised dais and the temporary galleries built into the transepts. These alterations were the only part of the jubilee to be financed by the government.

As the fiftieth anniversary of Victoria's accession approached, public anticipation of national celebrations began to grow, encouraged by the Liberal politician, Lord Granville. At the previous royal jubilee, the Golden Jubilee of George III, the king had been ill at Windsor Castle, so there was little precedent to follow. In 1872, the recovery of Edward, Prince of Wales from a bout of typhoid fever was marked by Victoria processing through London to a thanksgiving service at St Paul's Cathedral; despite the queen's reluctance, this had proved to be a resounding success which had silenced the many critics of the monarchy. For the Golden Jubilee, Victoria had informed the Conservative prime minister, Lord Salisbury, that she intended to have a thanksgiving service at Westminster Abbey. Ignoring the Biblical tradition that the start of the fiftieth year should be celebrated, which George III's jubilee observed, the jubilee would mark the completion of fifty years. The service would reference Victoria's coronation, although the Queen would not wear a crown or robes of state. This entailed considerable alterations inside the Abbey, which Lord Salisbury reluctantly agreed to finance, but he insisted that the Queen underwrite the rest of the costs.

== The Queen's Jubilee message ==
On the occasion of her Golden Jubilee, Queen Victoria wrote a message of thanks to her people, which was then published in the London Gazette and national newspapers:

I am anxious to express to my people my warm thanks for the kind & more than kind reception I met with on going to, returning from Westminster Abbey, with all my Children & Grand Children. The enthusiastic reception I met with then as well as on all these eventful days in London as well as in Windsor on the occasion of my Jubilee has touched me most deeply. It has shown that the labour & anxiety of 50 long years – 22 of which I spent in unclouded happiness, shared & cheered by my beloved Husband, while an equal number were full of sorrows & trials, borne without his sheltering arm & wise help have been appreciated by my People. This feeling & the cause of duty towards my dear Country & subjects, who are so inseparably bound up with my life, will encourage me in my task often a very difficult & arduous one, during the remainder of my life. The wonderful order preserved on this occasion & the good behaviours of the enormous multitudes assembled merits my highest admiration. That God may protect & abundantly bless my Country is my fervent prayer.

== Celebrations ==
=== India ===
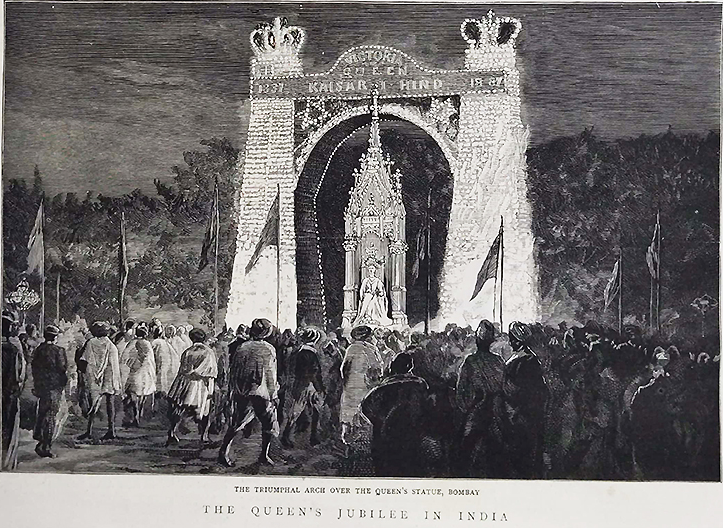
The Golden Jubilee in India; a triumphal arch over the Queen's statue in Bombay.

The first official Golden Jubilee celebrations were in the Indian Empire, and began in February to avoid the summer heat. Events took place across India on Jubilee Day, 16 February, orchestrated by the Viceroy, Lord Lytton, although his attempts to link the event with the perceived success of the British administration were mostly ignored by local rulers. A durbar in Bombay (now Mumbai) was attended by Prince Arthur, Duke of Connaught. Additionally, Victoria had a contingent of cavalry from the British Indian Army brought to London to be her personal escort, and engaged two Indian Muslims as waiters, one of whom was Abdul Karim. (Note: Karim was soon promoted to Munshi and taught her Urdu, and acted as a clerk. Her family and retainers were appalled, and accused Abdul Karim of spying for the Muslim Patriotic League, and biasing the Queen against the Hindus. Equerry Frederick Ponsonby (the son of Sir Henry) discovered that the Munshi had lied about his background, and reported to Lord Elgin, Viceroy of India, "the Munshi occupies very much the same position as John Brown used to do." Victoria dismissed their complaints as racial prejudice. Abdul Karim remained in her service until he returned to India with a pension on her death.) Invitations to the jubilee celebrations were extended to the rulers of the Indian princely states, several of whom were willing to make the lengthy journey to London.

=== 20 June ===
On 20 June 1887, the Queen had breakfast outdoors under the trees at Frogmore, where Prince Albert had been buried. She wrote in her diary:

The day has come, & I am alone, though surrounded by many dear Children. I am writing after a very fatiguing day, in the Garden at Buckingham Palace, where I used to sit so often in former happy days. 50 years ago today since I came to the throne. God has mercifully sustained me through many great trials & sorrows….

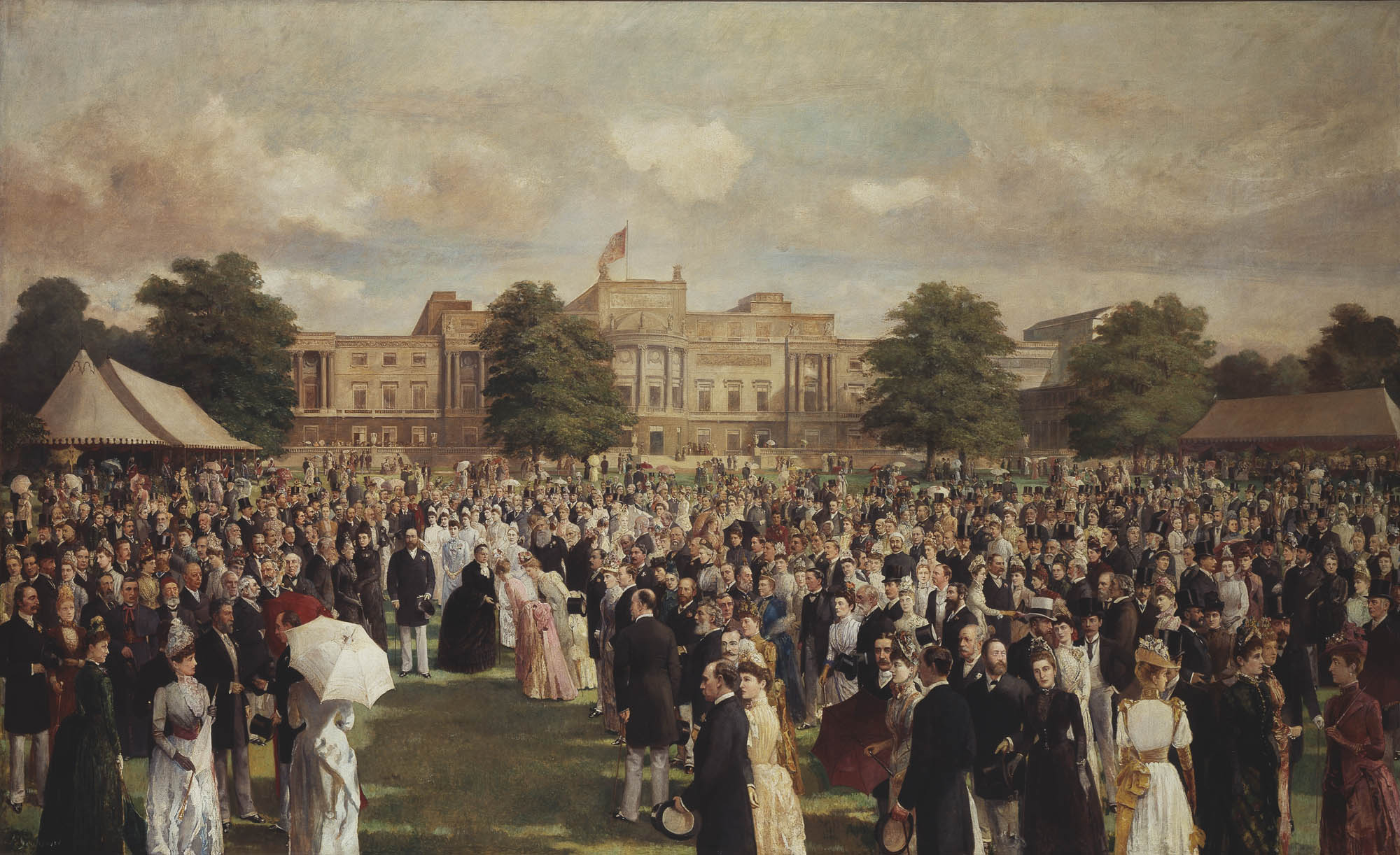
The garden party at Buckingham Palace for the Jubilee, 20 June 1887

She then travelled by train from Windsor station to Paddington then to Buckingham Palace for a lunch. In the evening, there was a banquet, which fifty foreign kings and princes, along with the governing heads of Britain's overseas colonies and dominions, attended. She wrote in her diary:

Had a large family dinner. All the Royalties assembled in the Bow Room, and we dined in the Supper-room, which looked splendid with the buffet covered with the gold plate. The table was a large horseshoe one, with many lights on it. The King of Denmark took me in, and Willy of Greece sat on my other side. The Princes were all in uniform, and the Princesses were all beautifully dressed. Afterwards we went into the Ballroom, where my band played.

=== 21 June ===
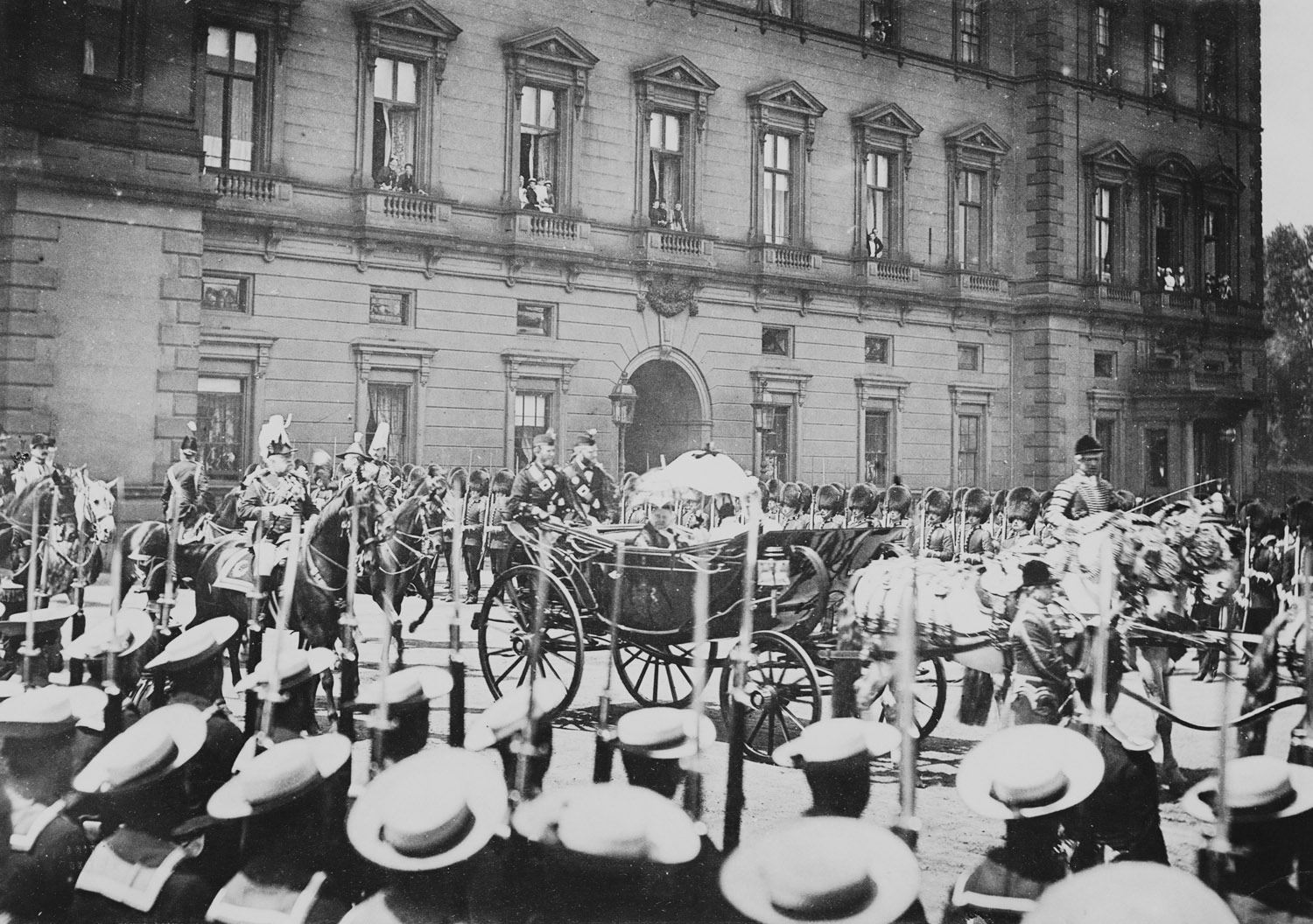
Queen Victoria leaving Buckingham Palace for Westminster Abbey, 21 June 1887

The next day, the Queen participated in a procession in an open landau, drawn by six cream-coloured horses, through London to Westminster Abbey escorted by Colonial Indian cavalry. She refused to wear a crown, wearing instead a bonnet and a long dress. The procession through London, according to Mark Twain, "stretched to the limit of sight in both directions". The spectators were accommodated on terraced benches along 10 miles of scaffolding erected for the purpose.

At Westminster Abbey, there was a Service of Thanksgiving held for the Queen's reign. The music included the singing of a Te Deum which had been composed by Prince Albert. During the service, a beam of sunlight fell upon her bowed head, which the future Queen Liliʻuokalani of Hawaiʻi observing noted as a mark of divine favour.

On her return to the palace, she went to her balcony and was cheered by the crowd. In the ballroom she distributed brooches made for the Jubilee to her family. In the evening, she put on a gown embroidered with silver roses, thistles and shamrocks and attended a banquet. Afterwards she received a procession of diplomats and Indian princes. She was then wheeled in her chair to sit and watch fireworks in the palace garden.

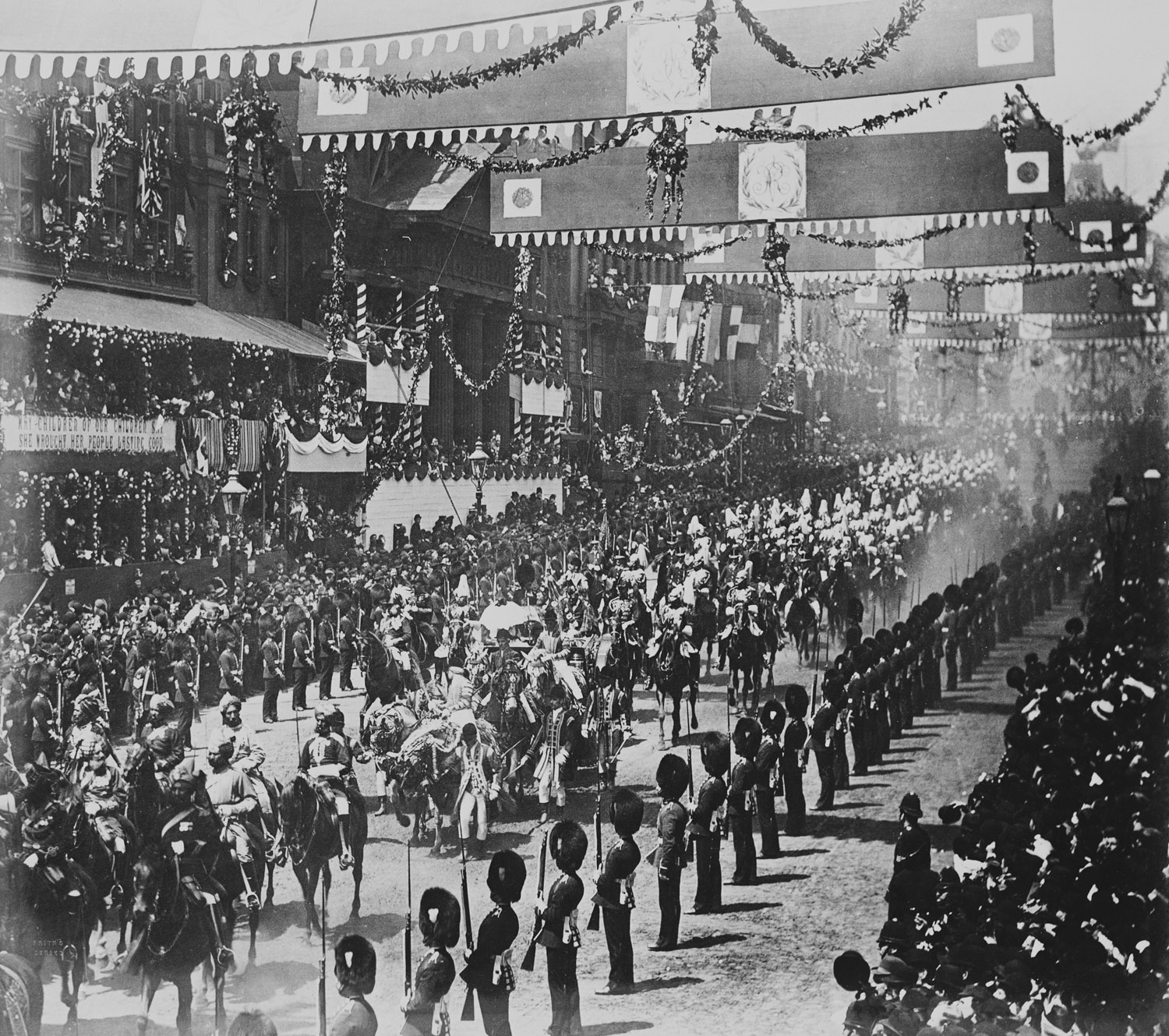
The Queen's landau processing along Regent Street, escorted by British Indian Army horsemen and the Household Cavalry.

The Queen reflected on the day in her diary:

This very eventful day has come & is passed. It will be very difficult to describe it, but all went off admirably….The morning was beautiful & bright with a fresh air. Troops began passing early, with Bands playing, & one heard constant cheering. The crowds from the Palace gates up to the Abbey were enormous, & there was such an extraordinary outburst of enthusiasm as I have hardly ever seen in London before, all the people seemed to be in such good humour. The old Chelsea Pensioners were in a stand near the Arch. The decorations along Piccadilly were quite beautiful & there were most touching inscriptions. Seats & platforms were arranged up to the tops of the houses, & such waving of hands. Piccadilly, Regent Street & Pall Mall were alike, most festively decorated. Many schools out & many well-known faces were seen…God save the Queen was played & then changed to Handel's Occasional Overture, as I was led slowly up the Nave & Choir, which looked beautiful all filled with people….I sat alone oh! without my beloved Husband (for whom this would have been such a proud day!)…The service was very well done & arranged. The "Te Deum" by my darling Albert sounded beautiful, & the anthem by Dr Bridge was fine, especially the way in which the National Anthem & dear Albert's Chorale were worked in. Dr Stainer's beautiful 'Amen' at the end of the service, was most impressive….The noise of the crowd, which began yesterday went on till late. Felt truly grateful that all had passed off so admirably & this never to be forgotten day, will always leave the most gratifying & heart stirring memoirs behind.

=== 22 June ===
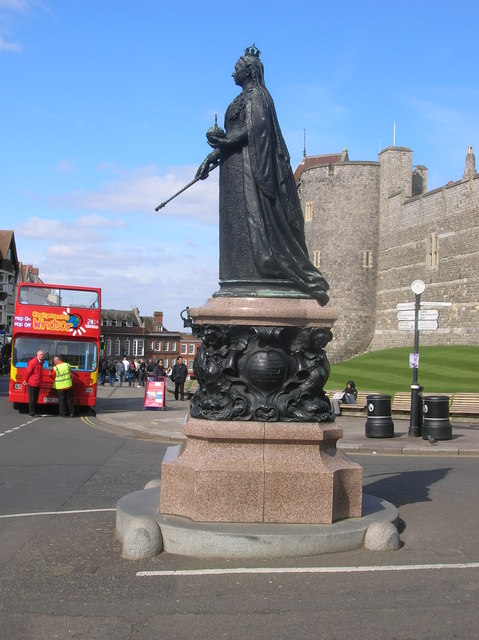
Jubilee statue of Victoria by Joseph Edgar Boehm at Castle Hill, Windsor, unveiled by the Queen on 22 June.

The next morning, Victoria went to St James's Palace to visit her elderly aunt, the Dowager Duchess of Cambridge. In the afternoon, the Queen attended a party in Hyde Park for 26,000 schoolchildren, who were all given a glass of milk, a bun and a Jubilee mug. Returning to Windsor by train, the Queen then unveiled a bronze statue of herself in Castle Hill by Sir Edgar Boehm, before viewing a torchlight procession by the schoolboys of Eton College.

=== Aldershot review ===
On 9 July, Victoria and other members of the royal family attended a Jubilee Field State Review of the British Army at Aldershot. The total number of troops participating was over 58,000; including 21,200 regular soldiers, 4,500 Militia, 270 Yeomanry and 33,000 Volunteers. The Queen, with an escort of the 10th Royal Hussars in which Prince Albert Victor was serving, received an address by the Commander-in-Chief of the Forces, Prince George, Duke of Cambridge, and then watched the entire force march past in review. Although the ground had been watered that morning by two traction engines, the passing of so many boots and hooves threw up great clouds of dust, to the annoyance of the huge crowd of spectators. Following lunch in a specially erected pavilion, the Queen returned to Windsor by train.

=== Spithead review ===
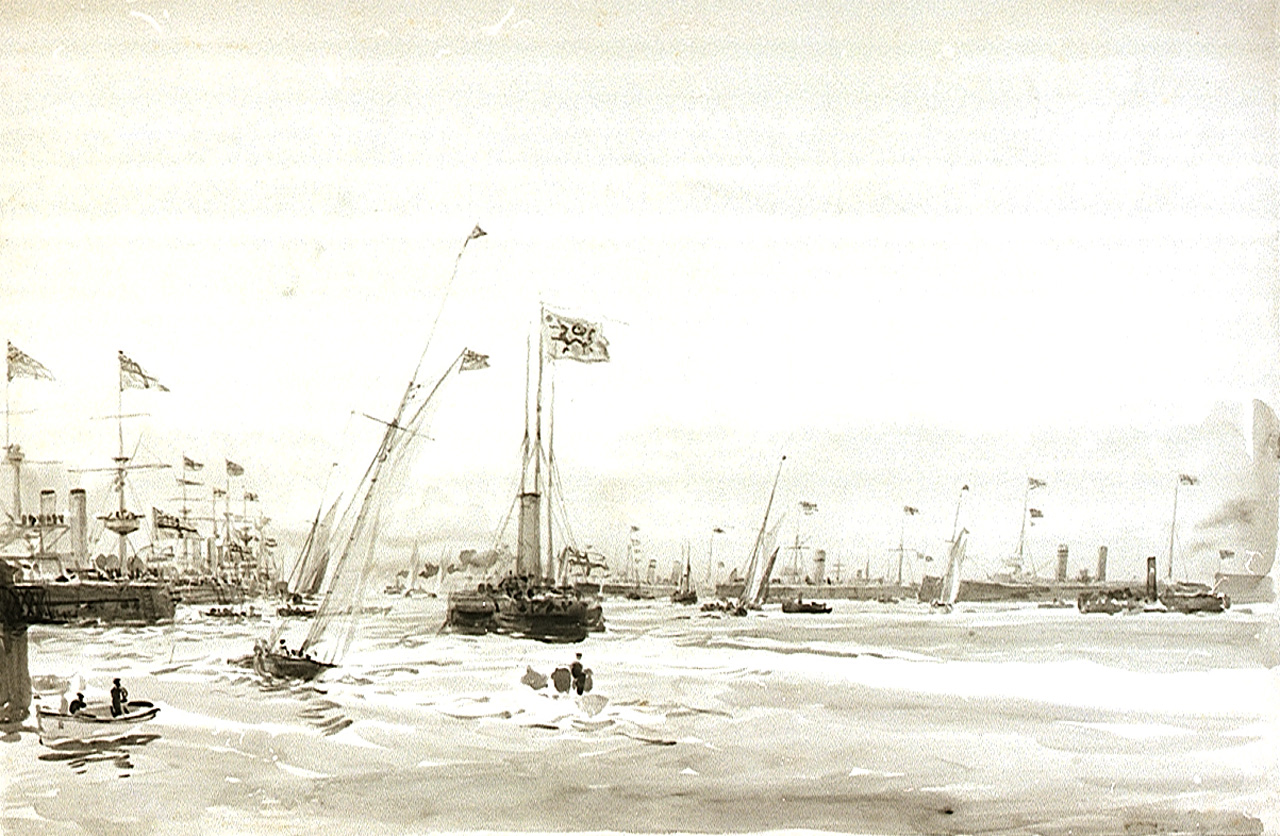
A watercolour by William Lionel Wyllie showing the royal yacht reviewing the lines of warships at the Spithead review.

On 23 July, Victoria and the royal family attended a Jubilee fleet review at Spithead offshore from Portsmouth. Present were more than one hundred Royal Navy warships and dozens of other vessels. The British fleet included 26 ironclads, 14 cruisers, 31 gunboats and 38 torpedo boats; between them these ships carried 442 guns and were manned by 16,136 officers and ratings. Also present were several foreign warships, as well as troopships, large merchant ships, yachts and numerous small craft filled with spectators. The Queen and other important guests passed along the lines of anchored ships in a flotilla led by the royal yacht, HMY Victoria and Albert. That night, the ships were illuminated by their searchlights. A report for the United States Navy described the review as "the most imposing ever seen afloat".

=== Other events ===
At the Jubilee, the Queen engaged two Indian Muslims as waiters; Mohammed Buksh and Abdul Karim.

A commemorative bust of Victoria was commissioned from the sculptor Francis John Williamson. Many copies were made, and distributed throughout the British Empire.

A special Golden Jubilee Medal was instituted and awarded to participants of the jubilee celebrations.

Writer and geographer John Francon Williams published The Jubilee Atlas of the British Empire especially to commemorate Victoria's Jubilee and her Jubilee year.

Many British towns and cities commissioned new monuments, public clocks or buildings to mark the event, including Queen's Arcade in Leeds, the Jubilee Memorial, Harrogate, the Jubilee Clock Tower, Weymouth, the Jubilee Clock Tower, Brighton and the Clock Tower, Crewe.

On 20 September 1889, using £70,000 raised to mark her Golden Jubilee, Queen Victoria issued a Royal Charter and the Queen Victoria's Jubilee Institute for Nurses was constituted.

== Gallery ==
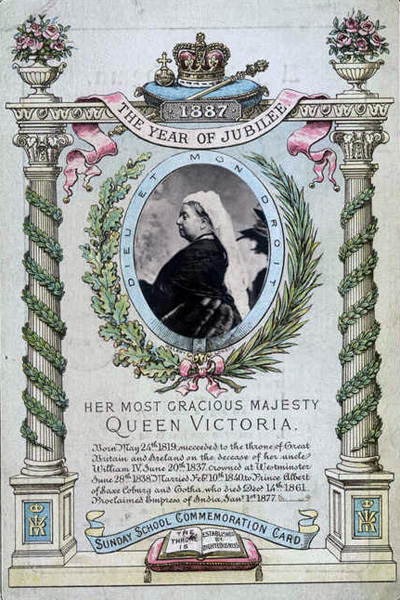
A card for the Queen's Golden Jubilee, 1887

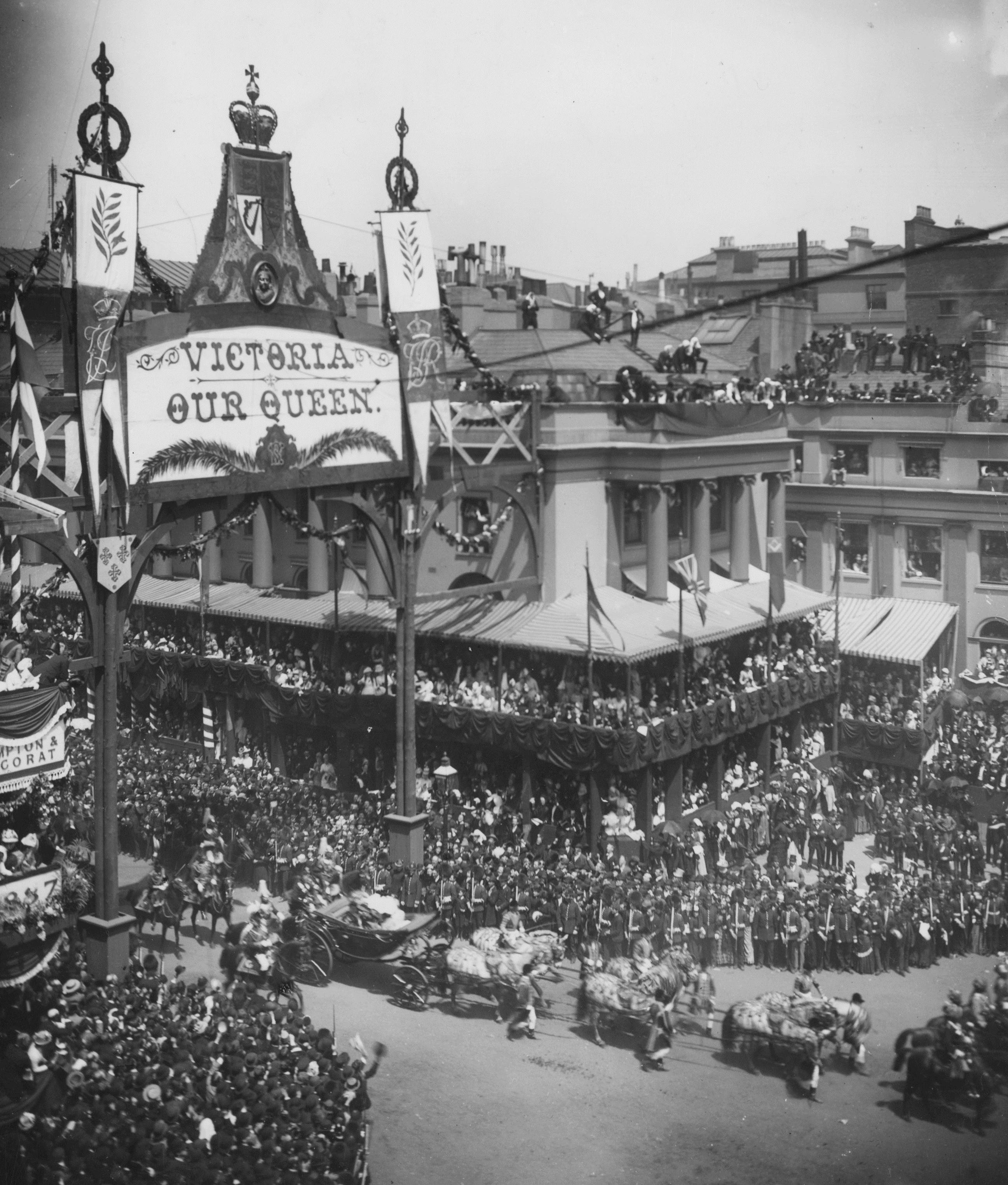
Queen Victoria's Golden Jubilee procession in Lower Regent Street, 1887

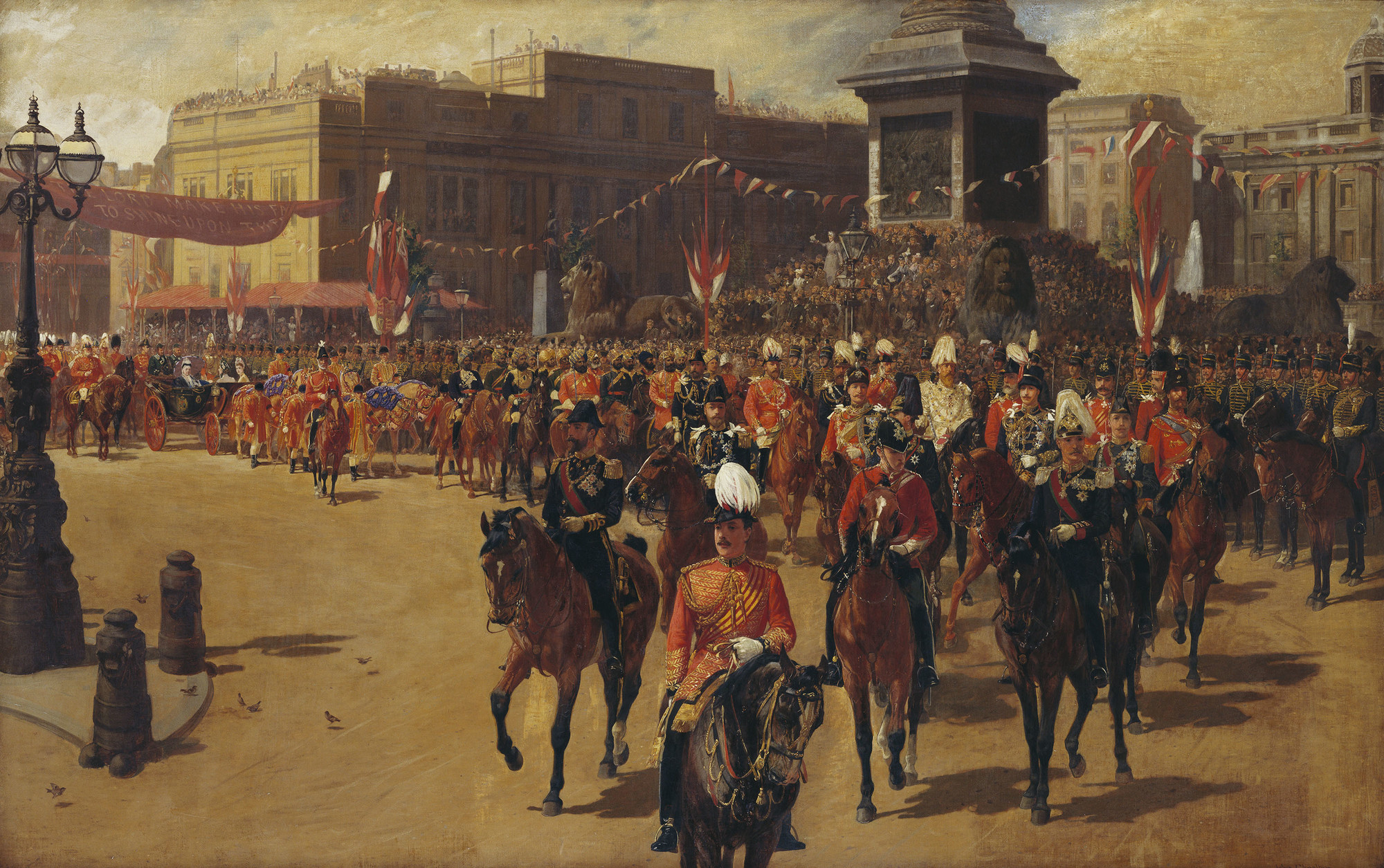
Queen Victoria's Golden Jubilee, 21 June 1887; The Royal Procession Passing Trafalgar Square by John Charlton

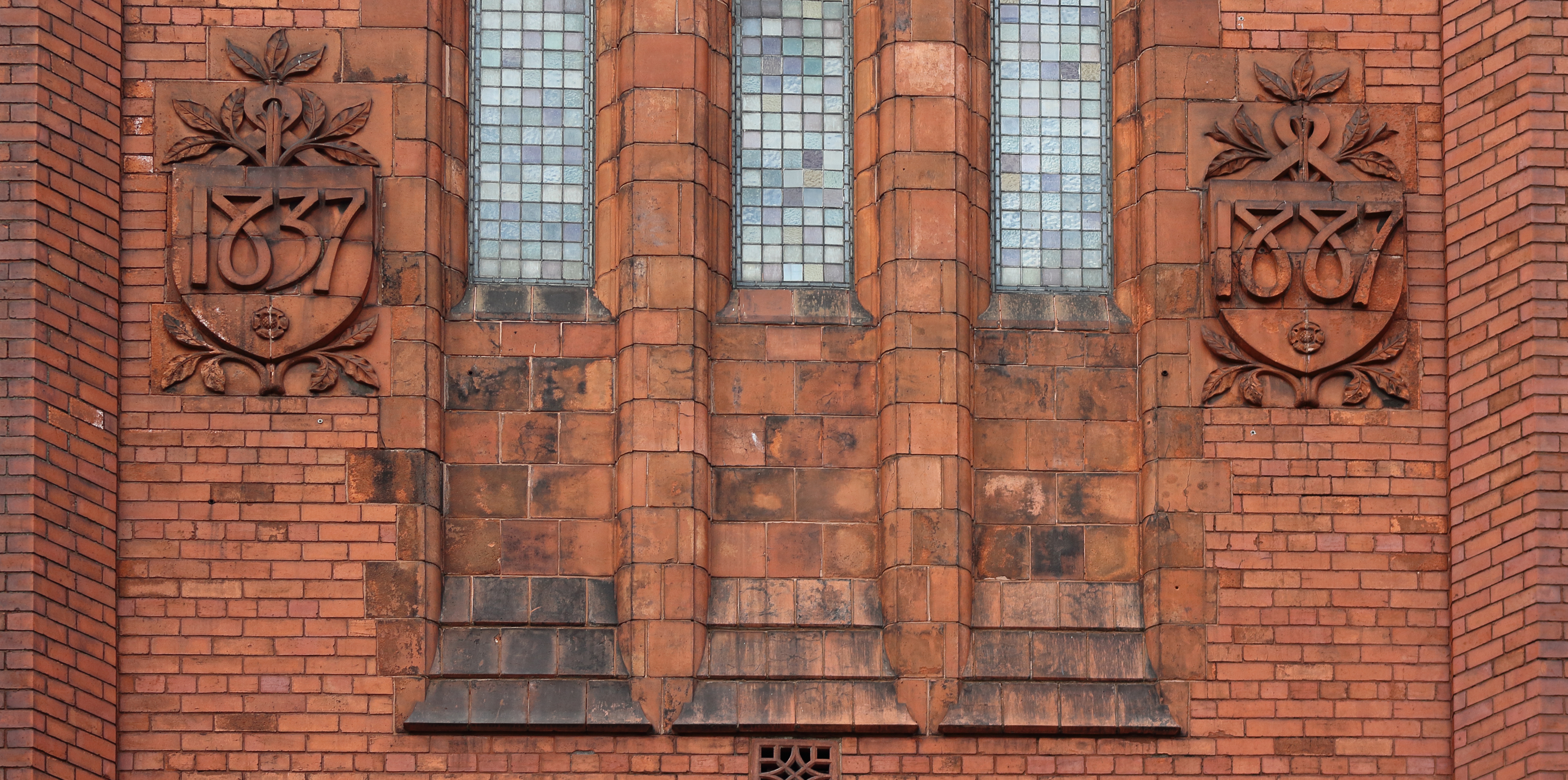
The Tower of the Victoria Building, University of Liverpool commemorates the Golden Jubilee, with terracotta dates

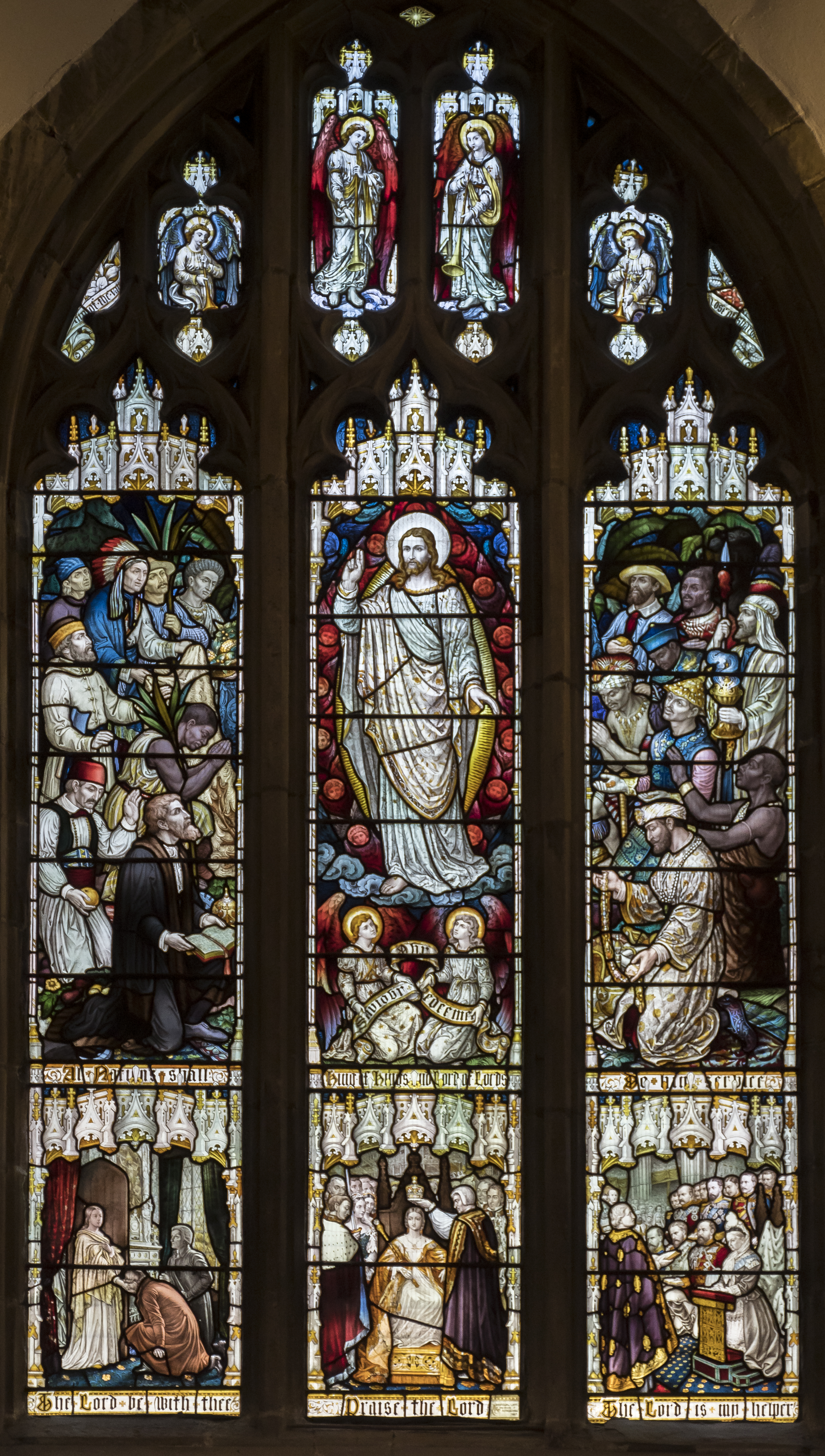
Great Malvern Priory window, commemorating the Jubilee, designed by Thomas Camm and made under the auspices of R. W. Winfield & Co

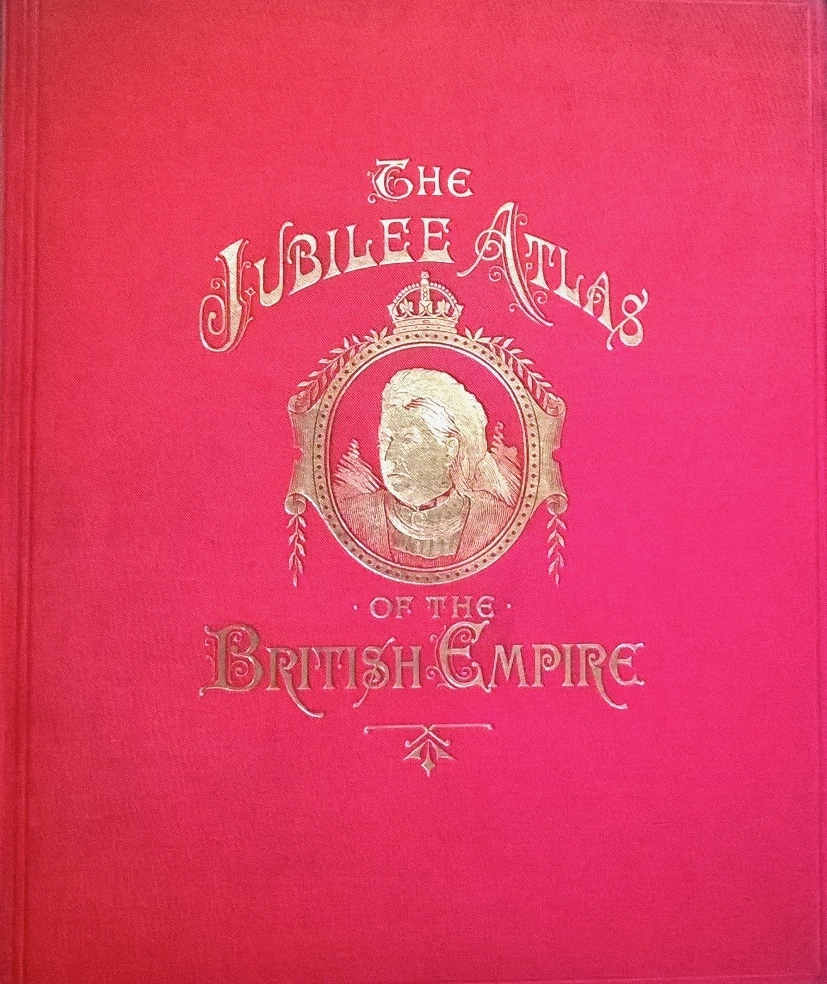
The Jubilee Atlas of the British Empire by John Francon Williams

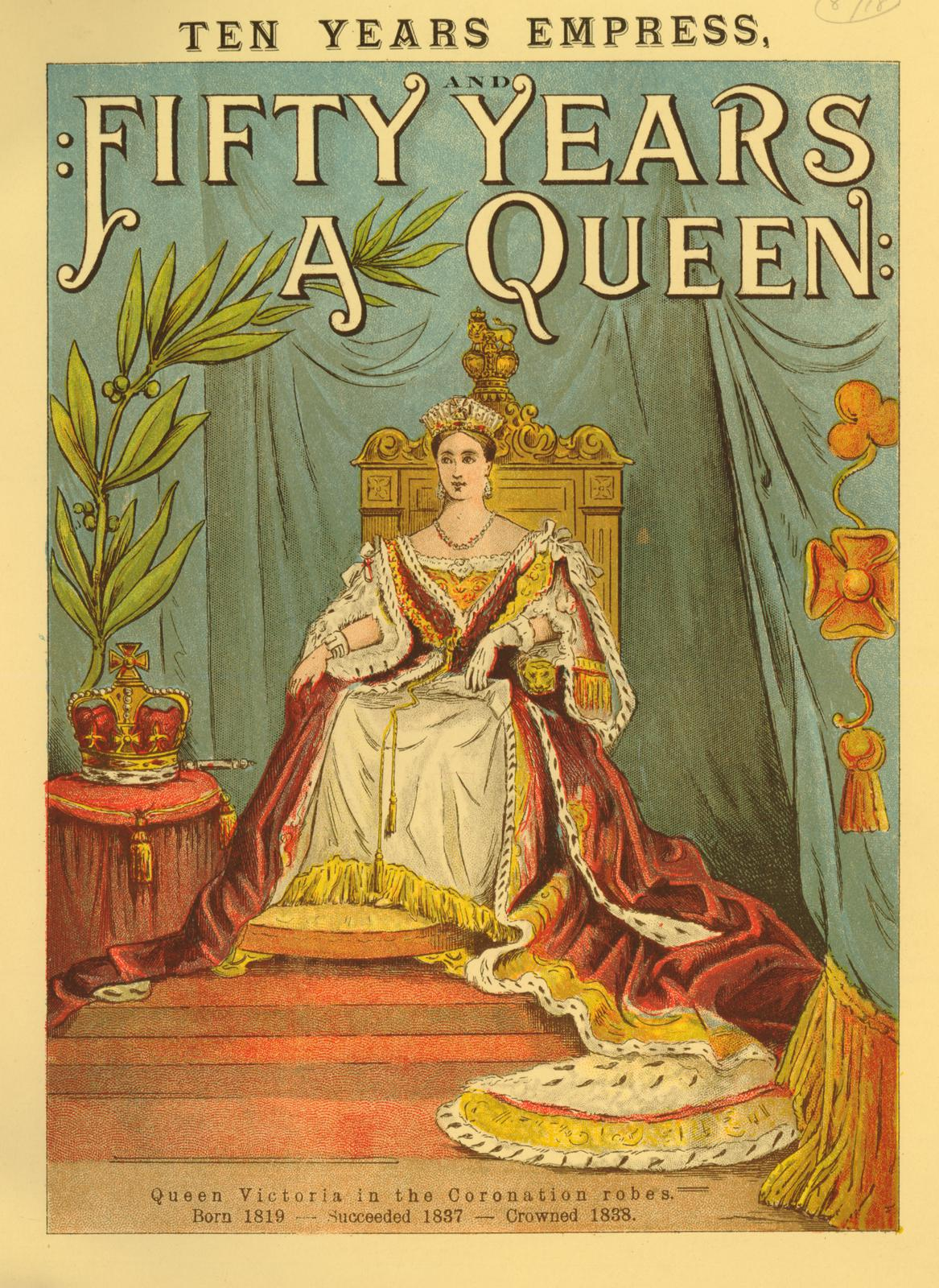
Ten years Empress and fifty years a Queen published to mark the Queen's Golden Jubilee, 1887

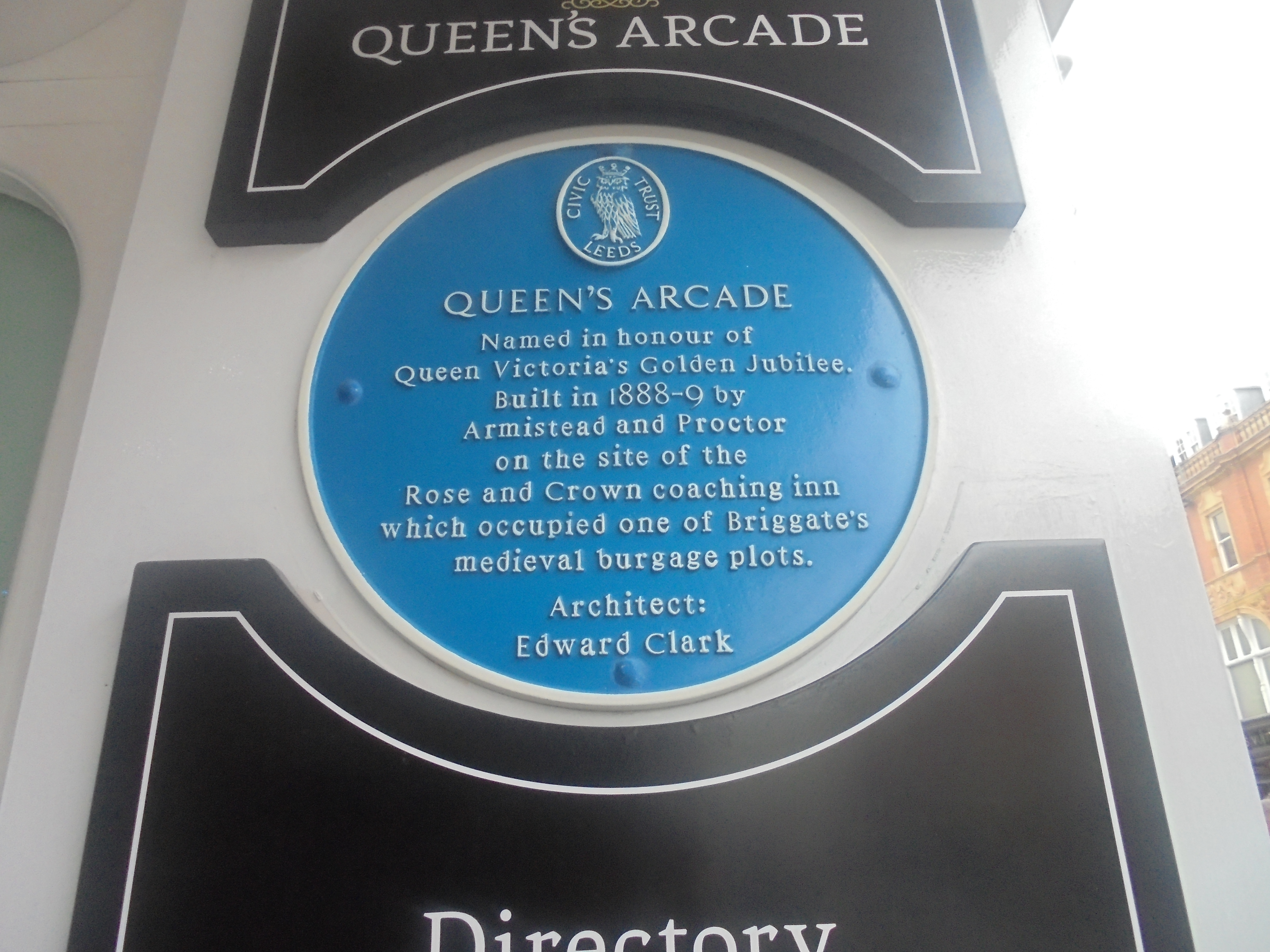
Queen's Arcade was named in honour of Queen Victoria's Golden Jubilee

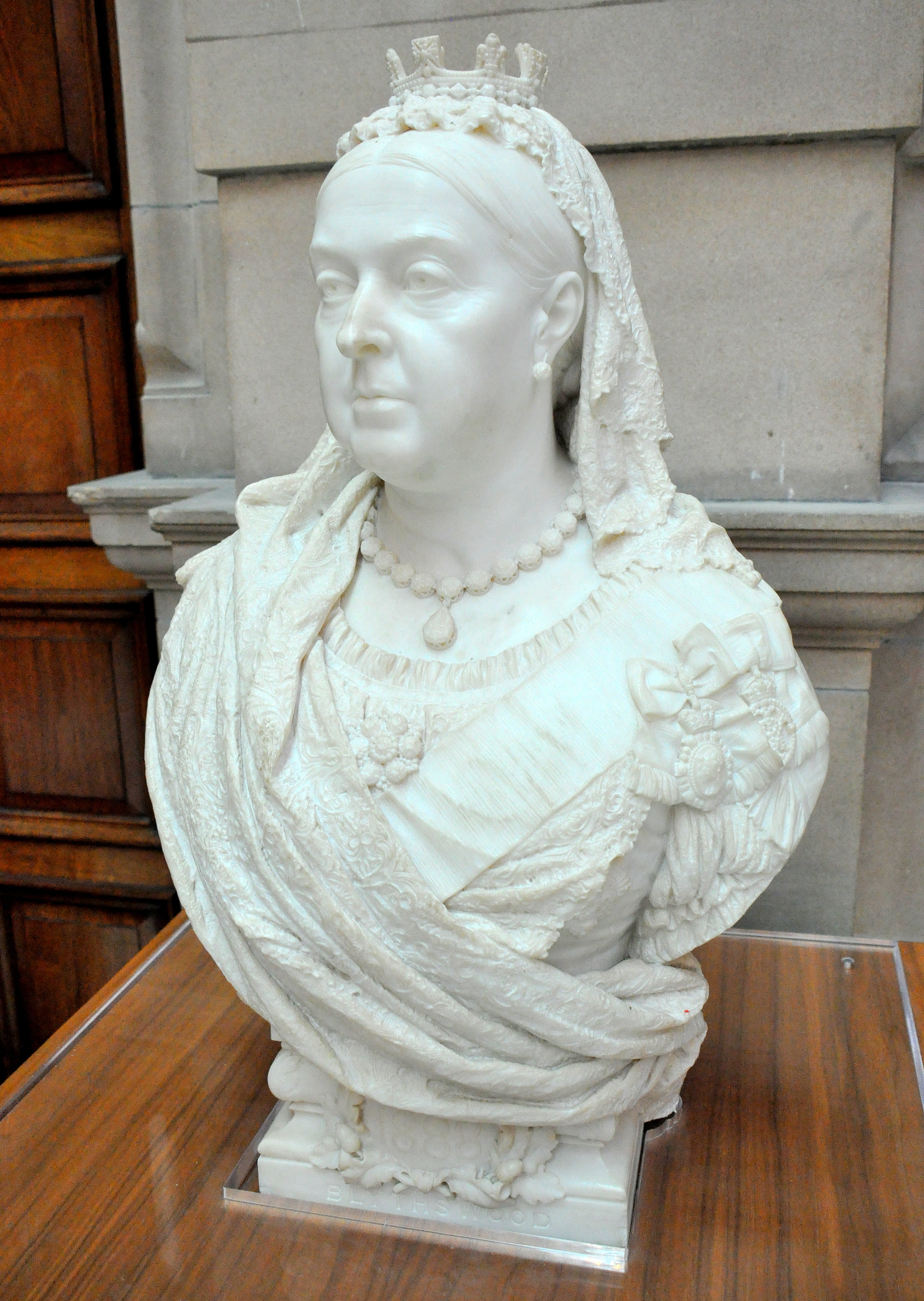
Jubilee bust of Queen Victoria by Francis John Williamson, 1887

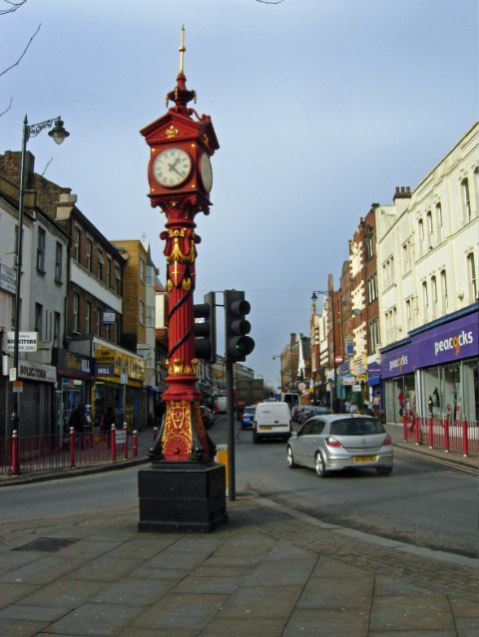
The Golden Jubilee Clock in Harlesden, Greater London

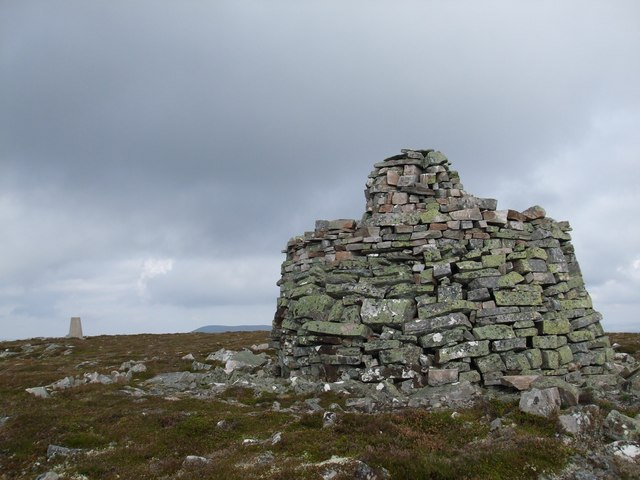
Jubilee cairn on the summit of Creagan a' Chaise, Moray, Scotland

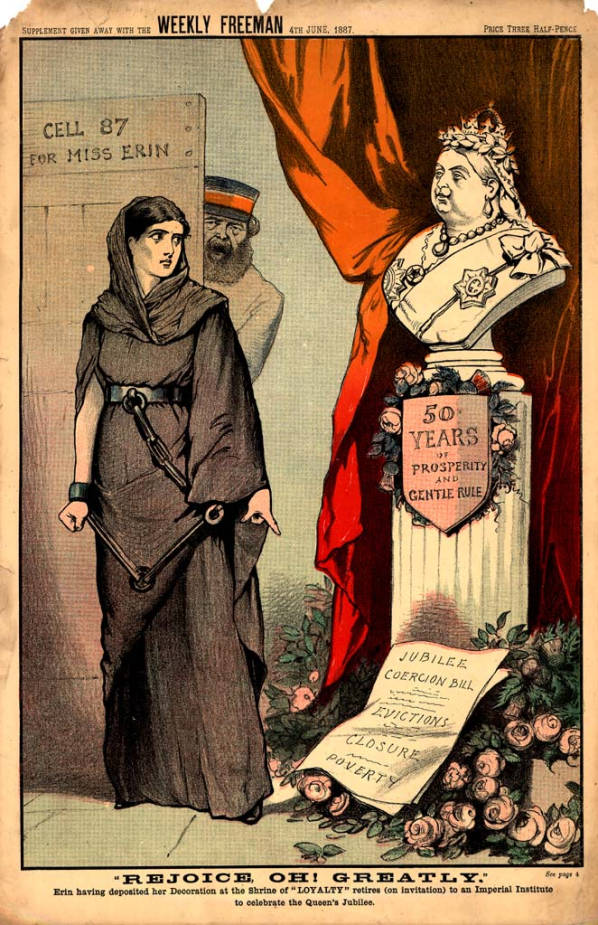
A political cartoon by Irish cartoonist John Fergus O'Hea criticising Victoria for celebrating the Jubilee while failing to address issues such as evictions and general poverty in Ireland.

== Royal guests at the Jubilee celebrations ==
=== British royal family ===
- The Queen
  - (German Empire) The German Crown Princess and Crown Prince, the Queen's daughter and son-in-law (representing the German Emperor)
    - (Kingdom of Prussia) Prince and Princess Wilhelm of Prussia, the Queen's grandson and granddaughter-in-law
    - The Hereditary Princess and Hereditary Prince of Saxe-Meiningen, the Queen's granddaughter and grandson-in-law (representing the Duke of Saxe-Meiningen)
      - Princess Feodora of Saxe-Meiningen, the Queen's great-granddaughter
    - (Kingdom of Prussia) Prince Henry of Prussia, the Queen's grandson
    - (Kingdom of Prussia) Princess Viktoria of Prussia, the Queen's granddaughter
    - (Kingdom of Prussia) Princess Sophia of Prussia, the Queen's granddaughter
    - (Kingdom of Prussia) Princess Margaret of Prussia, the Queen's granddaughter
  - The Prince and Princess of Wales, the Queen's son and daughter-in-law
    - Prince Albert Victor of Wales, the Queen's grandson
    - Prince George of Wales, the Queen's grandson
    - Princess Louise of Wales, the Queen's granddaughter
    - Princess Victoria of Wales, the Queen's granddaughter
    - Princess Maud of Wales, the Queen's granddaughter
  - (Grand Duchy of Hesse) The Grand Duke of Hesse and by Rhine, the Queen's son-in-law
    - Princess and Prince Louis of Battenberg, the Queen's granddaughter and grandson-in-law
    - (Russian Empire) Grand Duchess Elizabeth Feodorovna and Grand Duke Sergei Alexandrovich of Russia, the Queen's granddaughter and grandson-in-law (representing the Emperor of Russia)
    - (Grand Duchy of Hesse) Princess Irene of Hesse and by Rhine, the Queen's granddaughter
    - (Grand Duchy of Hesse) The Hereditary Grand Duke of Hesse and by Rhine, the Queen's grandson
    - (Grand Duchy of Hesse) Princess Alix of Hesse and by Rhine, the Queen's granddaughter
  - The Duke and Duchess of Edinburgh, the Queen's son and daughter-in-law
    - Prince Alfred of Edinburgh, the Queen's grandson
    - Princess Marie of Edinburgh, the Queen's granddaughter
    - Princess Victoria Melita of Edinburgh, the Queen's granddaughter
    - Princess Alexandra of Edinburgh, the Queen's granddaughter
  - Princess and Prince Christian of Schleswig-Holstein, the Queen's daughter and son-in-law
    - Prince Christian Victor of Schleswig-Holstein, the Queen's grandson
    - Prince Albert of Schleswig-Holstein, the Queen's grandson
    - Princess Helena Victoria of Schleswig-Holstein, the Queen's granddaughter
    - Princess Marie Louise of Schleswig-Holstein, the Queen's granddaughter
  - The Princess Louise, Marchioness of Lorne and Marquess of Lorne, the Queen's daughter and son-in-law
  - The Duke and Duchess of Connaught and Strathearn, the Queen's son and daughter-in-law
    - Princess Margaret of Connaught, the Queen's granddaughter
    - Prince Arthur of Connaught, the Queen's grandson
  - The Duchess of Albany, the Queen's daughter-in-law
  - Princess and Prince Henry of Battenberg, the Queen's daughter and son-in-law
    - Prince Alexander of Battenberg, the Queen's grandson

Other descendants of the Queen's paternal grandfather, King George III and their families:

- The Duke of Cambridge, the Queen's first cousin
  - George FitzGeorge, the Queen's first cousin once removed
  - Augustus FitzGeorge, the Queen's first cousin once removed
- (Grand Duchy of Mecklenburg-Strelitz) The Grand Duchess and Grand Duke of Mecklenburg-Strelitz, the Queen's first cousin and her husband
  - (Grand Duchy of Mecklenburg-Strelitz) The Hereditary Grand Duke and Hereditary Grand Duchess of Mecklenburg-Strelitz, the Queen's first cousin once removed and his wife
- The Duchess and Duke of Teck, the Queen's first cousin and her husband
  - Princess Victoria Mary of Teck, the Queen's first cousin once removed
  - Prince Adolphus of Teck, the Queen's first cousin once removed
  - Prince Francis of Teck, the Queen's first cousin once removed
  - Prince Alexander of Teck, the Queen's first cousin once removed
- Princess Frederica of Hanover and Baron Alphons von Pawel-Rammingen, the Queen's first cousin once removed and her husband
- The Hon. Aubrey FitzClarence, the Queen's first cousin twice removed (and great-grandson of King William IV)

=== Foreign royals ===
- Ernst, Prince of Leiningen and Marie, Princess of Leiningen, the Queen's half-nephew and half-niece-in-law
  - Princess Alberta of Leiningen, the Queen's half-great-niece
- Hermann, Prince of Hohenlohe-Langenburg, the Queen's half-nephew
- Victor, Prince of Hohenlohe-Langenburg and Princess Victor of Hohenlohe-Langenburg, the Queen's half-nephew and half-niece-in-law
  - Countess Feodora Gleichen, the Queen's half-great-niece
  - Count Edward Gleichen, the Queen's half-great-nephew
  - Countess Valda Gleichen, the Queen's half-great-niece
- Ernst, Prince of Saxe-Meiningen, the Queen's half-great-nephew
- Ernest II of Saxe-Coburg and Gotha, the Queen's brother-in-law and first cousin
- Leopold II of Belgium and Marie Henriette, Queen of the Belgians, the Queen's first cousin and his wife
  - Princess Louise of Belgium and Prince Philipp of Saxe-Coburg and Gotha, the Queen's first cousins once removed
- (Austria-Hungary) Rudolf, Crown Prince of Austria, husband of the Queen's first cousin once removed (representing the Emperor of Austria)
- (Kingdom of Portugal) Carlos, Prince Royal and Amélie, Princess Royal of Portugal, the Queen's first cousin twice removed and his wife (representing the King of Portugal)
- Christian IX of Denmark, father of the Princess of Wales
  - (Kingdom of Greece) George I of Greece, brother of the Princess of Wales
    - (Kingdom of Greece) Constantine, Duke of Sparta, nephew of the Princess of Wales
    - (Kingdom of Greece) Prince George of Greece and Denmark, nephew of the Princess of Wales
- (Grand Duchy of Baden) Prince Louis of Baden, nephew of the German Crown Prince (representing the Grand Duke of Baden)
- Gustav, Crown Prince of Sweden and Norway, nephew-in-law of the German Crown Prince (representing the King of Sweden and Norway)
- (Kingdom of Saxony) Albert, King of Saxony
- (Kingdom of Italy) Amedeo, Duke of Aosta (representing the King of Italy)
- (Restoration (Spain)) Infante Antonio and Infanta Eulalia of Spain (representing the Queen Regent of Spain)
- (Hawaiian Kingdom) Queen Kapiʻolani
- (Hawaiian Kingdom) Princess Liliʻuokalani (sister and heir apparent of King Kalākaua)
- Prince Ludwig of Bavaria (representing the Prince Regent of Bavaria)
- Charles Augustus, Hereditary Grand Duke of Saxe-Weimar-Eisenach (representing the Grand Duke of Saxe-Weimar-Eisenach)
- (Saxe-Weimar-Eisenach) Prince and Princess Edward of Saxe-Weimar
- Prince Hermann of Saxe-Weimar-Eisenach
- (Empire of Japan) Prince Komatsu Akihito (representing the Emperor of Japan)
- (Thailand) Prince Devawongse Varoprakar (representing the King of Siam)
- (Qajar Iran) Prince Abu 'n Nasr Mirza Hissam us Sultaneh of Persia (representing the Shah of Persia)
- (Duchy of Anhalt) Frederick, Hereditary Prince of Anhalt (representing the Duke of Anhalt)
- (Hyderabad State) Nawab Sir Asman Jah representing Asaf Jah VI Mahboob Ali Khan, Nizam of Hyderabad and Berar.
- Bhagvat Singh, Maharaja of Gondal
- The Thakore Sahib of Liinri
- The Thakore Sahib of Morvi
- Nripendra Narayan, Maharaja of Cooch Behar and Suniti Devi, Maharani of Cooch Behar
- Lakshmeshwar Singh, The Maharajah of Darbhanga
- Khengarji III, Maharaja of Kutch
- Shivajirao Holkar, Maharaja Holkar of Indore
- Prince Philippe, Count of Paris and Princess Marie Isabelle of Orléans, Countess of Paris
  - Prince Philippe, Duke of Orléans
  - Princess Hélène of Orléans
- Prince Robert, Duke of Chartres
  - Prince Henri of Orléans
  - Princess Marguerite of Orléans
- Henri d'Orléans, Duke of Aumale

== Other notable guests ==
- Mildred Childe Lee

== See also ==
- Queen Victoria Golden Jubilee Medal
- 1887 Golden Jubilee Honours
- Jubilee Plot

== Bibliography ==
- Chapman, Caroline; Raben, Paul (1977). Queen Victoria's Jubilees 1887 & 1897. London: Debrett's Peerage Ltd. ISBN 978-0670584178.
- Hibbert, Christopher (2000) Queen Victoria: A Personal History, London: HarperCollins, ISBN 0-00-638843-4
- St Aubyn, Giles (1991) Queen Victoria: A Portrait, London: Sinclair-Stevenson, ISBN 1-85619-086-2
- Taylor, Miles (2022). Empress: Queen Victoria and India. New Haven, CT: Yale University Press. ISBN 9780300118094.
- Waller, Maureen (2006) Sovereign Ladies: The Six Reigning Queens of England, London: John Murray, ISBN 0-7195-6628-2
- Woolerton, June (2022). A History of British Royal Jubilees. Barnsley, South Yorkshire: Pen & Sword History. ISBN 978-1399062763.
