= Thomas Edgar Underhill =

English physician

Thomas Edgar Underhill FRSE FRCSE
- Underhill in 1902
- Born: 1854; Tipton, Staffordshire, England
- Died: 8 May 1917 (aged 62–63)
- Education: University of Edinburgh (MB ChB)
- Occupations: Physician, surgeon
- Spouse: Mary Isabel Charlton
- Children: At least 14
- Relatives: Charles Edward Underhill Thomas Pretious Heslop

Thomas Edgar Underhill FRSE FRCSE (1854 – 8 May 1917) was a 19th/20th century English physician and surgeon. He was an expert on Gorham's disease and spontaneous fractures.

== Life ==
He was born in Tipton in Staffordshire, the youngest son of Emily Margaretta Roe and her husband, Dr William Lees Underhill (1814-1894).

He studied medicine at the University of Edinburgh graduating with an MB ChB in 1876. He then joined his father as a general practitioner in Tipton before spending 27 years at Barnt Green near Bromsgrove. He lived at "Dunedin" in Barnt Green, named in homage to his alma mater.

He was elected a Fellow of the Royal Society of Edinburgh in 1889. His proposers were James Matthews Duncan, Sir John Macdonald, Lord Kingsburgh, Peter Guthrie Tait and Sir German Sims Woodhead.

He was President of the Birmingham Medical Mission and President of the Birmingham branch of the British Medical Association and of the Midland Medical Society.

Underhill died on 8 May 1917.

== Family ==
He was married to Mary Isabel Charlton (b.1857) and together they had at least 14 children.

He was brother to Charles Edward Underhill.

== Publications ==
- Spontaneous Fractures (1886)
