= Charles Underhill =

Charles Underhill may refer to:

- Charles L. Underhill (1867–1946), U.S. Representative and anti-suffrage activist
- Charles Edward Underhill (1845–1908), Scottish physician and sportsman
