= Jubilee bust of Queen Victoria =

Bust of Queen Victoria by Francis John Williamson

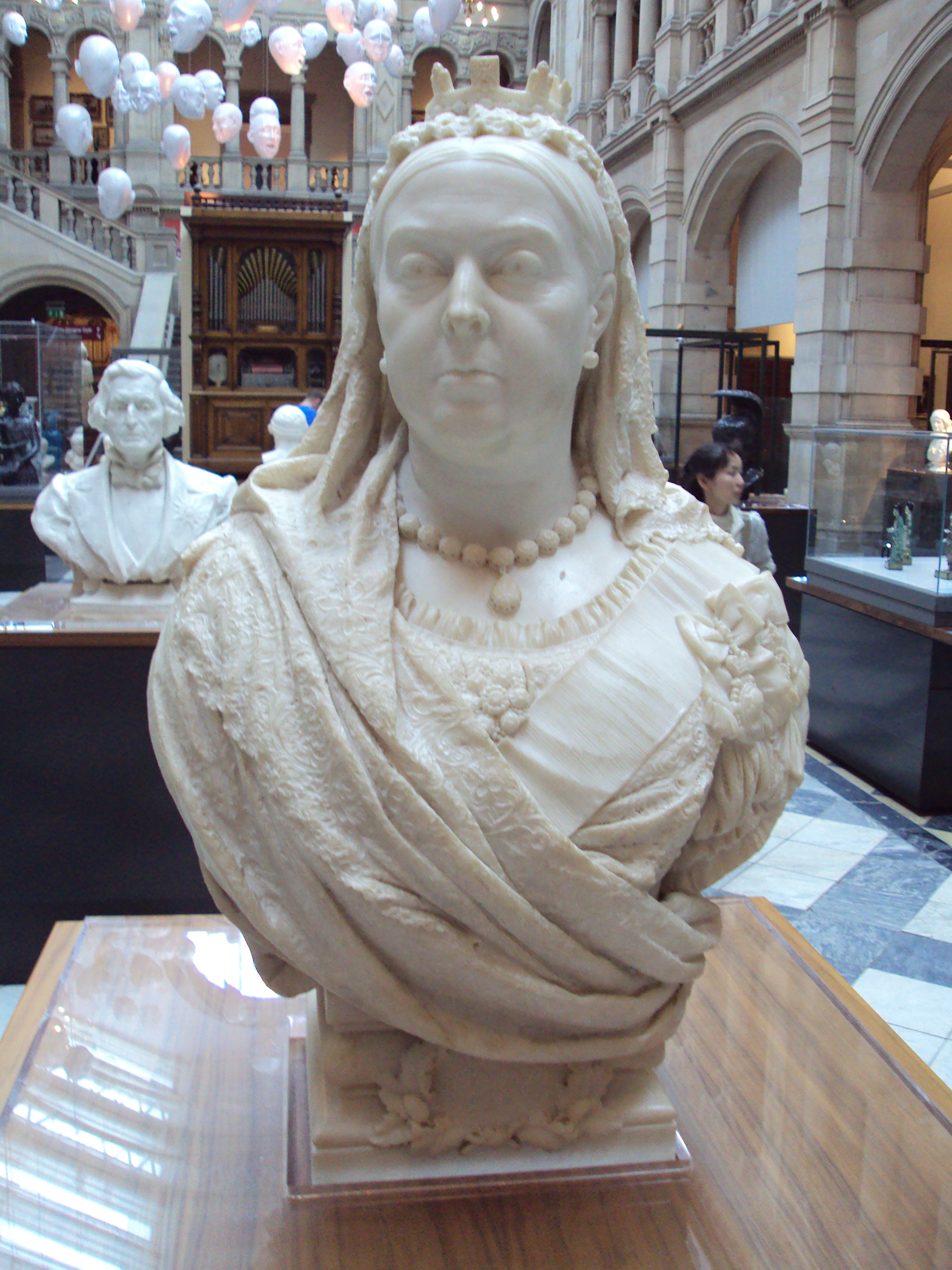
- Artist: Francis John Williamson
- Year: 1887
- Type: Bust
- Subject: Queen Victoria

The Jubilee bust of Queen Victoria is a sculpted bust of Queen Victoria, made as an official commemoration of her 1887 golden jubilee by the sculptor Francis John Williamson. Many copies were made, and distributed throughout the British Empire.

Many other busts of Victoria were carved, including others commemorating her golden and other jubilees, and these should not be confused with the Williamson Jubilee bust.
