= Thomas Pretious Heslop =

British physician

Thomas Pretious Heslop FRCP
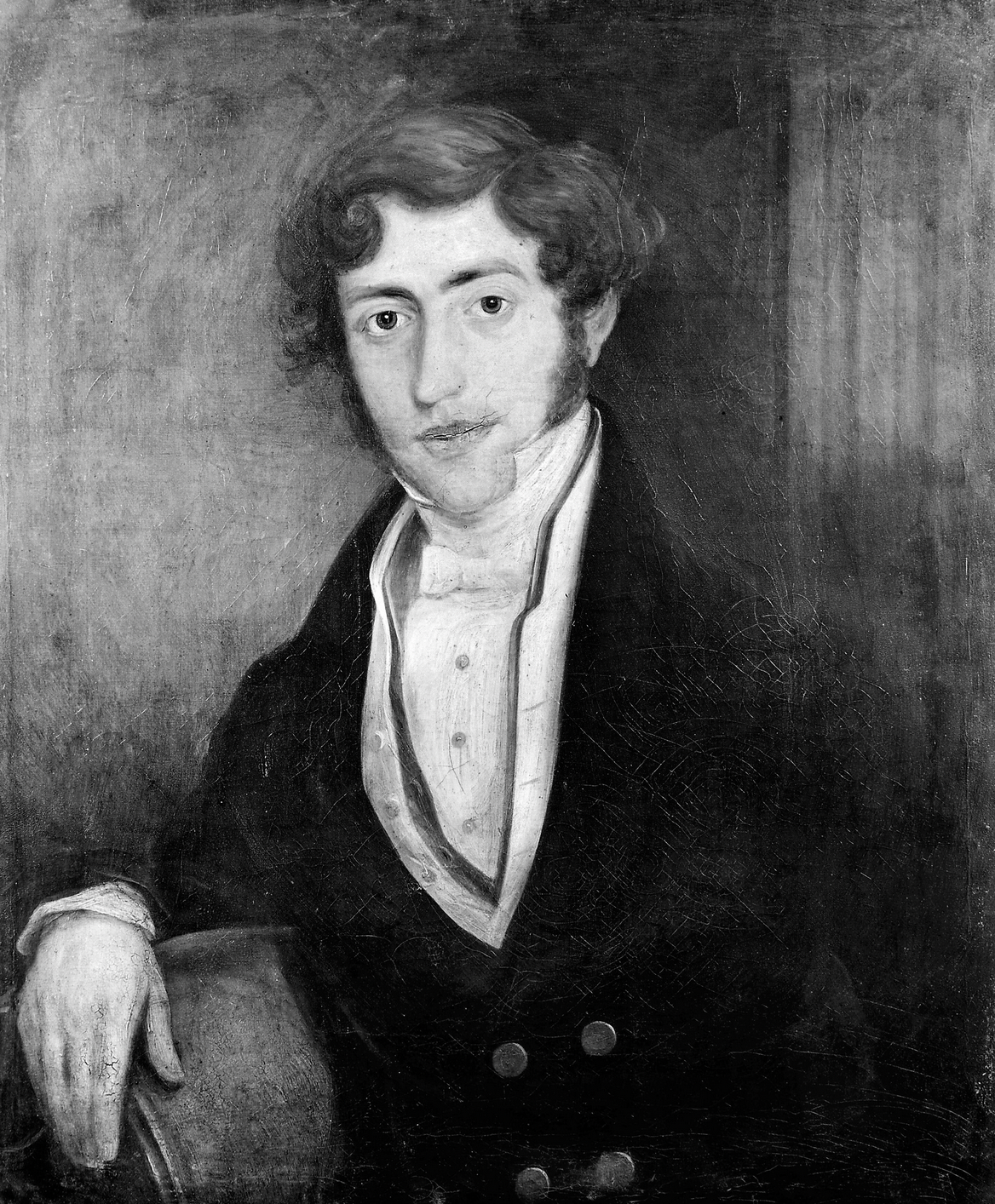
- Born: 7 November 1823; West Indies
- Died: 17 June 1885 (aged 61); Devil's Elbow, near Braemar, Scotland
- Education: University of Dublin, University of Edinburgh (M.D.)
- Occupations: Physician, philanthropist, Professor of Physiology
- Years active: c. 1848–1885
- Known for: founder of the Free Hospital for Children, Birmingham; The Women's Hospital, Birmingham; and the Skin and Lock Hospital, Birmingham
- Relatives: Charles Edward Underhill, Thomas Edgar Underhill
- Medical career
- Awards: Heslop Gold Medal and the Heslop Scholarship

Thomas Pretious Heslop FRCP (7 November 1823 – 17 June 1885) was a nineteenth-century social reformer, philanthropist and physician and founder of several hospitals in Birmingham where he spent most of his professional career. Heslop was also Professor of Physiology at Queen's College, Birmingham.

== Biography ==
=== Early life ===
Thomas Pretious Heslop was born in the West Indies in 1823 while his Scottish father, Captain Richard Braddyll Heslop, was on a posting with the 60th Rifles. His mother, Sarah Owen, was the daughter of Jacob Owen and Mary Underhill, though whom Heslop was connected to a large and well known medical family from Staffordshire. His Underhill cousins include fellow physicians Charles Edward Underhill, and Thomas Edgar Underhill. Heslop was apprenticed to his grandmother's brother, Thomas Underhill, M.D. of Tipton, Staffordshire (also grandfather to Charles and Thomas Underhill) by whom he was prepared for his medical education.

=== Education and early career ===
While studying medicine in Ireland, Heslop came under the tutelage of Professor William Stokes and gained clinical experience at Meath Hospital. From Ireland, Heslop moved to Scotland where he graduated M.D.in 1848. After briefly working in the Royal Edinburgh Infirmary, Heslop moved to Birmingham in 1848 where he spent the rest of his medical career.

=== Birmingham years ===
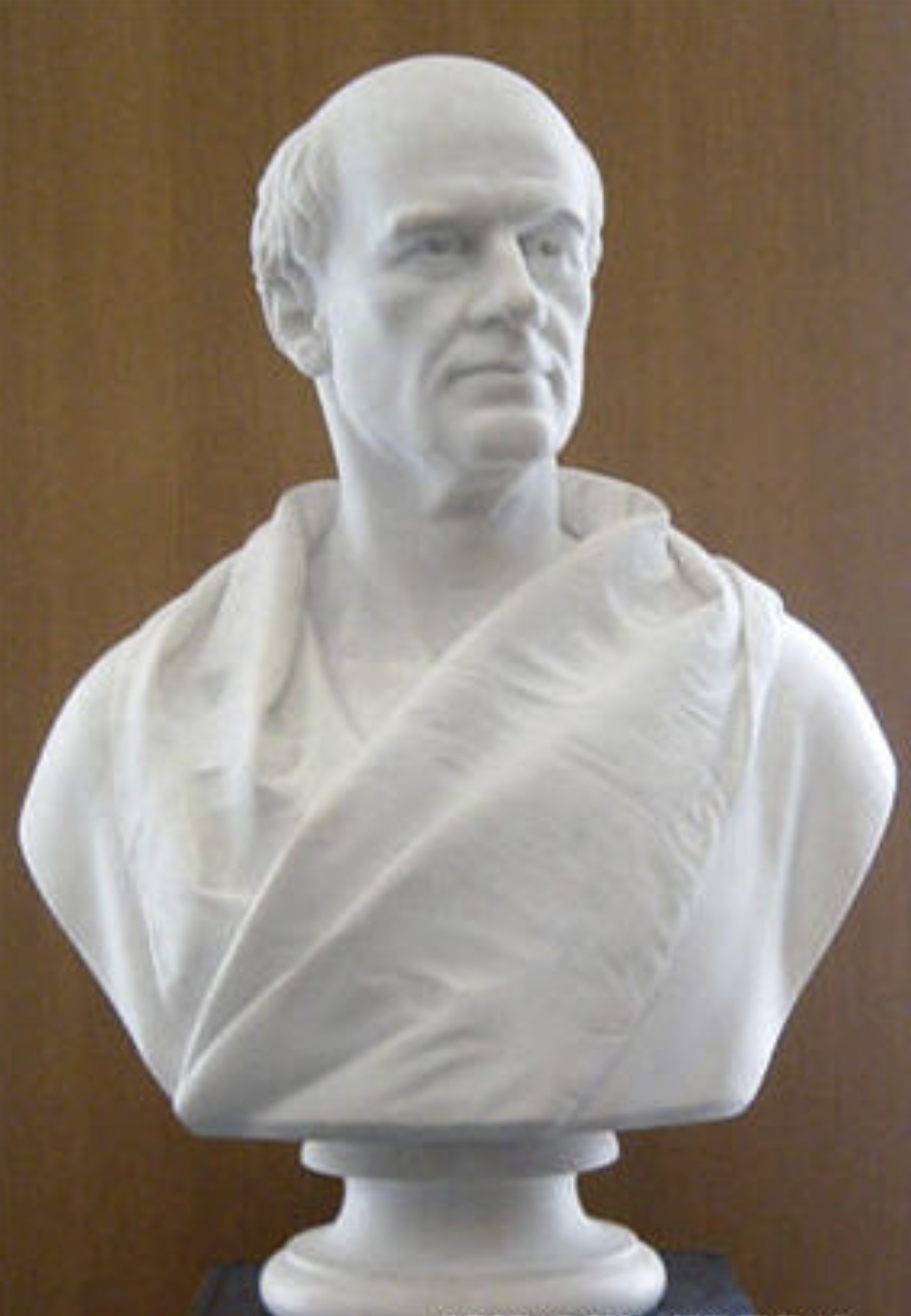
Bust of Thomas Pretious Heslop by Francis John Williamson

Heslop was house-physician to the General Hospital, Birmingham, from 1848 to 1852, and physician to the Queen's Hospital from 1853 to 1860. From 1870 to 1882 he was Senior Physician at Queen's Hospital. Heslop was the chief consultant physician in Midland counties many years. Not satisfied with the level of hospital care in Birmingham in the nineteenth century, Heslop founding several hospitals during his career. He founded first the Free Hospital for Children, which opened in Steel House Lane in 1861. This was followed by the Women's Hospital 1871 and the Skin and Lock Hospital in 1880. He also founded the Midland Medical Society in 1848.

Heslop was also closely tied to the city's academic scientific training colleges. Historian Rachael E. Waterhouse has written that 'he possessed great ability in his profession, was extremely jealous of its character and reputation, and directed much effort to raising the status of the qualified doctor' throughout his career. He was professor of physiology at Queen's College, Birmingham from 1853 to 1858 and a senior administrator of Mason Science College, becoming trustee of the college in 1873, and president of the council from 1884 until his death. Heslop's published works include The Realities of Medical Attendance on the Sick Children of the Poor (1869) and The Abuse of Alcohol in the Treatment of Acute Diseases (1872).

=== Death and legacy ===
Heslop died near Braemar on 17 June 1885, of angina pectoris, and was buried at Dublin on 20 June. In his will, he left 11,000 volumes to the college, which went on to become the foundation of the University of Birmingham's library. The university's Heslop Room is named after him. Shortly after his death, Mason College commissioned a bust of Heslop by the noted English sculptor Francis John Williamson; it now forms part of the University of Birmingham's permanent collection. The Heslop Gold Medal and the Heslop Memorial Scholarship were bequeathed in his honour at Mason Science College.

Writing of his career as founder of the Children's Hospital, the historian R.A. Lewis wrote, 'Thomas Pretious Heslop, the founder, [was] a notable specimen of that well-characterized type of reformer, the medical man whose experience in treating the poor impelled him into a campaign for social and political change.' The Free Hospital for Children survives today as the Birmingham Children's Hospital.
