= Baberton =

Suburb of Edinburgh, Scotland

Coordinates: 55°54′43″N 3°17′7″W

Baberton, also known as Baberton Mains, is a suburb of Edinburgh, the capital of Scotland, located south-west of the Edinburgh City Bypass and Wester Hailes and south of the Shotts Line railway line. The village of Juniper Green is situated to the south of Baberton and Baberton Golf Course is to the west.

Most of Baberton Mains comprises a housing estate built in the early 1970s by George Wimpey. All streets take the "Baberton Mains" name but some streets in Juniper Green take the name Baberton and not Baberton Mains.

Although the antiquarian writer James Grant stated Baberton House was the property of King James VI in the early 17th century and he gifted it to Alexander Brand, one of his favourites, prior to his death in 1625. More modern architectural historians note that Baberton House was designed and built in 1623 for his own occupation by the architect Sir James Murray of Kilbaberton (d.1634), King's Master of Works.

Bradshaw's Guide says Baberton House was a hunting lodge of King James VI and that King Charles X of France lived here after the July Revolution of 1830. Baberton House was the home of the Edinburgh physician Byrom Bramwell, and his friend and colleague Charles Edward Underhill died here in 1908.

== Publications ==
C&B News – originally Currie & Balerno News – is a monthly volunteer-run “local community news magazine” (available in print and as a downloadable PDF) covering Baberton Mains and neighbouring Currie, Balerno, Juniper Green and Colinton. Originally launched in February 1976, and published 10 times a year, the magazine features local news and articles, contributions from local political representatives, and updates on local planning issues—all voluntarily submitted by local residents. The magazine published its 500th issue in October 2024and celebrated its 50th anniversary in February 2026.

A bespoke edition of the “lifestyle and community magazine” Konect is delivered to households in Juniper Green as well as neighbouring Balerno, Currie, Baberton Mains and Ratho.
