= Francis John Williamson =

British artist (1833–1920)

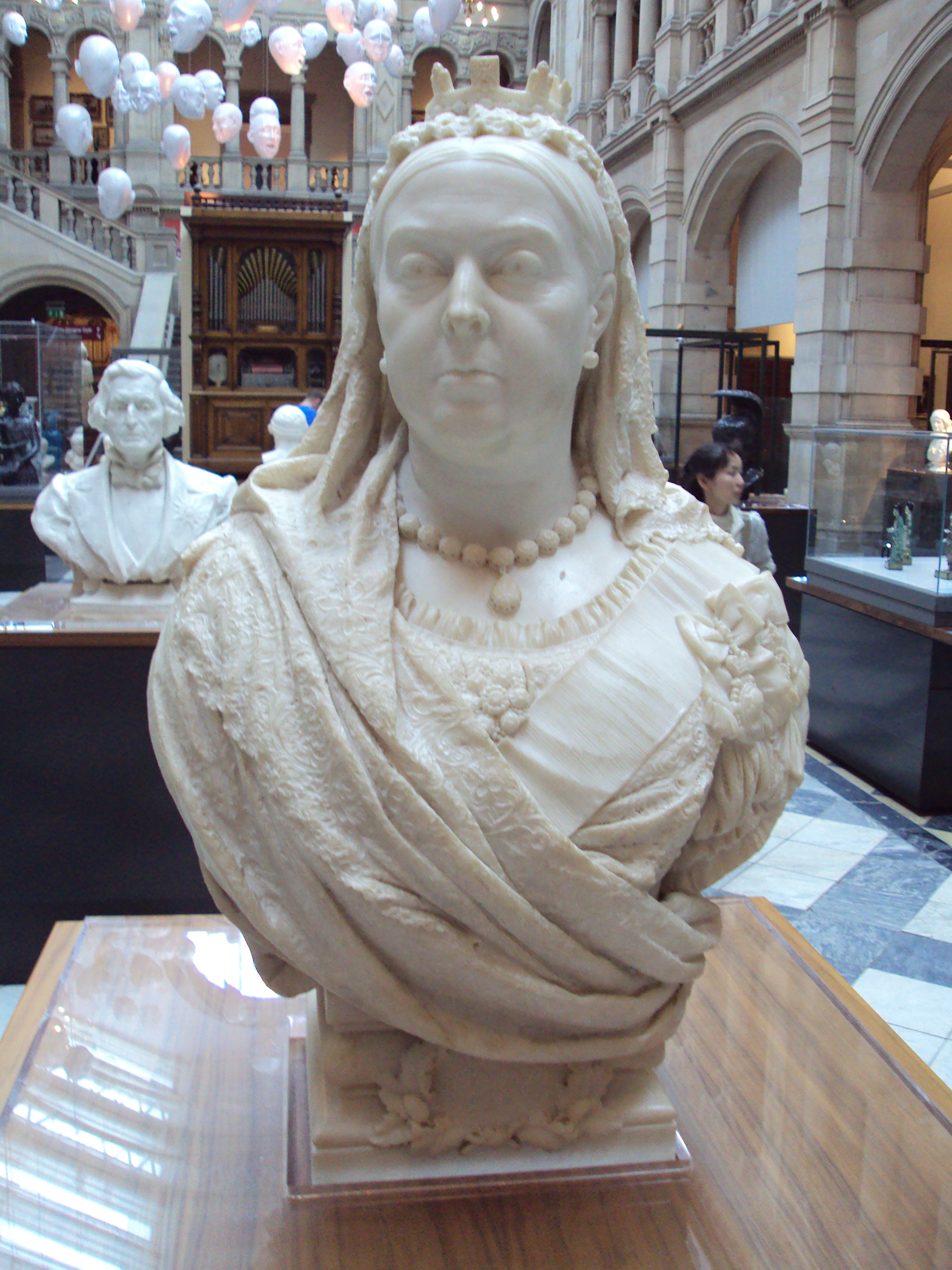
- The sculptor's bust of Queen Victoria
- Born: 17 July 1833; Hampstead, London, England
- Died: 12 March 1920 (aged 86); Esher, Surrey, England
- Occupation: Sculptor

Francis John Williamson (17 July 1833 – 12 March 1920) was a British portrait sculptor, reputed to have been Queen Victoria's favourite.

== Career ==
After studying under John Bell he was an articled pupil of John Henry Foley for seven years, and his studio assistant for a further fourteen.

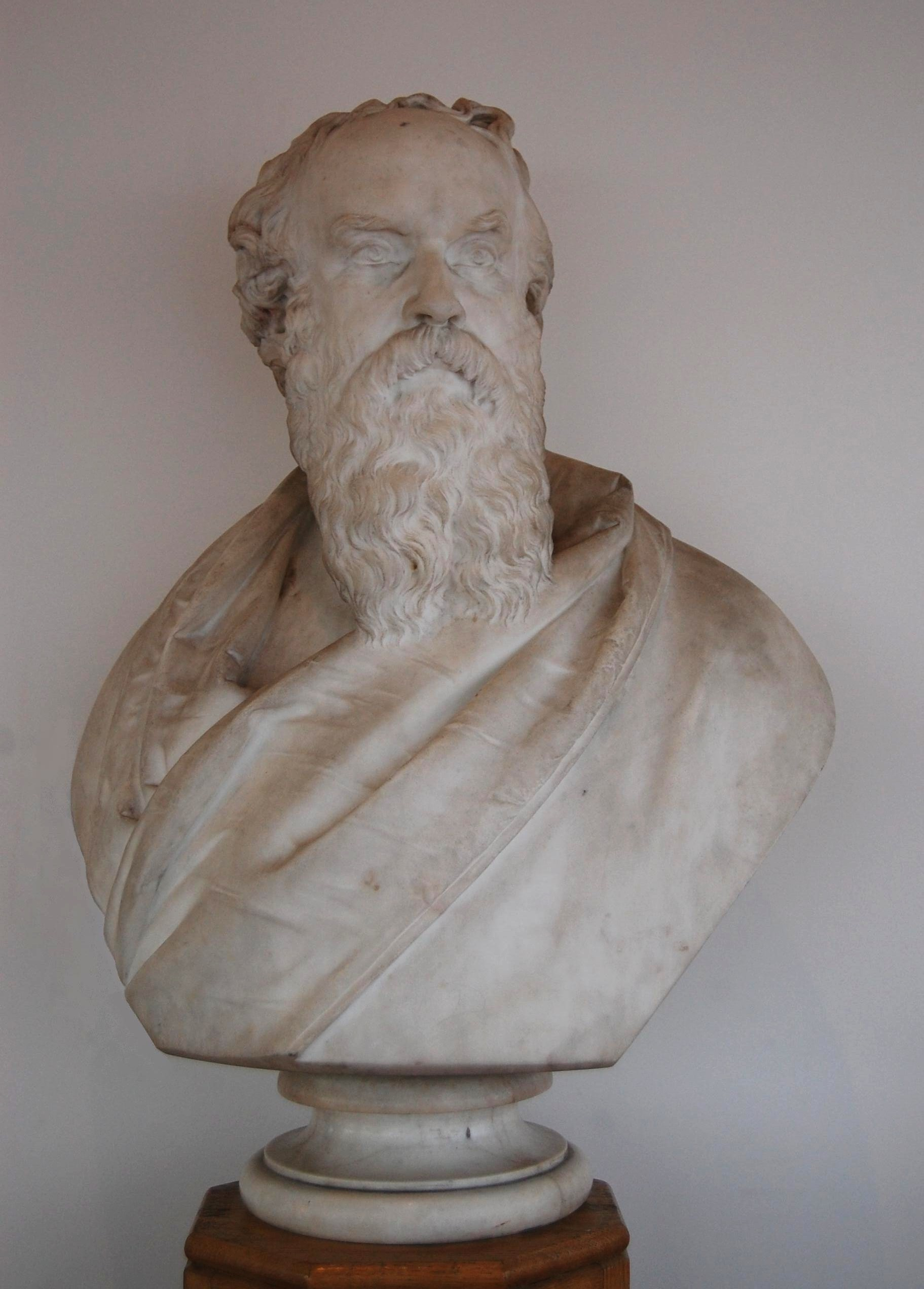
Bust of Samuel Timmins in the Library of Birmingham

Williamson exhibited with the Royal Academy of Arts 38 times from 1853–1897. and with the Royal Birmingham Society of Artists in 1868, when he showed several items, including a medallion depicting Mrs W. Wills, 1887 and 1902. It was during his time with Foley that he first met Victoria. In 1870, she commissioned a memorial to George IV's daughter Princess Charlotte and her husband Prince Leopold (Victoria's uncle) which was erected inside their former home, Claremont. (The memorial was subsequently moved to St George's Church, Esher.) Many members of the royal family subsequently sat for him, and in 1887 he sculpted the (Golden) Jubilee bust of Queen Victoria, which was replicated for display around the British Empire.

Williamson received a number of commissions from the municipal authorities in Birmingham. These included a marble bust of the Shakespearian scholar Samuel Timmins, now in the Library of Birmingham, a statue of the dissenting theologian and natural philosopher Joseph Priestley, now in Chamberlain Square, a statue of Sir Josiah Mason, (destroyed, but a 1952 bronze cast of the bust, by William Bloye, is in the suburb of Erdington), a statue of preacher and reformer George Dawson (since destroyed), a statue of John Skirrow Wright (also destroyed; a 1956 bronze cast of the bust by Bloye is in Birmingham Council House), and the decoration on the pediment of the Birmingham Museum and Art Gallery, a work known as the Allegory of Fame Rewarding the Arts. A plaster cast of his bust of Tennyson (1893) is in the National Portrait Gallery.

He met his future wife, Elizabeth Smith, while staying in Esher and they married in 1857 In 1860, they set up a home and him a studio at Fairholme, 79, High Street, Esher, where he eventually died. The building (later named "The Bunch of Grapes" and now "Grapes House") is extant, and carries a blue plaque, erected by the Esher Residents Association in 2010, in commemoration of Williamson.

His younger brother John Henry Williamson (born c. 1843) was a silversmith.

== List of selected works ==
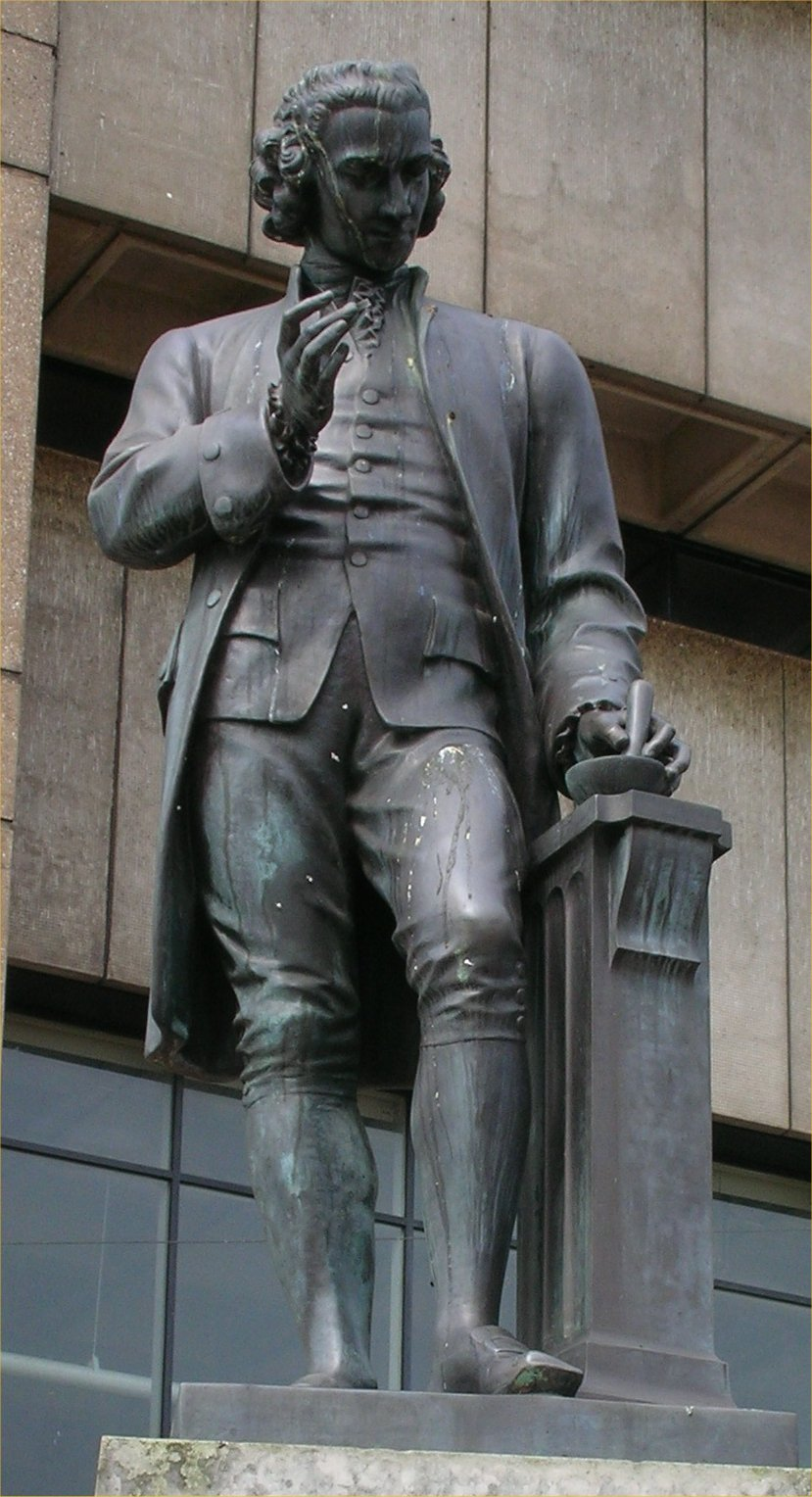
Statue of Joseph Priestley in Chamberlain Square, Birmingham

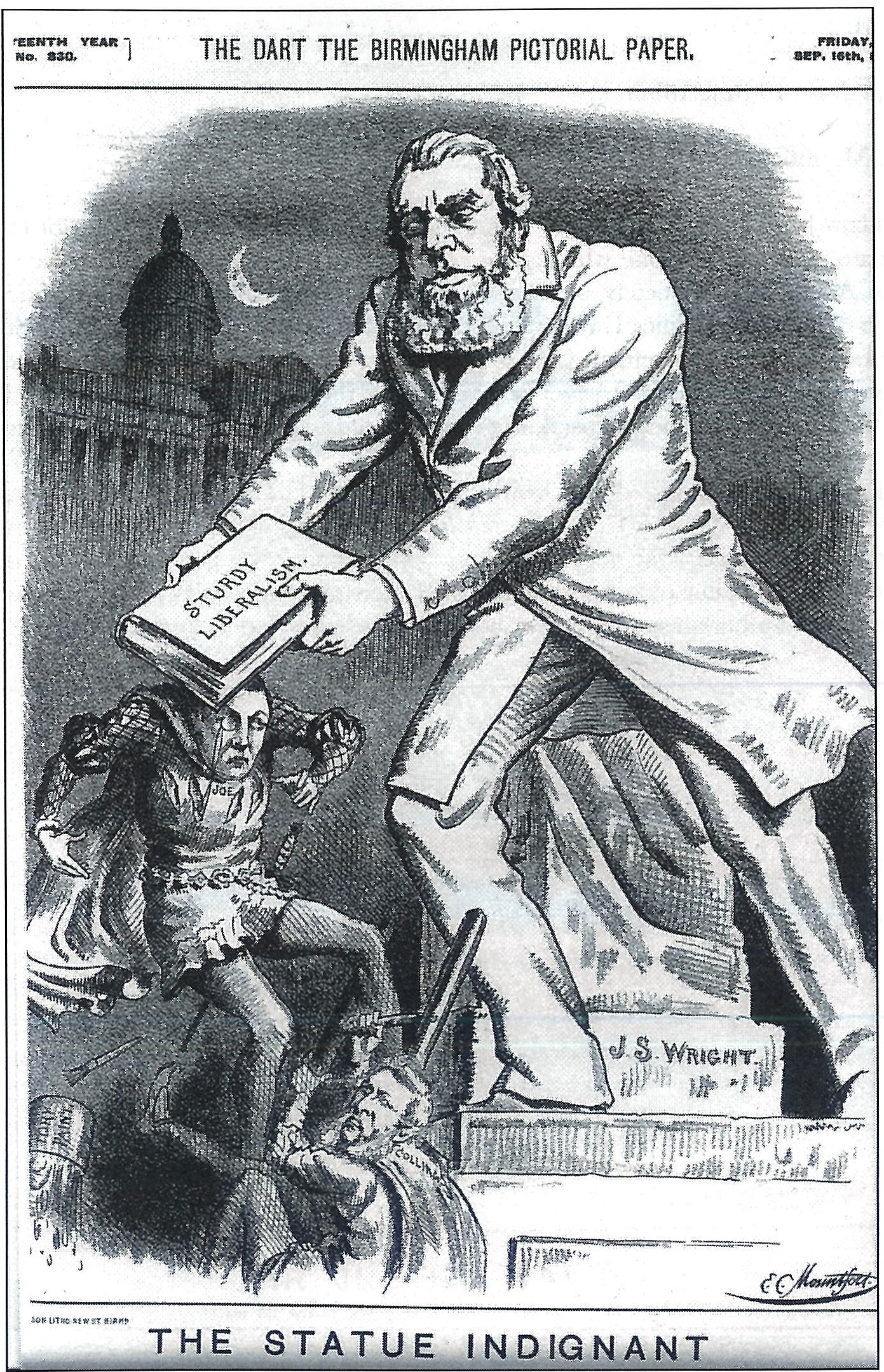
"The Statue Indignant": cartoon of 1892 depicting Williamson's statue of John Skirrow Wright in Colmore Row, Birmingham, stepping off its plinth to beat Joseph Chamberlain

- Bust of Samuel Timmins, now in the Library of Birmingham
- Statue of Sister Dora, Walsall
- Memorial to Prince Leopold and Princess Charlotte, now at St George's Church, Esher, Surrey
- Memorial Bust of the Duke of Albany, Christ Church, Esher
- Diamond Jubilee Memorial, Esher
- Tomb of William Brett, 1st Viscount Esher and Viscountess Esher, Christ Church churchyard, Esher
- The Shrubsole Memorial, Market Place, Kingston upon Thames
- Bust of Lord Tennyson
- Bust of Thomas Pretious Heslop
- Queen Victoria, bust, many copies
- life size marble statue of Queen Victoria at Kings Park, Perth (1902)
- Hypatia
- His Royal Highness Prince Edward of York
- Monument to James Young Gibson in Dean Cemetery, Edinburgh (1887)
- Jesus as the Good Shepherd
- Allegory of Fame Rewarding the Arts, Pediment, Birmingham Museum and Art Gallery (1884)
- a statue of Sir Josiah Mason (1885; destroyed)
  - bronze cast of the bust, by William Bloye (1952)
- statue of George Dawson (1885; destroyed)
  - bronze cast of bust, by Bloye (1951; stolen, presumed scrapped)
- statue of John Skirrow Wright (1883; destroyed)
  - bronze cast of bust, by Bloye (1956)
- Joseph Priestley statue, now in Chamberlain Square, Birmingham (Bronze, cast in 1951 from marble original of 1874)
- Memorial to Dean Milman, St Paul's Cathedral
- statue of Hugh Stowell Brown, (1889) now restored and in Hope Street, Liverpool

== See also ==
- George Phoenix, collaborator
