= James Matthews Duncan =

Scottish physician

James Matthews Duncan FRS FRSE FRCP FRCPE
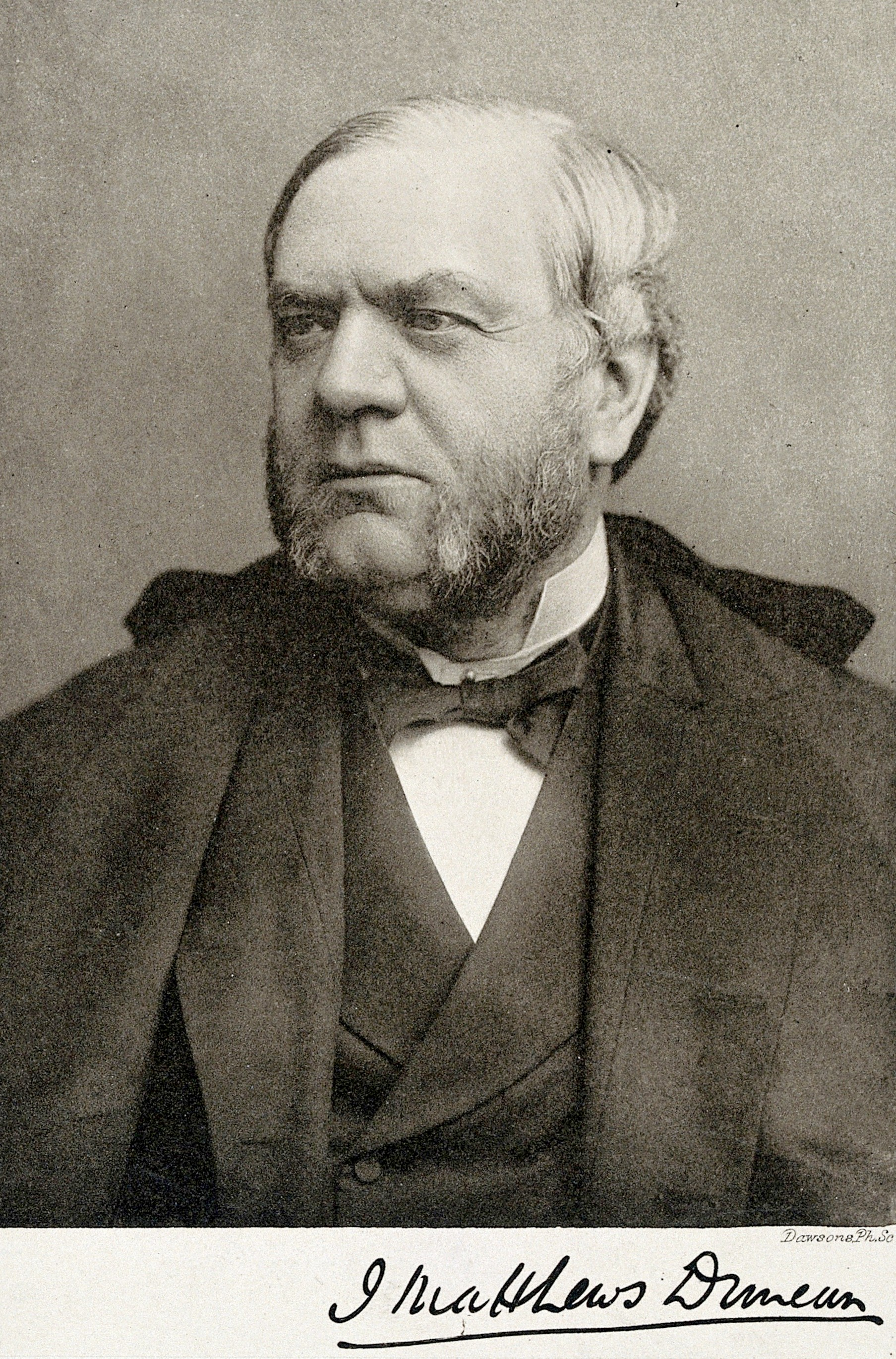
- Born: April 1826; Aberdeen, United Kingdom of Great Britain and Ireland
- Died: 1 September 1890 (aged 64); Baden-Baden, German Empire
- Education: Aberdeen grammar school Marischal College, Aberdeen
- Occupations: Physician, obstetrician

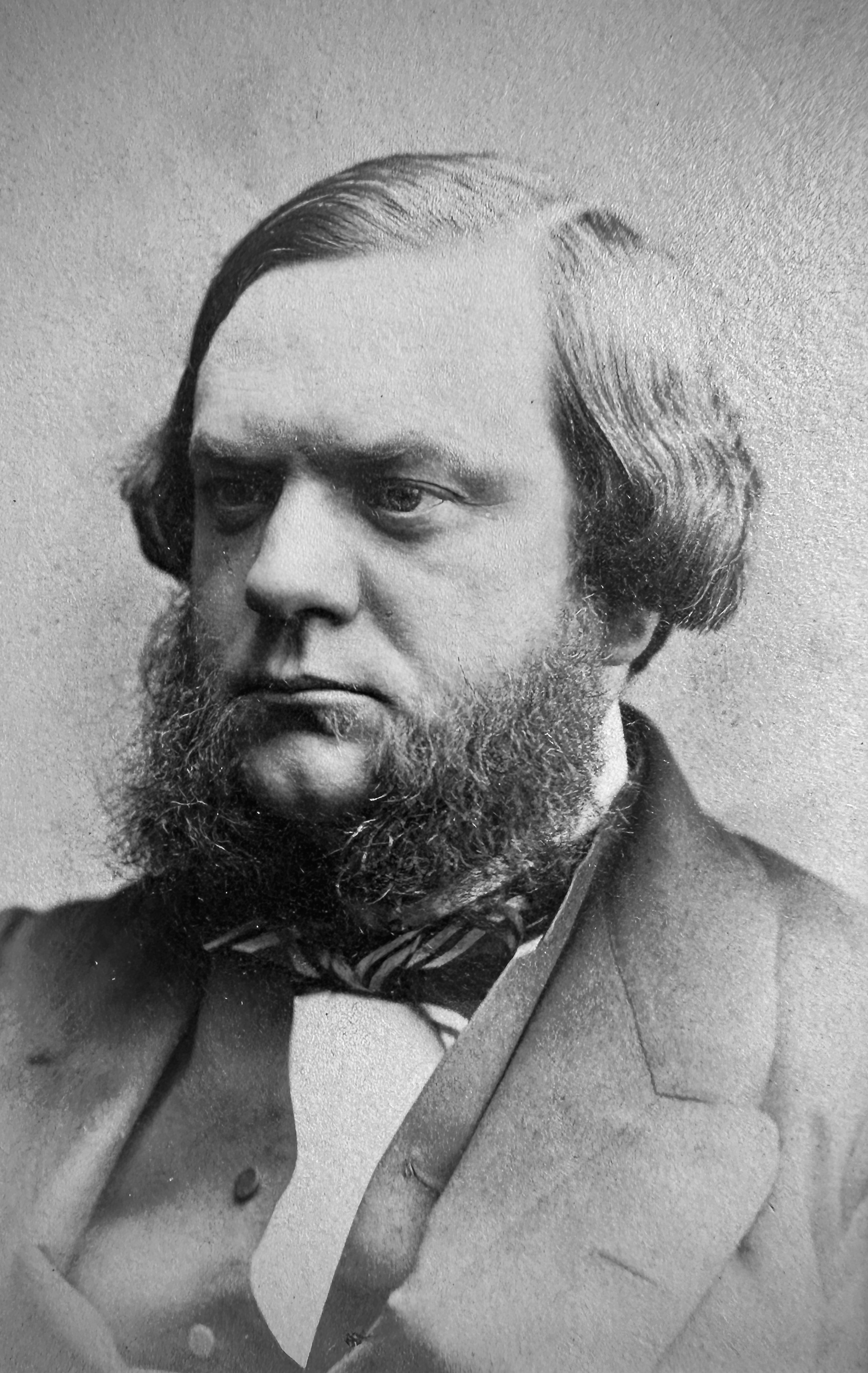
Duncan in middle age

James Matthews Duncan (April 1826 – 1 September 1890) was a Scottish physician, known as a practitioner of and author on obstetrics.

== Life ==
The fifth child of William Duncan, a merchant, and his wife Isabella Matthews, he was born on 29 April 1826 in Aberdeen. After education at Aberdeen grammar school, he entered Marischal College, Aberdeen, studying Medicine and graduated M.A. in April 1843. He continued study at Edinburgh University in 1845, and, returning to Aberdeen, graduated M.D. in 1846, before he was 21.

Duncan spent the winter of 1846–7 in Paris, attending the lectures of Gabriel Andral, Jean Cruveilhier, Mathieu Orfila, and Alfred-Armand-Louis-Marie Velpeau. He returned in April 1847, and shortly became the assistant in Edinburgh of James Young Simpson. He assisted Simpson in his experiments in anaesthetics, and on 4 November 1847 experimentally inhaled chloroform to the point of insensibility.

At the end of 1849, after some months of travel in attendance on the Marquess of Bute, Duncan began practice in Edinburgh, mainly as an obstetrician. He became a fellow of the Royal College of Physicians of Edinburgh in 1851, and in May 1853 began a course of lectures on midwifery at the Edinburgh Extramural School of Medicine.. He built up a practice, and in 1861 was made physician to the ward for diseases of women in the Royal Infirmary of Edinburgh.

In 1852 Duncan was elected a member of the Harveian Society of Edinburgh and served as President in 1876. He was elected a Fellow of the Royal Society of Edinburgh in 1863 his proposer being Sir Robert Christison. At this time he was living at 30 Charlotte Square a huge Georgian townhouse in Edinburgh's New Town. The house was later sold to Prof William Rutherford Sanders.

In 1870 he was elected a member of the Aesculapian Club. He wrote numerous papers on obstetrics, and from 1873 to 1875 was president of the Edinburgh Obstetrical Society.

In 1870, on the death of Simpson, Duncan was a candidate for the professorship of midwifery at Edinburgh, but was not elected. In 1877 the staff of St. Bartholomew's Hospital, meeting at the house of Sir William Savory, decided to ask him to accept the lectureship on midwifery, then vacant in their school, with the post of obstetric physician to the hospital. He was elected, and came to live at 71 Brook Street, Grosvenor Square, London. He immediately became a member of the College of Physicians of London, and in 1883 was elected a fellow, and delivered the Gulstonian lectures. He was elected Fellow of the Royal Society on 7 June 1883, and in the same year was nominated by the Crown a member of the General Council of Medical Education and Registration.

Duncan's practice became large, and his standing in his profession high. In 1890 his health began to fail, and he did not finish his usual course of lectures.

He went abroad in July, and after several attacks of angina pectoris he died at Baden-Baden in Germany on 1 September 1890.

== Works ==
Duncan published in 1866 Fecundity, Fertility, and Sterility; a second edition appeared in 1871. It made him an international reputation as an authority in obstetrics. Other works were:

- Researches in Obstetrics (1868);
- Treatise on Parametritis and Perimetritis (1869);
- The Mortality of Childbed and Maternity Hospitals (1870);
- Fecundity, Fertility, Sterility and Allied Topics (1871)
- Papers on the Female Perineum (1879);
- Clinical Lectures on Diseases of Women (1879, 1883, 1886, 1889); and
- On Sterility in Women (1884).

== Family ==
Duncan married, in 1860, Janet Hart Hotchkis, and had 13 children.

== Eponymous terms ==
- Duncan curette an endometrial biopsy curette
- Duncan fold - "the folds on the peritoneal surface of the uterus immediately after delivery."
- Duncan mechanism - one of the two mechanisms of placenta delivery, the other being the Schultz mechanism
- Duncan position
- Duncan ventricle - the cave of septum pellucidum

== Notes ==
Attribution

This article incorporates text from a publication now in the public domain: Lee, Sidney, ed. (1901). "Duncan, James Matthews". Dictionary of National Biography (1st supplement). Vol. 2. London: Smith, Elder & Co.
