= Queen Victoria Monument, Wellington =

Statue in Wellington, New Zealand

Queen Victoria Monument
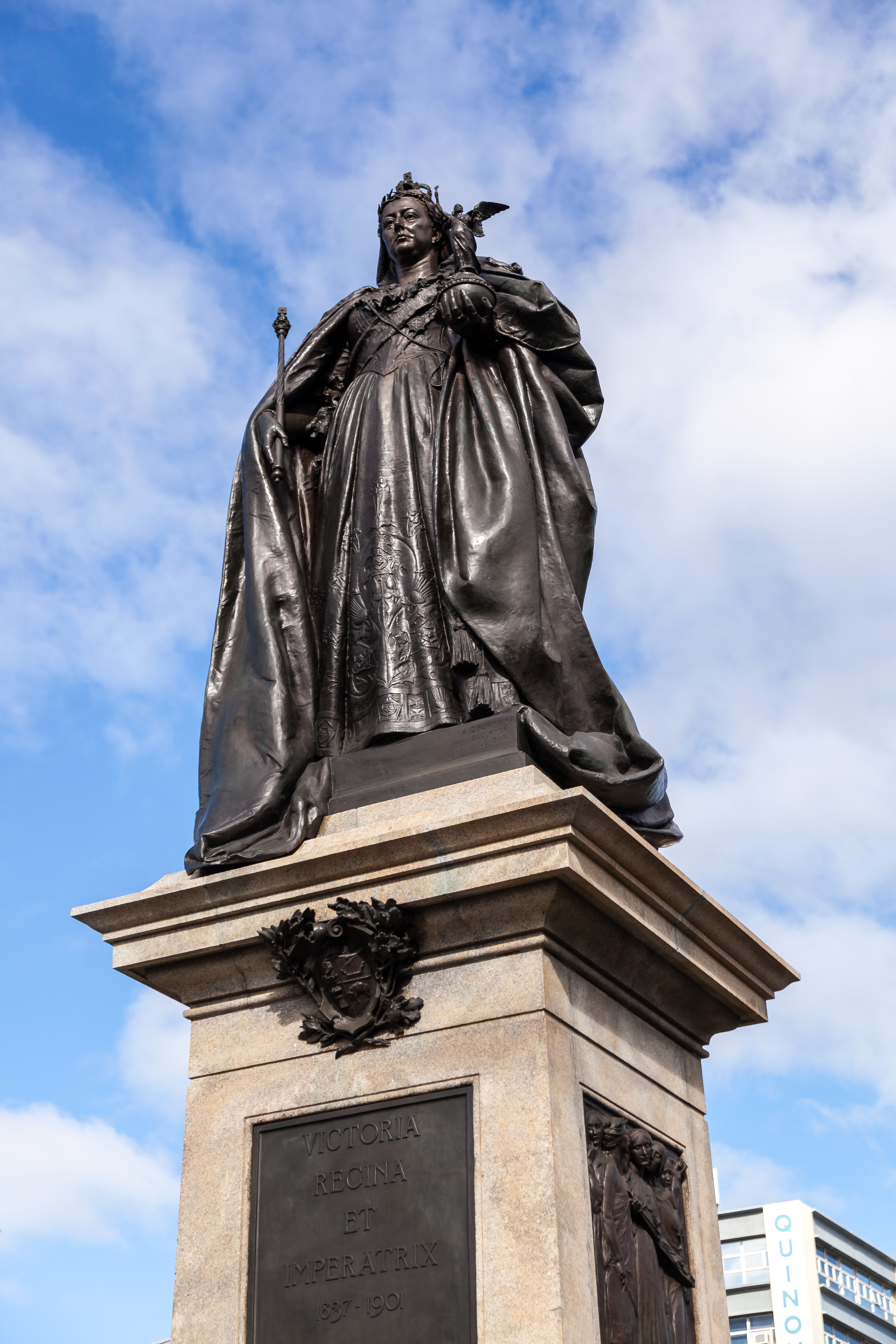
- Interactive map of Queen Victoria Monument
- Location: Mount Victoria, Wellington, New Zealand
- Coordinates: 41°17′42.8″S 174°46′59.5″E
- Designer: Alfred Drury
- Material: Bronze (statue); Granite (pedestal)
- Height: 305 cm (statue alone); 7 m (including pedestal)
- Opening date: 29 April 1905 (121 years ago)

Heritage New Zealand – Category 2
- Designated: 6 June 1984
- Reference no.: 3663

Wellington's Queen Victoria Monument is an early 20th-century statue of Queen Victoria by British sculptor Alfred Drury. Copied after Drury's earlier 1903 statue in Portsmouth, England, Victoria is depicted standing triumphantly in her Robe of State and widow's cap, holding a royal sceptre and orb. The monument's plinth additionally features a plaque and three bronze reliefs designed in the New Sculpture style, depicting the Treaty of Waitangi and various artistic and scientific inventions of the Victorian era.

Initially located at Post Office Square, the statue was relocated in 1911 to the median between Kent Terrace and Cambridge Terrace within the Mount Victoria neighbourhood of Wellington, New Zealand. The monument faced negative public opinion and a lack of maintenance throughout the mid-20th century. However, attempts made in the 1990s to relocate the monument to its original location met considerable public backlash from Mount Victoria residents. The statue was repaired before the 2001 centenary of Queen Victoria's death.

== Background and creation ==
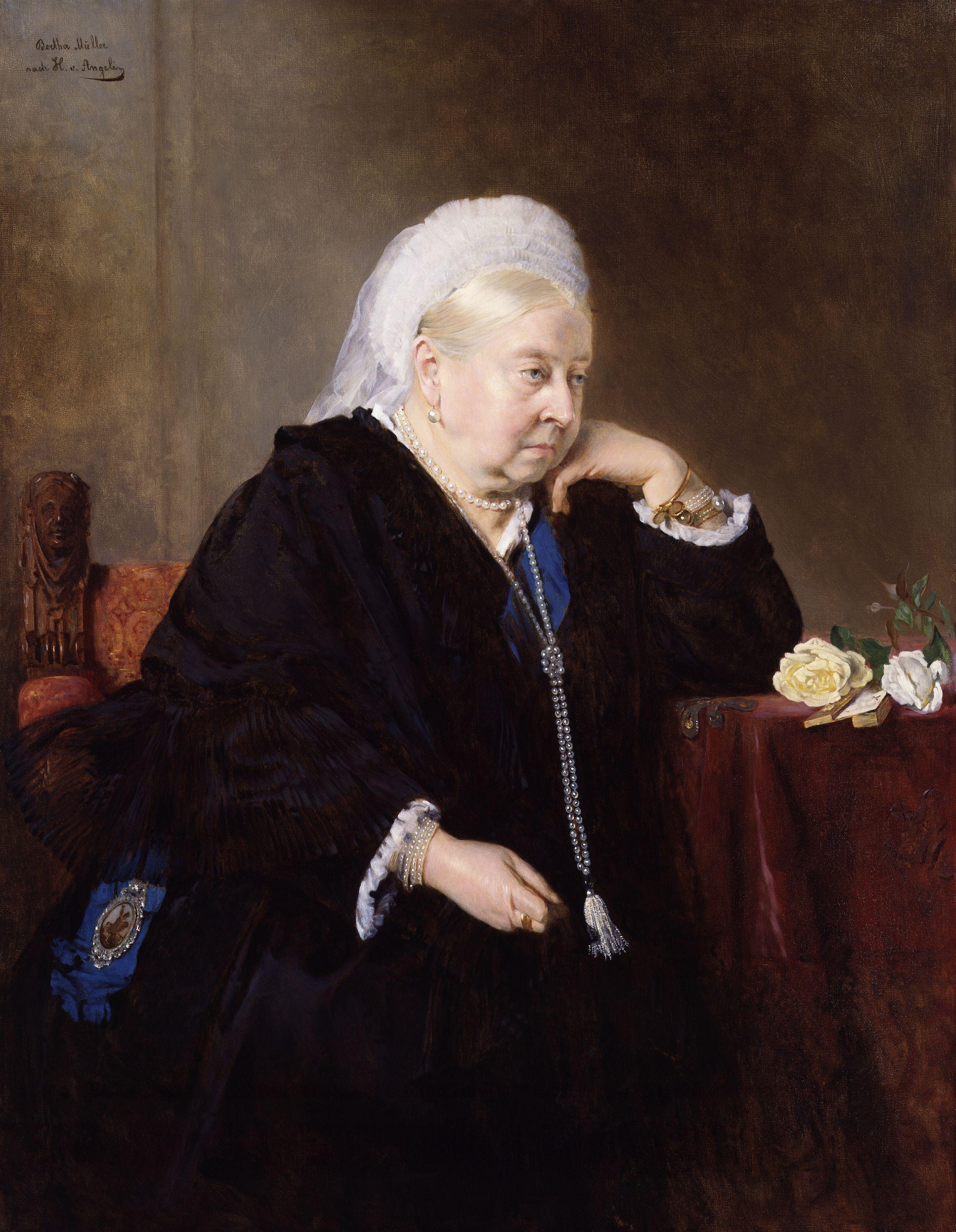
Queen Victoria, 1899

Queen Victoria was the monarch of the United Kingdom and the broader British Empire from 1837 to 1901. Celebrations and increased popularity following her Golden and Diamond Jubilees initiated a wave of public monuments to her across the Empire in the late 1800s, corresponding with a general international trend of nationalist sculpture and monument construction during this period.

The earliest public monument to Queen Victoria in New Zealand was a wooden bust of the queen erected in 1874 at the Māori village of Ohinemutu. An 1899 statue of the monarch, located at Albert Park, Auckland, was commissioned following the monarch's Diamond Jubilee. Another statue in Christchurch was commissioned shortly prior to the queen's death in January 1901, and was installed at Victoria Square in 1903.

=== Creation ===
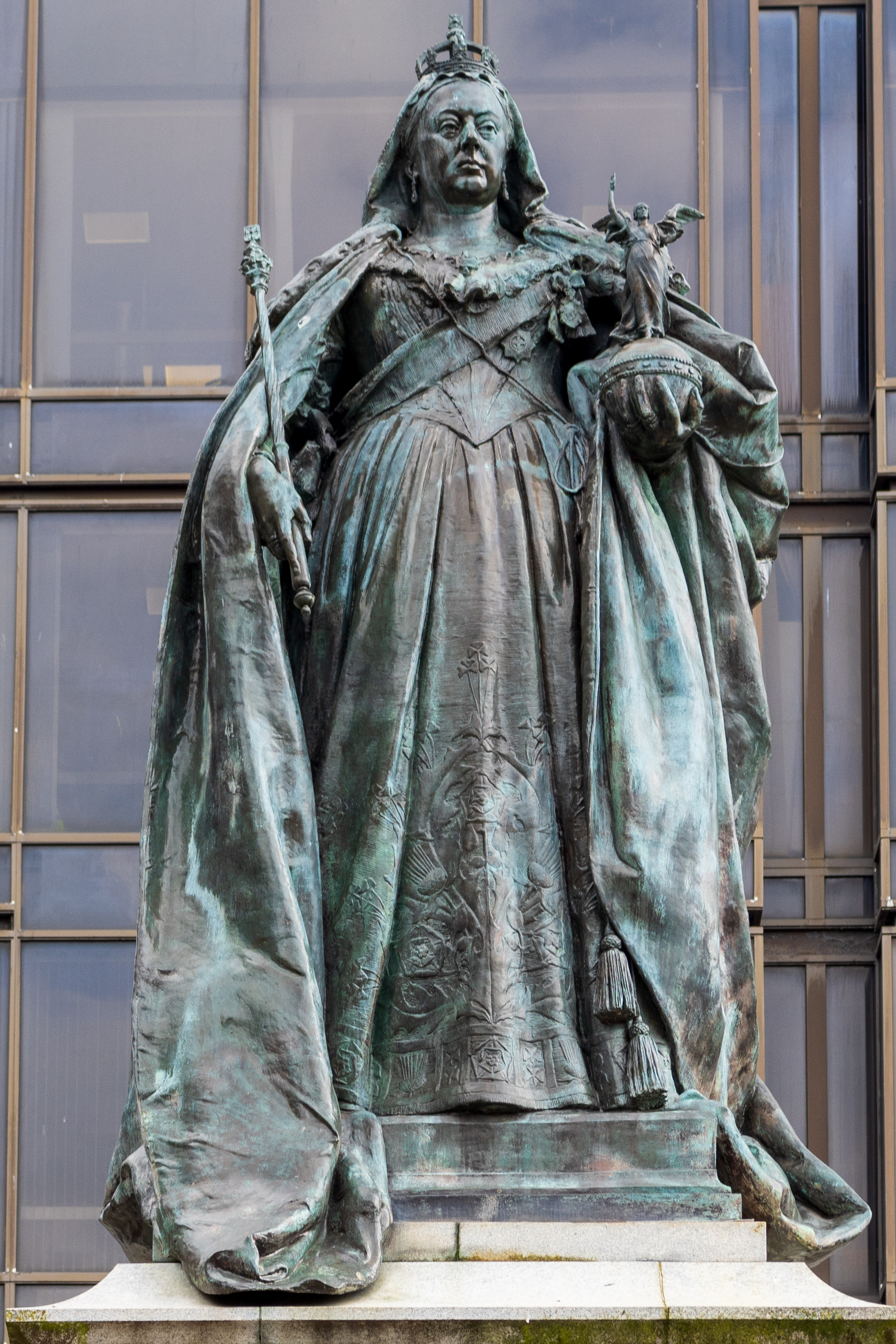
The Wellington statue was copied from another posthumous statue of Queen Victoria at Portsmouth. (pictured)

Following Victoria's death, a memorial committee was organised to collect funds for the construction of a national monument to Victoria in New Zealand. Governor Uchter Knox, Premier Richard Seddon, and High Commissioner William Pember Reeves prepared to commission a sculptor to create the statue. Governor Knox responded warmly to public calls for a local sculptor, but noted that creating a statue worthy of the capital city was most important. A location for the statue at Post Office Square was generally agreed upon by February 1901.

To the agreement of the memorial committee, Knox suggested that the statue be pursued as a national memorial to the late queen. Subscription lists soliciting donations were sent to various mayors and civil organisations across the colony. However, the collection of donations in other parts of New Zealand was decried, especially in the South Island. The Otago Daily Times called for citizens and local officials to instead pursue a statue at Dunedin, describing it as unfair to expect New Zealanders to "contribute towards the erection of a statue which the large majority of them would never see".

Nevertheless, over £1,000 from public donations was raised during the first month. Seddon estimated a total budget of £3000, (Note: equivalent to £318,810 in 2025) twice the cost of the Victoria monument in Albert Park, Auckland. The commission was publicised in English newspapers, but the possibility of a competition between various applicants was dismissed as being less likely to attract premium talent. Reeves initially sought to consult famed sculptors Edward Onslow Ford and Hamo Thornycroft for the monument, but following lack of interest from Thornycroft and the death of Ford, New Sculpture artist Alfred Drury was instead commissioned. The Wellington monument was part of a series of three statues of Victoria sculpted by him, including an identical counterpart at Portsmouth, and a larger rendition at Bradford, both in England.

Drury finished a model for the statue in 1902. The bronze statue was cast at the Morris Singer foundry in Frome, Somerset. Already experiencing large volumes of statue orders prior to the queen's death, a posthumous rush in demand led to significant delays. The foundry was unable to cast more than one Victoria statue at a time due to their large size. The decision was made to ship and unveil the Wellington statue without its commemorative bronze reliefs, as was done with the statue at Christchurch. One of the bronze reliefs, Fine Arts, Literature, and Music, was exhibited at the London Royal Academy in 1904.

The statue was transported to New Zealand aboard the SS Turakina of the New Zealand Shipping Company, reaching Wellington on 10 April 1905. It was installed at Post Office Square, near Queens Wharf in central Wellington. The statue was officially unveiled by Lord Plunket on 29 April 1905, in company with Premier Seddon and Wellington Mayor John Aitken.

== Composition ==
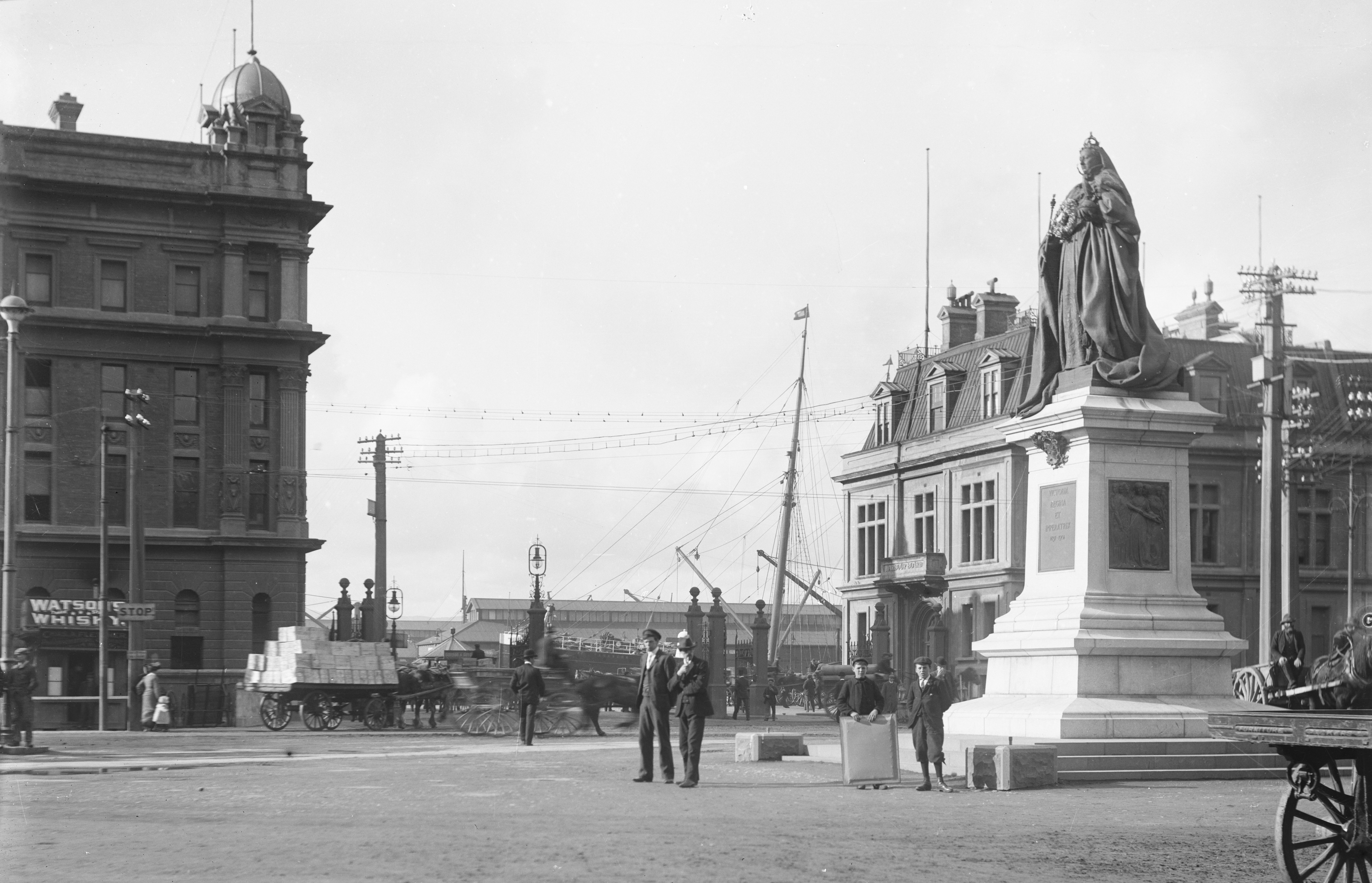
Monument at its original location at Post Office Square, .c. 1910

The monument features a bronze statue of Queen Victoria, atop an Aberdeen granite plinth featuring a plaque and three bronze reliefs, a rare example of New Sculpture design in New Zealand. The statue of Victoria itself stands at 305 cm tall, atop a 410 cm tall plinth, for a total height slightly above 7 metres. Victoria wears the Robe of State, a widow's cap with veil, and her tiny crown customarily worn on top of the cap. She holds a royal sceptre in one hand, while in her other she holds the Sovereign's Orb topped with a small winged figure representing Victory.

The four sides of the monument's plinth are decorated with a series of bronze reliefs designed by Alfred Drury; The Signing of the Treaty of Waitangi; Fine Arts, Literature and Music; and The Inventions of Victoria’s Reign; as well as a latin plaque bearing Queen Victoria's titles and years of reign. The three reliefs were constructed with a time-consuming lost-wax cast in order to achieve precise details.

The depiction of the Treaty of Waitangi was featured on the ten shilling banknote in 1940, as well as on a discarded draft for the Waitangi commemorative crown coin. However, this depiction was subject to frequent public criticism due to historical inaccuracies, as well as presenting the treaty outside of the context of later confiscations of Māori land. Historian and MP Lindsay Buick described Captain Hobson's depiction in full military dress as a "concession to art", as Hobson had actually rushed to the treaty signing wearing civilian dress and his uniform's cocked hat.

== History ==
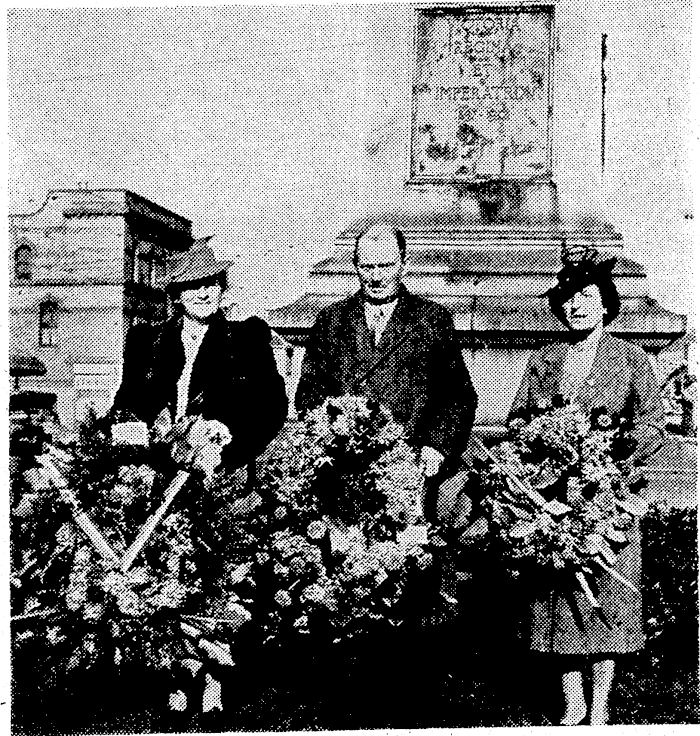
Local dignitaries laid wreaths at the statue on Empire Day, 1945

The statue became a site of patriotic commemorations and observances. Wreaths were laid at the foot of the statue during various Empire Day celebrations in the early 20th century.

The monument was relocated from Post Office Square in 1911 and placed instead in the median island that separates Cambridge and Kent Terraces in the Mount Victoria neighbourhood. The relocation has been attributed to increasing traffic issues around Jervois Quay, coupled with the introduction of electric trams.

Maintenance of the statue was neglected through much of the twentieth century. The statue was varnished for a 1920 visit by Edward, Prince of Wales. A second varnish applied to the statue in 1925 was criticised by local press as "vandalism". The Wellington City Engineer described the lacquering as quick to mellow, and ultimately necessary for cleaning the statue without damaging the stone base.

The city government lacquered and gilded the monument in late 1947, producing a "sickly, bright, greasy appearance". Sculptor Richard Gross and the British Society of Sculptors protested the lacquering, but were contradicted by Mayor Will Appleton, who described the lacquering as needed to restore the statue to its former appearance. The lacquer was later removed after continued pressure. No further attempts to clean it were made, with local government rejecting repeated attempts by local volunteer organisations. Stairs were constructed around the monument during the 1960s to counteract tilting.

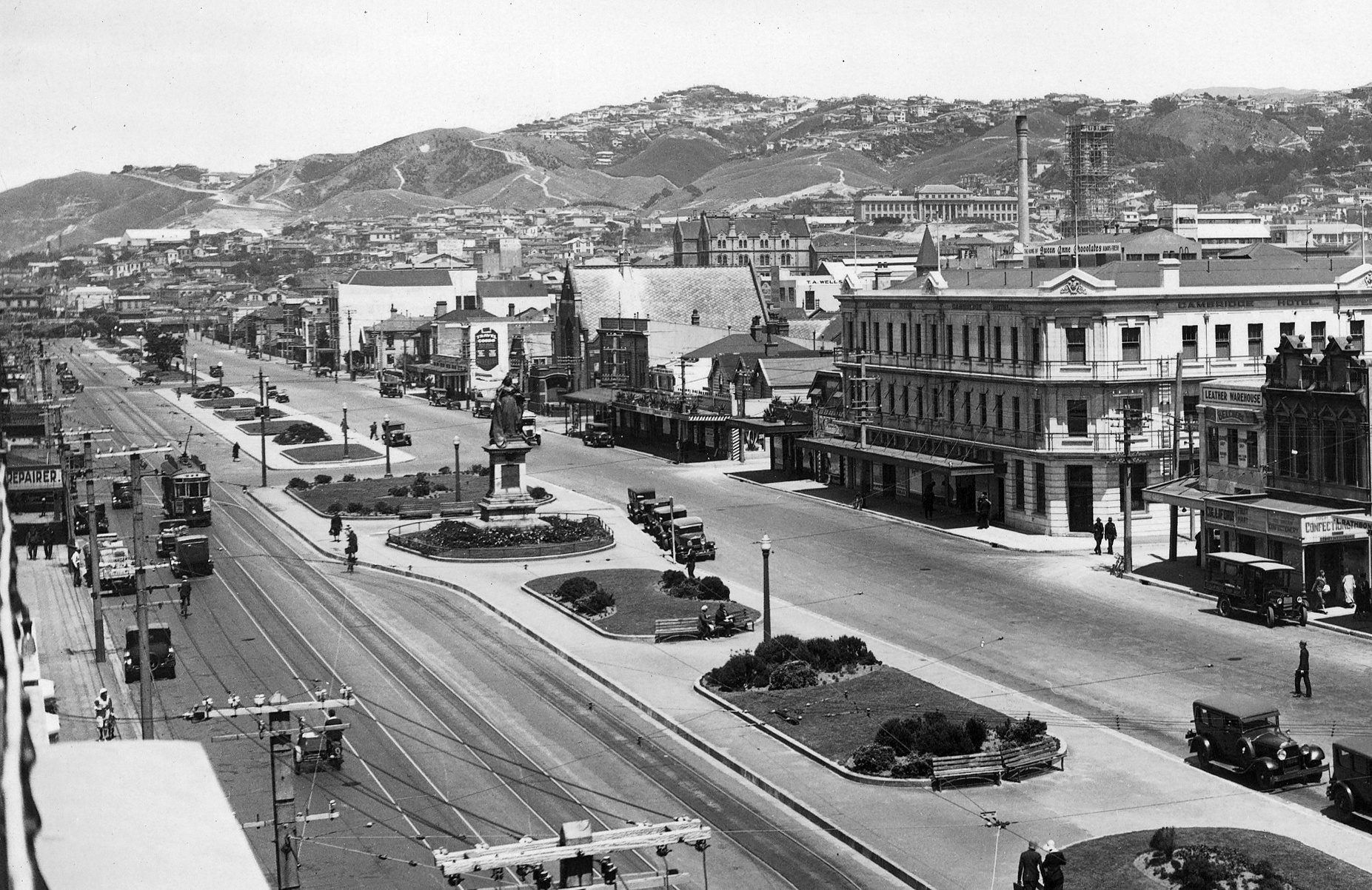
Monument in the 1930s, at its current location at the median strip between Cambridge and Kent Terraces.

Public opinion of the statue declined over the decades following its construction. In 1954, The Evening Post declared that the statue had "no artistic pretensions". The statue was the site of a lesbian visibility protest on International Women's Day in 1977, due to associations drawn by feminist activists between the statue and remnant Victorian morality and colonisation in New Zealand. In 2007, a Māori flag was tied to the statue to commemorate Waitangi Day. Along with several other statues, the statue was blindfolded as a protest against racism and colonial legacy in New Zealand.

A 1990s proposal to return the monument to its original location was strongly rejected by Mount Victoria locals. The monument was cleaned and repaired by council order in 2000 due to the impending hundredth anniversary of Queen Victoria's death.

== See also ==
- List of statues of Queen Victoria
