= Post Office Square, Wellington =

Public square in New Zealand

Coordinates: 41.2848°S 174.7774°E

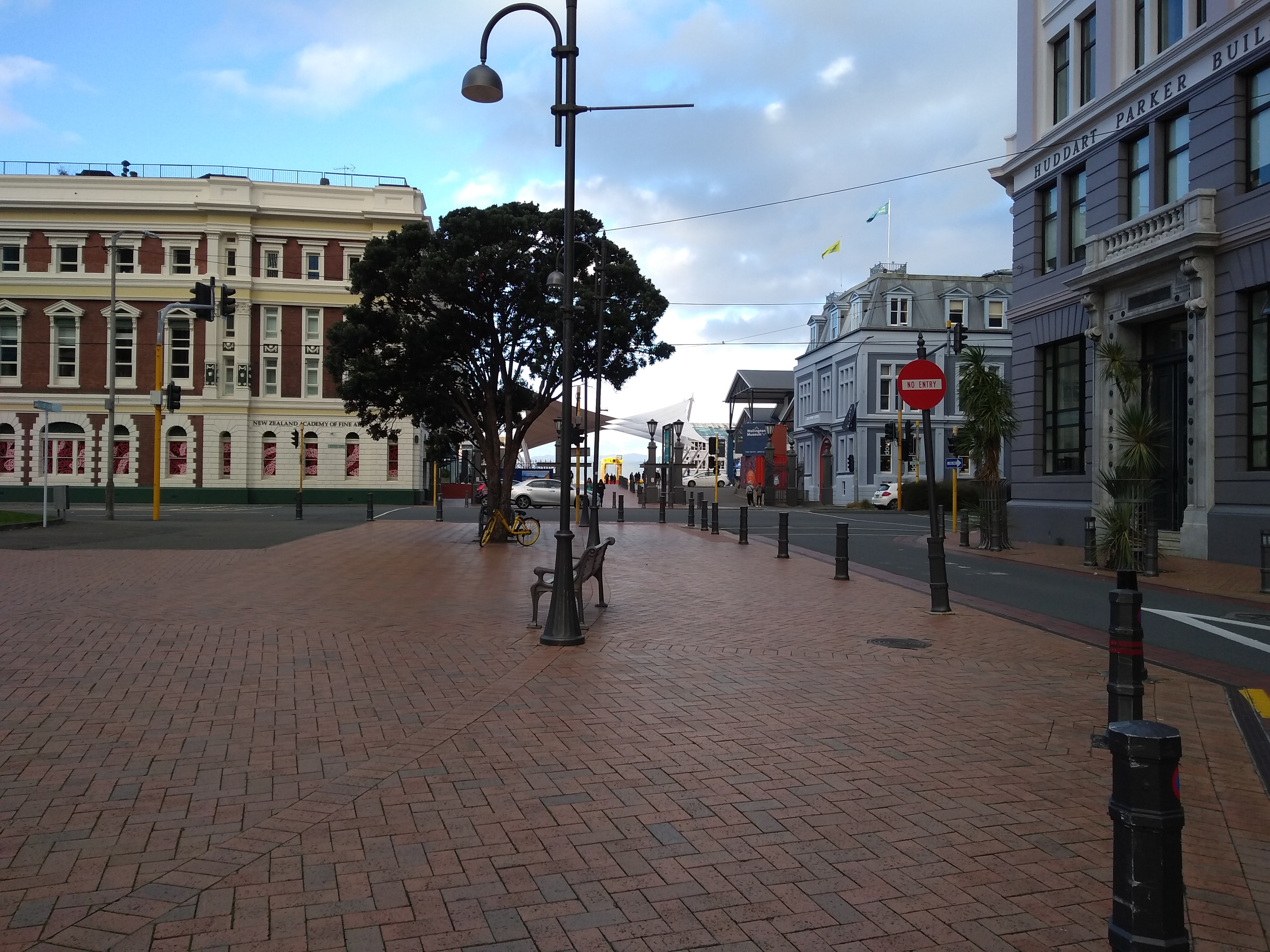
Post Office Square in 2019

Post Office Square is a public square in Wellington, New Zealand. It is located between Customhouse and Jervois quays and was named after the nearby General Post Office building, which was built in 1888 and demolished in 1974. The square features a heritage-listed red telephone box, a France Telecom phone booth artpiece, the SkyBlues sculpture and a small building known as the Clarrie Gibbons Building. Despite the square's name, it has not been near any post offices since about the 2000s.

== Location ==
Post Office Square is located in a triangular section of land between Customhouse and Jervois Quays. It is part of the Post Office Square heritage area, which contains several heritage buildings. The square itself sits on land reclaimed between 1857 and 1863.

== History ==
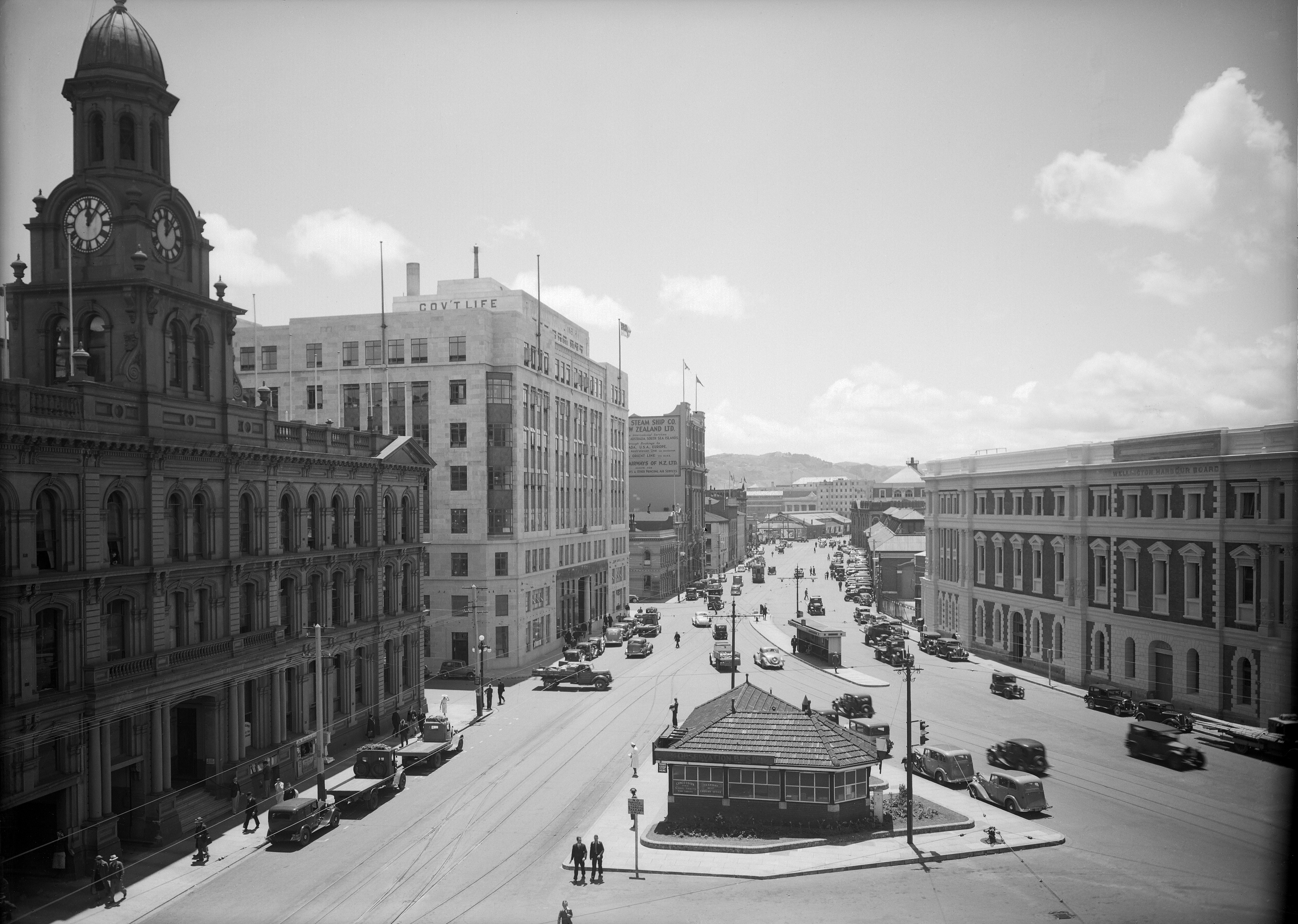
In this 1940 photograph, Post Office Square is in the bottom centre and the General Post Office is to the left.

Post Office Square is named after the General Post Office (GPO) which was situated on Customhouse Quay beside the square from 1888 until its demolition in 1974. As of 2026 the site of the former building is used by Hotel InterContinental. In 1905 Wellington's Queen Victoria Monument was placed in the square following her Diamond Jubilee in 1897. The statue was moved in 1911 to land that separates Kent and Cambridge Terraces. In 1911 a part of Post Office Square was replaced with a road in an attempt to optimise traffic flow.

For some time Post Office Square was considered the centre of Wellington. When the General Post Office clock tower was extant, people would gather at the square on New Year's Eve to listen to the tower's bells chime at midnight. By the 1960s the tower had been removed from the building. Post Office Square was also used for several mass meetings and protests. This included the 1913 Great Strike, as the square was located beside the offices of the watersiders' and seamen's unions. On 30 October there was a fight between strikers and horse-mounted special constables on the square and the nearby Hunter Street. The square was also used in the 1951 New Zealand waterfront dispute.

The last post office in the area closed in about the 2000s. Despite this, the name Post Office Square has remained. This discrepancy has led some tourists to enter the area with the expectation of finding a non-existent post office.

== Red telephone box ==
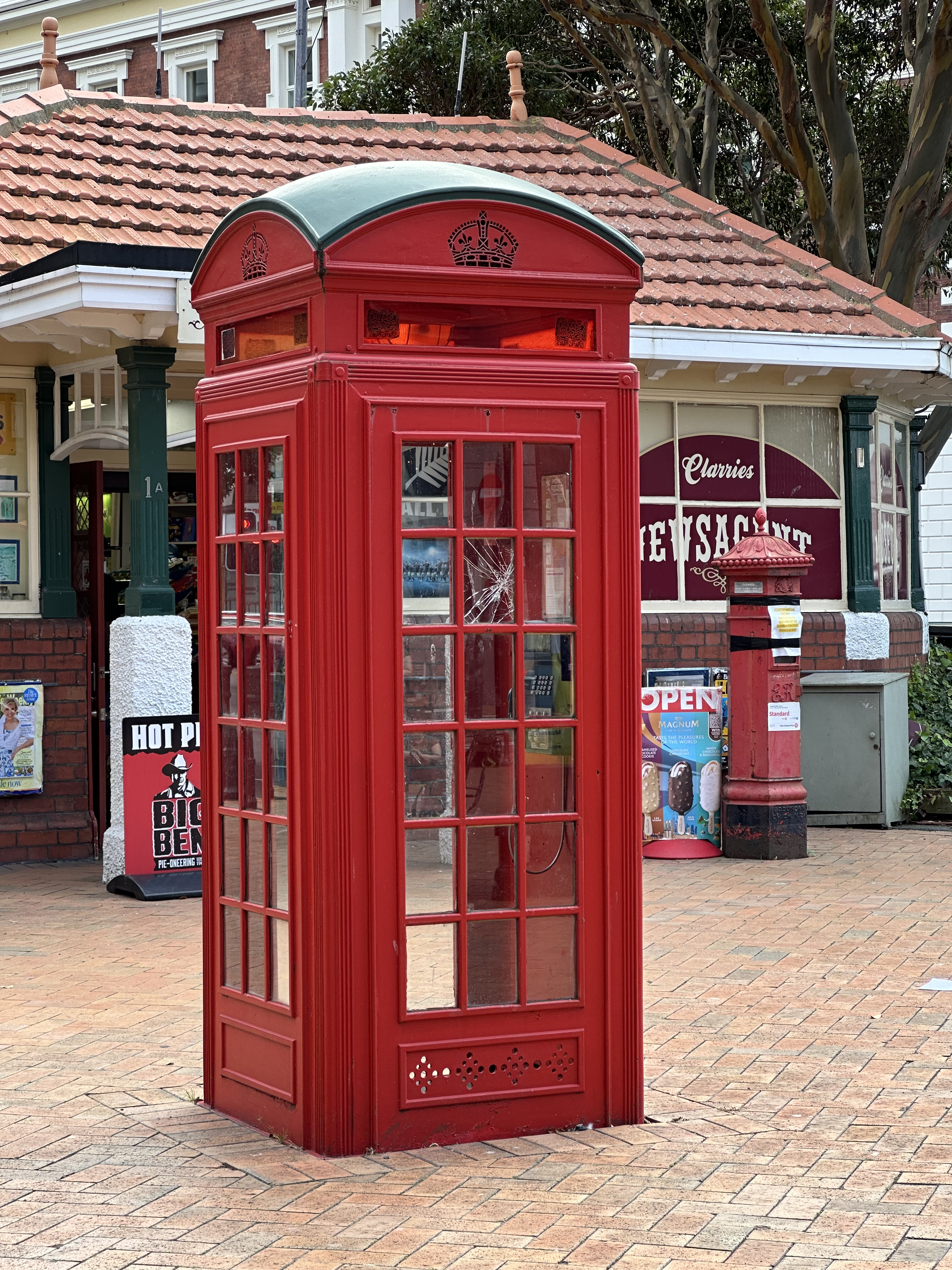
The red telephone box

Post Office Square contains a K2 red telephone box listed by Heritage New Zealand as a Category II historic place. It is one of about 50 red telephone boxes in New Zealand, with over half of them being replicas. Originally located on Karori Road, the telephone box was moved to the square in 1991 and was restored. The telephone box has most elements from its original K2 design, but no longer has a K2 design door or the glass "telephone" signs near the top of the structure. As of 2013 the telephone box was used to make an average of 2.5 phone calls per day.

== Clarrie Gibbons Building ==
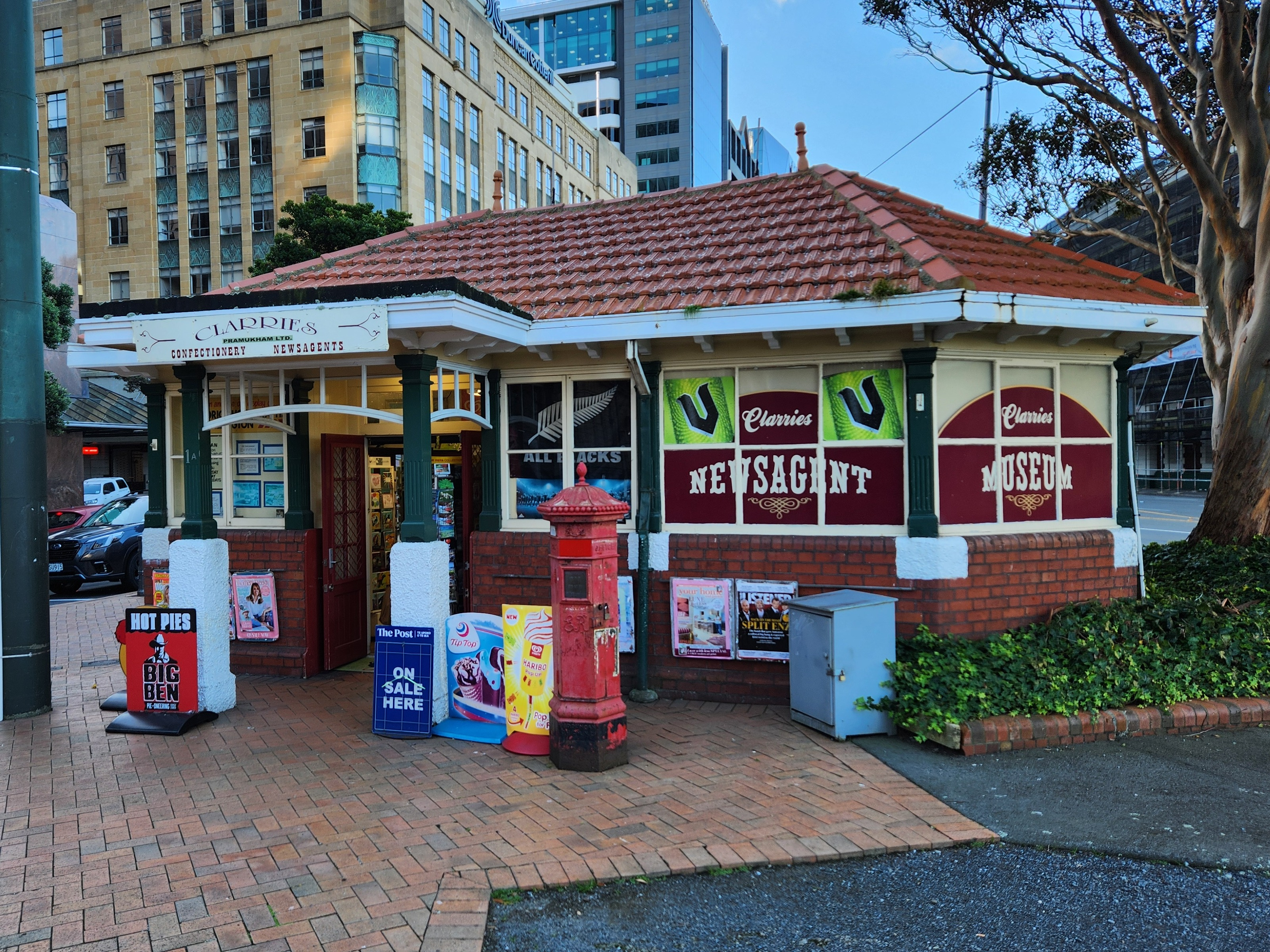
The Clarrie Gibbons Building in May 2026

The Clarrie Gibbons Building is located in the square. It was built in 1912 at a cost of £419 for Wellington's tramway system. It functioned as a tram stop, a women's bathroom and a freight depot. It was converted in 1945 to a tobacco shop and a newsagent's shop. In 1965 the business was taken over by Clarrie Gibbons, after whom the building is named. His son Murray began working in the building in the 1970s. He sold the company to Babu and Kamla Ranchhod in 2003. As of 2012 the building functioned as a dairy, museum and information centre.

== SkyBlues sculpture ==
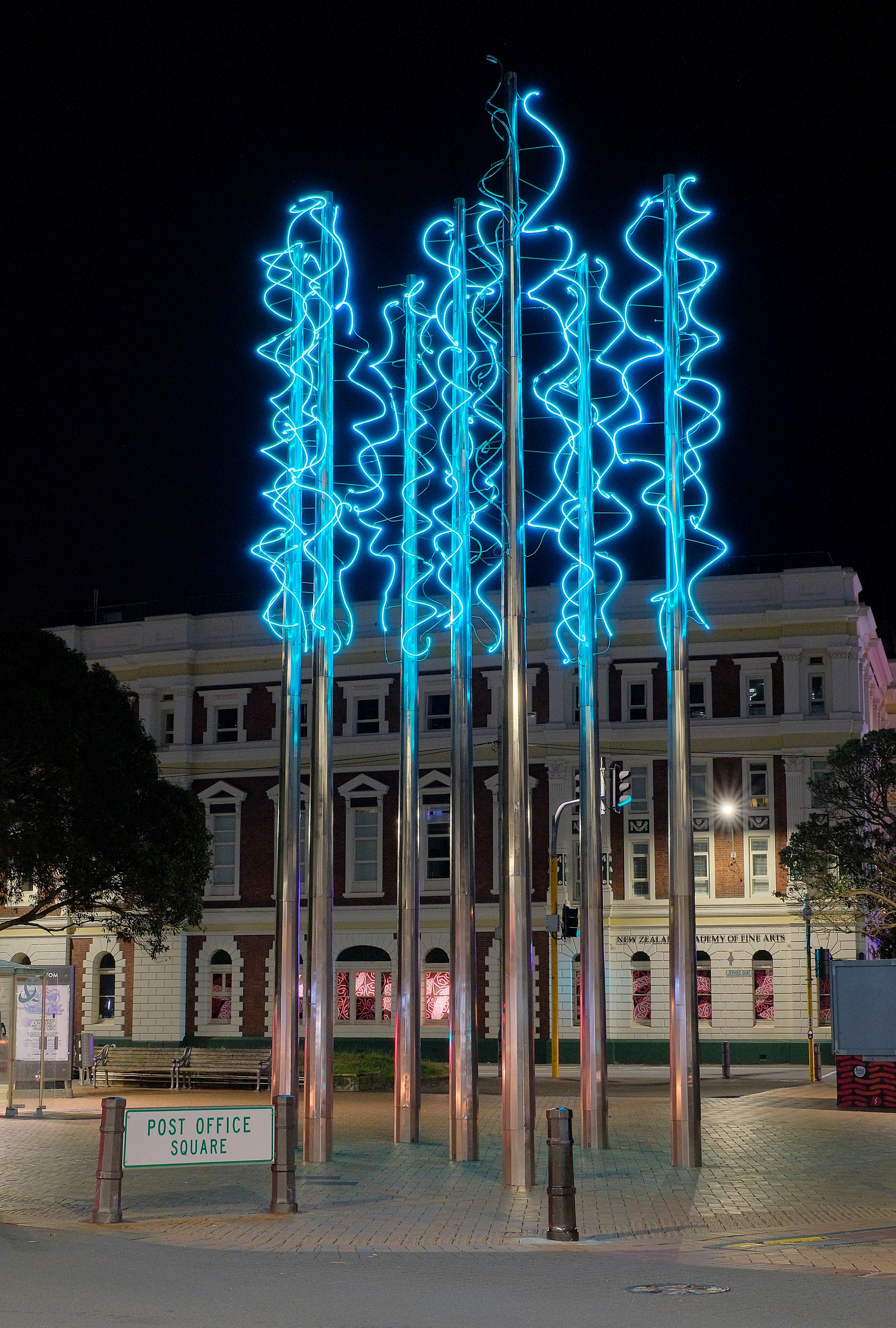
The SkyBlues sculpture at night in 2024

The SkyBlues sculpture by Bill Culbert was installed in Post Office Square in 2006. It consists of seven stainless steel poles that are almost 11 metres (36 ft) tall, in a spiral arrangement. The top 5 metres (16 ft) of each pole is surrounded by three by twisting blue lights.

== France Telecom phone booth ==
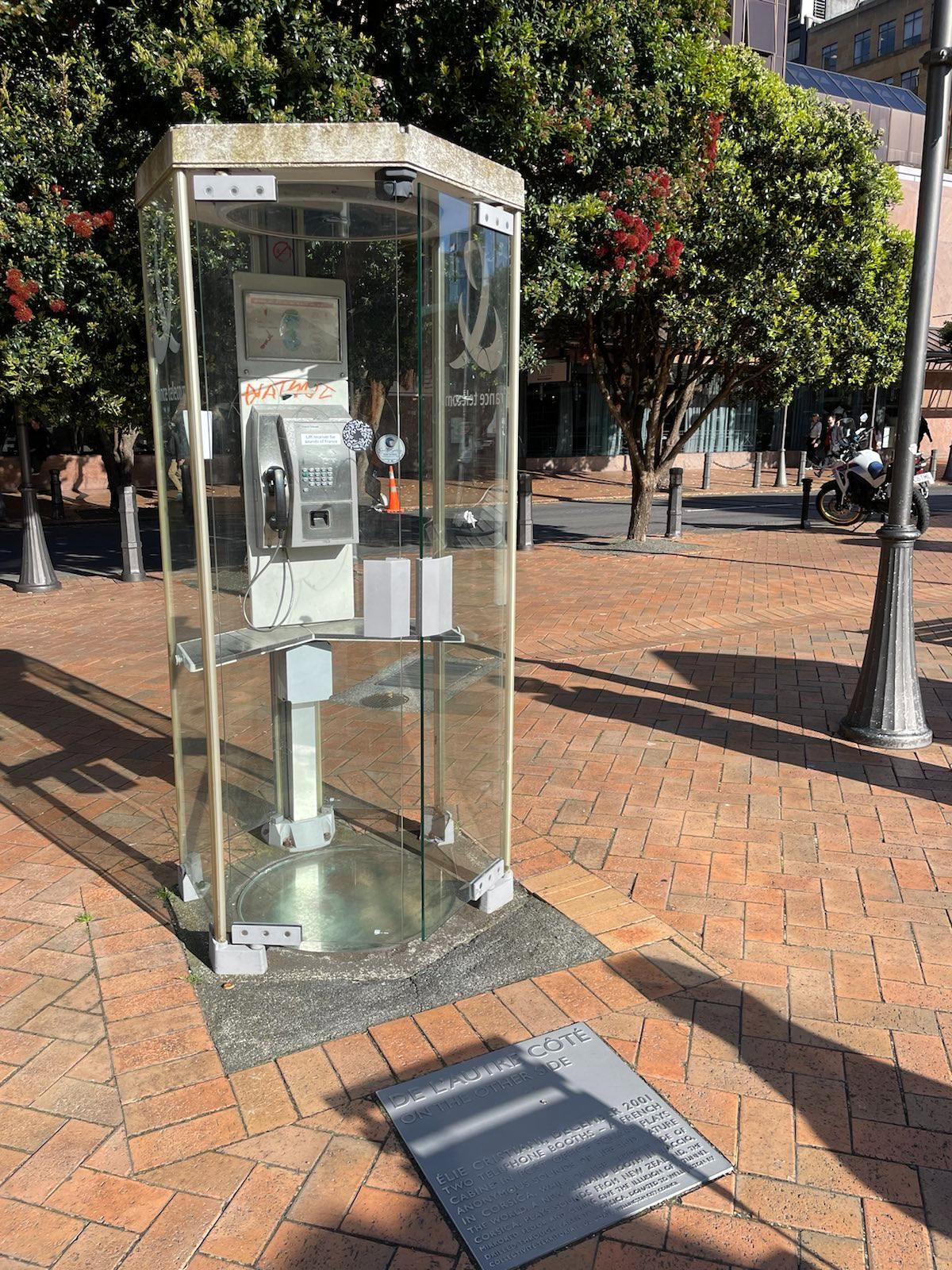
The France Telecom phone booth in 2008

Post Office Square has a France Telecom phone booth, made of clear glass. It is not a real telephone booth, but rather an art piece made by Elie Christiani, from the French island of Corsica. The phone booth plays sounds from Corsica, including music and playing children. Mirrors in the booth's floor and ceiling give the appearance that it is connected by tunnel to Corsica, which is almost Wellington's antipode. There is also a New Zealand phone booth in Corsica, which plays sounds from New Zealand. The phone booths were activated in late 2001, after a being inactive for a few months due to concerns by New Zealand authorities that some Corsican sounds were too inappropriate. The France Telecom phone booth was initially expected to be operational for a few months.
