= Statue of Queen Victoria, Christchurch =

Statue in Christchurch, New Zealand

Queen Victoria Statue
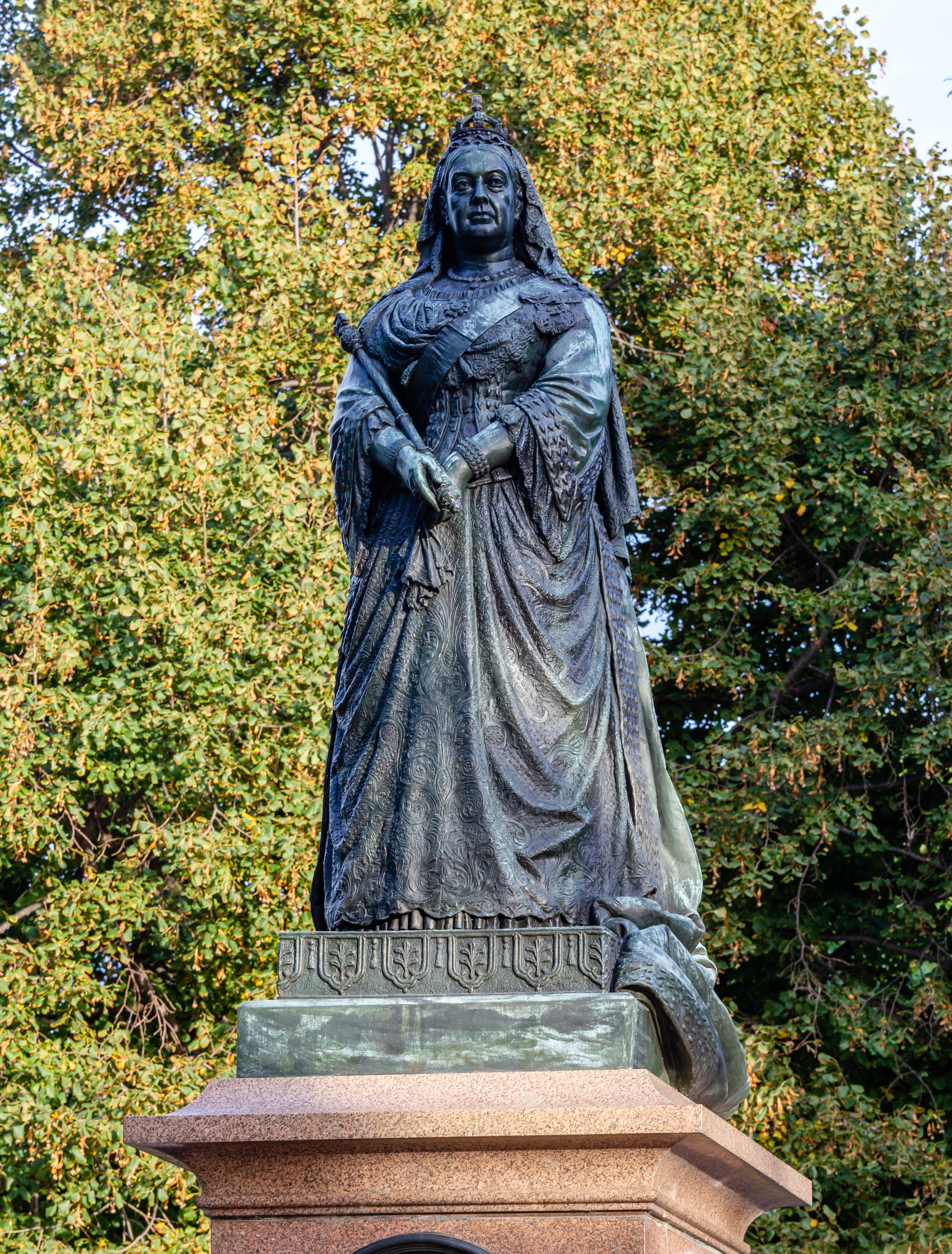
- The Queen Victoria Statue in 2020
- Interactive map of Queen Victoria Statue
- Location: Christchurch Central City, Victoria Square, New Zealand
- Coordinates: 43.5284529°S 172.6361740°E
- Designer: Francis John Williamson
- Material: Marble
- Completion date: 1900
- Opening date: 23 May 1903, 7 April 1904

Heritage New Zealand – Category 2
- Designated: 11 November 1981
- Reference no.: 1916

The statue of Queen Victoria is a large bronze statue of Queen Victoria in Victoria Square, Christchurch. It was sculpted by British artist Francis John Williamson and erected in 1903.

As well as being a monument to the queen, plaques on the statue commemorate the settlement of the Canterbury Province and local soldiers that fought in the South African wars.

== Description ==
The statue depicts Queen Victoria wearing coronial robes and carrying a sceptre. Around the base of the statue are six bronze relief panels dedicated to the early European settlers of Canterbury and the industries of the area. There are also two plaques memorialising the New Zealand soldiers who fought in the Second Boer War, and a plaque with Victoria's name and dates. The plinth on which the statue stands is granite.

== History ==
=== Background ===
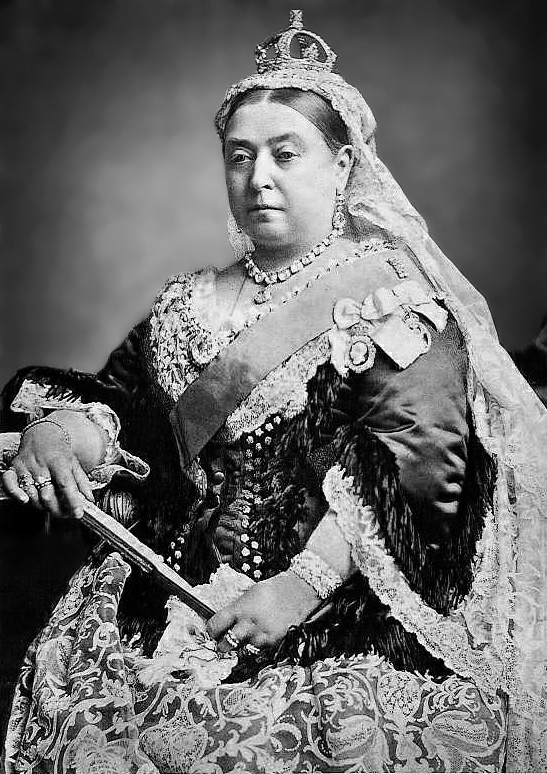
A portrait of Queen Victoria by Alexander Bassano (1882)

Queen Victoria was the monarch of the United Kingdom and the broader British Empire from 1837 to 1901. Celebrations and increased popularity following her Golden and Diamond Jubilees initiated a wave of public monuments to her across the Empire in the late 1800s, corresponding with a general international trend of nationalist sculpture and monument construction in the period.

One of the four squares in Christchurch Central City became its original centre of commerce and it was thus known as Market Place. One of the original diagonal roads, then known as Whately Road, bisected Market Place. When the era of provincial government ended and the administration of Christchurch was transferred to Christchurch City Council, street numbering was introduced. This opportunity for change was used to rename Whately Road and it became Victoria Street after the colony's monarch.

=== Early plans ===
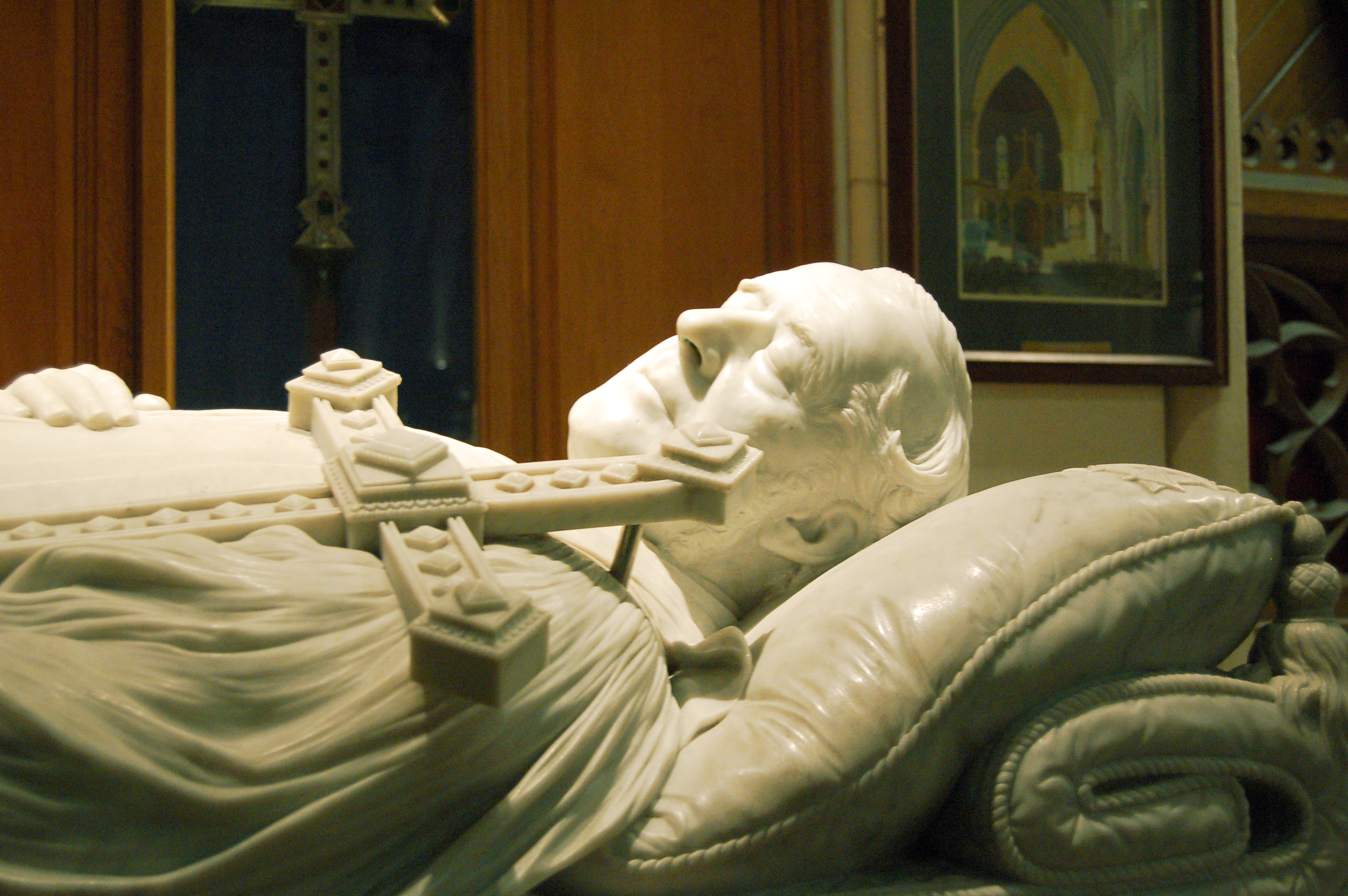
Henry Harper's memorial in ChristChurch Cathedral, sculpted by Francis John Williamson

James Irving, a physician and surgeon whose property fronted onto Market Place, first proposed in 1894 that the area be renamed to Victoria Square as it was no longer used as a market. Irving repeated his proposal and others agreed, but nothing came of it during his lifetime; he died in October 1900. Patriotism was heightened during the Second Boer War, but it was the 50th jubilee of Christchurch that resulted in the Market Place to be renamed to Victoria Square as first suggested by Irving. A committee chaired by Henry Wigram was tasked with compiling proposals for the jubilee and to decide on them. The committee received 113 proposals for a permanent jubilee memorial. The most extensively debated proposal was to finish Christ Church Cathedral but in the end, it was felt that this needs to progressed by the Anglican community. The second-highest vote of the committee was for a statue of Queen Victoria. The compromise proposal of the mayor, William Reece, was to erect an obelisk to commemorate a combination of the queen, the Canterbury pioneers, and local soldiers who had died in the Boer War. The committee had, by the end of August 1900, agreed on a statue of Queen Victoria, with plaques commemorating fallen troopers and the Canterbury Pilgrims. Francis John Williamson was engaged as the sculptor, as he had produced a replica of his 1887 Queen Victoria statue for 1899 Auckland statue and the effigy for Bishop Harper's tomb. Mayor Reece preferred a seated queen, but Williamson pointed to that being far more expensive than a standing figure.

There were other events to be organised for late 1900 by the jubilee committee. First, there was an industrial exhibition that was to coincide with the Canterbury A&P Show in early November. The other event was a civic procession in mid-December to celebrate the arrival of the Charlotte Jane and the Randolph, the first of the First Four Ships to have arrived. With those events out of the way, the committee decided in early January 1901 to order a standing statue and a granite pedestal, with bronze bas-reliefs to be fitted later as funds allowed. Queen Victoria died 12 days after that decision had been made, and Wigram implored the committee to proceed with urgency, as he expected there to be a high demand for statues from throughout the Commonwealth. Christchurch's leading newspaper, The Press, had previously favoured the cathedral completion project but was now supporting the statue.

The city council considered three sites for the statue:

- Market Place
- A council yard on the corner of Worcester Street and Oxford Terrace opposite the council chamber (Note: This site was used in 1917 for the statue of Robert Falcon Scott.)
- Latimer Square

James Bickerton Fisher, a member of the memorial committee, suggested that the statue be placed in the south-west corner of the Market Place; this was eventually agreed to. Fisher also made the connection between Victoria Street, the Victoria statue, and Victoria Square all being co-located if the statue would be placed here. By the end of March 1901, the city council decided to erect the statue in Market Place and change the square's name to Victoria Square with the unveiling of the statue. Soon after, council workers started to deposit soil and rubble in that corner of the square as to raise its elevation, giving the statue a more prominent placement.

=== Installation and unveiling ===
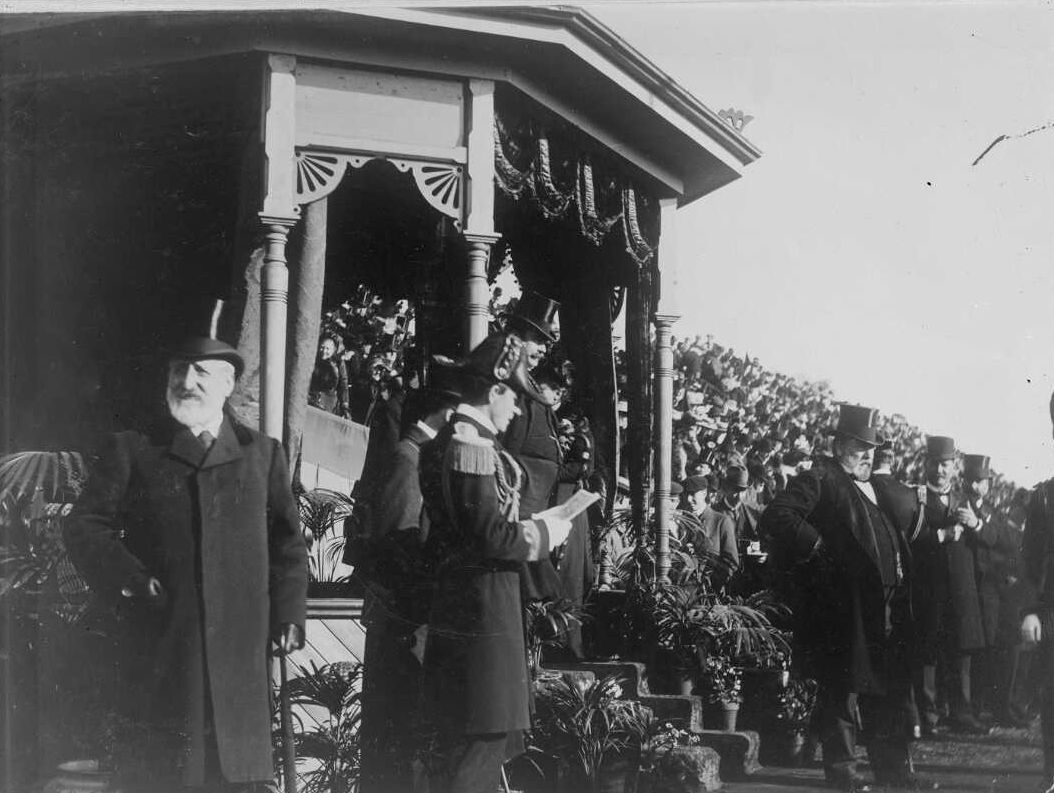
Prince George, Duke of Cornwall and York, giving a speech as part of laying the foundation stone on 22 June 1901

In 1901, Albert Edward, Prince of Wales and his wife Alexandra were planning an Empire tour. However, Queen Victoria's death meant that the couple had to prepare for a coronation in 1902. Edward's son Prince George, Duke of Cornwall and York, and his wife, Princess Mary, were assigned to undertake the voyage instead. Central government paid for a wooden grandstand to be built in Armagh Street for old age pensioners and local dignitaries. A dais with a canopy had been erected in case of inclement weather. Dignitaries present were the mayor (Arthur Rhodes), the premier (Richard Seddon), and Henry Wigram (as chair of the commissioners). Speakers were the mayor and the Duke, who responded to the mayor:

Mr Mayor, ladies and gentlemen, we are happy to be here, and to be associated in this tribute of affection to our late dearly beloved Queen. I should say to you, teach your children to look up to it as a memorial of her, whose life was a noble example of devotion to duty, of tender sympathy with, and loving regard for, the wellbeing of her people, to us all a priceless heritage. And I can assure you that both the Duchess and I are greatly touched by the very kind and hearty welcome which has been given to-day by the people of Christchurch.

For the bas-reliefs, local artists were invited to provide designs. Charles Kidson's designs were forwarded to Williamson, who improved on them. As Wigram had expected, high demand for similar statues had created a logjam at the Burton foundry, but the benefit was that the list of dead troopers could be further considered. Instead of just listing dead troopers who were members of the third contingent, (Note: Ten contingents were sent to South Africa from New Zealand. The third contingent was organised by the mayor of Christchurch and made up of two companies, one from Canterbury and one from the Hawke's Bay.) it was decided that all troopers who were born in Canterbury would be listed.

The statue arrived in New Zealand in January 1903, with only one of the six bronze plaques included, but it was unveiled nonetheless on 25 May 1903. Another unveiling ceremony took place on 7 April 1904 once the remaining plaques had been completed. This ceremony was led by Lord Ranfurly, Governor of New Zealand.

=== Recent history ===
The statue was moved to the present location in 1989, as part of the general redesign of the square. The statue did not sustain any significant damage in the 2011 Christchurch earthquake.

== Gallery ==
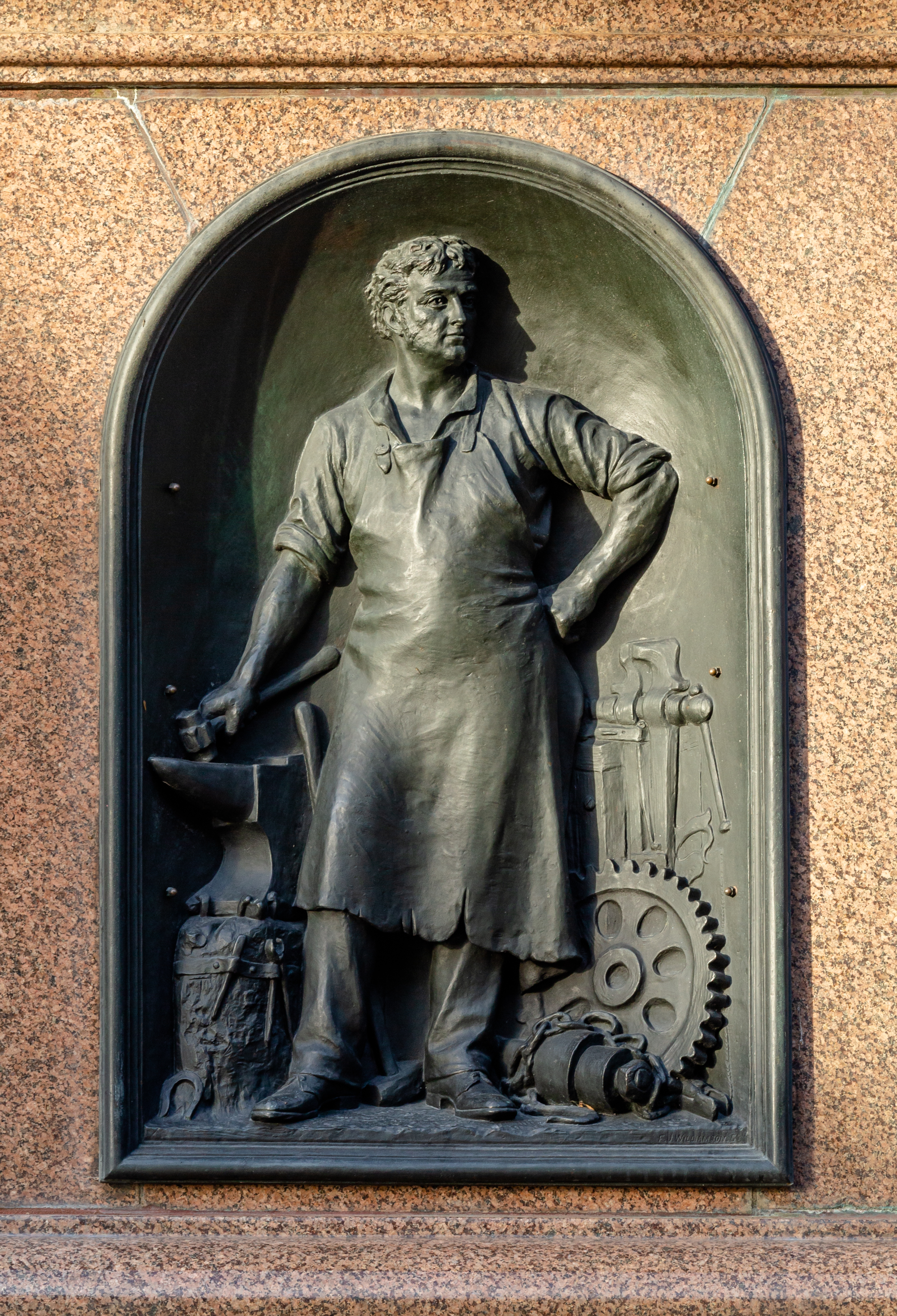
One of the four bronze reliefs depicting local industry.

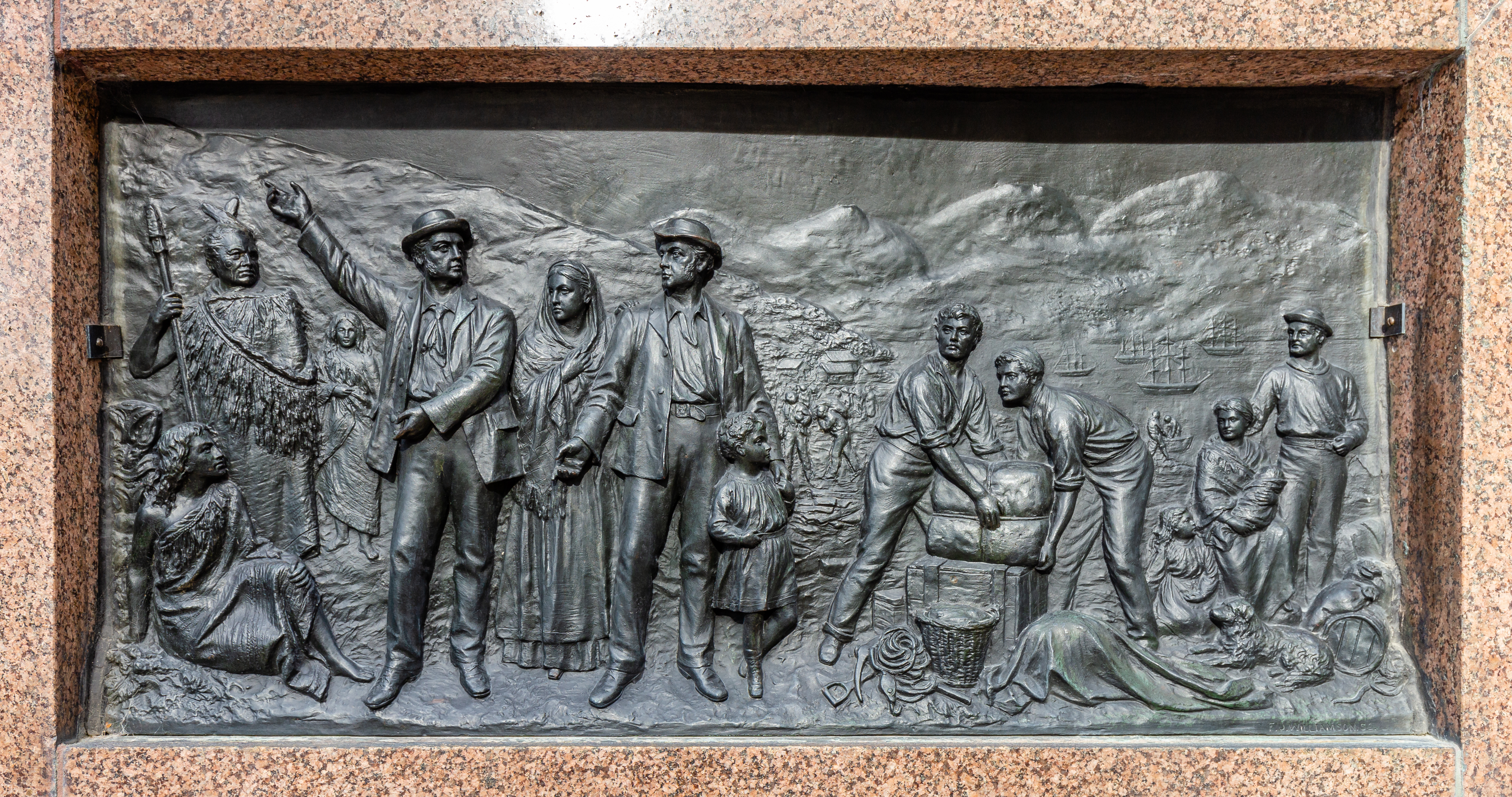
One of the two larger reliefs, depicting early settlers arriving in Lyttelton, New Zealand.

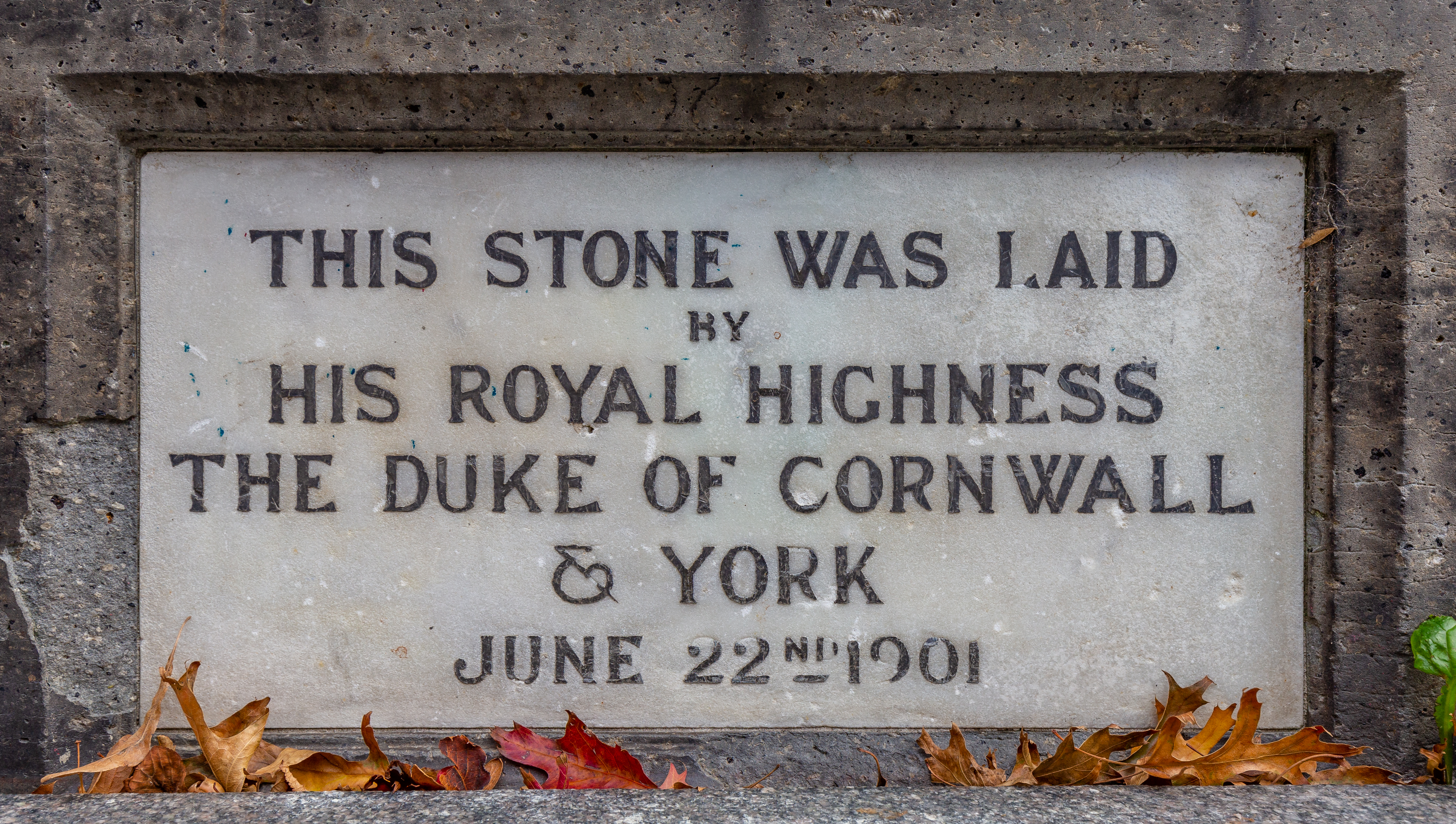
The foundation stone, ceremonially laid by the Duke of Cornwall & York (later George V).

== See also ==
- List of historic places in Christchurch
