= Statue of Queen Victoria, Auckland =

Bronze statue in Auckland, New Zealand

Queen Victoria Statue
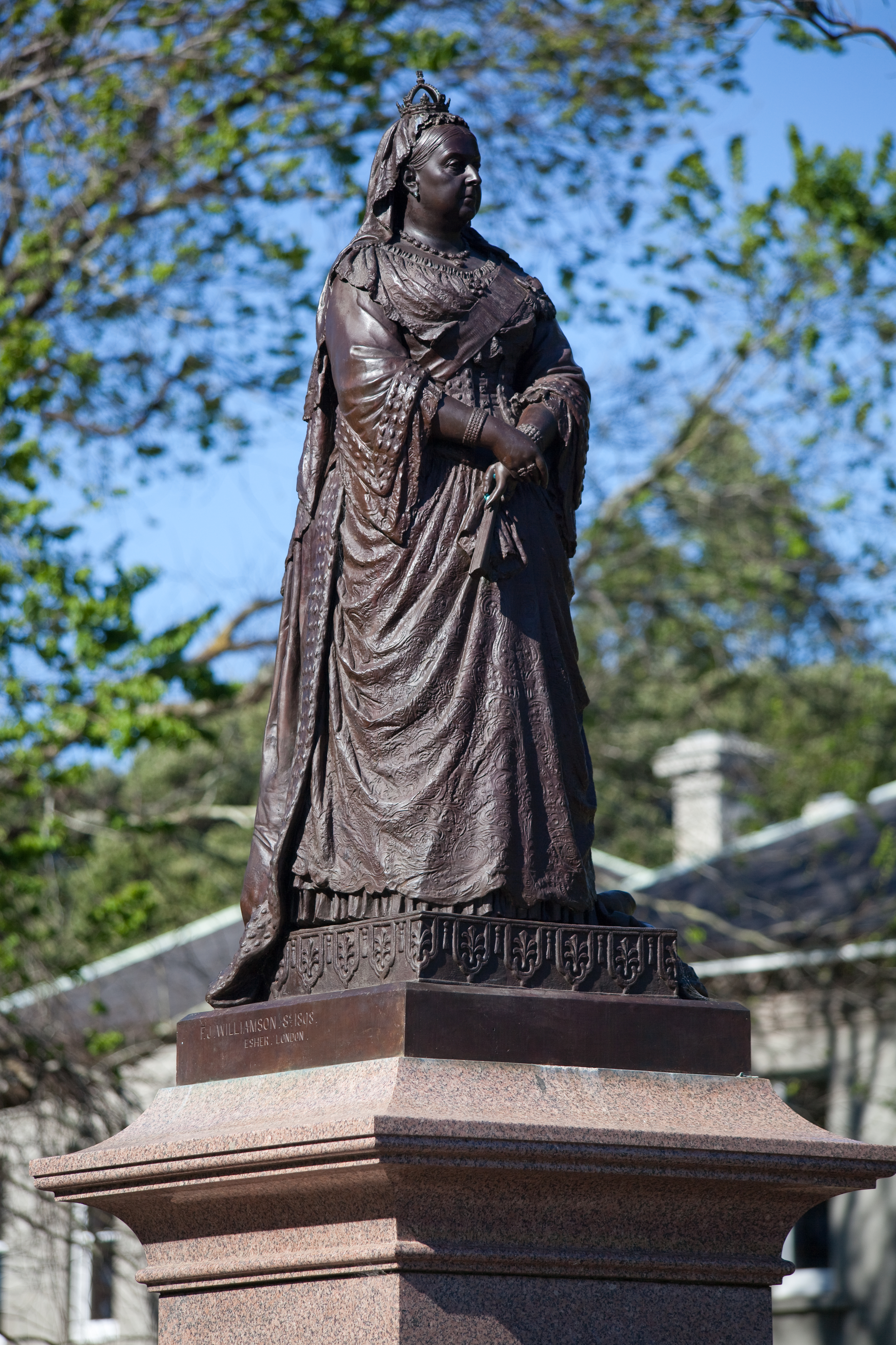
- The Queen Victoria Statue in 2009
- Interactive map of Queen Victoria Statue
- Location: Albert Park, Auckland, New Zealand
- Coordinates: 36°51′0.9″S 174°46′5.1″E
- Designer: Francis John Williamson
- Material: Bronze (statue); Granite (base)
- Height: 180 cm (71 in) (statue); 450 cm (180 in) (including pedestal)
- Opening date: 1899

Heritage New Zealand – Category 2
- Designated: 11 November 1981
- Reference no.: 633

A statue of Queen Victoria was erected at Albert Park, Auckland, in 1899. The second monument to Queen Victoria in New Zealand, the bronze statue was funded by public donations encouraged by Auckland politicians and the New Zealand Herald in celebration of the Queen's Diamond Jubilee. Following applications from various British and New Zealand artists, the statue was commissioned to British portrait sculptor Francis John Williamson. It was one of nine variants of his 1887 statue erected at the Royal College of Surgeons, allegedly a favourite of the future Edward VII.

The statue is approximately 4.5 m (15 ft) tall including the granite pedestal, small compared to other statues of Victoria in New Zealand. Erected on the former location of the Albert Barracks, the statue was a central point for various imperial and patriotic observances, such as Empire Day, which gradually declined over the twentieth century. Later in the century, it became a frequent site for protests due to cultural associations with imperialism and colonialism.

== Background ==
Queen Victoria was the monarch of the United Kingdom and the broader British Empire from 1837 to 1901. The earliest monument to Queen Victoria in New Zealand was a relatively obscure wooden bust of the queen erected in 1874 at the Māori village of Ohinemutu. Celebrations and increased popularity following her Golden Jubilee initiated a wave of public monuments to her across the Empire in the late 1800s, corresponding with a general international trend of nationalist sculpture and monument construction in the period. The statue was the first of four statues depicting Queen Victoria that were commissioned for the major cities in New Zealand, and was the only one that was unveiled during her lifetime.

=== Creation ===
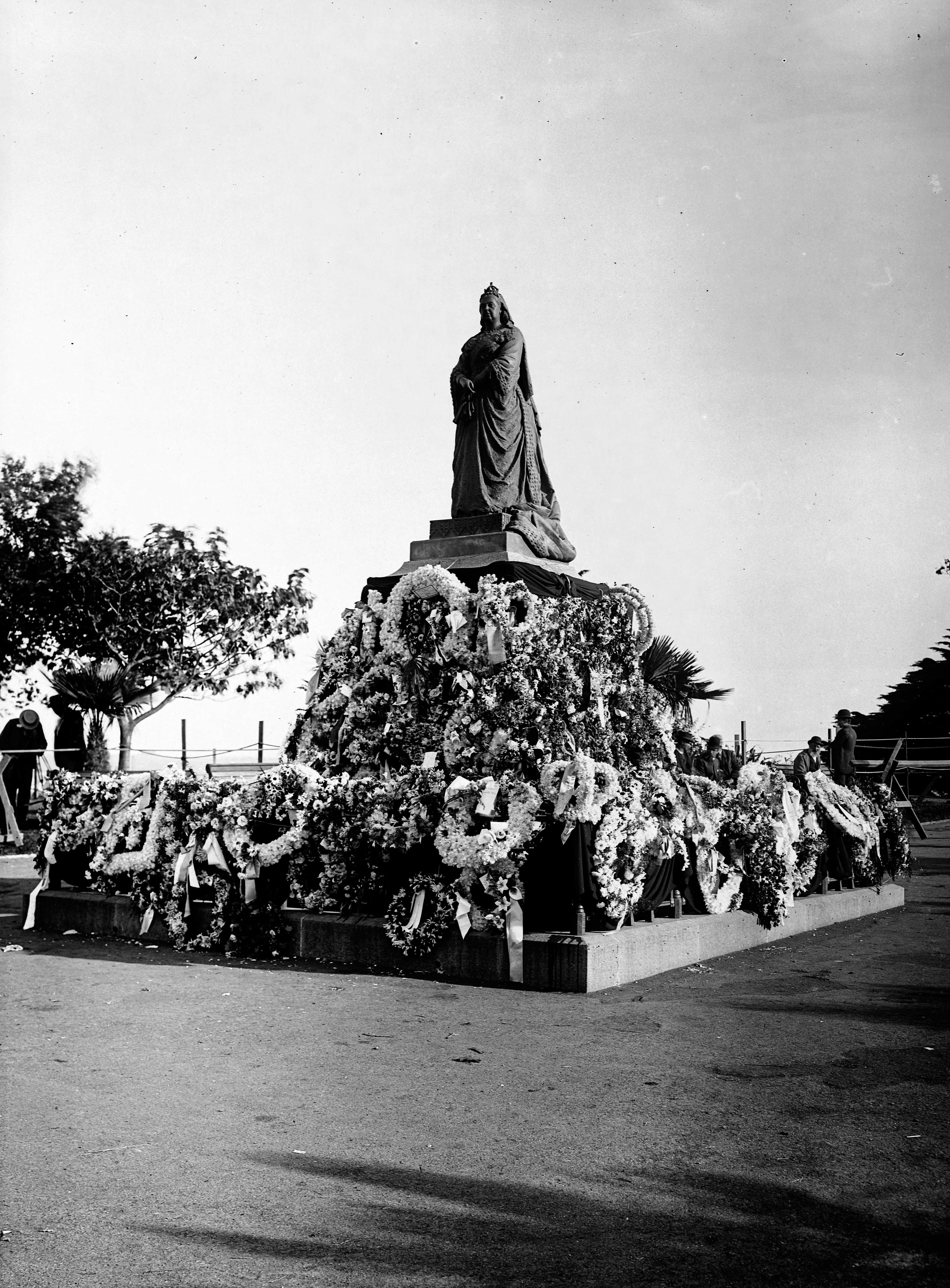
The statue covered with mourning wreaths following Victoria's death in early 1901.

Public meetings considering the creation of a local monument to the Queen Victoria were held by the Auckland City Council in May 1897, prior to her Diamond Jubilee. Former Auckland City mayor John Upton was elected to chair early proceedings. Memorials considered included a children's hospital, nursing home, and institute for the blind. The City Council initially supported the construction of a memorial children's hospital, but this was heavily opposed by the New Zealand Herald, which proposed a statue to be constructed at Albert Park, the former location of the Albert Barracks, which had been demolished several decades prior to make way for Albert Park. The Herald proposed that the monument would distinguish the city from others in the colony and instil respect in future generations. A reader poll was held by the paper, with the largest share of roughly 2000 respondents voting in favour of the statue as opposed to other proposed memorials. A later public hearing supported the poll's findings.

Donation boxes for the statue's construction were placed around Auckland for the Diamond Jubilee on 22 June 1897, raising over £150 within two days. Due to heavy public involvement and contribution, the monument was nicknamed the "People's Statue". Applications came from various notable British sculptors to design the statue, as well as the New Zealander William Leslie Morison. Hamo Thornycroft and Francis John Williamson emerged as finalists by early 1898. Although Thornycroft was considered to have greater artistic prestige, the committee was unable to afford his commission. Photographs of Williamson's 1887 Victoria statue built for the Royal College of Surgeons impressed the memorial committee, especially due to Edward, Prince of Wales' alleged praise for the sculpture as the "best portrait ever executed of his mother." The statue at Auckland was to be the second of nine variants of Williamson's statue, following a copy at Derry completed in 1898. A significantly larger variation of the same design would be later erected in 1903 in Christchurch.

With the statue officially commissioned in February 1898, it reached Auckland in January 1899. It was officially unveiled on Victoria's eightieth birthday, 24 May 1899. The statue's opening ceremony included speeches by members of the Waikato Māori and Governor Uchter Knox, as well as a gun salute by warships anchored in Freemans Bay.

== History ==
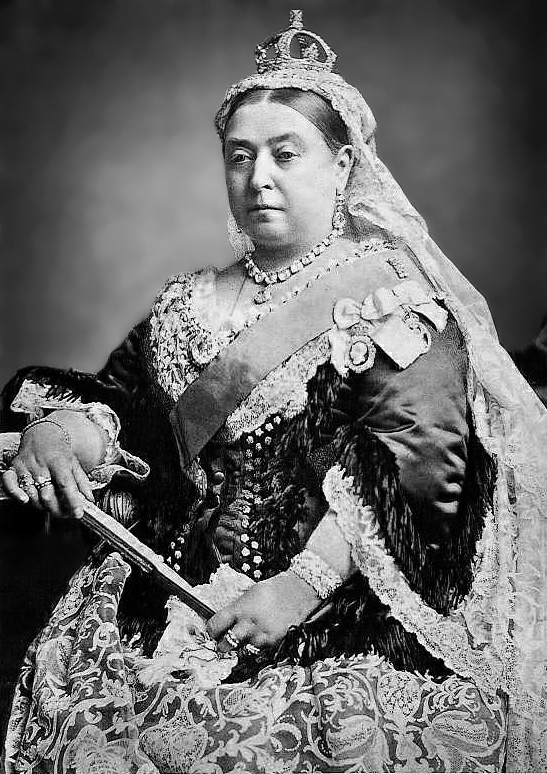
Victoria's Golden Jubilee portrait served as a base for Williamson's statues of the monarch.

A local procession laid wreaths at the statue following Victoria's death in early 1901. The statue was the focus of various patriotic and imperial commemorations. Empire Day celebrations, presided over by the Governor of New Zealand, were held at the statue for much of the early twentieth century, but gradually declined following the end of the Second World War. Beginning under Edward VII's reign, the statue was frequently visited by parades celebrating the King's Birthday. The statue was also the site of annual reunions of Waikato War veterans of the 18th Royal Irish Regiment.

During the late 20th century, the statue was frequently targeted by protests due to associations with monarchy and colonialism. In 1971, a mock funeral was held by a University of Auckland feminist student group to commemorate the 78th anniversary of women's suffrage, choosing the location due to Victoria's staunch opposition to female voting rights. Ngāhuia Te Awekotuku and members of the Gay Liberation Front held pride events at the statue in 1972, reported as the first public acts of the New Zealand gay rights movement.

The statue was listed on the Heritage New Zealand list of historic sites as a Category 2 place (reflecting places of "historical or cultural heritage significance or value") in 1981.

== Composition ==
The monument features a roughly life-size Victoria styled after her Golden Jubilee portrait taken by Alexander Bassano, as well as on in-person sittings taken by Williamson. Measuring 180 cm (71 in) in height (including the crown and bronze base), the statue sits atop a 270 cm (110 in) granite pedestal, on which a dedication for the statue is engraved. Due to conservative artistic aims by its sculptor and relatively modest contributions from citizens, the Albert Park sculpture is very small in scale compared to succeeding statues of Victoria built after her death, as well as to contemporary monuments to Victoria found in Britain. The statue depicts Victoria as "elderly but dignified"; holding a fan and handkerchief, and features extensive detail on Victoria's crown and dress, where even the dress' pattern can be seen. A wrought-iron fence, originally surrounding the statue, was later removed.

== Reception ==
Art historian Michael Dunn felt that Williamson's attention to detail in the work, such as featuring the pattern of Victoria's dress "contributes to her characterisation as a woman as well as a monarch and helps to humanise her image".

== See also ==
- List of statues of Queen Victoria
- Queen Victoria Monument, Wellington
